= Vermont Route 117 =

State highway in Chittenden County, Vermont, US

Vermont Route 117
- Map of Chittenden County in western Vermont with VT 117 highlighted in red

Route information
- Maintained by VTrans
- Length: 8.072 mi (12.991 km)

Major junctions
- West end: VT 2A / VT 15 in Essex Junction
- VT 289 in Essex
- East end: US 2 in Richmond

Location
- Country: United States
- State: Vermont
- Counties: Chittenden

Highway system
- State highways in Vermont
← VT 116A	→ VT 118

Vermont Route 117 (VT 117) is a state highway in the U.S. state of Vermont. The highway runs 8.072 miles (12.991 km) from VT 2A and VT 15 in Essex Junction east to U.S. Route 2 (US 2) in Richmond. VT 117 connects the city of Essex Junction with Jericho in central Chittenden County. The highway also connects the eastern end of VT 289 with Interstate 89 (I-89).

== Route description ==
VT 117 begins at a five-way intersection in the city of Essex Junction north of the eponymous railroad wye and south of the eponymous Amtrak station. VT 2A heads north and south from the junction along Lincoln Street and Park Street, respectively, and VT 15 heads west and northeast from the junction along Pearl Street and Main Street, respectively. VT 117 heads east through the Downtown Essex Junction Commercial Historic District along two-lane Maple Street, which has a grade crossing of the New England Central Railroad line that carries Amtrak. After leaving the village, the highway's name changes to River Road, it begins to parallel the Winooski River, and meets the eastern end of VT 289 (Chittenden County Circumferential Highway) at a pair of widely spaced ramps just west of Alder Brook. VT 117 follows the river southeast through the town of Jericho, where the route passes the Martin Chittenden House before crossing Mill Brook. As soon as the highway enters the town of Richmond, it closely parallels the railroad south to its eastern terminus at US 2 (Main Street) just west of the U.S. Highway's interchange with I-89.

The city of Essex Junction maintains VT 117 within the limits of Essex Junction. The Vermont Agency of Transportation maintains the remainder of the highway through Essex, Jericho, and Richmond.

== Major intersections ==
The entire route is in Chittenden County.

Location	mi	km	Destinations	Notes
Essex Junction	0.000	0.000	VT 2A (Lincoln Street/Park Street) / VT 15 (Pearl Street/Main Street) – Williston, Winooski, Colchester, Jericho	Western terminus
Essex	2.097– 2.381	3.375– 3.832	VT 289 west (Chittenden County Circumferential Highway)	VT 289 exit 12; current eastern terminus of VT 289
Richmond	8.072	12.991	US 2 (Main Street) to I-89 – Richmond, Bolton, Williston, Burlington	Eastern terminus
1.000 mi = 1.609 km; 1.000 km = 0.621 mi
