= U.S. Route 2 in Vermont =

Section of Numbered Highway in Vermont, United States

U.S. Route 2
- Theodore Roosevelt Highway
- US 2 highlighted in red, VT 2A highlighted in blue, and VT 2B highlighted in purple

Route information
- Maintained by NYSDOT and VTrans
- Length: 150.518 mi (242.235 km) US 2 continues west into New York for 0.87 mi (1.40 km)
- Existed: 1926–present

Major junctions
- West end: US 11 in Rouses Point, NY
- I-89 in Colchester; US 7 from Colchester to Burlington; VT 100 in Waterbury; VT 12 in Montpelier; US 302 in Montpelier; I-91 / US 5 in St. Johnsbury
- East end: US 2 at the New Hampshire state line near Guildhall

Location
- Country: United States
- State: Vermont
- Counties: Grand Isle, Chittenden, Washington, Caledonia, Essex

Highway system
- United States Numbered Highway System; List; Special; Divided; State highways in Vermont
- New York Highways; Interstate; US; State; Reference; Parkways
← VT F-10A	→ VT 3
← VT 116	VT 116A	→ VT 117
← VT 346	VT F-1	→ VT F-2
← NY 1X	NY	→ NY 2

U.S. Route 2 (US 2) is a part of the United States Numbered Highway System that is split into two segments. Its eastern segment runs from Rouses Point, New York, to Houlton, Maine. In Vermont, US 2 extends 150.518 miles (242.235 km) from the New York state line in Alburgh to the New Hampshire state line in Guildhall. West of Vermont, US 2 continues into New York for another 0.87 miles (1.40 km) to an intersection with US 11 in Rouses Point. US 2 passes through the cities of Burlington and Montpelier as it traverses the state. The highway parallels Interstate 89 (I-89) between these two cities. The Burlington to Montpelier route was first laid out as a toll road in the early 19th century. It was later incorporated into the transcontinental auto trail known as the Theodore Roosevelt International Highway in 1919 before being designated as part of US 2 in 1926.

Although the portion of the road from Alburgh to Burlington follows a north–south alignment, US 2 is continuously signed east (heading south during this portion) and west (heading north) to match its overall alignment, making it the longest east–west signed route in the state.

== Route description ==
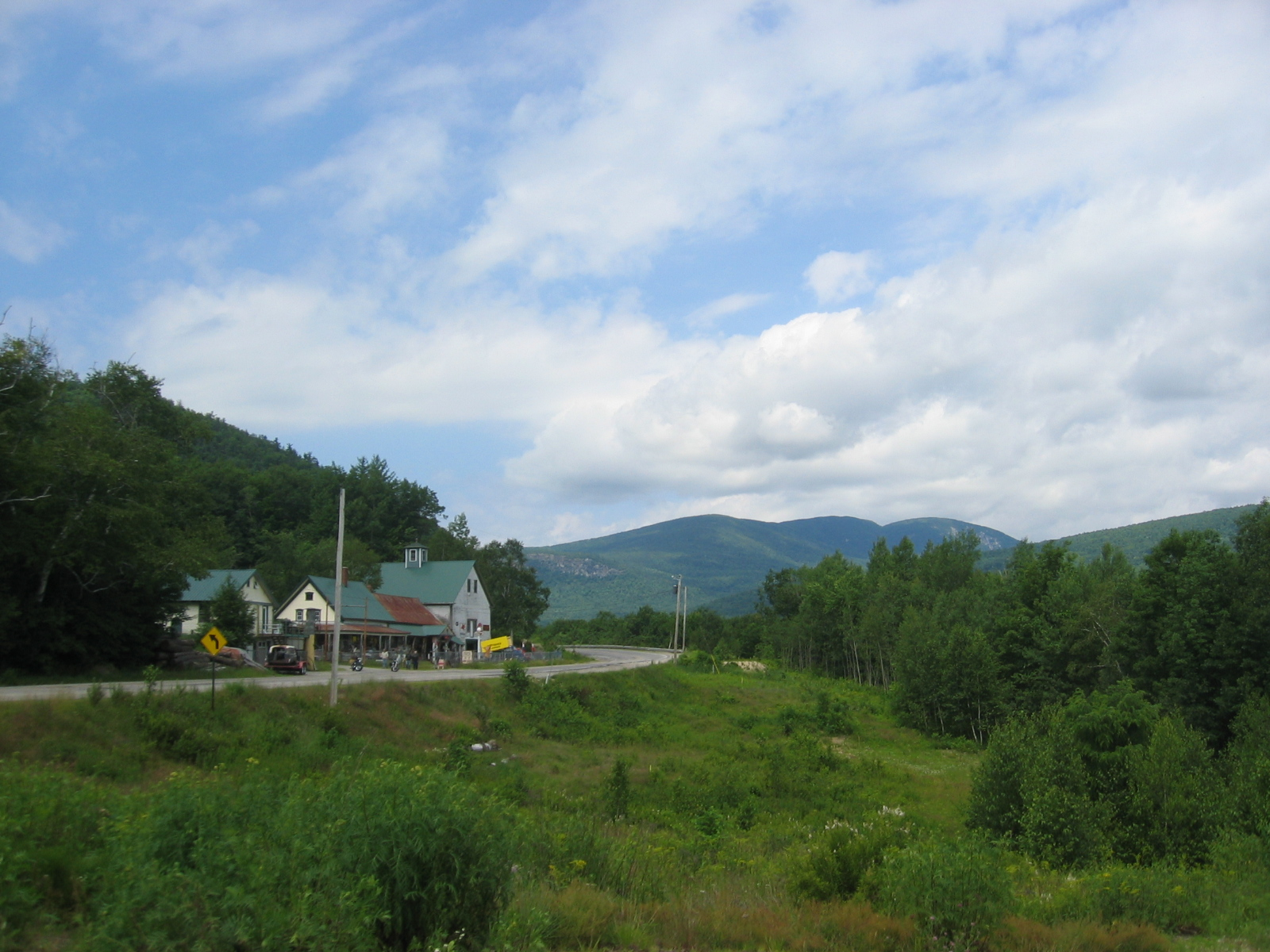
US 2 in Vermont

The eastern segment of US 2 begins in New York at an intersection with US 11 just one mile (1.6 km) south of the Canadian border in Rouses Point. From there, it crosses Lake Champlain into Grand Isle County, traversing the length of the county and crossing Lake Champlain over several bridges until it reaches the mainland in Milton and Chittenden County. From there, it travels south to Burlington, where it begins to closely parallel I-89 and the Winooski River all the way to Montpelier and Washington County. In Montpelier, the main route bypasses the downtown area using Memorial Drive, while a business loop using State Street serves downtown. After leaving Montpelier, the road turns northeastward, crossing into Caledonia County and passing through St. Johnsbury. It then passes into rural Essex County and eventually crosses the Connecticut River from Guildhall into Lancaster, New Hampshire.

== History ==
An improved road between the main settlements of Burlington and Montpelier was first established from old footpaths in 1805, when the 36-mile (58 km) Winooski Turnpike was chartered by the state of Vermont. The old turnpike road utilized the relatively flat banks of the Winooski River to connect the two major towns and opened to traffic several years after the company was chartered. The road ceased operating as a toll road several decades later in 1852, when the road became publicly owned. The route of the old Winooski Turnpike between Burlington and Montpelier was later incorporated into the old Theodore Roosevelt International Highway. This cross-country auto trail, named in honor of recently deceased ex-president and naturalist Theodore Roosevelt, was organized in February 1919 to connect Portland, Maine, with Portland, Oregon. Within Vermont, the auto trail used what is now US 2 from Vermont Route 129 (VT 129) south of Alburgh center to VT 18 east of downtown St. Johnsbury.

Before being designated as US 2, the current alignment was part of several interstate routes of the 1922 New England road marking system. From Danville eastward to the state line, the US 2 alignment was part of Route 15; it was part of Route 18 between Montpelier and Danville; it used Route 14 between Burlington and Montpelier; and it used Route 30 between Alburgh and Burlington. When the plans for the U.S. Highway System were first drawn up in 1925, US 2 began in Alburgh and was routed along the Roosevelt Highway from Alburgh to Montpelier. Both US 2 and the Roosevelt Highway connected Montpelier to St. Johnsbury; however, the Roosevelt Highway used a direct path along former Route 18 while US 2 was initially assigned to then-Route 25 (modern US 302) to Wells River, where it overlapped proposed US 5 north to St. Johnsbury. From St. Johnsbury, the Roosevelt Highway turned southeast toward Portland along modern VT 18 while US 2 continued east along former Route 15 to Bangor. No changes were made to US 2 in the final system plan approved on November 11, 1926. US 2 was relocated onto its modern alignment along the original Roosevelt Highway route between Montpelier and St. Johnsbury in the mid-1930s. The original alignment of US 2 became part of the newly designated US 302.

Initially, Rouses Point, New York, and Alburgh were connected by way of a ferry across the Richelieu River. The ferry ran from the center of Rouses Point to Vermont's Windmill Point, where it connected to VT F-1, an east–west route linking Windmill Point to Alburgh. When US 2 was assigned, it was overlaid on the preexisting VT F-1, following the route and the ferry to the New York state line, where US 2 initially ended. In 1937, a new tolled swing bridge across the Richelieu River opened, carrying an extended US 2 between US 11 in Rouses Point and Alburgh. The swing bridge was replaced with a toll-free permanent bridge on September 22, 1987.

== Major intersections ==
The short continuation of US 2 into New York is included below.

State	County	Location	mi	km	Destinations	Notes
New York	Clinton	Rouses Point	0.00	0.00	US 11 to NY 9B / I-87 / A-15 – Rouses Point, Canada, Montreal	Western terminus of US 2; serves Rouses Point station
Lake Champlain			0.87 0.000	1.40 0.000	Korean Veterans Memorial Bridge (New York–Vermont state line)	
Vermont	Grand Isle	Alburgh	3.152	5.073	VT 225 north – Noyan, QC	Southern terminus of VT 225
Vermont	Grand Isle	Alburgh	6.234	10.033	VT 78 east – Swanton	Western terminus of VT 78
Vermont	Grand Isle	Alburgh	11.633	18.721	VT 129 west – Isle Lamotte	Eastern terminus of VT 129
Vermont	Grand Isle	Grand Isle	25.609	41.214	VT 314 south – Grand Isle Station, NY State via Ferry	Northern terminus of VT 314
Vermont	Grand Isle	South Hero	28.504	45.873	VT 314 north – Lake Champlain Islands, NY State via Ferry	Southern terminus of VT 314
Vermont	Chittenden	Colchester	38.658– 38.921	62.214– 62.637	I-89 – Winooski, Burlington, Georgia, St. Albans, Montreal	Exit 17 on I-89
Vermont	Chittenden	Colchester	39.011	62.782	US 7 north – Milton	Western end of concurrency with US 7
Vermont	Chittenden	Colchester	41.901	67.433	VT 2A south – Essex Junction	Northern terminus of VT 2A
Vermont	Chittenden	Colchester	42.095	67.745	To VT 2A south – Essex Junction	Unsigned VT 127
Vermont	Chittenden	Colchester	43.542	70.074	VT 127 south (Blakely Road)	Northern terminus of VT 127
Vermont	Chittenden	Colchester	45.286– 45.358	72.881– 72.997	I-89 – St. Albans, Champlain Islands, Burlington	Exit 16 on I-89
Vermont	Chittenden	Winooski	46.369	74.624	VT 15 east (East Allen Street) to I-89 south – Essex Junction	Western terminus of VT 15; Roundabout
Vermont	Chittenden	Burlington	47.672	76.721	US 7 Alt. south (Riverside Avenue at Hyde Street)	Northern terminus of US 7 Alt.
Vermont	Chittenden	Burlington	48.612	78.233	US 7 south (South Willard Street) – Shelburne	Eastern end of concurrency with US 7
Vermont	Chittenden	South Burlington	49.619– 49.920	79.854– 80.338	I-89 – Montpelier, Winooski, St. Albans	Exit 14 on I-89
Vermont	Chittenden	South Burlington	50.447	81.187	VT 116 south (Hinesburg Road)	Northern terminus of VT 116
Vermont	Chittenden	Williston	53.777	86.546	VT 2A – Essex Junction, Hinesburg	
Vermont	Chittenden	Richmond	59.201	95.275	VT 117 west – Essex Junction	Eastern terminus of VT 117
Vermont	Chittenden	Richmond	59.234– 59.399	95.328– 95.593	I-89 – Burlington, Waterbury, Montpelier	Exit 11 on I-89
Vermont	Washington	Waterbury	74.080	119.220	VT 100 north to I-89 – Stowe, Morrisville	Western end of concurrency with VT 100
Vermont	Washington	Moretown	75.395	121.336	VT 100 south – Waitsfield, Warren	Eastern end of concurrency with VT 100
Vermont	Washington	Middlesex	79.819	128.456	VT 100B south – Moretown, Waitsfield, Warren	Northern terminus of VT 100B
Vermont	Washington	Montpelier	85.767	138.029	US 2 Bus. (State Street)	Western terminus of US 2 Bus.
Vermont	Washington	Montpelier	85.942	138.310	Montpelier State Highway (Memorial Drive) to I-89 – Burlington, White River Junction	Exit 8 on I-89
Vermont	Washington	Montpelier	86.368	138.996	US 2 Bus. / VT 12 – Worcester, Northfield	Eastern terminus of US 2 Bus.
Vermont	Washington	Montpelier	88.092	141.770	US 302 east	Western terminus of US 302; roundabout
Vermont	Washington	East Montpelier	92.781	149.317	VT 14 south – Barre	Western end of concurrency with VT 14
Vermont	Washington	East Montpelier	92.988	149.650	VT 14 north – North Montpelier, Hardwick	Eastern end of concurrency with VT 14
Vermont	Washington	Plainfield	95.831	154.225	VT 214 north – North Montpelier	Southern terminus of VT 214
Vermont	Washington	Marshfield	103.213	166.105	VT 215 north – Lower Cabot, Cabot	Southern terminus of VT 215
Vermont	Washington	Marshfield	104.350	167.935	VT 232 south – Groton	Northern terminus of VT 232
Vermont	Caledonia	Danville	112.554	181.138	VT 15 – Walden, Hardwick	Eastern terminus of VT 15
Vermont	Caledonia	Danville	118.219	190.255	VT 2B east	Western terminus of VT 2B
Vermont	Caledonia	St. Johnsbury	121.625– 122.252	195.736– 196.746	I-91 / US 2 Truck – White River Junction, Newport	Exit 21 on I-91
Vermont	Caledonia	St. Johnsbury	122.569	197.256	VT 2B west	Eastern terminus of VT 2B
Vermont	Caledonia	St. Johnsbury	123.558	198.847	US 5 south (Railroad Street)	Western end of concurrency with US 5
Vermont	Caledonia	St. Johnsbury	123.672	199.031	US 5 north (Railroad Street)	Eastern end of concurrency with US 5
Vermont	Caledonia	St. Johnsbury	126.506	203.592	VT 18 south to I-91 / I-93 – Waterford, Littleton NH	Northern terminus of VT 18
Vermont	Essex	Guildhall	150.416	242.071	VT 102 north – Guildhall, Bloomfield	Southern terminus of VT 102
Vermont	Essex	Guildhall	150.518	242.235	US 2 east – Lancaster, Bangor ME	Continuation into New Hampshire
1.000 mi = 1.609 km; 1.000 km = 0.621 mi: Concurrency terminus

== Suffixed routes ==
=== Vermont Route 2A ===
Vermont Route 2A
- Location: St. George–Colchester
- Length: 13.853 mi (22.294 km)

Vermont Route 2A (VT 2A) is a largely 13.853-mile (22.294 km) alternate route of US 2 between St. George and Colchester. It begins at VT 116 in St. George and continues north and west through Williston and Essex Junction before ending at US 2 and US 7 in Colchester. Much of the portion of VT 2A that runs through Williston has been expanded from two to four lanes, particularly the stretch between US 2 and I-89, to accommodate the many restaurants, offices, and stores that have been developed there.

==== Major intersections ====
The entire route is in Chittenden County.

Location	mi	km	Destinations	Notes
St. George	0.000	0.000	VT 116 – Hinesburg, Bristol, South Burlington	
Williston	4.911– 4.994	7.903– 8.037	I-89 – Montpelier, Burlington	Exit 12 on I-89
Williston	5.703	9.178	US 2 – Burlington International Airport, South Burlington, Williston	
Essex Junction	8.591	13.826	VT 15 (Pearl Street / Main Street) / VT 117 east (Maple Street) – Five Corners, Winooski	Western terminus of VT 117
Essex Junction	8.740	14.066	Central Street – Essex Junction station	
Essex	10.624	17.098	VT 289 east – Essex Susie Wilson Road to VT 15 west	Exit 7 on VT 289; current western terminus of VT 289
Colchester	13.626	21.929	To US 2 east / US 7 south (to VT 127) – Malletts Bay, Winooski, Burlington	Unsigned portion of VT 127
Colchester	13.853	22.294	US 2 west / US 7 north – Colchester, Milton	
1.000 mi = 1.609 km; 1.000 km = 0.621 mi

=== Vermont Route 2B ===
Vermont Route 2B
- Location: Danville–St. Johnsbury
- Length: 3.459 mi (5.567 km)

Vermont Route 2B (VT 2B) is an alternate route of US 2 between Danville and St. Johnsbury. The route begins across the street from the intersection of US 2 and Jamieson Road in Danville, first running south, then curving east at Parker Road, which began west of there at US 2 near a local restaurant. The rest of the road runs through rural Caledonia County and crosses a bridge over I-91 with no access, just south of exit 21 before finally terminating at US 2 in St. Johnsbury.

==== Major intersections ====
The entire route is in Caledonia County.

Location	mi	km	Destinations	Notes
Danville	0.000	0.000	US 2 / Jamieson Road	Western terminus
St. Johnsbury	3.459	5.567	US 2 to I-91 – St. Johnsbury, Danville	Eastern terminus
1.000 mi = 1.609 km; 1.000 km = 0.621 mi

== See also ==
- U.S. Route 2 Business (Montpelier, Vermont)
- U.S. Route 2 Truck (St. Johnsbury, Vermont)

U.S. Route 2
Previous state: Michigan	New York and Vermont	Next state: New Hampshire
