= Vermont Route 289 =

State highway in Chittenden County, Vermont, US

Vermont Route 289
- Chittenden County Circumferential Highway
- VT 289 highlighted in red

Route information
- Maintained by VTrans
- Length: 3.94 mi (6.34 km)
- Existed: October 1993–present

Major junctions
- West end: VT 2A in Essex
- VT 15 in Essex
- East end: VT 117 in Essex

Location
- Country: United States
- State: Vermont
- Counties: Chittenden

Highway system
- State highways in Vermont
← VT 279	→ US 302

Vermont Route 289 (VT 289) is a state highway located within the town of Essex, Vermont. It is a 3.94-mile-long (6.34 km) limited-access highway that extends from VT 2A southeast to VT 117 on the north bank of the Winooski River. Most of VT 289 is a two-lane undivided highway.

VT 289 opened to traffic in October 1993 and comprises part of the Chittenden County Circumferential Highway, a proposed partial beltway around the northern and eastern suburbs of Burlington. The highway is proposed to begin at VT 127 in Colchester and end at Interstate 89 (I-89) in Williston.

== Route description ==
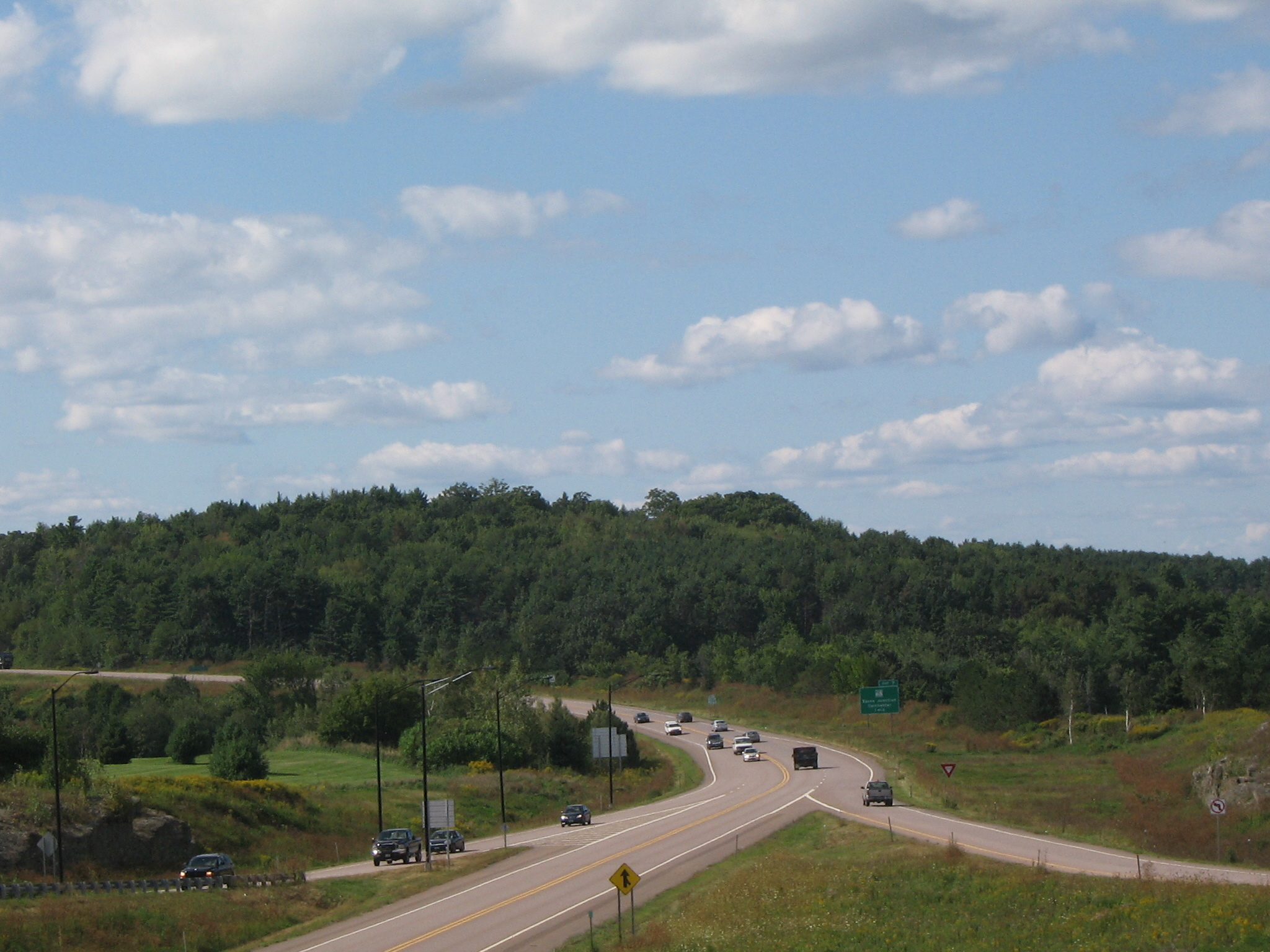
The Circ, facing northwest in Essex VT

VT 289 begins at a partial interchange with VT 2A in the town of Essex. The route heads eastward through a deep rock cut as it bypasses the village of Essex Junction to the north. After 0.5 miles (0.80 km), the rock cut gives way to a mixture of forests and open fields. VT 289 narrows from three to two lanes as it curves southeast to interchange with VT 15. East of VT 15, the highway veers eastward to meet Essex Way, then gradually turns to the south toward the Winooski River as it traverses several small hills.

Midway between Essex Way and the riverbank, several unused ramps intended for an interchange with Allen Martin Parkway extend outward from VT 289. The highway continues south to the Winooski River, where it terminates at a partial interchange with VT 117 east of Essex Junction. VT 289 is the first road in Vermont to have mile-based exit numbering.

== History ==
Interstate 289
- Location: Chittenden County

Plans for a partial beltway around the northern and eastern fringes of Burlington first surfaced in the late 1970s. The limited-access highway was initially intended to be 15.8 miles (25.4 km) long and four lanes wide, with two in each direction. After the United States Congress allocated $50 million (equivalent to $167 million in 2025) to the project in 1982, the highway was intended to be built as Interstate 289. The highway, named the Chittenden County Circumferential Highway, was to start at VT 127 in Colchester and travel southeast to Interstate 89 in Williston. Due to a lack of funding, it was to be initially constructed as a two-lane expressway. One of the main concerns that this road was to alleviate was the traffic congestion plaguing a five-way intersection in the center of Essex Junction.

In 1986, a final Environmental Impact Statement was co-released by the United States Department of Transportation and the Vermont Agency of Transportation (VTrans). Potential consequences of building a highway that met Interstate Highway standards in the area included noise impact on residential areas and disruption around archaeologically sensitive areas in the right-of-way. I-289 was effectively redesignated VT 289 when the Vermont General Assembly added the road to the state highway system that same year.

In planning, the road was divided into ten alphabetical segments, A through J, ordered from southeast to northwest. Segments C, D, E, and F in Essex were completed and opened to traffic in October 1993.

== Future ==
In May 2011, Vermont Governor Peter Shumlin announced that the Circumferential Highway, as originally conceived, would not be built, although the full right-of-way for the road had already been purchased. The Colchester and Williston portions are considered separate projects.

=== Segments A and B ===
On November 19, 2004, the United States Department of Transportation filed a notice of intent to complete an Environmental Impact Statement (EIS) on segments A and B of the proposed route; that is, the section between Interstate 89 in Williston and the current eastern terminus at VT 117 in Essex. This process has included meetings with the public to discuss the proposed project, as well assess alternatives. Some of the "short-list" include placing rotaries along VT 2A, or placing traffic lights along VT 289, when built. On August 3, 2007, a draft EIS was made available to the public. As planned, there would be one intermediate interchange on this segment of highway with IBM Road.

In February 2006, three separate public forums were held to discuss alternatives from the above short list and to allow the public to voice their concerns about present traffic situations. The first forum discussed VT 2A, which has become an arterial road due to substantial development in the late 1990s and early 2000s around I-89's exit 12 in Williston. It also serves as an artery for GlobalFoundries workers coming from the south and east. As a result, traffic on the highway has increased, and the road was quickly altered (additional lanes, lights, etc.) to accommodate what was then seen as a temporary problem.

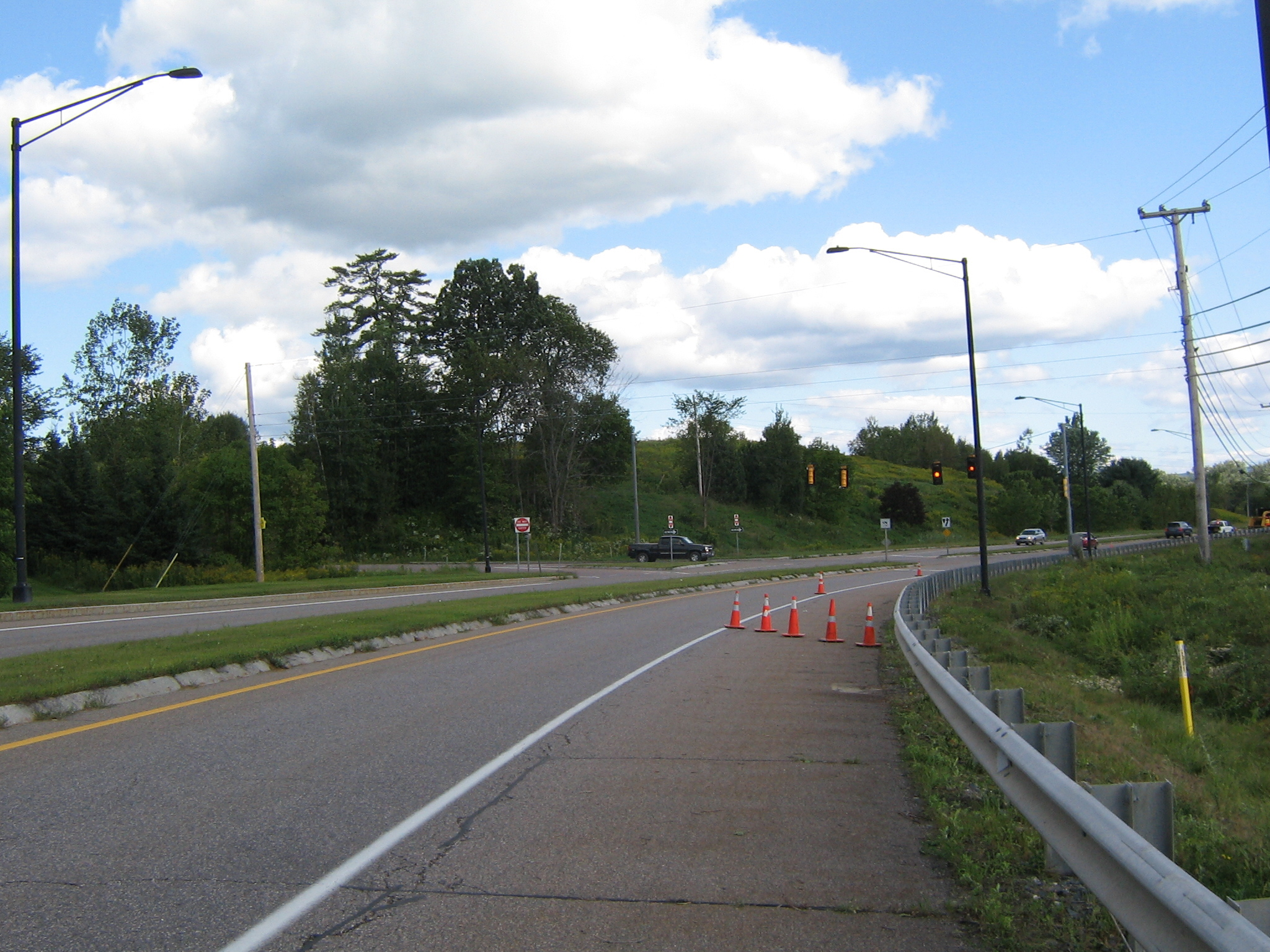
The current southern terminus of VT 289, an at-grade intersection with VT 117

A second forum focused on "Five Corners", the intersection in the center of Essex Junction. Concerns voiced included the fact that the intersection is the junction of three major state highways—VT 2A, VT 15, and VT 117—in a densely populated town center. While there was support for the construction of VT 289, others suggested that construction of the highway would result in neglect of the local roads and that the highway would be built as opposed to a bicycle and pedestrian bridge on VT 2A over the Winooski River.

A final forum was held on February 9, 2006 to discuss the actual proposed highway. Most comments at this forum were concerned with aesthetics, such as the implementation of noise barriers. Also discussed were future concerns, such as speculation on further growth in the area and the potential for VT 289 to be expanded into a four-lane highway.

=== Segments G through J ===
Segments G through J comprise the proposed western extension of VT 289 to VT 127 in Colchester. As proposed, there would be two intermediate interchanges along this section with I-89 and with Severance Road, a local highway providing access to U.S. Route 2 and U.S. Route 7.

== Exit list ==
Mileage is measured from the proposed western terminus of VT 289 at VT 127 in Colchester. The entire route is in Chittenden County.

If the boulevard alternative is constructed in Williston, instead of the Redmond Road exit, there will be intersections with Mountain View Road and Williston Road (US Route 2) before the interchange with I-89.

Location	mi	km	Exit	Destinations	Notes
Colchester	0.00	0.00	1	VT 127 – Colchester, Burlington	Proposed western terminus
Colchester			3	I-89 – Milton, Burlington	Proposed exit 16A on I-89
Colchester			5	Severance Road to US 2 / US 7 / VT 127 west	Eastern terminus of VT 127
Essex	7.86	12.65	7	VT 2A – Colchester, Essex Junction	Westbound exit and eastbound entrance; current western terminus
Essex	9.50	15.29	9	VT 15 – Essex	
Essex	9.90	15.93	10	Essex Way	
Essex	11.07	17.82	11	Allen Martin Parkway	Exit is marked in the VTrans route log but has not been constructed although some ramps are present
Essex	11.80	18.99	12	VT 117 – Essex	Eastbound exit and westbound entrance; current eastern terminus
Williston			13	Redmond Road	
Williston	15.10	24.30	15	I-89 – Montpelier, Burlington	Proposed eastern terminus; proposed exit 11A on I-89
1.000 mi = 1.609 km; 1.000 km = 0.621 mi: Incomplete access; Unopened

== See also ==
- List of highways named Circumferential Highway
