= Downtown Essex Junction Commercial Historic District =

Historic district in Vermont, United States

- U.S. National Register of Historic Places
- U.S. Historic district
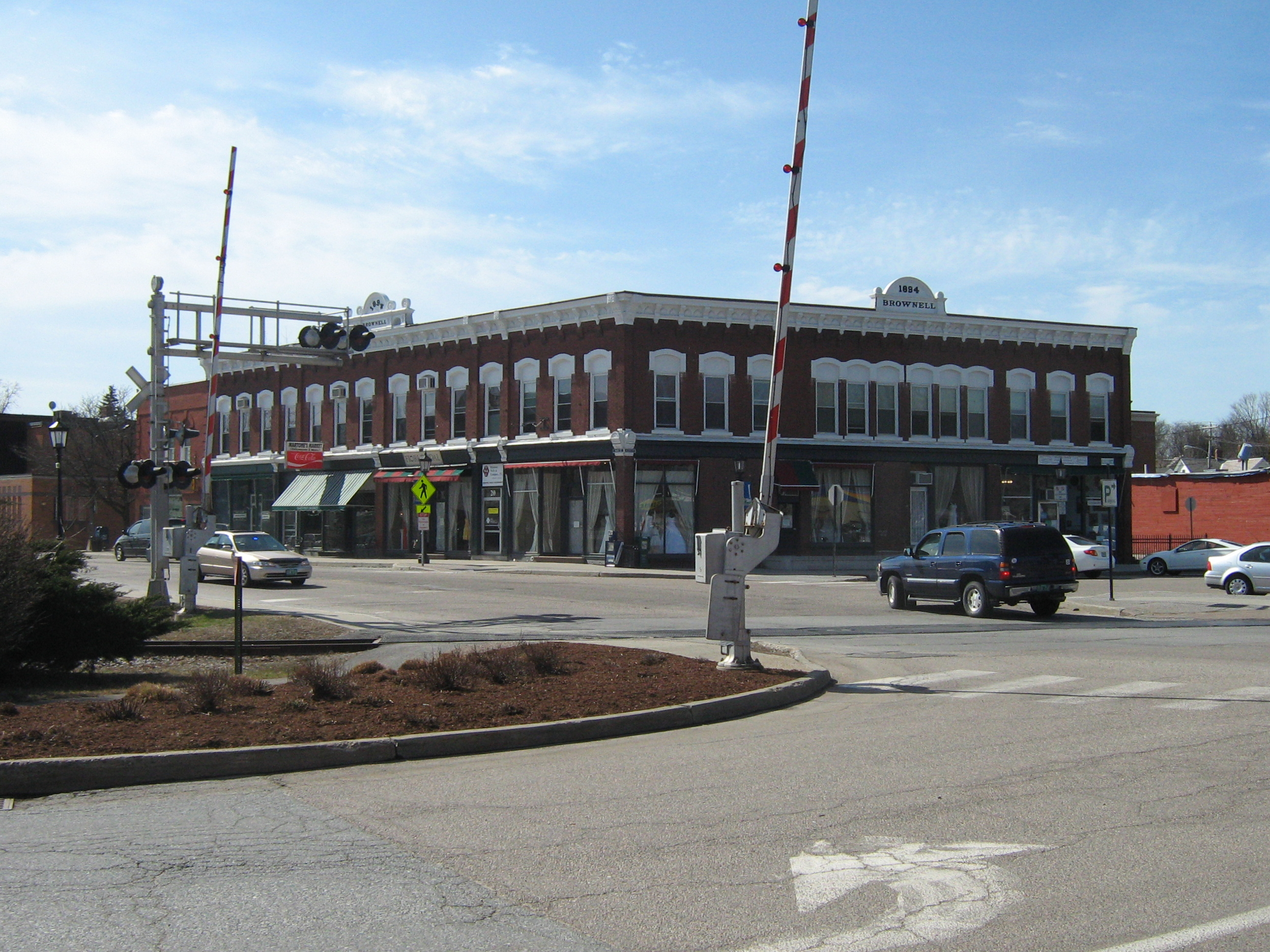

- Location within Vermont Location within the United States
- Location: 3-17 and 8-12 Main St., 2-28 Railroad Ave., and 2 Railroad St., Essex Junction, Vermont
- Coordinates: 44°29′36″N 73°6′35″W
- Area: 2.8 acres (1.1 ha)
- Built: 1893
- Architect: Guernsey, George
- Architectural style: Greek Revival, Italianate
- NRHP reference No.: 04001216
- Added to NRHP: November 1, 2004

The Downtown Essex Junction Commercial Historic District encompasses the historically railroad-dominated portion of downtown Essex Junction, Vermont. Aligned along the south side of Railroad Avenue and adjacent portions of Main Street, the area underwent most of its development between 1900 and 1940, when Essex Junction served as a major regional railroad hub. The district was listed on the National Register of Historic Places in 2004.

== Description and history ==
The village of Essex Junction originally developed in the early 19th century as a mill village, based on the water power of the adjacent Winooski River. With the advent of the railroads, the village, benefiting from its proximity to Burlington, Vermont's largest city, became a major regional railroad hub, with six different railroad lines meeting in the area. The downtown area was almost completely destroyed by a fire in 1893, but was rebuilt in the following decades. Although the railroads declined in use after World War II, the village continues to serve freight traffic, and has a passenger station on Amtrak's Vermonter service.

The central focal point of the historic district is the Brownell Block, a two-story brick commercial building (pictured) at the western corner of Main Street and Railroad Avenue. It extends on the southwest side of Railroad Avenue to Central Street, and along Main Street from the "Five Corners" junction (Main, Pearl, Maple, Park, and Lincoln Streets) to Railroad Street, just across the Amtrak railroad tracks. The twelve buildings in this area are typically two stories in height. Most are of wood frame construction, but many have been faced in brick; only two buildings are of entirely masonry construction. Half the buildings were built before 1900, with only one (3 Main Street) predating the 1893 fire. Only one building (a former grocery store at 26 Railroad Avenue) was built after 1920.

== See also ==
- National Register of Historic Places listings in Chittenden County, Vermont
