= Ethan Allen Homestead =

Historic house in Vermont, United States

- U.S. National Register of Historic Places
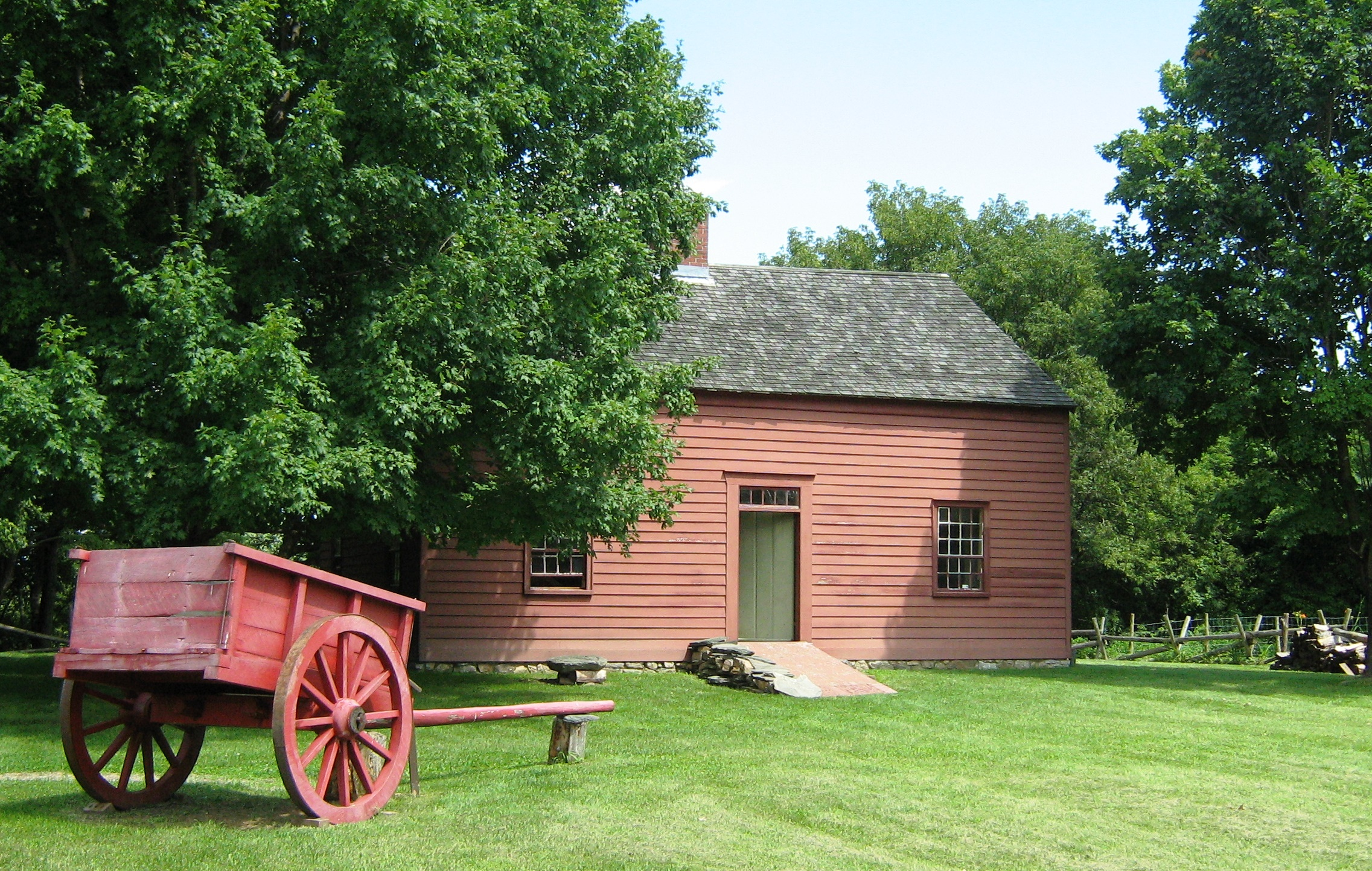

- Location within Vermont Location within the United States
- Location: 1 Ethan Allen Homestead, Burlington, Vermont
- Coordinates: 44°30′29″N 73°13′48″W
- Area: 140 acres (57 ha)
- Built: 1787
- NRHP reference No.: 86002265
- Added to NRHP: July 24, 1986

The Ethan Allen Homestead is a historic house museum at 1 Ethan Allen Homestead in Burlington, Vermont. It was built about 1787 by Ethan Allen, and is the only surviving residence of his in the state. It is open to the public annually from May to October. It was listed on the National Register of Historic Places in 1986.

== History ==
Ethan Allen (1738-1789) is widely revered as one of Vermont's greatest early public figures. Born in Connecticut, he speculated extensively with his brothers and other extended family members in land in Vermont, and was an instrumental figure in securing the territory's independence from New York and its eventual statehood. In his later years he settled on a farm of 1,400 acres (570 ha) in the Winooski River valley, and probably built this house a few years before his death. In the 19th and 20th centuries the property was owned by others, but was generally recognized as having been Allen's. In the late 1980s a surviving remnant of the farm property was turned into a park and museum.

== Description ==
The house is a modest 1 1/2-story post-and-beam structure, with a gable roof and clapboarded exterior. Its main facade is three bays wide, with a center entrance framed by simple molding and topped by a four-light transom window and cornice. The interior of the house follows a Georgian central-chimney plan, although the original massive brick chimney has been removed. The house is set on the floodplain of the Winooski River, between it and Vermont Route 127.

== See also ==
- National Register of Historic Places listings in Chittenden County, Vermont
- List of the oldest buildings in Vermont
