= Martin Chittenden House =

Historic house in Vermont, United States

- U.S. National Register of Historic Places
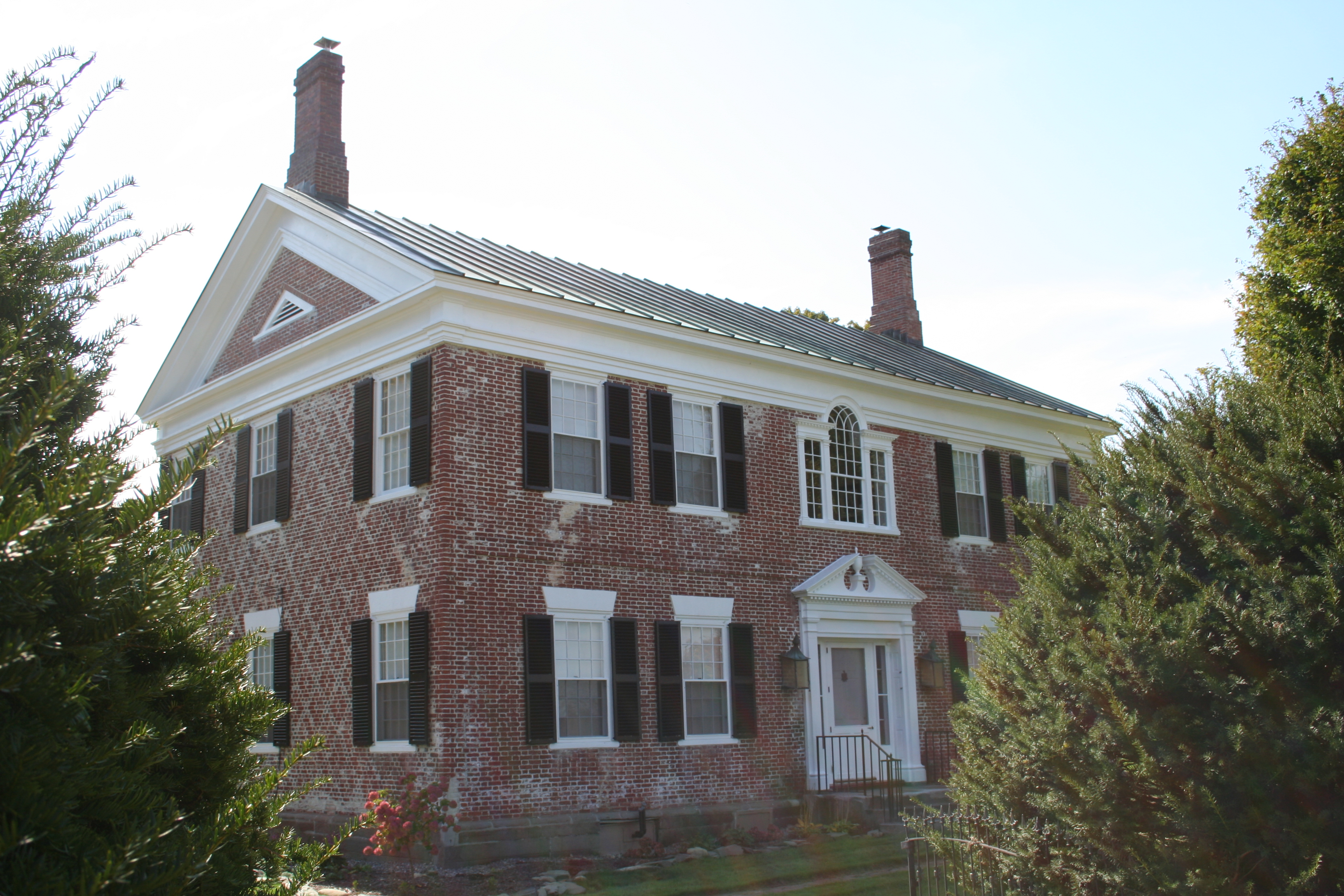

- Location within Vermont Location within the United States
- Location: VT 117, Jericho, Vermont
- Coordinates: 44°27′28″N 73°1′13″W
- Area: 3 acres (1.2 ha)
- Built: 1790
- Built by: Thomas Chittenden
- Architectural style: Federal
- NRHP reference No.: 78000230
- Added to NRHP: January 9, 1978

The Martin Chittenden House is a historic house on Vermont Route 117 in Jericho, Vermont. Built in the 1790s, it is one of the highest-style Federal period houses in Chittenden County, with a distinctive brickwork exterior and numerous unusual interior features. It was built by Thomas Chittenden for his son Martin, both of whom served as Governor of Vermont. The house was listed on the National Register of Historic Places in 1978.

== Description and history ==
The Martin Chittenden House stands in a rural area of southwestern Jericho, on the west side of River Road (VT 117) overlooking the Winooski River. It is a 2 1/2-story brick building, five bays wide and three deep, with a side gable roof and end chimneys. The brick of the front is laid in Flemish bond, while the sides are laid in Flemish cross bond, giving a diamond cross pattern to those surfaces. The main entrance is at the center of the north-facing front facade, recessed with sidelight windows. The opening is framed by pilasters and a broken pediment, and there is a Palladian window in the second floor above. The interior follows a central hall plan, with two chambers on either side of the central hall. The front left parlor has a distinctive carved fireplace overmantel surround, which surrounds a period wall painting with patriotic themes. The interior of the attic spaces preserves the framework of a hip roof.

The house's construction date is uncertain; it was probably built about 1796, when Martin Chittenden married, and was most likely a wedding present from Martin's father Thomas. Thomas Chittenden was Vermont's first governor, and Martin continued the political activities of his father, serving as governor during the War of 1812. This house, along with others built by Thomas Chittenden for his other sons, rank among the most imposing houses of the period in the area. The artwork over the parlor fireplace mantel is one of the most distinctive and well-preserved examples of patriotic folk art of the period.

== See also ==
- National Register of Historic Places listings in Chittenden County, Vermont
