= Bert Abbey =

American baseball player and coach (1869–1962)

- Pitcher
- Born: November 11, 1869; Essex, Vermont, U.S.
- Died: June 11, 1962 (aged 92); Essex Junction, Vermont, U.S.
- Batted: Right Threw: Right

MLB debut
- June 14, 1892, for the Washington Senators

Last MLB appearance
- September 23, 1896, for the Brooklyn Bridegrooms

MLB statistics
- Win–loss record: 22–40
- Earned run average: 4.52
- Strikeouts: 161
- Stats at Baseball Reference

Teams
- Washington Senators (1892); Chicago Colts (1893–1895); Brooklyn Grooms/Bridegrooms (1895–1896)

Bert Wood Abbey (November 11, 1869 – June 11, 1962) was an American Major League Baseball (MLB) pitcher.

== Amateur career ==
After graduating from Vermont Academy in 1887, Abbey first began playing baseball as a freshman in college, when he recruited fellow students to form the Vermont Catamounts (UVM) team. At UVM, he made the baseball and training program progress quickly with his presence as player, coach, and captain. He graduated in 1891 from UVM, and the year after, Abbey's team at the university won almost every game they played, including games against professional teams.

== Professional career ==
After his graduation, Abbey was drafted by the Washington Senators, with whom he pitched 14 games before being sold to the Pittsburgh Pirates. He was sent down to their farm team in Macon, Georgia. In 1893, the Chicago Colts bought his services, and he remained with them until 1895, when he moved to the Brooklyn Grooms.

Abbey stayed with Brooklyn (renamed the Bridegrooms) for one more season. He played his last game in the majors on September 23, 1896, and pitched three more seasons in the minor leagues before retiring.

== Death and legacy ==
Abbey died at the age of 92 in Essex Junction, Vermont less than a year after suffering a heart attack. He is buried at the Mountain View Cemetery in Essex Junction.

He was posthumously inducted into UVM's Athletic Hall of Fame in 1969.

== Quotation ==
- "Baseball's okay in college, but no place for a man with brain!"
