= Vermont Route 127 =

State highway in Chittenden County, Vermont, US

Vermont Route 127
- Map of Chittenden County in western Vermont with VT 127 highlighted in red

Route information
- Maintained by VTrans, the City of Burlington and the Town of Colchester
- Length: 10.08 mi (16.22 km): Southern segment: 9.94 miles (16.00 km); Northern segment: 0.142 mi (0.229 km)
- Existed: Early 1940s–present

Major junctions
- South end: Pearl Street in Burlington
- US 2 / US 7 in Colchester US 2 / US 7 in Colchester
- North end: VT 2A in Colchester

Location
- Country: United States
- State: Vermont
- Counties: Chittenden

Highway system
- State highways in Vermont
← VT 125	→ VT 128

Vermont Route 127 (VT 127) is a state highway in Chittenden County, Vermont, United States. It currently exists in two segments: a signed, locally maintained portion in the city of Burlington and the town of Colchester, and an unsigned, state-maintained portion within the town of Colchester. The southern terminus of the signed segment is at Pearl Street in downtown Burlington. Its northern terminus is at U.S. Route 2 and U.S. Route 7 in Colchester. The unsigned segment is little more than the southern leg of a wye connection between US 2 / US 7 and VT 2A.

VT 127 was assigned in the early 1940s as a loop route off US 2 and US 7 through Burlington and southern Colchester, where it ended at the junction of Bay Road and US 2 / US 7. It was extended slightly eastward to VT 2A in 1950. The majority of the route in Burlington was moved onto a new limited-access highway—named the Winooski Valley Parkway and also known as the Burlington Beltline—in the 1970s and 1980s. A later realignment in Colchester moved the signed northern terminus of VT 127 to the junction of Blakely/Severance Road and US 2 / US 7; however, the portion of VT 127 added in 1950 was left unchanged. As a result, the route now exists in two segments.

== Route description ==
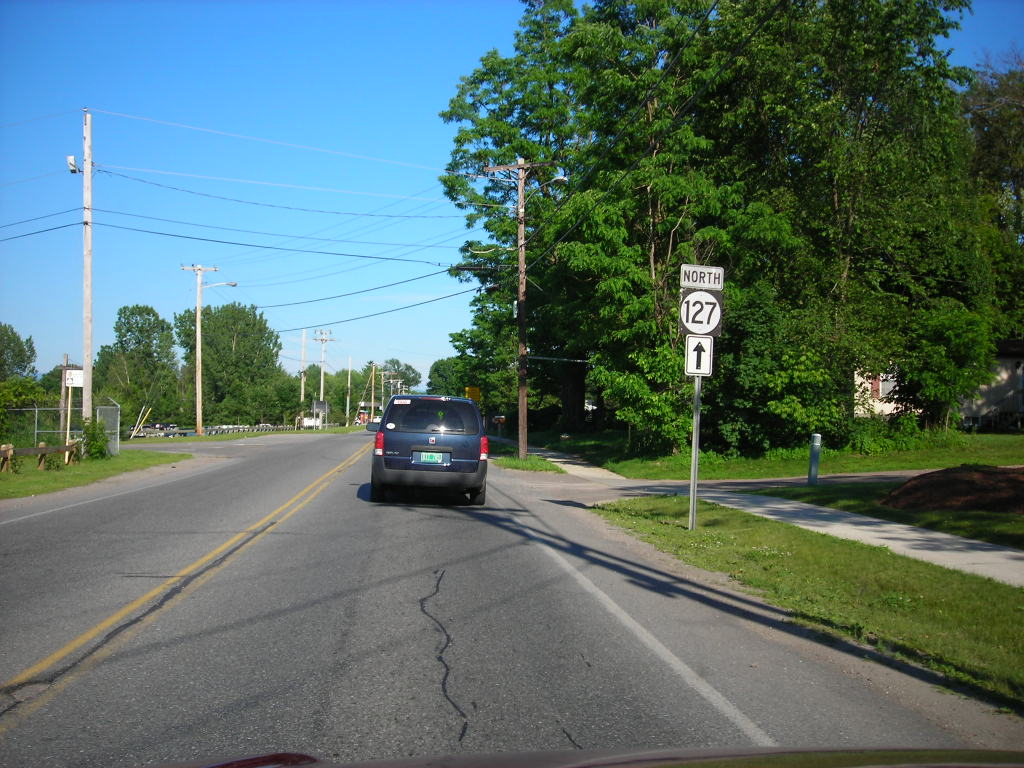
Route 127 heading northbound through Colchester as a two-lane roadway (West Lakeshore Drive)

VT 127 begins at Pearl Street in the city of Burlington. The route heads north as a one-way couplet along North Champlain Street (northbound) and Park Street (southbound) through the Old North End of the city to Manhattan Drive. VT 127 northbound follows Manhattan Drive for one block west to Park Street, where both directions of VT 127 come together and turn onto a two-lane limited-access highway named the Winooski Valley Parkway and locally known as the Burlington Beltline. The route has one interchange with North Avenue and another with Plattsburgh Avenue, before reverting to an at-grade highway at the Winooski River.

Now in Colchester, VT 127 heads north along Heineberg Drive and Prim Road to West Lakeshore Drive. It then travels east along the shoreline of Malletts Bay to Blakely Road, where it continues eastward onto Blakely to its northern terminus, as signed, at US 2 and US 7. However, another segment of VT 127 exists farther north in Colchester as the southern leg of the wye connection between US 2 / US 7 and VT 2A. This part of VT 127 is not signed as such; it is marked as "To VT 2A" from northbound US 2 and US 7 and "To VT 127" from northbound VT 2A.

== History ==
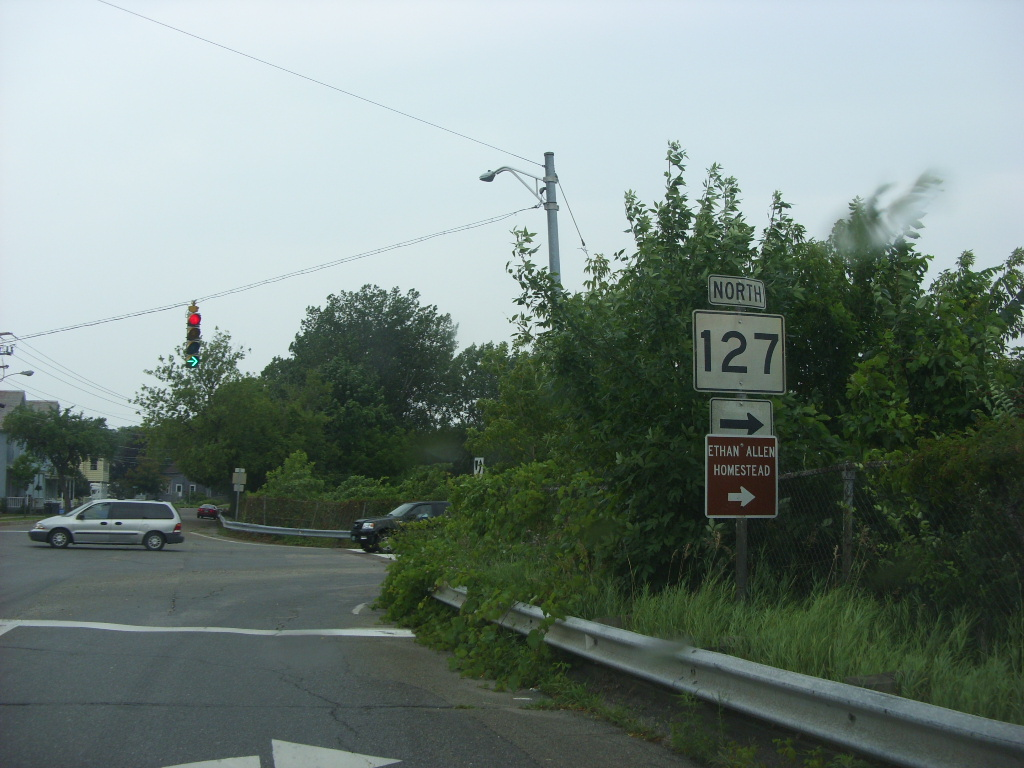
Route 127 turns northward onto the Winooski Valley Parkway towards the Ethan Allen Homestead

VT 127 was assigned in the early 1940s as a loop route off U.S. Route 2 and U.S. Route 7 between the city of Burlington and the village of Colchester by way of the Burlington Bay and Malletts Bay shorelines. A short, 0.147-mile-long (0.237 km) highway between US 2 / US 7 and VT 2A was added to the state highway system in 1950 as an extension of VT 127.

VT 127 originally began at the junction of Pearl Street and Winooski Avenue in Burlington and followed Pearl Street, North Avenue, and Plattsburg Avenue through the city. A new limited-access highway, named the Burlington Beltline, was built ca. 1971 between Manhattan Drive and North Avenue near the Ethan Allen Homestead. It was added to the state highway system in 1971 as a realignment of VT 127. The route now left Pearl Street at Park Street and followed Park north to the southern end of the new highway. Ownership and maintenance of the Burlington Beltline was transferred to the city of Burlington in 1980. An extension of the Beltline northwest to the Winooski River opened to traffic as part of VT 127 in the mid-1980s. VT 127 was later truncated to the junction of Pearl and Park Streets.

In Colchester, VT 127 was initially routed on Heineberg Drive, Porters Point Road, Church Road, Lakeshore Drive, and Bay Road. The route was realigned through the town between 1982 and 2005 to follow Prim Road, a northward continuation of Heineberg Drive, to Lakeshore Drive, and to follow Blakely Road to US 2 and US 7, bypassing East Lakeshore Drive and Bay Road. The latter realignment severed the locally maintained portion of VT 127 from the state-maintained section to the north; however, the latter is still designated, though not signed, as part of VT 127.

== Future ==
VT 127 has a proposed interchange with VT 289 near the Heineberg bridge in Colchester.

== Major intersections ==
=== Southern segment ===
The entire route is in Chittenden County.

Location	mi	km	Destinations	Notes
Burlington	0.00	0.00	Pearl Street	To US 2 and US 7
Burlington	0.57	0.92	Park Street	Northern extent of one-way couplet along Champlain and Park Streets
Burlington	1.75	2.82	North Avenue via VT 127 Conn.	Interchange
Burlington			Plattsburg Avenue	Former routing of VT 127
Colchester	7.21	11.60	East Lakeshore Drive	Former routing of VT 127
Colchester	9.94	16.00	US 2 / US 7	
1.000 mi = 1.609 km; 1.000 km = 0.621 mi

=== Northern segment ===
The entire route is in Colchester, Chittenden County.

mi	km	Destinations	Notes
0.000	0.000	US 2 / US 7	Opposite Bay Road
0.142	0.229	VT 2A	
1.000 mi = 1.609 km; 1.000 km = 0.621 mi

== VT 127 Connector ==
Vermont Route 127 Connector
- Location: Burlington
- Length: 0.37 mi (600 m)

Vermont Route 127 Connector is an unsigned connector route between VT 127 and North Avenue in northern Burlington. The 0.37-mile-long (0.60 km) route consists solely of the interchange between the two highways.
