= Vermont Route 15 =

State highway in northern Vermont, US

Vermont Route 15
- Grand Army of the Republic Highway
- VT 15 highlighted in red, VT 15A highlighted in blue

Route information
- Maintained by VTrans
- Length: 68.957 mi (110.976 km)
- Existed: 1922–present

Major junctions
- West end: US 2 / US 7 in Winooski
- VT 289 in Essex; VT 100 near Morrisville
- East end: US 2 in Danville

Location
- Country: United States
- State: Vermont
- Counties: Chittenden, Lamoille, Caledonia

Highway system
- State highways in Vermont
← VT 14	→ VT 16
← Route 14	N.E.	→ Route 16

Vermont Route 15 (VT 15) is a 68.957-mile-long (110.976 km) east–west state highway in northern Vermont, United States. Its western terminus is at U.S. Route 2 (US 2) and US 7 in Winooski and its eastern terminus is at US 2 in Danville. It is known as the Grand Army of the Republic Highway, a designation shared nationally with U.S. Route 6.

Its numbering originates from when it was part of New England Interstate Route 15 in the 1920s. Most of New England Route 15 is now U.S. Route 2 (from Danville, Vermont to Houlton, Maine).

Vermont Route 15A is a spur route of VT 15 into the village of Morrisville. VT 15A begins at VT 15 and ends at VT 100.

== Route description ==
VT 15 begins as East Allen Street in the center of Winooski at the rotary-style intersection with Main Street (US 2 and US 7). It proceeds east for 0.6 miles (0.97 km) to a partial interchange with I-89 (at Exit 15). Right after the I-89 junction, VT 15 enters the town of Colchester, with the road becoming known as College Parkway. It runs for only 1.4 miles (2.3 km) in Colchester, passing by the Fort Ethan Allen military installation before entering the village of Essex Junction in the town of Essex. In Essex Junction, the road is known as Pearl Street and continues for about two miles (3.2 km) to the "Five Corners" intersection with VT 2A and VT 117 at the village center, near the Essex Junction-Burlington railroad station. It turns left onto Main Street at the village center and continues northeast out of the village for 1.6 miles (2.6 km) to a junction with the VT 289 expressway (at Exit 9). From there it continues east through Essex Center along Center Road and Jericho Road as it heads into the town of Jericho, soon entering the village of Jericho. As VT 15 continues past the village, it turns northward to enter the town of Underhill. It runs for about eight miles (13 km) in a northerly direction through mostly rural areas in the towns of Underhill and Westford before finally entering the town of Cambridge.

After entering Cambridge town, VT 15 meets the eastern end of VT 104 then turns eastward and begins following the path of the Lamoille River on its south bank. Half a mile later, VT 15 enters the village of Cambridge then crosses the Lamoille River to follow the north bank instead. VT 15 continues eastward for another two miles (3.2 km) to the village of Jeffersonville, crossing the Lamoille River again and intersecting with VT 108 in the center of the village. VT 15 continues northeast from the village for several miles, still following the Lamoille River, then turns sharply to the southeast with the river. VT 15 soon enters the town of Johnson, continuing southeast for about three miles (4.8 km) until it reaches the village of Johnson. In the center of the village, it has a junction with VT 100C, a spur route from southbound VT 100 to westbound VT 15. VT 15 continues southeast for 2.5 miles (4.0 km) into the town of Hyde Park. About 1.58 miles (2.54 km) beyond the town line, the road enters the village of Hyde Park, where it is joined from the north by VT 100. The VT 15/VT 100 overlap continues for another mile into the town of Morristown. Just north of the village of Morrisville, VT 100 separates from VT 15 to head south into the village, while VT 15 continues east. About 1.6 miles (2.6 km) further, VT 15's spur route, VT 15A, splits from VT 15 heading southwest into Morrisville. VT 15 continues its eastward trek into the town of Wolcott, running through mostly rural area for seven miles (11 km) through the town. It passes through the town center, before proceeding into the town of Hardwick.

In the town of Hardwick VT 14 joins VT 15 from the north and the pair continues into the town center, where VT 14 separates to the south. VT 15 travels east, still following the Lamoille River, for another 2.4 miles (3.9 km) until the junction with VT 16. VT 16 takes over the Lamoille River route as it heads northeast while VT 15 continues southeast. VT 15 soon enters the town of Walden and runs for about five miles (8.0 km) until it reaches the Walden town center. Past the town center, VT 15 turns sharply south towards Joe's Pond in the town of Danville. The road follows the north shore of Joe's Pond, turning from south to east until it ends at an intersection with U.S. Route 2 in the West Danville community.

Several of the most heavily trafficked sections of route 15 (such as the section between Morrisville and Cambridge, as well as between Jerico and Essex Center) are currently (June 2011) in very rough condition due to state and local road maintenance budget shortfalls and as well as recent harsh winters. Motorcycles in particular should take extra precautions.

== History ==

In 1922, the New England states adopted a region-wide route marking system. Major inter-state routes were assigned numbers between 1 and 99. The east–west route beginning in Burlington, Vermont, through Randolph, New Hampshire and Bangor, Maine, to Houlton, Maine was designated as New England Route 15. Within the state of Vermont, Route 15 followed modern US 2/US 7 to Winooski then modern VT 15 to Danville then modern US 2 to Lunenburg, where it crossed into Lancaster, New Hampshire. In late 1926, the U.S. Highway system was established nationwide and many of the New England inter-state routes became U.S. routes. In Maine and New Hampshire, U.S. Route 2 was designated on New England Route 15, continuing along Route 15 up to St. Johnsbury, Vermont. However, between St. Johnsbury and Burlington, US 2 was initially designated on a more southerly alignment, first heading south to Wells River, then northwest via Montpelier to Burlington (US 2 was later relocated between St. Johnsbury and Montpelier). The section of old New England Route 15 in Vermont from St. Johnsbury to Burlington became Vermont Route 15. The Vermont state highway system was established in 1931, with the state officially taking control over maintenance of VT 15. The route was streamlined to remove the unnecessary overlaps at both its ends, truncating it to its modern Winooski to West Danville designation.

== Major intersections ==
County	Location	mi	km	Destinations	Notes
Chittenden	Winooski	0.000	0.000	US 2 / US 7	Roundabout; western terminus
Chittenden	Winooski	0.596– 0.718	0.959– 1.156	I-89 south	Partial diamond interchange; exit 15 on I-89
Chittenden	Essex Junction	4.311	6.938	VT 2A / VT 117 east	Western terminus of VT 117
Chittenden	Essex	5.908– 5.968	9.508– 9.605	VT 289	Diamond interchange; exit 9 on VT 289
Chittenden	Essex	7.458	12.002	VT 128 north – Westford, Fairfax	Southern terminus of VT 128
Lamoille	Cambridge	23.685	38.117	VT 104 north – Fairfax, St. Albans	Southern terminus of VT 104
Lamoille	Cambridge	26.566	42.754	To VT 108 south – Jeffersonville, Stowe	
Lamoille	Cambridge	26.927	43.335	VT 108 to VT 109 – Bakersfield, Enosburg Falls	Roundabout
Lamoille	Johnson	35.910	57.792	VT 100C north – North Hyde Park, Eden, Newport	Southern terminus of VT 100C
Lamoille	Village of Hyde Park	40.303	64.861	VT 100 north – North Hyde Park, Eden	Roundabout; western end of concurrency with VT 100
Lamoille	Morristown	42.234	67.969	VT 100 south – Morrisville, Stowe	Roundabout; eastern end of concurrency with VT 100
Lamoille	Morrisville	43.905	70.658	VT 15A west – Morrisville, Stowe	Eastern terminus of VT 15A
Caledonia	Hardwick	54.974	88.472	VT 14 north – Newport	Western end of concurrency with VT 14
Caledonia	Hardwick	56.112	90.304	VT 14 south – Montpelier, Barre	Eastern end of concurrency with VT 14
Caledonia	Hardwick	58.521	94.180	VT 16 north – East Hardwick, Glover, Barton	Southern terminus of VT 16
Caledonia	Walden	63.407	102.044	VT 215 south – Cabot, Northfield	Northern terminus of VT 215
Caledonia	Danville	68.957	110.976	US 2 – Danville, St. Johnsbury, Montpelier	Eastern terminus
1.000 mi = 1.609 km; 1.000 km = 0.621 mi: Concurrency terminus; Incomplete access

== Suffixed routes ==
Vermont Route 15A
- Location: Morrisville
- Length: 1.824 mi (2.935 km)

VT 15A (1.824 miles (2.935 km)) is a short spur state highway located in Lamoille County serving as a connector from westbound VT 15 to Morrisville and southbound VT 100. The western terminus is at Vermont Route 100 in the center of Morrisville and the eastern terminus is at VT 15 in Morristown. VT 15A also intersects the northern terminus of Vermont Route 12 just east of VT 100.
