= The Essex Reporter =

- Type: Monthly newspaper
- Owner: O'Rourke Media Group
- Publisher: Jim O'Rourke
- Language: English
- Headquarters: 281 N Main Street; Saint Albans, Vermont 05478; United States
- OCLC number: 8768434
- Website: essexreporter.com

The Essex Reporter is a free monthly newspaper in Essex, Vermont. The paper also covers many other Vermont towns and cities such as, Jericho, Underhill and Winooski - with limited drops in Williston.

The Essex Reporter is a part of O'Rourke Media Group owned and published by Jim O'Rourke, who also owns the Sun in Colchester, Vermont and several other Vermont newspapers.

== History ==
In April 2020, the paper ceased its weekly print publication and moved to only publish content online. This was in response to the COVID-19 pandemic and loss of some top advertisers. The paper's print edition returned in September 2023, now published monthly.
