= Vermont Route 129 =

State highway in Grand Isle County, Vermont, US

Vermont Route 129
- Map of Grand Isle County in northwestern Vermont with VT 129 highlighted in red

Route information
- Maintained by VTrans
- Length: 5.415 mi (8.715 km)
- Existed: 1944–present

Major junctions
- West end: School and Church Streets in Isle La Motte
- East end: US 2 in Alburgh

Location
- Country: United States
- State: Vermont
- Counties: Grand Isle

Highway system
- State highways in Vermont
← VT 128	→ VT 130
← VT F-1	→ VT F-3

Vermont Route 129 (VT 129) is a short, 5.415-mile-long (8.715 km) connector route for Isle La Motte and Alburgh in the state of Vermont in the United States. VT 129 begins at an intersection in the centre of Isle La Motte, heads northward and terminates at an intersection with U.S. Route 2 (US 2) in Alburgh. The route originated as Vermont Route F-2 in 1926, and was the name of the road that approached a ferry to Chazy. Route F-2 followed the same routing as the current VT 129, to which it was renumbered in 1944.

== Route description ==
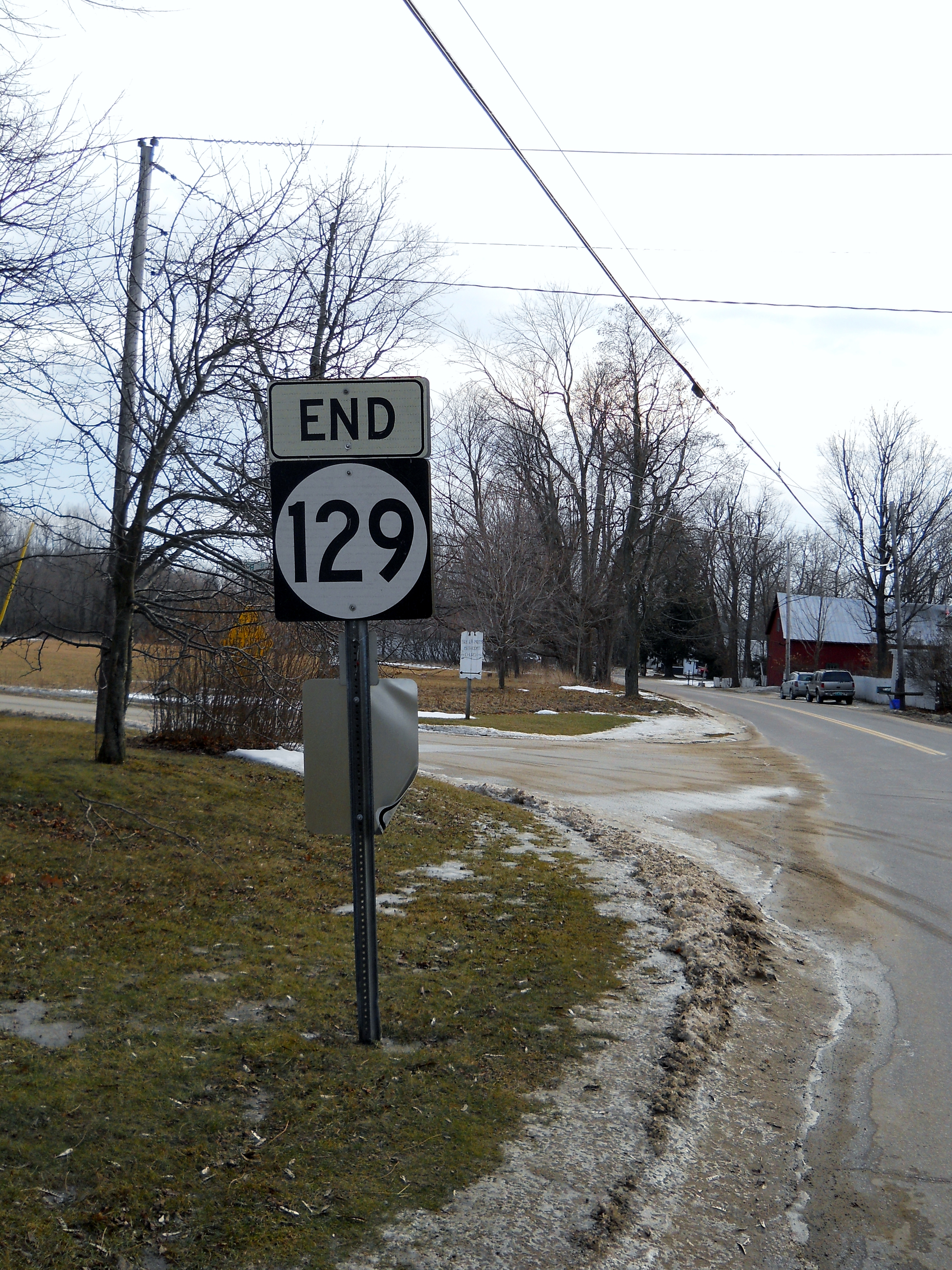
Western terminus of VT 129 in Isle La Motte

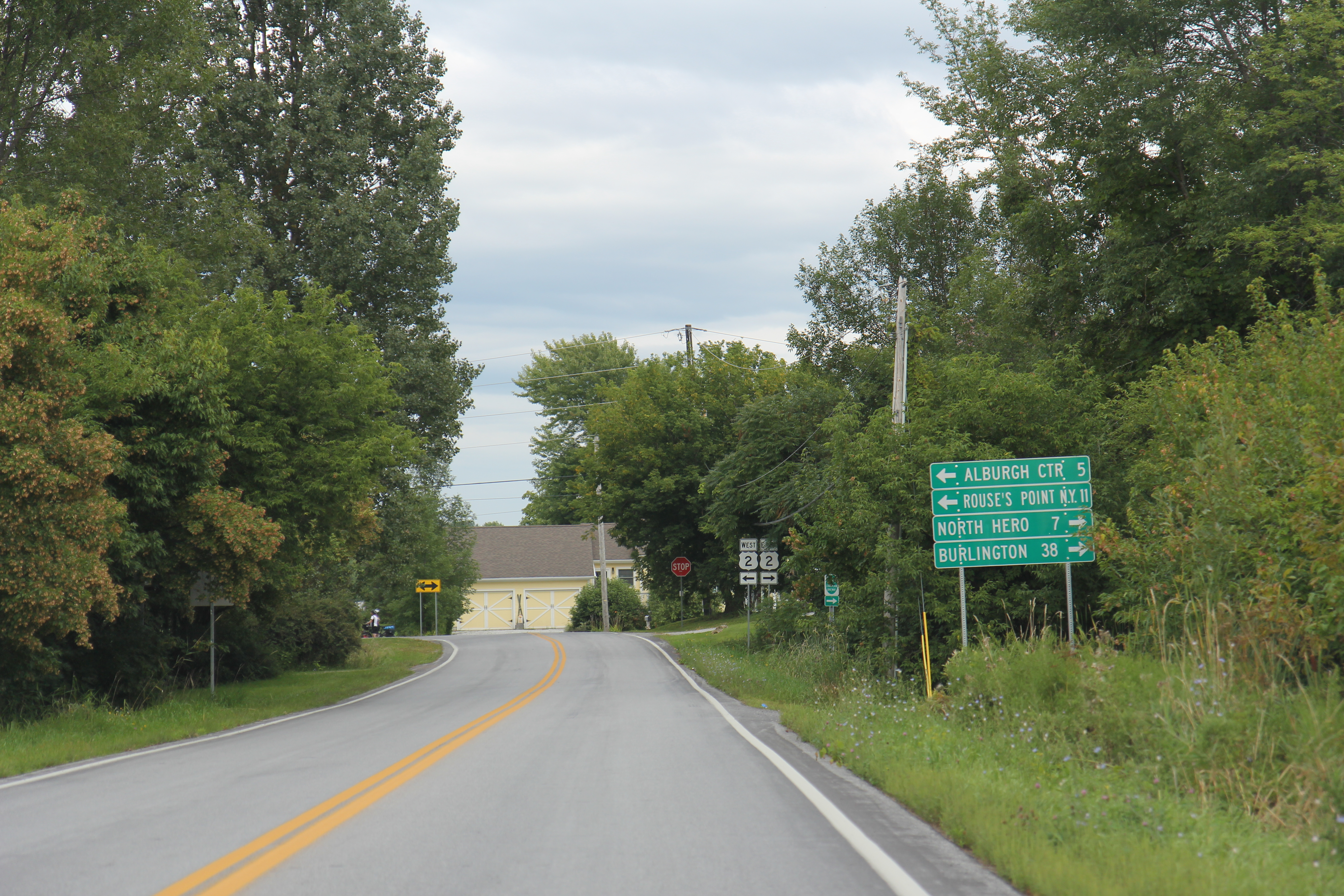
Looking east at eastern terminus at US 2

VT 129 begins at an intersection with School and Church Streets on Isle La Motte, heading northward as a portion of Main Street. This part of the highway is town maintained. VT 129 then heads north, intersecting with Shrine Road (Town Highway 2) before leaving Isle La Motte over a bridge for Alburgh. The highway turns eastward, intersecting with local roads and passing to the south of Alburg Golf Links. VT 129 then heads to the south, paralleling the shores of the La Motte Passage (a part of Lake Champlain). At a curve to the east, VT 129 intersects with a short extension of a nearby highway, which terminates quickly. The route leaves the connector and heads eastward towards US 2, soon terminating at an intersection with US 2 on the shores of another connector in South Alburgh.

== History ==
The entire length of Vermont 129 was originally designated as VT F-2 in 1926. VT F-2 originally went from US 2 to a ferry across Lake Champlain to Chazy, New York. Many of the F-x series routes along the shores of Lake Champlain were changed to new designations in the 1940s, 1950s, and 1960s. VT F-2 was redesignated by 1944 as VT 129. Between 1959 and 2008, VT 129 was truncated to School Street on Isle La Motte.

== Major intersections ==
The entire route is in Grand Isle County.

Location	mi	km	Destinations	Notes
Isle La Motte	0.000	0.000	School Street / Church Street	Western terminus
Alburgh	2.688	4.326	West Shore Road	Major Collector 0291 (Note: State-wide, unsigned numeric designation for town highways signed as state routes. A collector road is a civil engineering term meaning a road that connects populated areas with arterial highways)
Alburgh	5.415	8.715	US 2 – Alburgh, Rouses Point NY, North Hero, Burlington	Eastern terminus
1.000 mi = 1.609 km; 1.000 km = 0.621 mi
