= Vermont Route 215 =

State highway in northern Vermont, US

Vermont Route 215
- VT 215 highlighted in red

Route information
- Maintained by the Towns of Marshfield, Cabot, and Walden
- Length: 9.16 mi (14.74 km)

Major junctions
- South end: US 2 in Marshfield
- North end: VT 15 in Walden

Location
- Country: United States
- State: Vermont
- Counties: Washington, Caledonia

Highway system
- State highways in Vermont
| ← VT 214 | → VT 225 |

Vermont Route 215 (VT 215) is a 9.16-mile-long (14.74 km) state highway in northern Vermont, United States. It runs from an intersection with U.S. Route 2 (US 2) in Marshfield northeast to an intersection with VT 15 in Walden. Its main function is to serve the town of Cabot, home of the famous Cabot Creamery. Cabot is a rather isolated town, and VT 215 is the only major road to pass within a few miles of the town. The entirety of VT 215 is town-maintained.

VT 215 is a connection between US 2 and VT 15. Several other Vermont highways contain numbers similar to roadways that they connect, such as VT 232 between US 2 and US 302, and VT 214 between US 2 and VT 14. It is not clear if this is intentional or not, as other routes do not follow this convention.

== Route description ==
VT 215 begins at an intersection with US 2 in the town of Marshfield. The road runs northeast through a very isolated area of northeastern Washington County as it enters the Lower Cabot area. As it continues northeast, it enters Cabot and directly serves the downtown area near the creamery. VT 215 continues to the northeast through more isolated area in the extreme northeast of the county, before crossing into the town of Walden in Caledonia County, ending at VT 15 shortly thereafter. VT 215 does not intersect any numbered routes between its two endpoints.

== Major intersections ==
| County | Location | mi | km | Destinations | Notes |
|---|---|---|---|---|---|
| Washington | Marshfield | 0.00 | 0.00 | US 2 – Danville, St. Johnsbury, Plainfield, Montpelier | Southern terminus |
| Caledonia | Walden | 9.16 | 14.74 | VT 15 – Hardwick, Walden, West Danville | Northern terminus |
1.000 mi = 1.609 km; 1.000 km = 0.621 mi
