= Williston, Vermont =

- Town
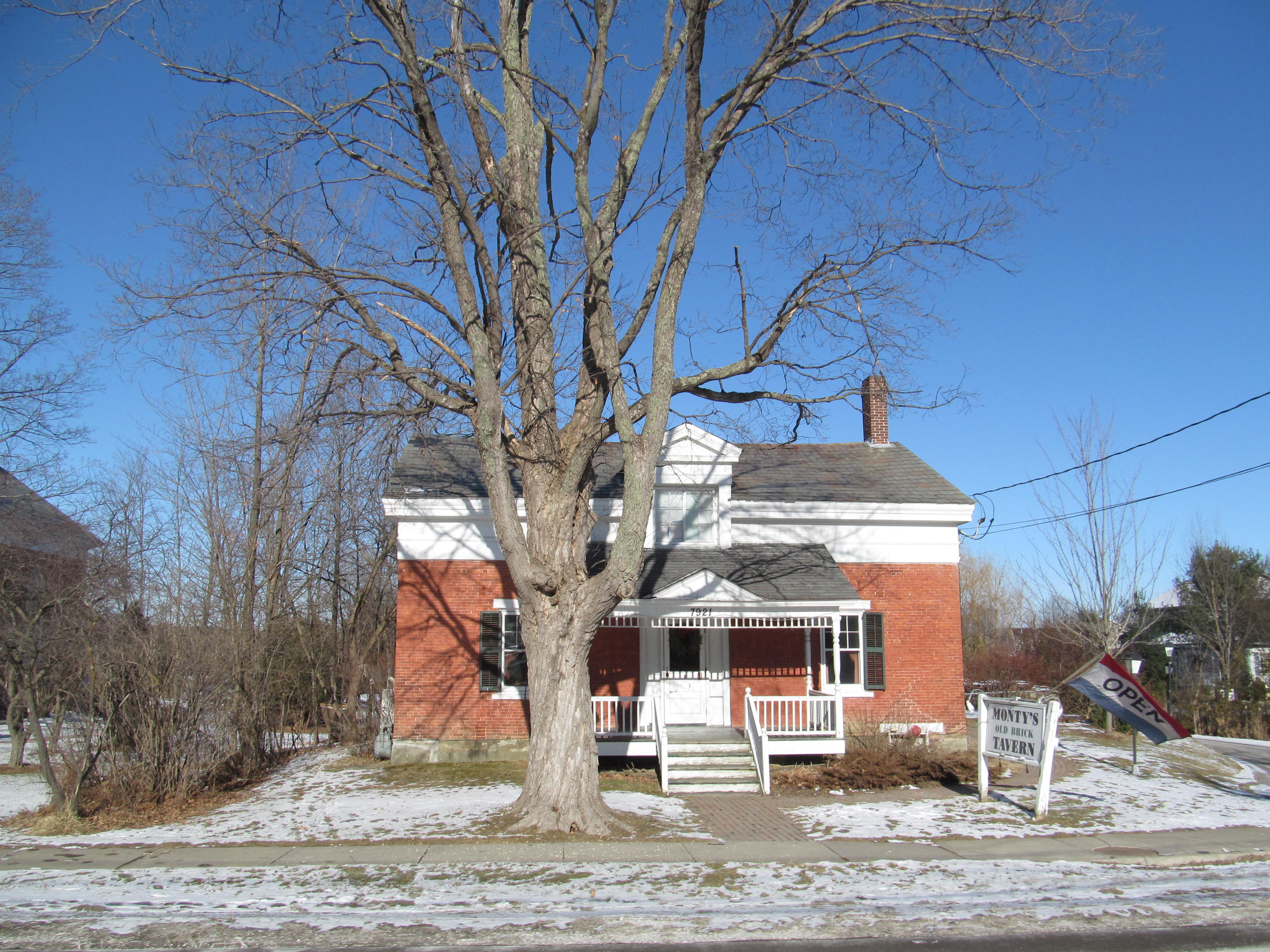
- Old Brick Tavern, Williston

- Seal
- Motto: "Old town charm, new town spirit"
- Location in Chittenden County and the state of Vermont
- Coordinates: 44°24′43″N 73°06′27″W
- Country: United States
- State: Vermont
- County: Chittenden
- Communities: Williston; North Williston; Kirby Corner

Area
  - Total: 30.6 sq mi (79.2 km^{2})
  - Land: 30.1 sq mi (77.9 km^{2})
  - Water: 0.50 sq mi (1.3 km^{2})
- Elevation: 604 ft (184 m)

Population (2020)
  - Total: 10,103
  - Density: 336/sq mi (130/km^{2})
- Time zone: UTC-5 (Eastern (EST))
  - Summer (DST): UTC-4 (EDT)
- ZIP Code: 05495
- Area code: 802
- FIPS code: 50-84475
- GNIS feature ID: 1462263
- Website: www.town.williston.vt.us

Williston is a town in Chittenden County, Vermont, United States. Originally rural and laid out with many farms, in recent decades it has developed into a thriving suburb of Burlington, Vermont's largest city. As of the 2020 census, Williston's population was 10,103, an increase of over 1,000 since the 2010 census. Williston is one of Vermont's fastest-growing towns and has become a major retail center for the Burlington area as well as much of central and northern Vermont. The town has a National Register Historic District in its unincorporated central village.

== History ==
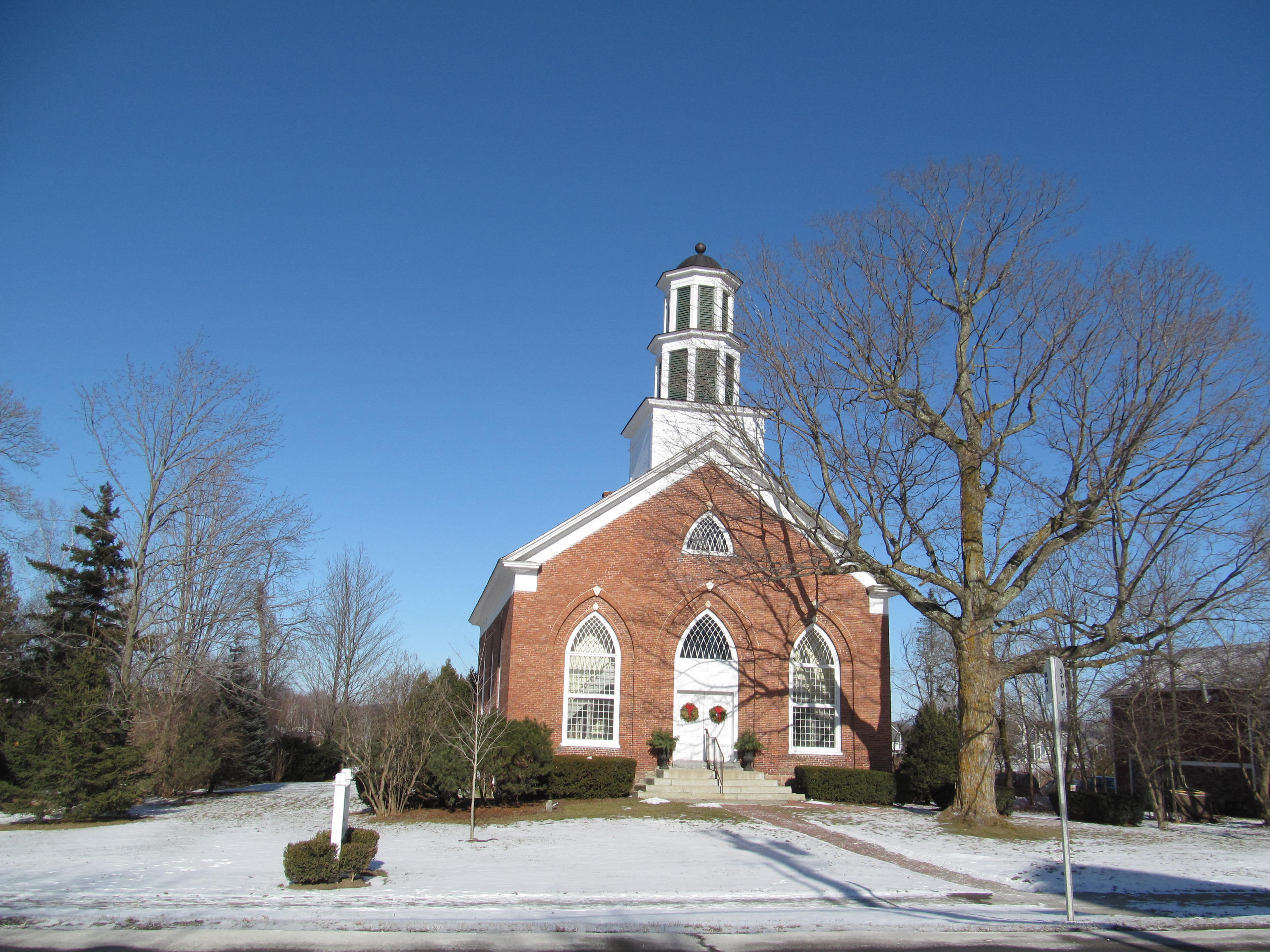
Williston Congregational Church

The town was chartered in the New Hampshire Grants in 1763 as a grant from Governor Benning Wentworth of the colony of New Hampshire. It was named for Samuel Willis, a New York merchant who was one of the original 65 grantees, though he never visited the town.

A private, boarding high school, Pine Ridge, was founded in 1968 to serve learning-disabled students. It closed in 2009.

The town is notable for its well-preserved central collection of brick 19th-century civic and religious buildings, including the "old Brick Church" of 1832, considered one of Vermont's finest country Gothic churches; the former Universalist Church, now the Town Hall, of 1860; the former Methodist Church of 1848, now the Town Annex; the former Town Hall, of around 1840; and the Federated Church of 1867, formerly the Methodist Episcopal Church, designed by Boston architect John Stevens. On the western side of the town, bordering South Burlington, is Vermont's largest mercantile development, with numerous "big box" stores and other commercial activity.

The town was also the home of several generations of the Chittenden family, for whom the surrounding county, Vermont's most populous, is named. Several original Chittenden family homes still stand. Thomas Chittenden, president of the Vermont Republic and the state's first governor, lived in Williston and is buried in the central cemetery, with a prominent memorial.

=== Events ===
During the night of July 7, 1984, an Amtrak Montrealer train with 287 people aboard hit a landslide and derailed, killing five people and injuring about 200. The accident triggered one of Vermont's most intensive emergency responses, but the final victims were not rescued until the end of the day.

== Geography ==
Williston is in central Chittenden County, bordered on the north by the Winooski River. The city of South Burlington is to the west. According to the United States Census Bureau, Williston has an area of 30.6 square miles (79.2 km^{2}), of which 30.1 square miles (77.9 km^{2}) is land and 0.50 square miles (1.3 km^{2}), or 1.65%, is water.

=== Brooks ===
Allen Brook drains the center of the town. It begins and flows from Mud Pond north to the village of Williston, and then northwest until it meets the Winooski River. It is 10 miles (16 km) long and drains a watershed of 6,900 acres (2,800 ha).

Muddy Brook flows on Williston's western edge and marks the border between Williston and South Burlington.

== Demographics ==
Historical population
Census	Pop.	Note	%±
1790	471		—
1800	836		77.5%
1810	1,185		41.7%
1820	1,246		5.1%
1830	1,608		29.1%
1840	1,554		−3.4%
1850	1,669		7.4%
1860	1,479		−11.4%
1870	1,441		−2.6%
1880	1,342		−6.9%
1890	1,161		−13.5%
1900	1,176		1.3%
1910	1,000		−15.0%
1920	929		−7.1%
1930	961		3.4%
1940	1,021		6.2%
1950	1,182		15.8%
1960	1,484		25.5%
1970	3,187		114.8%
1980	3,843		20.6%
1990	4,887		27.2%
2000	7,650		56.5%
2010	8,698		13.7%
2020	10,103		16.2%
U.S. Decennial Census

As of the census of 2010, there were 8,698 people, 2,921 households, and 2,141 families residing in the town. The population density was 252.1 people per square mile (97.4/km^{2}). There were 3,036 housing units at an average density of 100.1 per square mile (38.6/km^{2}). The racial makeup of the town was 95.6% White, 1.0% African American, 0.2% Native American, 2.0% Asian, 0.01% Pacific Islander, 0.10% from other races, and 1.1% from two or more races. Hispanic or Latino of any race were 1.5% of the population.

There were 2,921 households, out of which 36.8% had children under the age of 18 living with them, 65.1% were married couples living together, 5.3% had a female householder with no husband present, and 26.7% were non-families. 20.4% of all households were made up of individuals, and 7.9% had someone living alone who was 65 years of age or older. The average household size was 2.59 and the average family size was 3.02.

In the town, the population was spread out, with 27.5% under the age of 18, 4.1% from 18 to 24, 32.0% from 25 to 44, 24.6% from 45 to 64, and 11.7% who were 65 years of age or older. The median age was 39 years. For every 100 females, there were 95.8 males. For every 100 females age 18 and over, there were 91.6 males.

The median income for a household in the town was $61,467, and the median income for a family was $69,762. Males had a median income of $49,048, versus $31,740 for females. The per capita income for the town was $29,757. About 0.8% of families and 1.5% of the population were below the poverty line, including 0.8% of those under age 18 and 4.9% of those age 65 or over.

== Economy ==
One measure of economic activity is retail sales. Williston led the state in 2007 with $434.8 million. The part of town known as Taft Corners has several big-box stores and chain restaurants not found elsewhere in Vermont.

The U.S. Immigration and Customs Enforcement operates a large law enforcement center in Williston.

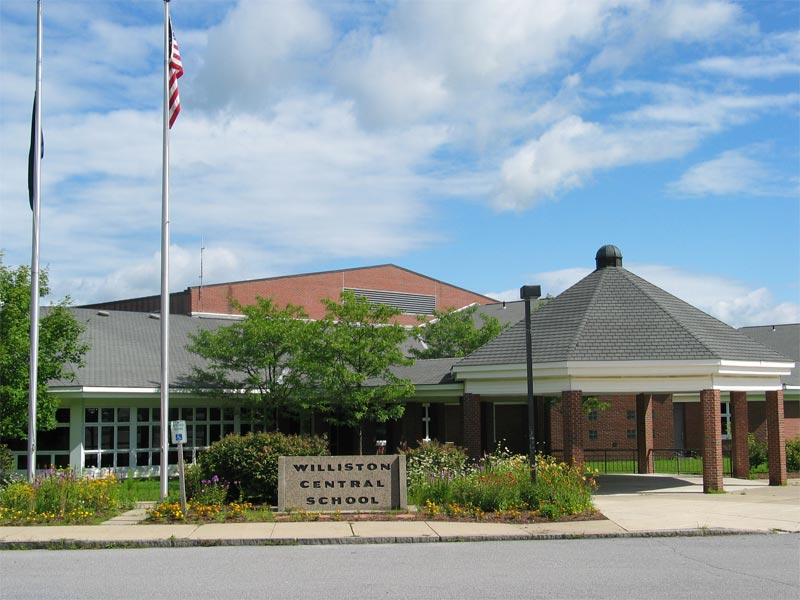
Williston Central School

== Education ==
Williston has two schools: Allen Brook School (pre-K–2) and Williston Central School (3–8).

The Williston school district is part of the Champlain Valley School District. Its students of high school age attend Champlain Valley Union High School, which it supports through taxation. Pine Ridge School, a boarding and day school that served students with learning disabilities and behavioral issues, was in Williston from its founding in 1968 until its closure in 2009.

== Infrastructure ==
=== Transportation ===
Bus service is provided by Chittenden County Transportation Authority. It brings residents and workers to South Burlington and Burlington, the system's central locations.

==== Major routes ====
Interstate 89 passes through Williston from east to west, though it is signed north–south. There is an interchange just south of downtown.

U.S. Route 2, also known as Williston Road, passes through town from east to west. Williston's historic village is along U.S. 2 in the center of town.

Vermont Route 2A provides a north–south route through town, connecting it to Hinesburg and Essex Junction. Much of the town's retail development, including nearly all its big-box stores, is along 2A, which runs through western Williston and intersects with I-89 and U.S. Route 2.

== Notable people ==
- Edwin Atwater, Canadian businessperson and politician
- James Edmund Burke, mayor of Burlington, Vermont
- Lucius E. Chittenden, attorney who served as Register of the U.S. Treasury during the American Civil War
- Martin Chittenden, U.S. congressman and governor of Vermont
- Thomas Chittenden, founder of the Republic of Vermont and first governor of Vermont
- Ben Cohen, entrepreneur and co-founder of Ben & Jerry's
- Bart Farley, professional soccer player and coach
- Jerry Greenfield, entrepreneur and co-founder of Ben & Jerry's
- Raul Hilberg, Austrian-born historian and leading scholar on the Holocaust
- Bradley J. LaRose, US Marshal for Vermont
- Virginia V. Lyons, member of the Vermont Senate
- Ross Miner, figure skater and skating coach
- Haviland Smith, retired CIA officer and former station chief
- Russell S. Taft, chief justice of the Vermont Supreme Court

== See also ==
- Vermont locations by per capita income
