= Essex, Vermont =

- Town
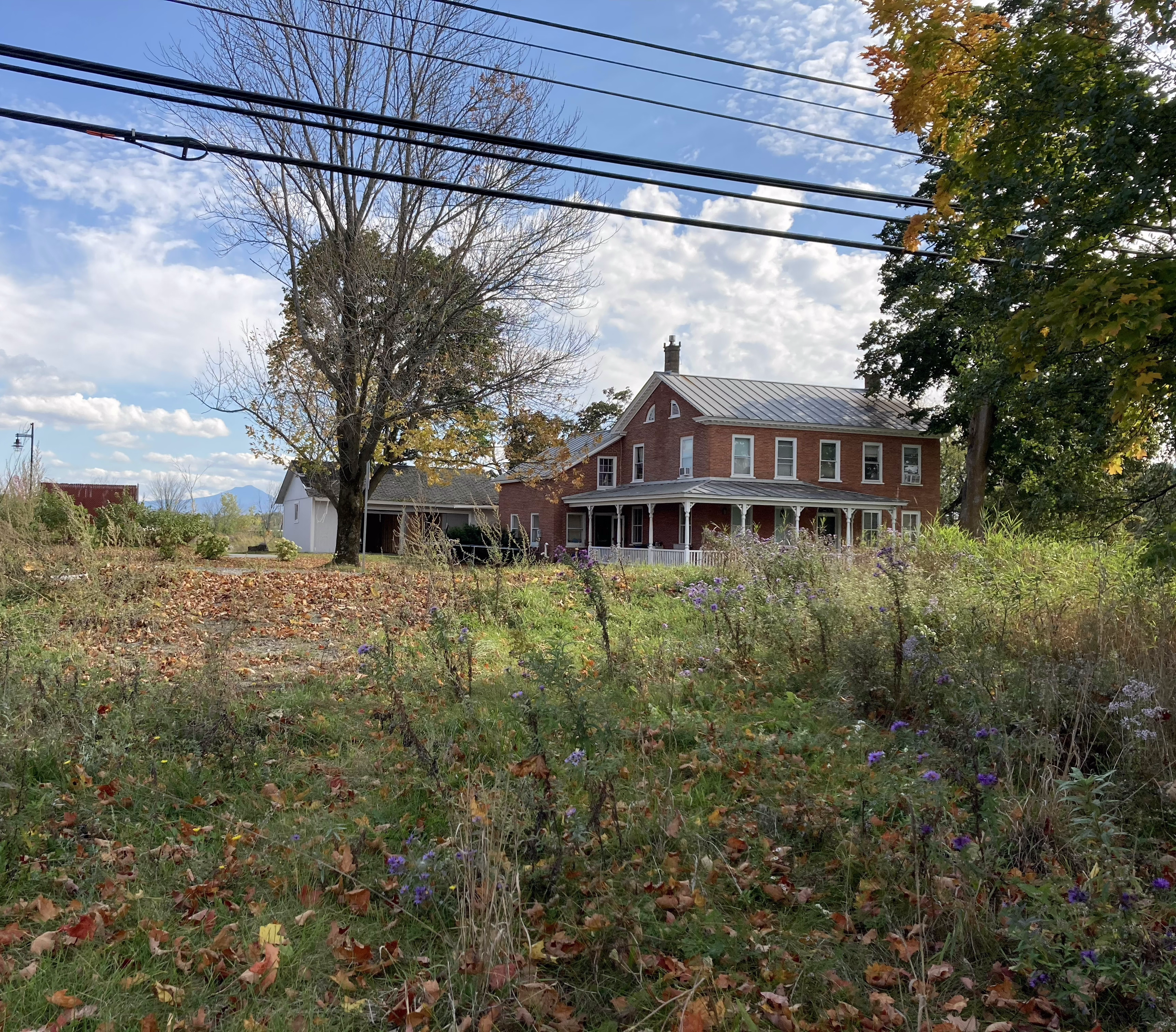
- The Roswell Butler House in Essex, VT

- Logo
- Motto: "Crossroads of Chittenden County"
- Location in Chittenden County and the state of Vermont
- Coordinates: 44°30′27″N 73°04′12″W
- Country: United States
- State: Vermont
- County: Chittenden
- Incorporated: June 7, 1763
- Communities: Essex Center; Butlers Corners; Pages Corner

Area
  - Total: 39.3 sq mi (101.8 km^{2})
  - Land: 38.8 sq mi (100.6 km^{2})
  - Water: 0.50 sq mi (1.3 km^{2})
- Elevation: 476 ft (145 m)

Population (2020)
  - Total: 22,094
  - Density: 568.8/sq mi (219.6/km^{2})
- Time zone: UTC−5 (Eastern (EST))
  - Summer (DST): UTC−4 (EDT)
- ZIP codes: 05451-05452
- Area code: 802
- FIPS code: 50-24175
- GNIS feature ID: 1462091
- Website: www.essexvt.gov

Essex is a town in Chittenden County, Vermont, United States. Vermont Route 289 crosses the town from east to west. The city of Essex Junction, with a population as of 2020 of 10,590, was located within the town as an incorporated village until 2022.

== History ==
Town vote to merge			Revote	
District	2006-11-07		2007-01-23	
District	Yes	No	Yes	No
6–1 (outside village)	1,283	2,319	690	2,528
6–3 (outside village)	365	822	690	2,528
6–2 (within village)	2,728	1,026	2,009	362
Townwide totals	4,376	4,167	2,699	2,890
Village vote to accept			No revote required, result was uncontested.	
	2,922	1,085	No revote required, result was uncontested.	

The town was incorporated on June 7, 1763, named after the Earl of Essex.

The Village of Essex Junction was formed within the town of Essex on November 15, 1892. The village was formed to provide additional services (such as sidewalks, water, and sewers) to its residents. The rural areas of the town did not want the services or the needed taxes.

As the town outside the village developed, it gradually added its own similar services, and by 1958, merger proposals appeared via voter petition. Over the years, various votes (often contentious) regarding a merger occurred in the village and the town, but never passing in both communities. - a requirement by the state legislature for a merger.

On November 7, 2006, a merger passed in both the town (as a whole) and village. The town as a whole (including the village) voted once on the merger, while the village, separately, voted in a second ballot to accept the merger if it passed the townwide vote. Complicating the matter, the regional paper misreported the merger failed based solely on results outside the village. The next day the correct results were reported in both the town's paper, and as a correction in the regional paper.

On December 6, 2006, a petition to reconsider the merger was submitted to the town. The petition contained signatures totaling more than 5 percent of registered voters, the threshold required for a re-vote. The re-vote was held on January 23, 2007. Those results overturned the merger by 191 votes, rejecting the current merger proposal.

An approval result would have triggered a multi-year merger process creating a new "Town of Essex Junction" and replacing the current governments of the town of Essex and the village of Essex Junction.

On November 2, 2021, voters in the village of Essex Junction voted to separate from the town of Essex, citing an unfair tax burden. The vote was 3,070 to 411 in favor of separation. Essex Junction separated on July 1, 2022.

== Geography ==
Essex is located in central Chittenden County, bordered on the south by the Winooski River. Neighboring municipalities are Colchester to the west, Milton at the northwest corner, Westford to the north, Underhill at the northeast corner, Jericho to the east, Williston to the south, and the cities of South Burlington and Essex Junction to the southwest.

According to the United States Census Bureau, the town of Essex in 2010 had a total area of 39.3 square miles (101.8 km^{2}), of which 38.8 square miles (100.6 km^{2}) was land and 0.50 square miles (1.3 km^{2}), or 1.26%, was water.

The 575 acre Indian Brook Town Conservation Area and 335 acre Saxon Hill Town Forest are located within the town.

== Demographics ==
Historical population
Census	Pop.	Note	%±
1790	354		—
1800	729		105.9%
1810	957		31.3%
1820	1,089		13.8%
1830	1,664		52.8%
1840	1,824		9.6%
1850	2,052		12.5%
1860	1,906		−7.1%
1870	2,022		6.1%
1880	2,104		4.1%
1890	2,013		−4.3%
1900	2,203		9.4%
1910	2,714		23.2%
1920	2,449		−9.8%
1930	2,876		17.4%
1940	3,059		6.4%
1950	3,931		28.5%
1960	7,090		80.4%
1970	10,951		54.5%
1980	14,392		31.4%
1990	16,498		14.6%
2000	18,626		12.9%
2010	19,587		5.2%
2020	22,094		12.8%
U.S. Decennial Census

=== 2010 census ===
As of the census of 2010, there were 19,587 people and 7,322 households in the town. The racial makeup of the town was 91.6% non-Hispanic White, 1.5% Black or African American, 3.2% Asian, 0.3% Native American, 0.1% other races, and 1.8% from two or more races. Hispanic or Latino of any race made up 1.7% of the population. The population density was 534 people per square mile (184.4/km^{2}). There were 7,170 housing units at an average density of 183.8 per square mile (71.0/km^{2}). There were 7,013 households, out of which 38.5% had children under the age of 18 living with them, 59.7% were married couples living together, 8.8% had a female householder with no husband present, and 28.5% were non-families. 21.7% of all households were made up of individuals, and 5.5% had someone living alone who was 65 years of age or older. The average household size was 2.62 and the average family size was 3.09.

In the town, the age distribution of the population shows 27.9% under the age of 18, 6.8% from 18 to 24, 32.5% from 25 to 44, 24.6% from 45 to 64, and 8.2% who were 65 years of age or older. The median age was 36 years. For every 100 females, there were 97.4 males. For every 100 females age 18 and over, there were 94.8 males.

The median income for a household in the town was $58,441, and the median income for a family was $65,794. Males had a median income of $45,428 versus $27,426 for females. The per capita income for the town was $25,854. About 1.8% of families and 2.6% of the population were below the poverty line, including 2.4% of those under age 18 and 6.6% of those age 65 or over.

== Arts and culture ==
=== Museums and other points of interest ===
The Harriet Farnsworth Powell Museum is located in Essex. The museum is housed in a former two-room schoolhouse, and includes a collection of costumes, school items, and local memorabilia.

== Government ==
Until 2022, Essex comprised three Vermont Legislature districts (seats) within Chittenden County: District 8–1, the central portion of the town of Essex; District 8–2, the former village of Essex Junction; and District 8–3, northern town of Essex and the town of Westford. The town of Essex and the city of Essex Junction continued to share municipal services until July 1, 2023.

=== Education ===
The Essex Westford School District (EWSD)—unified on July 1, 2017—serves 4,500 Pre-K to grade 12 students in Essex, Essex Junction, and Westford, Vermont. EWSD operates ten schools in the two towns—Albert D. Lawton Intermediate School, Essex Center for Technology, Essex Elementary School, Essex High School (EHS), Essex Middle School, Founders Memorial School, Hiawatha Elementary School, Summit Street School, Thomas Fleming School, and Westford School. Previously, the three communities had separate Pre-K to grade 8 school districts that fed the already unified EHS.

EWSD provides busing for students in Essex and Westford, as well as students in Essex Junction, who did not have buses prior to 2018. EWSD also provides busing to students from South Hero, Grand Isle, North Hero and Georgia who choose to attend EHS.

== Media ==
The Essex Reporter is a weekly newspaper published in town, covering news in Essex and the surrounding communities in Chittenden County. It has a weekly circulation of 8,800 copies.

== Infrastructure ==
=== Transportation ===
Vermont's Circumferential Highway (Vermont Route 289 or "The Circ") courses through Essex, and the section within Essex's jurisdiction has been completed. However, further construction of the highway was halted in surrounding communities by court action from environmental protesters.

Bus service is provided by Green Mountain Transit.

=== Rail ===
Amtrak, the national rail passenger system, provides daily service via its station in neighboring Essex Junction, operating the Vermonter train between St. Albans, Vermont and Washington, D.C. In 2008, a study indicated that the cheapest method for one person to get to New York City from the Burlington area was by train, at $48. It was also the longest, taking an estimated 9 hours and 25 minutes.

== Notable people ==
- Bert Abbey (1869–1962), pitcher with three teams
- William B. Castle, mayor of Cleveland, Ohio
- Linda K. Myers, member of the Vermont House of Representatives

== See also ==
- Essex Junction, Vermont
