= Essex Junction, Vermont =

- City
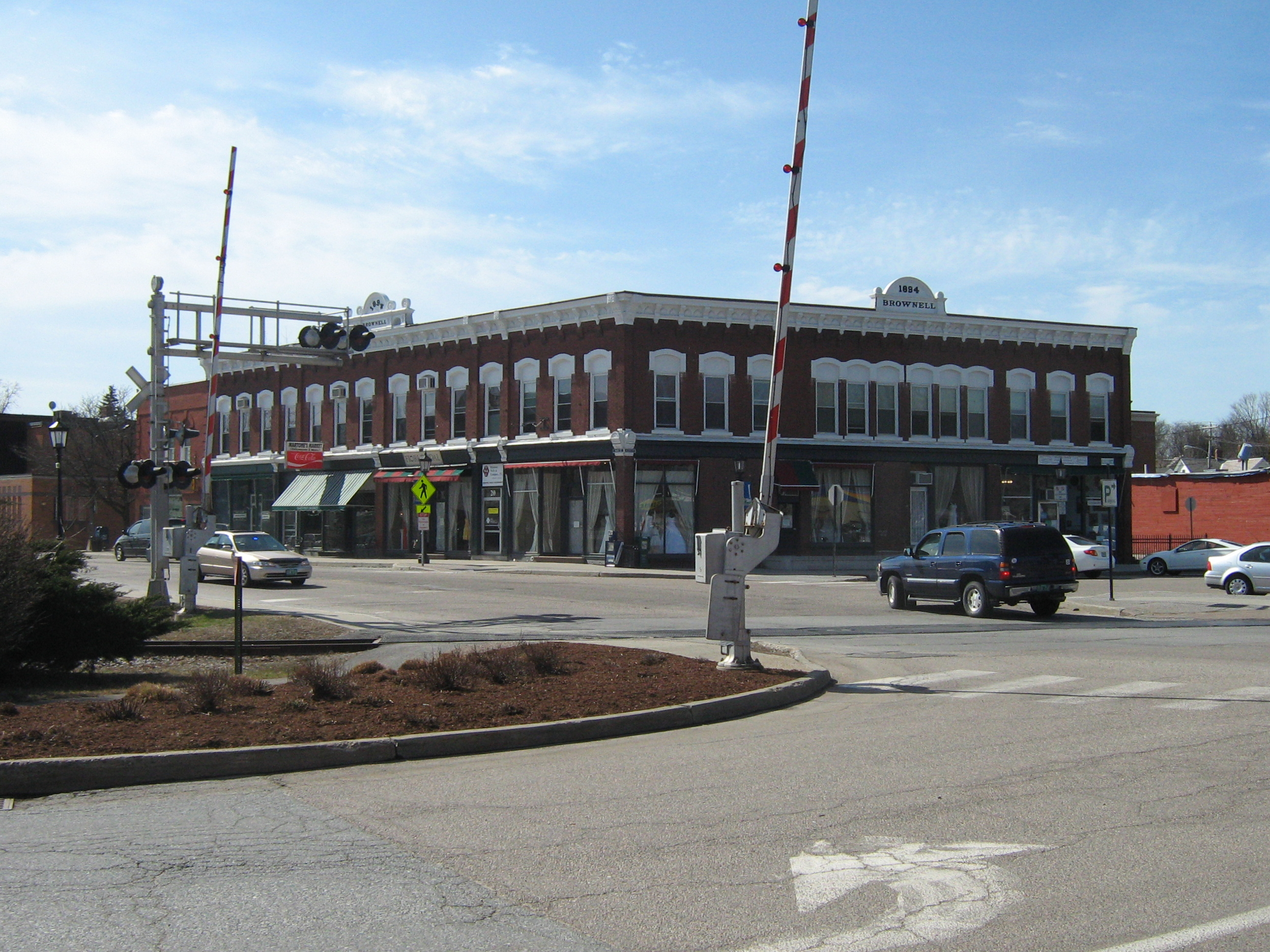
- Downtown Essex Junction

- Logo

- Location in Chittenden County and the state of Vermont.
- Coordinates: 44°29′35″N 73°08′41″W
- Country: United States
- State: Vermont
- County: Chittenden
- Incorporated (village): 1892
- Incorporated (city): 2022

Area
  - Total: 4.74 sq mi (12.28 km^{2})
  - Land: 4.56 sq mi (11.82 km^{2})
  - Water: 0.18 sq mi (0.46 km^{2})
- Elevation: 361 ft (110 m)

Population (2020)
  - Total: 10,590
  - Density: 2,320/sq mi (895.9/km^{2})
- Time zone: UTC-5 (Eastern (EST))
  - Summer (DST): UTC-4 (EDT)
- ZIP codes: 05451-05453
- Area code: 802
- FIPS code: 50-24400
- GNIS feature ID: 2378306
- Website: www.essexjunction.org

Essex Junction is a city in Chittenden County, Vermont, United States. As of the 2020 U.S. census, the population was 10,590. It was incorporated as a village on November 15, 1892. Essex Junction became Vermont's 10th city on July 1, 2022.

The city is part of the Essex Westford Unified Union School District which operates K–12 schools including Essex High School. The city is surrounded on three sides by the Town of Essex ("Essex Town").

Essex Junction is home to GlobalFoundries' Burlington Design Center and 200 mm wafer fabrication plant. GlobalFoundries is the largest private employer in the state of Vermont, with approximately 3,000 employees.

== History ==
In 1958, IBM opened a 40,000 square feet (3,700 m^{2}) data processing facility in Essex Junction, employing 500. In 1969, the plant (now owned by GlobalFoundries) expanded to 820,000 square feet (7.6 ha). In 1982, employment reached an all-time high of 8,000. In 2007, the value of the plant was $104 million. The plant's workforce was slightly over 5,000 in 2011, and in 2015, GlobalFoundries employed about 3,000 employees.

In 2003, as a result of the nationally publicized suicide of an Essex Junction teenager, Vermont and other states passed legislation against cyberbullying.

On November 2, 2021, voters in the village of Essex Junction voted overwhelmingly to separate from the town of Essex, citing an unfair tax burden. The vote was 3,070–411 in favor of separation.

== Geography ==
Essex Junction is located southwest of Essex and is bordered on the south by the Winooski River. The city is 6 miles (10 km) east of downtown Burlington via Vermont Route 15. According to the United States Census Bureau, the city has a total area of 4.7 square miles (12.3 km^{2}), of which 4.6 square miles (11.8 km^{2}) is land and 0.2 square miles (0.5 km^{2}), or 3.72%, is water.

=== Climate ===
This climatic region is typified by large seasonal temperature differences, with warm to hot summers and cold winters. According to the Köppen Climate Classification system, Essex Junction has a humid continental climate, abbreviated "Dfb" on climate maps.

Climate data for Essex Junction, Vermont, 1991–2020 normals, extremes 1971–2014
Month	Jan	Feb	Mar	Apr	May	Jun	Jul	Aug	Sep	Oct	Nov	Dec	Year
Record high °F (°C)	66 (19)	60 (16)	82 (28)	91 (33)	93 (34)	98 (37)	100 (38)	98 (37)	97 (36)	82 (28)	74 (23)	64 (18)	100 (38)
Mean maximum °F (°C)	50.5 (10.3)	50.6 (10.3)	63.8 (17.7)	78.2 (25.7)	85.4 (29.7)	90.6 (32.6)	91.4 (33.0)	90.3 (32.4)	85.4 (29.7)	75.2 (24.0)	66.5 (19.2)	52.0 (11.1)	93.3 (34.1)
Mean daily maximum °F (°C)	28.4 (−2.0)	31.4 (−0.3)	40.3 (4.6)	54.4 (12.4)	68.2 (20.1)	76.9 (24.9)	81.3 (27.4)	79.9 (26.6)	72.1 (22.3)	58.2 (14.6)	46.1 (7.8)	34.6 (1.4)	56.0 (13.3)
Daily mean °F (°C)	19.1 (−7.2)	21.4 (−5.9)	30.8 (−0.7)	44.6 (7.0)	57.4 (14.1)	66.5 (19.2)	71.0 (21.7)	69.6 (20.9)	62.0 (16.7)	49.2 (9.6)	38.3 (3.5)	26.9 (−2.8)	46.4 (8.0)
Mean daily minimum °F (°C)	9.9 (−12.3)	11.4 (−11.4)	21.4 (−5.9)	34.7 (1.5)	46.7 (8.2)	56.1 (13.4)	60.8 (16.0)	59.2 (15.1)	51.8 (11.0)	40.2 (4.6)	30.6 (−0.8)	19.1 (−7.2)	36.8 (2.7)
Mean minimum °F (°C)	−17.2 (−27.3)	−13.8 (−25.4)	−5.7 (−20.9)	18.2 (−7.7)	28.8 (−1.8)	38.5 (3.6)	46.7 (8.2)	42.6 (5.9)	33.3 (0.7)	23.9 (−4.5)	11.3 (−11.5)	−6.5 (−21.4)	−20.4 (−29.1)
Record low °F (°C)	−31 (−35)	−35 (−37)	−23 (−31)	2 (−17)	25 (−4)	30 (−1)	39 (4)	36 (2)	27 (−3)	19 (−7)	−3 (−19)	−26 (−32)	−35 (−37)
Average precipitation inches (mm)	2.49 (63)	2.11 (54)	2.70 (69)	3.49 (89)	3.96 (101)	4.64 (118)	4.51 (115)	4.00 (102)	3.98 (101)	4.44 (113)	3.02 (77)	2.97 (75)	42.31 (1,075)
Average snowfall inches (cm)	20.4 (52)	19.2 (49)	16.5 (42)	4.4 (11)	0.0 (0.0)	0.0 (0.0)	0.0 (0.0)	0.0 (0.0)	0.0 (0.0)	0.3 (0.76)	5.8 (15)	19.3 (49)	85.9 (218)
Average precipitation days (≥ 0.01 in)	15.5	12.1	12.5	13.3	15.0	14.5	14.6	12.7	12.3	14.1	13.3	16.0	165.9
Average snowy days (≥ 0.1 in)	12.9	10.4	7.5	2.0	0.0	0.0	0.0	0.0	0.0	0.3	3.8	10.7	47.6
Source 1: NOAA
Source 2: National Weather Service (mean maxima/minima 1981–2010)

== Demographics ==
Historical population
Census	Pop.	Note	%±
1900	1,141		—
1910	1,245		9.1%
1920	1,410		13.3%
1930	1,621		15.0%
1940	1,901		17.3%
1950	2,741		44.2%
1960	5,340		94.8%
1970	6,511		21.9%
1980	7,033		8.0%
1990	8,396		19.4%
2000	8,591		2.3%
2010	9,271		7.9%
2020	10,590		14.2%
U.S. Decennial Census

As of the census of 2000, there were 8,591 people, 3,409 households, and 2,253 families residing in the city. The population density was 1,804.1 people per square mile (696.8/km^{2}). There were 3,501 housing units at an average density of 735.2/sq mi (284.0/km^{2}). There were 3,409 households, out of which 35.1% had children under the age of 18 living with them, 53.4% were married couples living together, 9.8% had a female householder with no husband present, and 33.9% were non-families. 26.4% of all households were made up of individuals, and 7.4% had someone living alone who was 65 years of age or older. The average household size was 2.48 and the average family size was 3.04.

In the city, the population was spread out, with 26.4% under the age of 18, 7.7% from 18 to 24, 32.9% from 25 to 44, 23.1% from 45 to 64, and 10.0% who were 65 years of age or older. The median age was 36 years. For every 100 females, there were 97.6 males. For every 100 females age 18 and over, there were 96.0 males.

The median income for a household in the city was $53,444, and the median income for a family was $61,985. Males had a median income of $40,287 versus $26,910 for females. The per capita income for the city was $24,142. About 1.8% of families and 2.9% of the population were below the poverty line, including 2.6% of those under age 18 and 7.8% of those age 65 or over.

== Economy ==
The largest industrial facility in Vermont is GlobalFoundries' semiconductor plant in Essex Junction. In 2007, the then-IBM plant had the largest assessment in the town, $104 million.

== Arts and culture ==
The Champlain Valley Exposition is a former dirt racetrack that has been re-purposed as an event field, with stadium seating for concerts and indoor events.

The 10-day Champlain Valley Fair is the state's largest fair, and features agricultural exhibits and events, vendors, a carnival, and entertainment. Attendance has reached almost 300,000 per year, and 2010, the fair had 46 carnival rides and almost 200 vendors.

== Education ==
The Essex Westford School District was consolidated in 2017. The district includes and funds schools in Essex Junction, Essex Town, and Westford. Schools in Essex Junction include:

- Hiawatha School (Grades K–3)
- Thomas Fleming School (Grades 4–5)
- Albert D. Lawton School (Grades 6–9)
- Essex High School
- Center for Technology Essex

== Infrastructure ==
=== Transportation ===
Amtrak, the national passenger rail system, provides daily service via its station in Essex Junction, one of two rail stations in Chittenden County. The Vermonter train runs daily from St. Albans in northern Vermont to Washington Union Station in Washington, D.C.; passing through Essex Junction. It was formerly called the Montrealer; its terminus being at Central Station in Montreal, Quebec, Canada. Essex Junction was the nearest Amtrak station to Burlington until the Ethan Allen Express was extended to serve Burlington directly on July 29, 2022.

== Notable people ==
- Guy W. Bailey, Secretary of State of Vermont and University of Vermont president
- Season Hubley, actress
- Dewey H. Perry, U.S. Marshal for Vermont
- Loung Ung, author
- Brian Wood, comic book author and screenwriter
