= Winooski River =

River in Vermont, United States

Coordinates: 44°31′49″N 73°16′28″W

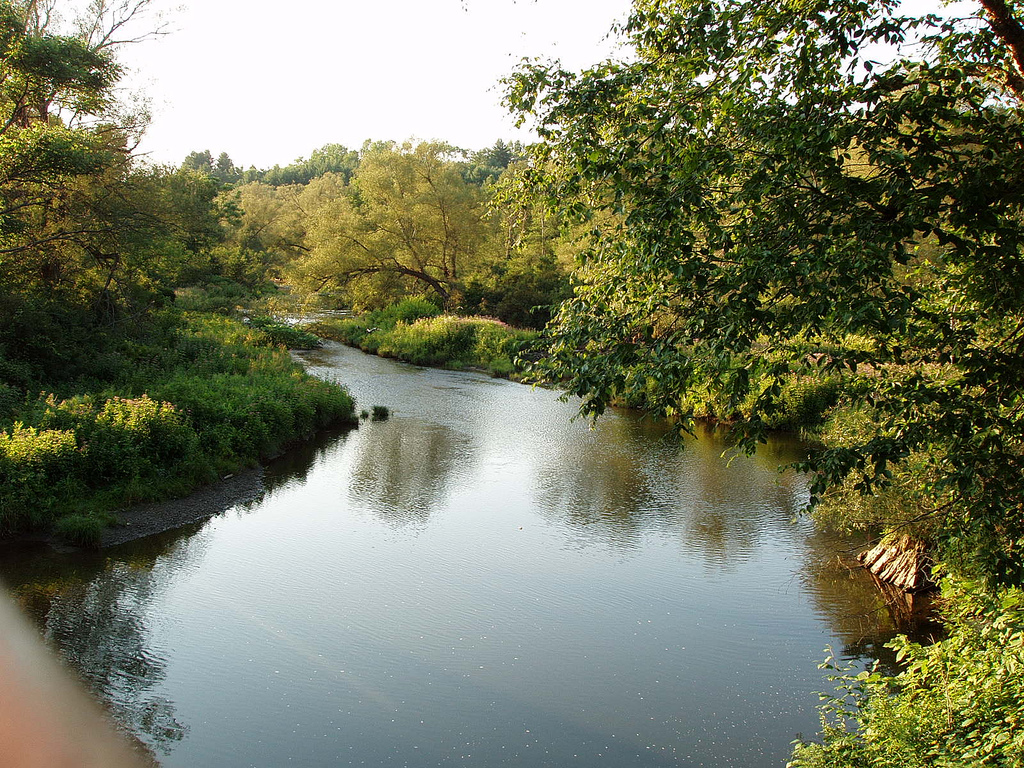
The North Branch of the Winooski River at Montpelier

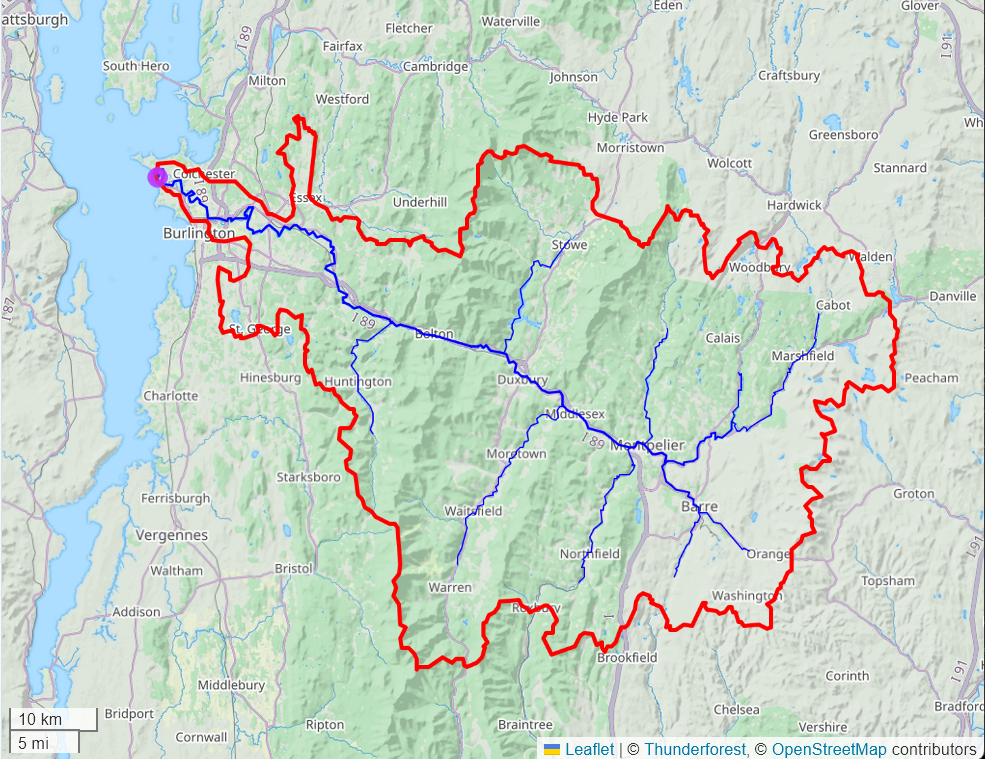
Map of the Winooski River watershed

The Winooski River (also known as the Onion River) is a tributary of Lake Champlain, about 90 miles (145 km) long, in the northern half of Vermont. Although not Vermont's longest river, it is one of the state's most significant, forming a major valley way from Lake Champlain through the Green Mountains towards (although not connecting in drainage to) the Connecticut River Valley.

The river drains an area of the northern Green Mountains between Vermont's capital of Montpelier and its largest city, Burlington. It rises in the town of Cabot in Washington County, and then flows southwest to Montpelier, passing through the city along the south side of downtown and the Vermont State House. From Montpelier, it flows northwest into Chittenden County through Richmond, passing north of the city of Burlington. It enters the eastern side of Lake Champlain around 5 miles (8 km) northwest of downtown Burlington. The city of Winooski sits along the river roughly 8 miles (13 km) upstream from its mouth, on the northeastern edge of Burlington. The river was historically used for the transportation of timber in the logging heyday of Vermont during the 19th century. The valley of the river downstream from Montpelier is where both U.S. Highway 2 and Interstate 89 run between Montpelier and Burlington.

The river is one of several antecedent rivers in Vermont which antedate the rise of the ancient Green Mountains, and have cut through these mountains as they rose and eroded.

== Tributaries ==
The Winooski is fed by several tributary rivers - the Little River, the North Branch, and the Kingsbury Branch are right-bank tributaries, entering from the north, while the Huntington River, Mad River, Dog River, and Stevens Branch are left-bank tributaries which enter from the south. The Lower Tributaries, smaller tributary streams nearer the mouth of the Winooski, include Allen Brook, Alder Brook, Gleason Brook, Mill Brook, and Muddy Brook.

== History ==
The name "Winooski" comes from the Abenaki word winoskik meaning "at wild onion land", a reference to the leeks or wild onions that were once common along the river banks. The byname "Onion River" came into general usage in the late 18th and early 19th centuries, after Ira and Ethan Allen established the Onion River Land Company.

In the late winter of 1992, ice blockages in the Winooski caused a major flood in Montpelier, resulting in extensive damage to much of the downtown, the worst flood in Montpelier since the larger Great Flood of 1927.

In July 2023, heavy rains caused flooding throughout the Winooski River Valley, damaging homes and businesses. Water levels reached levels higher than those recorded during 2011's Hurricane Irene, but not as high as the Great Flood of 1927.

== Uses ==
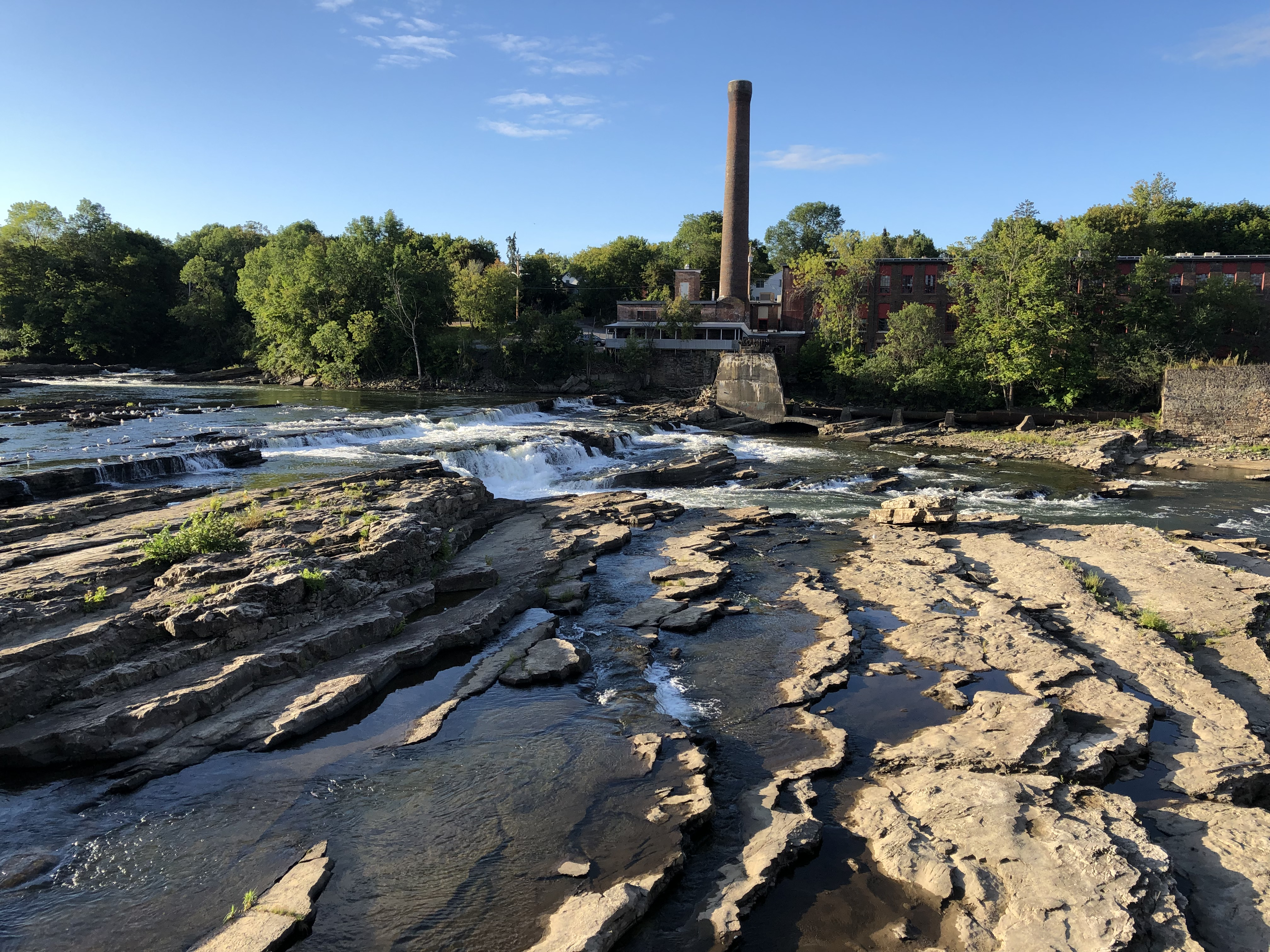
Falls on the Winooski River between the cities of Winooski (foreground) and Burlington (far shore)

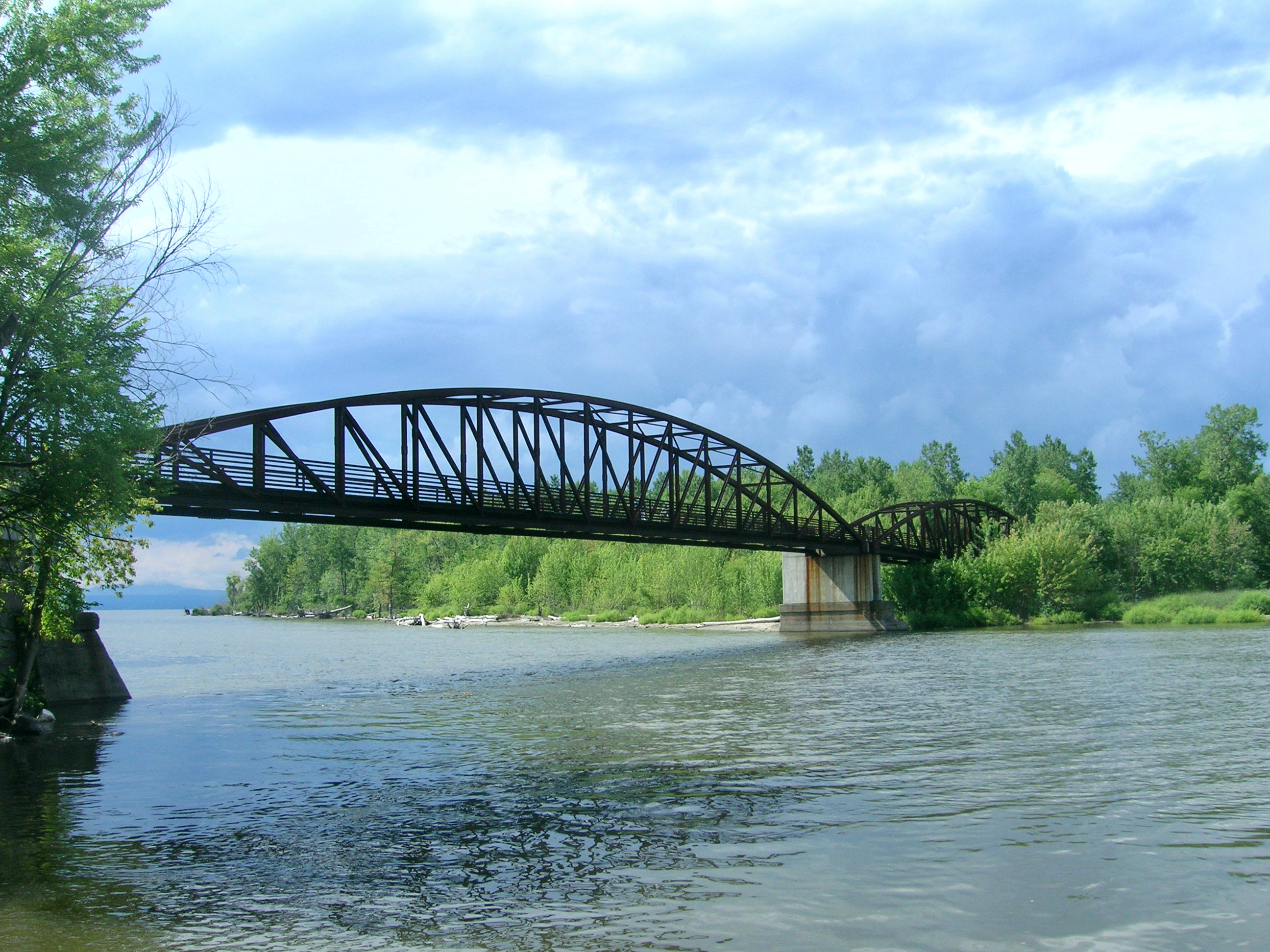
Northwesterly view of the Winooski River Bicycle and Pedestrian Bridge crossing from Burlington to Colchester along the Island Line Trail at the mouth of the Winooski River

The river is used for a variety of purposes. It is popular for recreational uses such as canoeing, kayaking, fishing, and swimming. In addition to providing habitats for the native brook trout, the Winooski and its tributaries also support naturalized populations of wild rainbow trout and brown trout. Smallmouth bass and walleye are found in the lower reaches of the river, and migratory populations of largemouth bass and northern pike often enter the Winooski from Lake Champlain in the spring.

As of December 2018, 14 hydroelectric dams were along the Winooski River and its tributaries. Four of these facilities are licensed with the Federal Energy Regulatory Commission. The Winooski One Dam, located on the river in the city of Winooski, was the first high-performance civil structure in the world imbedded with fiber-optic sensors when it was built in 1992. For this reason, the dam was listed in the Guinness Book of World Records as the "world's most intelligent dam".

== See also ==
- List of rivers of Vermont
