= List of bus operators in Vermont =

This is a list of bus operators in Vermont.

Operator	Hubs	County	Notes	
Advance Transit (AT)	Hartford	Windsor County		
Advance Transit (AT)	Norwich	Windsor County		
Green Mountain Community Network (GMCN)	Bennington	Bennington County		
Green Mountain Transit (GMT)	Burlington	Chittenden County	Formed by merger of Green Mountain Transit Authority and Chittenden County Transportation Authority	
Green Mountain Transit (GMT)	St. Albans	Franklin County	Formed by merger of Green Mountain Transit Authority and Chittenden County Transportation Authority	
Green Mountain Transit (GMT)	Alburgh	Grand Isle County	Formed by merger of Green Mountain Transit Authority and Chittenden County Transportation Authority	
Green Mountain Transit (GMT)	Stowe	Lamoille County	Formed by merger of Green Mountain Transit Authority and Chittenden County Transportation Authority	
Green Mountain Transit (GMT)	Montpelier	Washington County	Formed by merger of Green Mountain Transit Authority and Chittenden County Transportation Authority	
Marble Valley Regional Transit District (MVRTD) (The Bus)	Rutland	Rutland County		
Rural Community Transportation (RCT)	St. Johnsbury	Caledonia County		
Rural Community Transportation (RCT)	Morristown	Lamoille County		
Rural Community Transportation (RCT)	Derby	Orleans County		
Rural Community Transportation (RCT)	Montpelier	Washington County		
Rural Community Transportation (RCT)	Southeast Vermont Transit (SEVT) (MOOver)	Brattleboro	Windham County	Formed by merger of Deerfield Valley Transit Association and Connecticut River Transit
Dover	Southeast Vermont Transit (SEVT) (MOOver)		Windham County	Formed by merger of Deerfield Valley Transit Association and Connecticut River Transit
Rockingham	Southeast Vermont Transit (SEVT) (MOOver)		Windham County	Formed by merger of Deerfield Valley Transit Association and Connecticut River Transit
Bennington	Southeast Vermont Transit (SEVT) (MOOver)	Bennington County		Formed by merger of Deerfield Valley Transit Association and Connecticut River Transit
Hartford	Southeast Vermont Transit (SEVT) (MOOver)	Windsor County		Formed by merger of Deerfield Valley Transit Association and Connecticut River Transit
Springfield	Southeast Vermont Transit (SEVT) (MOOver)	Windsor County		Formed by merger of Deerfield Valley Transit Association and Connecticut River Transit
Special Services Transportation Agency (SSTA)	Colchester	Chittenden County	Private not-for-profit paratransit provider	
Tri-Valley Transit (TVT)	Bristol	Addison County	Formed by merger of Addison County Transit Resources and Stagecoach Transportation Services	
Tri-Valley Transit (TVT)	Middlebury	Addison County	Formed by merger of Addison County Transit Resources and Stagecoach Transportation Services	
Tri-Valley Transit (TVT)	Vergennes	Addison County	Formed by merger of Addison County Transit Resources and Stagecoach Transportation Services	
Tri-Valley Transit (TVT)	Hartford	Windsor County	Formed by merger of Addison County Transit Resources and Stagecoach Transportation Services	
Tri-Valley Transit (TVT)	Norwich	Windsor County	Formed by merger of Addison County Transit Resources and Stagecoach Transportation Services	
Tri-Valley Transit (TVT)	Randolph	Orange County	Formed by merger of Addison County Transit Resources and Stagecoach Transportation Services	
Campus Area Transportation System (CATS)	Burlington	Chittenden County	University of Vermont bus network	
