= Vermont Translines =

American intercity bus service

- Parent: Premier Coach
- Founded: 2013
- Headquarters: Milton, Vermont
- Service area: Vermont and fringes of New York and New Hampshire
- Service type: intercity bus service
- Alliance: Greyhound (since inception), Amtrak (as of August 2017)
- Routes: 3
- Destinations: Burlington, Vermont, Rutland, Albany, New York and Lebanon, New Hampshire, Manchester, Vermont on the Vermont Shires Connector
- Website: vttranslines.com

Vermont Translines is an intercity bus company founded by its parent company, charter bus company Premier Coach, in 2013. The bus company mainly serves the US Route 7 and US Route 4 corridors in the New England state of Vermont. Aided by $400,000 in annual federal grant money disbursed by the Vermont Agency of Transportation, the company also utilizes Greyhound's ticketing system and connects with other Greyhound bus routes, primarily in Burlington, Albany and White River Junction. Service on two routes between Burlington, Vermont and Albany, New York and between Rutland, Vermont and Dartmouth-Hitchcock Medical Center in Lebanon, New Hampshire officially began June 9, 2014, with intermediate stops at towns and cities between. The restart of intercity bus service for places like Rutland marked the first time some places along the current routes had seen any intercity bus service at all since Greyhound left Rutland in 2008, and in towns like Bennington since 2005.

In August 2017, an Amtrak Thruway bus service known as the Vermont Shires Connector commenced, with service between the Albany–Rensselaer Amtrak train station and Manchester, also stopping in Bennington in two places along the way. The route was terminated on July 19, 2021 when Vermont Translines resumed service following the COVID-19 pandemic. However, the Burlington-Albany route is also designated as an Amtrak Thruway service with a stop at Albany–Rensselaer, supplementing Amtrak's Ethan Allen Express service to Burlington.

All three routes run 365 days a year with one run in each direction per day. Trip planning for all routes are also available on Google Maps as of January 19, 2015.

== Fleet ==
Vermont Translines' current bus fleet consists of German bus manufacturer Setra coaches numbered 285, 286 and 287, and a Dodge bus numbered 1001. The much smaller Dodge bus is primarily used on the Route 4 bus route largely due to lower ridership on that route in the first fiscal year of the company's operation. The buses have Wi-Fi connections, and the three Setra buses have power outlet connections for portable electronic devices and restrooms available.

== Livery and identity ==
The company's buses have a mainly white color scheme, in conjunction with a combination of black, gold and green paint. Premier Coach's logo also appears in green on the back of the vehicles, as does Vermont Translines' website address. Drivers dress primarily in green and black uniforms.

== Route detail ==
=== Burlington to Albany route ===
State/Province	Town/City	Station	Connections
Vermont	Colchester	Colchester, VT Park and Ride, I-89 Exit 17	GMT: 96
Vermont	Burlington	Downtown Transit Center	GMT: 1, 2, 3, 5, 6, 7, 8, 9, 11, 86, 96; ACTR: 116 Commuter to Middlebury; Megabus to Boston and New York City; Greyhound to Boston and Montreal
Vermont	South Burlington	Burlington International Airport	GMT: 1 Greyhound to Boston and Montreal
Vermont	Vergennes	US 7 and VT 22A Park and Ride lot	ACTR: Burlington LINK
Vermont	Middlebury	Academy Street near Middlebury College	MVRTD "The Bus" (partnership with ACTR): Rutland-Middlebury Connector; ACTR: Middlebury Shuttle, Tri-Town Shuttle, Snow Bowl Shuttle, 116 Commuter, Burlington LINK
Vermont	Brandon	Union St. side of the Green	MVRTD "The Bus" and ACTR: Rutland-Middlebury Connector
Vermont	Rutland	Marble Valley Regional Transit Center	Vermont Translines to White River Junction and Lebanon, New Hampshire; MVRTD "The Bus": North, South, South Extension, West, Hospital, Diamond Express (toward Killington Ski Resort), Fair Haven Connector, Middlebury Connector (in a partnership with ACTR), Manchester Connector, Proctor Connector, Ludlow Connector (connection with SEVT "the Current" 57 bus at Okemo base lodge continuing to Bellows Falls)
Vermont	Wallingford	Cumberland Farms	MVRTD "The Bus": Manchester Connector
Vermont	Manchester	Zoey's Double Hex Restaurant	
Vermont	Bennington	GMCN Bus Terminal	Yankee Trails: Bennington-Albany Shuttle; Vermont Translines: Vermont Shires Connector to Albany, NY and Manchester; Green Mountain Express: Red, Blue, Brown, Green, Light Green, Emerald (eastbound to Wilmington weekday evenings), Orange (northbound to Manchester), Purple (southbound to Williamstown, Massachusetts); SEVT "the MOOver": 13 (connection with bus route 10 in Wilmington weekday mornings continuing to Brattleboro)
New York	Latham	Albany International Airport	CDTA: 117, 155, 737 Adirondack Trailways to Montreal, Albany and New York City
New York	Albany	Greyhound Bus Terminal	Greyhound, Peter Pan Lines, Adirondack Trailways, Short Line Coach to New York City, Boston, Springfield, Montreal, Buffalo and Binghamton; CDTA: All routes serving downtown Albany

=== Rutland to Lebanon route (discontinued) ===
State/Province	Town/City	Station	Connections
Vermont	Rutland	Marble Valley Regional Transit Center	Vermont Translines to Albany and Burlington; MVRTD "The Bus": North, South, South Extension, West, Hospital, Diamond Express (toward Killington Ski Resort), Fair Haven Connector, Middlebury Connector (in a partnership with ACTR), Manchester Connector, Proctor Connector, Ludlow Connector (connection with SEVT "the Current" 57 bus at Okemo base lodge continuing to Bellows Falls)
Vermont	Mendon	Town Offices/Park & Ride	MVRTD "The Bus": Diamond Express
Vermont	Sherburne Pass	Long Trail Crossing	MVRTD "The Bus": Diamond Express
Vermont	Killington	Chamber of Commerce, 2319 US 4	MVRTD "The Bus": Diamond Express
Vermont	Bridgewater	Olsen's Bridgewater Country Store	
Vermont	Woodstock	Town Lot, South End of Maxham Meadow Way	
Vermont	Quechee	Jiffy Mart, 6800 Woodstock Road	
Vermont	White River Jct	Greyhound Bus Terminal	Greyhound to Montreal, Boston and New York City; Advance Transit: Orange; SEVT "the Current": 74
New Hampshire	Hanover	Hanover Inn	Greyhound to Boston and Montreal; Dartmouth Coach to Boston and New York City; Advance Transit: Brown, Green, Orange, Dartmouth Shuttle; Stagecoach Transportation Services: 89er Commuter; SEVT "the Current": 73, 74
New Hampshire	Lebanon	Dartmouth-Hitchcock Medical Center	Advance Transit: Blue, DHMC Parking Lot Shuttles; Stagecoach Transportation Services: 89er Commuter, River Route; SEVT "the Current": 71, 72

=== Vermont Shires Connector (discontinued) ===
State/Province	Town/City	Station	Connections
Vermont	Manchester	Bus Parking Lot	
Vermont	Manchester	Curb Cut, Hampton Inn	Green Mountain Express: Orange; MVRTD "The Bus": Manchester-Rutland Connector
Vermont	Manchester	Equinox Hotel	Green Mountain Express: Orange; MVRTD "The Bus": Manchester-Rutland Connector
Vermont	Bennington	GMCN Bus Terminal	Yankee Trails: Bennington-Albany Shuttle; Vermont Translines to Albany, Rutland and Burlington; Green Mountain Express: Red, Blue, Brown, Green, Light Green, Emerald (eastbound to Wilmington weekday evenings), Orange (northbound to Manchester), Purple (southbound to Williamstown, Massachusetts); SEVT "the MOOver": 13 (connection with bus route 10 in Wilmington weekday mornings continuing to Brattleboro)
Vermont	Bennington	Hampton Inn	Green Mountain Express: Brown
New York
New York	Rensselaer	Albany-Rensselaer	Amtrak: Adirondack, Ethan Allen Express, Empire Service, Lake Shore Limited, Maple Leaf; CDTA: 214, 24; Megabus: M27 to Ridgewood, New Jersey and New York City
New York	Albany	Greyhound Bus Terminal	Greyhound, Peter Pan Lines, Adirondack Trailways, Short Line Coach to New York City, Boston, Springfield, Montreal, Buffalo and Binghamton; CDTA: All routes serving downtown Albany
New York	Latham	Albany International Airport	CDTA: 117, 155, 737 Adirondack Trailways to Montreal, Albany and New York City

== See also ==
- Intercity buses in the United States
