= Green Mountain Transit =

Public transit system in Vermont, US

Coordinates: 44°27′01″N 73°13′13″W

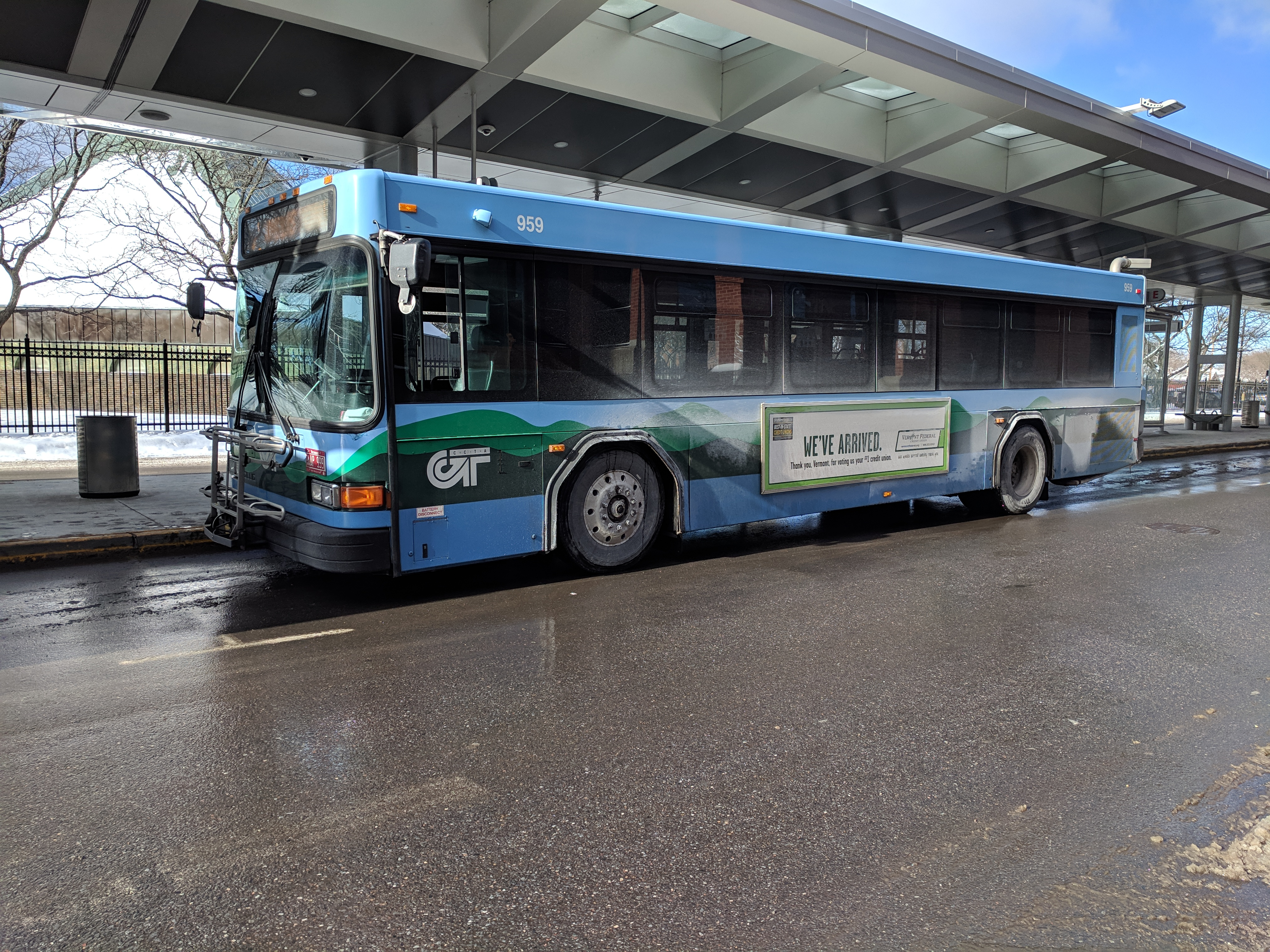
- Founded: 2016; 10 years ago (as CCTA, 1973; 53 years ago)
- Headquarters: 101 Queen City Park Road
- Locale: Burlington, Vermont
- Service area: Chittenden County; The Capital District; Stowe and Lamoille County; Mad River Valley
- Service type: Bus service commuter bus service paratransit
- Routes: 16
- Fleet: 143 buses
- Daily ridership: 7,300 (weekdays, Q2 2026)
- Annual ridership: 1,774,100 (2025)
- General Manager: Clayton Clark
- Website: ridegmt.com

Green Mountain Transit (GMT) is a regional public transit system based in Burlington, Vermont. GMT operates local and commuter bus services and paratransit, primarily in Chittenden County and Washington County. In 2025, the system had a ridership of 1,774,100, or about 7,300 per weekday as of the second quarter of 2026. It is the largest public transit agency in the state of Vermont.

== History ==
In 2011, Chittenden County Transportation Authority and Green Mountain Transit Authority merged into one organization. The system was formally rebranded as Green Mountain Transit in 2016. As of January 1, 2026, service in Franklin and Grand Isle Counties is being operated by Rural Community Transportation (RCT).

== Routes ==
=== Local routes ===
==== Chittenden County (NextGen) ====
In June 2019, pairs of local routes were combined, given color-coded route names and through-routed via the Downtown Transit Center (DTC) with new schedules; see "Former routes" below for more information. Most local routes operate seven days a week with 20-minute or 30-minute service patterns during weekdays. Saturday service operates within 30- to 60-minute headways and Sunday service operates within 45- to 90-minute headways.

Route	Terminals		Streets traveled	Notes
1 Williston	Burlington; Downtown Transit Center	Williston; Walmart	Main Street, Williston Road (South Burlington, Williston), Marshall Avenue	Daily service.; Serves University Mall and City Center on Market Street.
2 Essex Junction	Burlington; Downtown Transit Center	Essex Junction; Amtrak Station	Colchester Avenue, East Allen Street (Winooski), College Parkway (Colchester), Pearl Street (Essex Junction)	Daily service.; Some rush trips serve GlobalFoundries in Essex Junction.
4 Essex Center	Essex Junction; Amtrak Station	Essex Town; Sand Hill Road and River Road (See Notes)	Clockwise Loop: Main Street (Essex Junction), Essex Outlet Fair, Center Road, Sand Hill Road, River Road (Essex Center), Maple Street (Essex Junction)	Weekday peak service only, two a.m. trips and three p.m. trips.; Sand Hill Road/River Road is at about the 2/3 point in the loop.; Merged into the now-discontinued Route 10 on June 17, 2019, unmerged on June 16, 2025.
5 Pine Street	Burlington; Downtown Transit Center	Burlington; South End; Champlain Parkway and Home Avenue	Saint Paul Street, Pine Street	No Sunday service, see route 756 below.; No DTC-bound service after 7:00 PM. All evening South End buses terminate at the GMT Offices and may be signed as "TO GARAGE".
6 Shelburne Road	Burlington; Downtown Transit Center	Shelburne Museum	South Union Street, Shelburne Road	No Sunday service, see route 756 below.; Some Shelburne-bound rush trips extended to Vermont Teddy Bear Company.; No later evening service on Saturdays.
7 North Avenue	Burlington; Downtown Transit Center	Burlington; Northgate Apartments; Northgate Road and North Avenue	North Street, North Avenue	No Sunday service, see route 778 below.; No later evening service on Saturdays.; Heineburg Housing served by Northgate-bound buses hourly during daytime hours.
8 City Loop	Burlington; Downtown Transit Center	Clockwise Loop (See Notes)	North Avenue, North Street, Archibald Street, North Prospect Street, Maple Street, Battery Street	No Sunday service, see route 778 below.; No evening service.; As of June 16, 2025, all trips run every 60 minutes serving both Fern Hill and McAuley Square.; Pre-June 2008, known as "Old North End Loop" with bi-directional service.
9 Winooski	Burlington; Downtown Transit Center	Colchester; Water Tower Hill opposite Shaw’s	Elmwood Avenue, Riverside Avenue, Main Street (Winooski)	Travels via Champlain Mill between Burlington and Winooski.; No Sunday service.; No later evening service on Saturdays.; Alternate Winooski-bound buses serve 83 Barlow Street or the Courtyard.; Extension to Colchester with bi-directional service on Main Street started August 24, 2026.
11 City Connector	Burlington; Downtown Transit Center	South Burlington; City Center; Market Street	Main Street, then: Counter-clockwise Loop: Dorset Street, Kennedy Drive, Hinesburg Road, Market Street	No evening or Sunday service.; Route is no longer fare-free in Burlington as of August 25, 2025.; Market Street (City Center) terminal is located about 80% of the way through the loop.; Created originally from the former #11 (College Street Shuttle) and #12 (South Burlington Circulator) routes, and then the now-former recent #11 Airport route.
756 South End Circulator	Burlington; Downtown Transit Center	Burlington; Green Mountain Transit Offices; Queen City Park Road and Home Avenue	Counter-clockwise Loop: South Winooski Avenue, Pine Street, Shelburne Road, South Union Street, Main Street	New route as of June 16, 2025, combining routes 5 and 6, and resembling the southern half of retired route 18.; Sunday daytime service only.; No service on Shelburne Road south of Queen City Park Road/Swift Street.
778 North End Circulator	Burlington; Downtown Transit Center	Burlington; Northgate Apartments; Northgate Road and North Avenue	Clockwise Loop: North Avenue, DTC (on Pearl Street), North Union Street, North Prospect Street, Pearl Street	New route as of June 16, 2025, combining routes 7 and 8, and resembling the northern half of retired route 18.; Sunday daytime service only.; Travels from DTC-Pearl Street to the “main” DTC via Fern Hill and McAuley Square (City Loop).

==== Capital District ====
- 80 City Route Mid-day
- 81 Barre/Hospital Hill
- 82 Montpelier/Hospital Hill
- 87 Northfield Community Shuttle
- 90 Health Center in Plainfield Shuttle
- MyRide by GMT

==== Franklin/Grand Isle Counties ====
Now operated by RCT.

==== Lamoille County/Stowe/Mad River Valley (seasonal) ====
- 108 Mountain Road Shuttle
- 120 Valley Floor
- 122 Mount Ellen
- 124 Mountain Condos
- 125 Access Road

=== Commuter and express routes ===
Commuter and express routes operate weekday rush periods only unless otherwise noted and are limited stop.

==== Chittenden County ====
Route	Terminals		Serves	Notes
86 Montpelier LINK Express	Burlington; Downtown Transit Center	Montpelier; Main Street and State Street	Burlington, South Burlington, Williston, Richmond, Waterbury, Montpelier	Travels via I-89.; Additional midday service.; Reduced to seven weekday trips as of March 3, 2025.
96 Franklin County Commuter	Burlington; Downtown Transit Center	St. Albans; Park and Ride	Burlington, Winooski, Milton, Georgia, St. Albans	Travels via US 7 and I-89.; Additional midday service.; Absorbed part of route 56 effective August 25, 2025.; Service to Colchester ended Spring 2026.

==== Capital District ====
- 83 Waterbury Commuter
- 84 US 2 Commuter
- 86 Montpelier LINK Express (see table above)
- 89 City Commuter
- 93 Northfield Commuter

==== Franklin/Grand Isle Counties ====
Now operated by RCT.

=== Shopping specials ===
==== Chittenden County ====
These are shuttle buses that each operate one day per week, in the morning, to/from senior housing centers. The general public is welcome on these routes.

Route	Terminals		Serves	Notes
Hannaford Shopping Special	South Burlington; See "Serves"	University Mall; Hannaford	City Center, The Pines, Country Park	Tuesday service only.; Shown as route 16 on GMT’s online Remix map.
Market 32 Shopping Special	Winooski; See "Serves"	South Burlington; Market 32	The Courtyard, 83 Barlow Street, Spring Garden, Fern Hill*, McAuley Square* (*) denotes Burlington destinations	Wednesday service only.; Shown as route 20 on GMT’s online Remix map.
Market 32 Shopping Special	Burlington; See "Serves"	South Burlington; Market 32	10 North Champlain Street, 3 Cathedral Square, Decker Towers, Thayer Housing, McKenzie House, 101 College Street, 109 Maple Street	Thursday service only.; Shown as route 19 on GMT’s online Remix map.

==== Capital District ====
- 85 Hannaford Shopping Shuttle

=== Former routes ===
==== Chittenden County routes ====
On June 17, 2019, GMT converted all the previously-numbered routes to colored through-routed (via the DTC) services. A short time thereafter, due to passenger feedback, GMT added the route numbers back in with the color scheme. The Red Line was composed of the 7 and 1 routes, the Blue Line with the 6 and 2, the Green Line with the 5 and 9 and the Orange Line with the 10 (and the later addition of the 4, which was originally the Silver Loop after conversion). The 8 became the Gold Loop. On June 14, 2021, due to more customer feedback, the GMT eliminated the color designations in favor of the previous numerical ones.

Route	Terminals		Streets traveled or Areas served	Notes
1V Williston Village	Burlington; Downtown Transit Center	Williston Village; Williston Town Hall	Main Street, Williston Road (South Burlington, Williston), then: Clockwise Loop: Industrial Avenue, Mountain View Road, North Williston Road (see Notes)	Weekday rush periods only along with one mid-day trip.; AM trips clockwise loop through Williston Village, PM trips counter-clockwise.; Only serves University Mall AM/mid-day Williston-bound trips.; Discontinued June 17, 2019.
3 Lakeside Commuter	Burlington; Lakeside; Lakeside Avenue and Central Avenue	Burlington; Downtown Transit Center	Lakeside Avenue, Pine Street	Weekday AM rush periods, DTC-bound only.; Discontinued December 2, 2024 and replaced with one weekday AM trip via route 5.
10 Williston/Essex	Williston; Walmart	Essex Town; Sand Hill Road and River Road (See Notes)	Marshall Avenue, Maple Tree Place, Essex Road, Park Street (Essex Junction), then: Clockwise Loop: Main Street (Essex Junction), Essex Outlet Fair, Center Road, Sand Hill Road, River Road (Essex Town), Maple Street (Essex Junction)	No evening or weekend service.; Loop starts/ends at Essex Junction Amtrak Station.; Sand Hill Road/River Road is at about the 2/3 point in the loop.; Created from the former #10 (Williston-Essex) and #4 (Essex Center) routes.; Discontinued on June 16, 2025, replaced with the restored #4 Essex Center route.; Formerly the Orange Line.
12 UMall/Airport	South Burlington; University Mall (See Notes)	Burlington International Airport (See Notes)	Dorset Street, Kennedy Drive, then: Counter-clockwise Loop: Kennedy Drive, Airport Drive, White Street, Hinesburg Road	Daily service.; Burlington Airport is about the midpoint of the loop.; The last three PM trips Monday–Saturday and all Sunday trips are extended from University Mall to the Downtown Transit Center via Main Street. This is similar to the service pattern of the original Airport (1) route.; Previously known as the South Burlington Circulator.; Folded into the Purple Line (extended route 11) on June 17, 2019.
18 Sunday Service	Burlington; Downtown Transit Center		Counter-clockwise Loop: Pine Street (SB), Shelburne and South Union streets (NB), Pearl Street, Mansfield Avenue, Riverside Avenue, North Avenue (NB then SB), North Street	Sunday only, alternate trips serve Lakeside; covers Burlington neighborhoods served by routes 5, 6, 8 and 7 (in that order).; The first morning trip serves public housing and churches only.; Discontinued June 17, 2019.
36 Jeffersonville; Commuter	Burlington; Downtown Transit Center	Jeffersonville; Post Office	Burlington, Winooski, Colchester, Essex Junction, Essex Outlet Fair, Jericho, Underhill, Cambridge, Jeffersonville	Travels via VT 15.; Discontinued December 2, 2024.
46 Route 116 Commuter	Burlington; Downtown Transit Center	Hinesburg; Town Hall Park & Ride	All trips: Burlington, South Burlington, Hinesburg; Middlebury trips: Starksboro, Bristol, Middlebury	Travels via VT 116.; Middlebury trips operated by neighboring agency Tri-Valley Transit (TVT).; Discontinued October 7, 2024, with all service transferred to Tri-Valley Transit.
46 Route 116 Commuter	Burlington; Downtown Transit Center	Middlebury; Merchants Row	All trips: Burlington, South Burlington, Hinesburg; Middlebury trips: Starksboro, Bristol, Middlebury	Travels via VT 116.; Middlebury trips operated by neighboring agency Tri-Valley Transit (TVT).; Discontinued October 7, 2024, with all service transferred to Tri-Valley Transit.
56 Milton Commuter	Burlington; Downtown Transit Center	Milton; Town Office Park & Ride	Burlington, Winooski, Colchester, Milton	Travels via US 7.; Additional midday service.; Folded into route 96 effective August 25, 2025.
76 Middlebury LINK Express	Burlington; Downtown Transit Center	Middlebury; Academy Street	Burlington, Shelburne, Charlotte, Vergennes, Middlebury	Travels via US 7.; Discontinued July 1, 2021, with all service transferred to Tri-Valley Transit.
97 Barre LINK Express	Burlington; Downtown Transit Center	Barre; 255 North Main Street (Barre District Court)	Burlington, Richmond, Waterbury, Barre	Travels via I-89 and VT 62.; Route has been discontinued as of March 2020 due to COVID-19.
(NB): Northbound; (SB): Southbound

==== Non-Chittenden County routes ====
- 79 CVMC Barre Health Shuttle
- 88 Capital Shuttle
- 92 Montpelier Circulator
- 100 Route 100 Commuter
- 101 Mountain Road Shuttle
- 102 Morrisville Loop
- 103 Morrisville Shopping Shuttle
- 121 Valley Evening Service
- 126 SnowCap Commuter

==== Franklin/Grand Isle counties routes ====
- 109 Price Chopper Shopping Shuttle

The following routes are now operated by RCT as of January 1, 2026:

- 110 St. Albans Downtown Shuttle
- 115 Alburgh / Georgia Commuter
- 116 Richford / St. Albans Commuter

== Fares ==
As of May 20, 2024, the fare is $2.00, with a $4.00 daily cap, and a $50.00 monthly cap. Discounted fares for people under 17, over 60, or who are disabled are $1.00, with a $2.00 daily cap and a $25.00 monthly cap. Fares can be paid using the Ride Ready app, a smart card, contactless payment, or cash. However, the fare cap only applies when using the Ride Ready app. Fares do not apply on rural services.

== Current fleet ==
Most of the GMT fleet is made up of Gillig low-floor transit buses, although a number of New Flyer and Proterra buses are used. MCI long-distance buses and various shuttle buses built on Ford E-350 chassis have been purchased for intercity routes and transit service in outlying towns, respectively.
Note that this list is incomplete.

Photo	Manufacturer	Model	Fleet number(s)	Year	Notes
	Chevrolet	3500	2xx 4xx	unknown	Full fleet number range unknown.
	Ford	E-350	2xx 4xx	unknown	Full fleet number range unknown.
	Gillig	Low Floor 40'	940-941	2008	940 and 941 has been retired.
	Gillig	Low Floor 40'	942-949	2009	948 has been retired.
	Gillig	Low Floor 40'	950-962	2010-2013	950 and 954 have been retired
	Gillig	Low Floor 40'	963-971	2017	
	Gillig	Low Floor 40'	972-973	2019	
	Gillig	Low Floor 40'	4211-4213	2021	
	Gillig	Low Floor 40'	4221-4223	2022	
	Gillig	Low Floor 35'	5221-5223	2022	
	Proterra	Catalyst BE40	990-991	2020	First electric buses in the state of Vermont. More buses expected to be bought in 2021–2022.
	New Flyer	Xcelsior XD40	4231-4236 4241-4245	2023 2024	2024 buses are electric.

== Facilities ==
GMT's Downtown Transit Center is located in downtown Burlington on Saint Paul Street, between Pearl and Cherry Streets, with adjoining space along Pearl Street. The commuter and express routes (86, 96) generally operate from adjacent bus stops located on Pearl Street. GMT also has a transit center in Montpelier.
