= CCTA =

CCTA may refer to:

- Central Computer and Telecommunications Agency
- Chittenden County Transportation Authority
- Columbia Center for Theatrical Arts
- Coronary CT angiography
