= GMTA =

GMTA may refer to:

- Cherif Al Idrissi Airport (International Civil Aviation Organization airport code)
- Green Mountain Transit Authority
- The phrase "Great minds think alike."
