= Milton (CDP), Vermont =

Census-designated place in Vermont, United States

Milton, Vermont
- Census-designated place
- Location in Chittenden County and the state of Vermont
- Coordinates: 44°37′38″N 73°07′48″W
- Country: United States
- State: Vermont
- County: Chittenden
- Town: Milton

Area
  - Total: 1.4 sq mi (3.7 km^{2})
  - Land: 1.4 sq mi (3.6 km^{2})
  - Water: 0.039 sq mi (0.1 km^{2})
- Elevation: 285 ft (87 m)

Population (2020)
  - Total: 3,804
  - Density: 2,700/sq mi (1,100/km^{2})
- Time zone: UTC-5 (Eastern (EST))
  - Summer (DST): UTC-4 (EDT)
- ZIP code: 05468
- Area code: 802
- FIPS code: 50-45175
- GNIS feature ID: 2378131

Milton is an unincorporated village within the town of Milton in Chittenden County, Vermont, United States. The village disincorporated in 2003 and became a census-designated place (CDP) in 2008. As of the 2020 census the population was 3,804, out of a population of 10,723 people for the entire town.

== Geography ==
Milton is located in the east part of the town of Milton along the Lamoille River at the outlet of Arrowhead Mountain Lake. The river drops more than 100 feet (30 m) in elevation over ledges in the western part of the CDP. U.S. Route 7 passes through the center of town, leading north 13 miles (21 km) to St. Albans and south 16 miles (26 km) to Burlington.

According to the United States Census Bureau, the Milton CDP has a total area of 1.4 square miles (3.7 km^{2}), of which 1.4 square miles (3.6 km^{2}) is land and 0.04 square miles (0.1 km^{2}), or 2.90%, is water.

== Demographics ==
As of the census of 2000, there were 1,537 people, 570 households, and 421 families residing in the village. The population density was 1,044.2 people per square mile (403.7/km^{2}). There were 576 housing units at an average density of 391.3/sq mi (151.3/km^{2}). The racial makeup of the village was 97.53% White, 0.33% Black or African American, 0.39% Native American, 0.72% Asian, 0.20% from other races, and 0.85% from two or more races. Hispanic or Latino of any race were 0.59% of the population.

There were 570 households. Of these, 39.8% had children under the age of 18 living with them, 58.2% were married couples living together, 11.9% had a female householder with no husband present, and 26.1% were non-families. 20.5% of all households were made up of individuals, and 6.8% had someone living alone who was 65 years of age or older. The average household size was 2.70 and the average family size was 3.12.

In the village, the population was spread out, with 29.1% under the age of 18, 6.1% from 18 to 24, 34.1% from 25 to 44, 22.3% from 45 to 64, and 8.3% who were 65 years of age or older. The median age was 35 years. For every 100 females, there were 100.7 males. For every 100 females age 18 and over, there were 94.8 males.

The median income for a household in the village was $46,458, and the median income for a family was $48,882. Males had a median income of $34,792 versus $26,548 for females. The per capita income for the village was $18,037. About 6.5% of families and 6.5% of the population were below the poverty line, including 9.0% of those under age 18 and 6.9% of those age 65 or over.
