= Green Mountain Express =

Nonprofit organization in Vermont

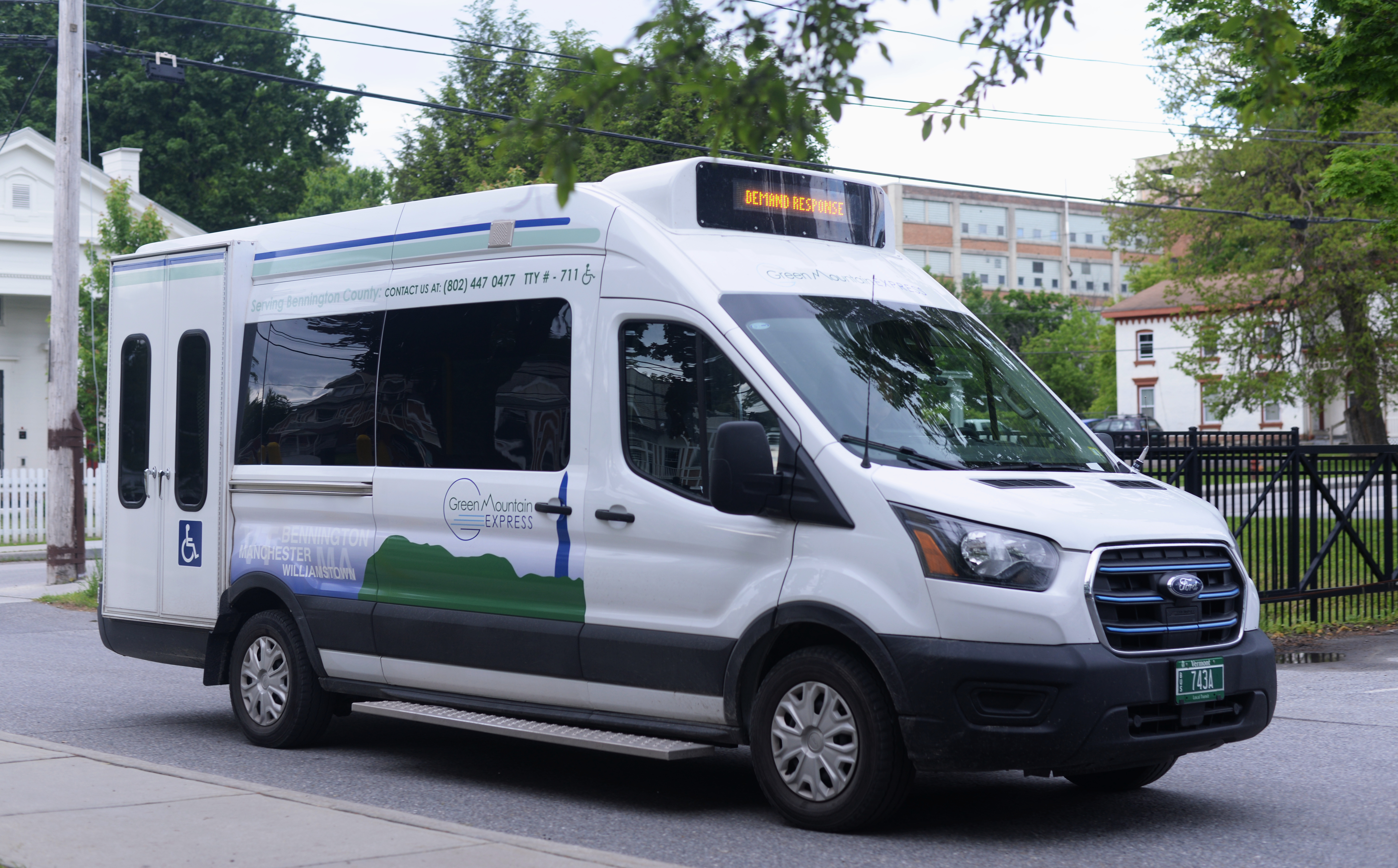
- GMX bus at the GMX bus terminal
- Founded: 2007
- Headquarters: 215 Pleasant St.
- Locale: Bennington, Vermont
- Service area: Bennington County, VT and fringes of adjacent counties
- Service type: bus service, paratransit
- Routes: 8 (5 local, 3 out-of-town connectors/commuters)
- Hubs: 215 Pleasant St., Bennington
- Fleet: 22
- Annual ridership: 64,900 (2010)
- Chief executive: Terence White
- Website: Green Mountain Express official website

The Green Mountain Express (GMX) is the public transit system by local bus in Bennington County in southwestern Vermont, owned and operated by the Green Mountain Community Network (GMCN), a private nonprofit organization. Their bus service currently has 3 local "fixed deviated" weekday routes in Bennington: the Red, Blue and Brown routes, which can deviate up to 1/4 mile from their alignment upon request. They also have two local Saturday (Green and Light Green) routes, and three commuter routes: the Orange Line, with weekday plus Saturday service to Manchester; the Purple Line, with weekday service to Williamstown, Massachusetts; and the Emerald line, with weekday service to Wilmington. The Emerald Line is a partnership between West Dover-based Southeast Vermont Transit's "the MOOver" and GMCN.

The company also provides paratransit and Medicaid transportation services for Bennington County.

GMX had an annual ridership of approximately 64,900 in fiscal year 2010, the second fewest of any public bus transit provider in Vermont for that time period when not including the Brattleboro BeeLine (now fully operated by the Current). They now have an annual ridership of about 135,000. There are 22 wheelchair-accessible vehicles in GMCN's fleet. Their management headquarters, bus garage and transit hub are located at 215 Pleasant Street in Bennington.

== History ==
=== Red Cross ownership ===
Bus service in Bennington was originally provided by the Green Mountain Chapter of the American Red Cross. The Red Cross was looking for ways to justify its presence in Bennington—since the area suffers few natural disasters—and decided on public transportation after a Department of Transportation study found that lower-income residents and senior citizens had trouble getting around Bennington. The Red Cross's pilot bus program began in 1993, and was expanded to two full-size buses in 1994.

In 1996, the Red Cross replaced its fleet with green-and-white buses and renamed the service the Green Mountain Express. Two buses ran daily, one covering a north-south route and the other covering an east-west route. In 1998, about 45,000 people used the service annually.

In 2000, the GMX began charging a 50-cent fare for riders on Bennington routes (the Bennington–Manchester route remained free).

=== Green Mountain Community Network ===
In 2007, the Red Cross transferred ownership of the GMX service to the Green Mountain Community Network (GMCN), a nonprofit organization founded by the Red Cross's board of directors. The reason for the new organization was to allow the GMCN to focus solely on providing transportation, rather than being one arm of the Red Cross's larger mission. After the GMCN bought the bus contract, office space, and the fleet of vehicles from the Red Cross, they began expanding the number of available bus routes, including a midday Saturday route.

On July 9, 2012, GMX added the Emerald Line to their schedule with weekday service to Wilmington, along with the opening of the renovated Pleasant St office building as their transit center. And as of March 18, 2019, the Yankee Trails Bennington shuttle and Vermont Translines' Albany to Burlington and Shires Connector intercity bus routes use the transit center as their main Bennington stops as well.

As of January 19, 2015, trip planning via Google Maps is also available for GMX bus routes. And as of November 10, 2019, live bus tracking is available on the Transit mobile application for Android and Apple devices.

In March 2020, GMX became one of the first public transit agencies in Vermont to go fare free because of the COVID-19 pandemic.

As of 2023, GMX maintains several partnerships with community organizations as part of its mission of "community outreach." These include partnerships with Sunrise Family Resource Center, Vermont Food Bank, Southwestern Vermont Council on Aging, United Counseling Service, Bennington Project Independence, and Vermont's Older Adults and Persons with Disabilities (O&D) Transportation Program. The O&D program through GMCN "supplements the regular transit service in the area, filling in gaps left by other transportation programs." In the past three years, GMCN's partnership with the state of Vermont's O&D program has provided over 20,000 rides to Bennington County community members.

== Route list ==
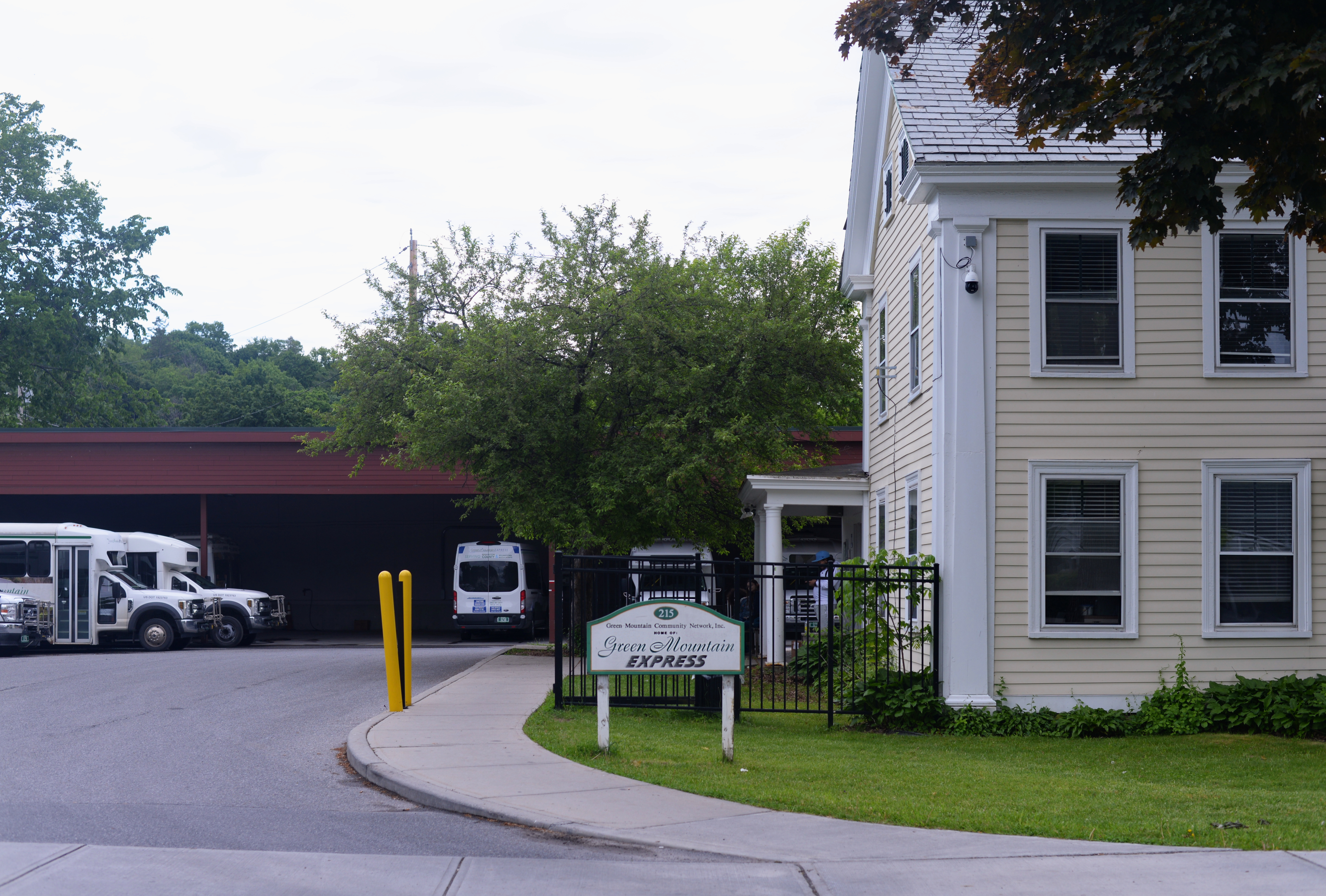
The transit hub at 215 Pleasant St

- Red Line (30 minute loop)
- Blue Line (30 minute loop)
- Brown Line (bidirectional line between Bennington College and the east end of town)
- Orange Line (bidirectional commuter line between Bennington and Manchester)
- Purple Line (bidirectional commuter line between Bennington and Williamstown, Massachusetts)
- Emerald Line (evening bidirectional commuter line between Bennington and Wilmington, morning service provided by Southeast Vermont Transit's "MOOver" 13 route)
- Green Line-North (Saturday loop)
- Green Line-South (Saturday loop)

In March 2020, in response to the COVID-19 pandemic, all routes shifted to a zero-fare policy. This policy was later extended through 2023, and the routes continue to operate without fares for all passengers as of August 2025.

=== Transfers ===
Bus-to-bus transfers are available as well between the three local routes (the Red, Blue and Brown Lines), but are not valid for round trips or when traveling northbound from Bennington on the Orange Line when traveling beyond Shaftsbury or southbound from Bennington on the Purple Line beyond Pownal.
