= Josephine E. Sizer =

Sizer in a 1937 publication.

Josephine E. Sizer (née Kirby; 1862-1937) was an American temperance reformer. She served as President of the Minnesota Woman's Christian Temperance Union (WCTU).

== Early life and education ==
Josephine Ellen Kirby was born at Milton Falls, Vermont, on June 2, 1862.

She was educated in the public schools of Burlington, Vermont.

== Career ==
Sizer became interested in the work of the WCTU in the earlier days of its history. In 1887, in New England, she organized a WCTU Union and assisted in the establishment of a school and church. In July of that year, she went to North Dakota, where she became active in local WCTU work. Removing to Wisconsin in 1904, she was elected president of the Racine and Kenosha Unions in 1908 and 1910. From 1909 to 1916, she served as secretary of the Young People's Branch of the Wisconsin WCTU.

In 1916, she removed to Minnesota and immediately became identified with the state WCTU. In 1920, she was elected vice-president. She served as state president from 1921 to 1931. She was afield during much of 1922, speaking at most of the thirty WCTU conventions in May, June, and July.

From 1931 until her death, she worked for the National WCTU as an organizer and lecturer.

== Personal life ==
Her first husband, Charles A. Sweet, died in 1890. On February 9, 1892, she married the Rev. Jason Lee Sizer, of Port Washington, Wisconsin. She had a son, L.V., and a daughter, Ethel.

Josephine Sizer died in Seattle in January 1937.
