= Chittenden County Transportation Authority =

Public transit system in Vermont, US

Coordinates: 44°27′01″N 73°13′13″W

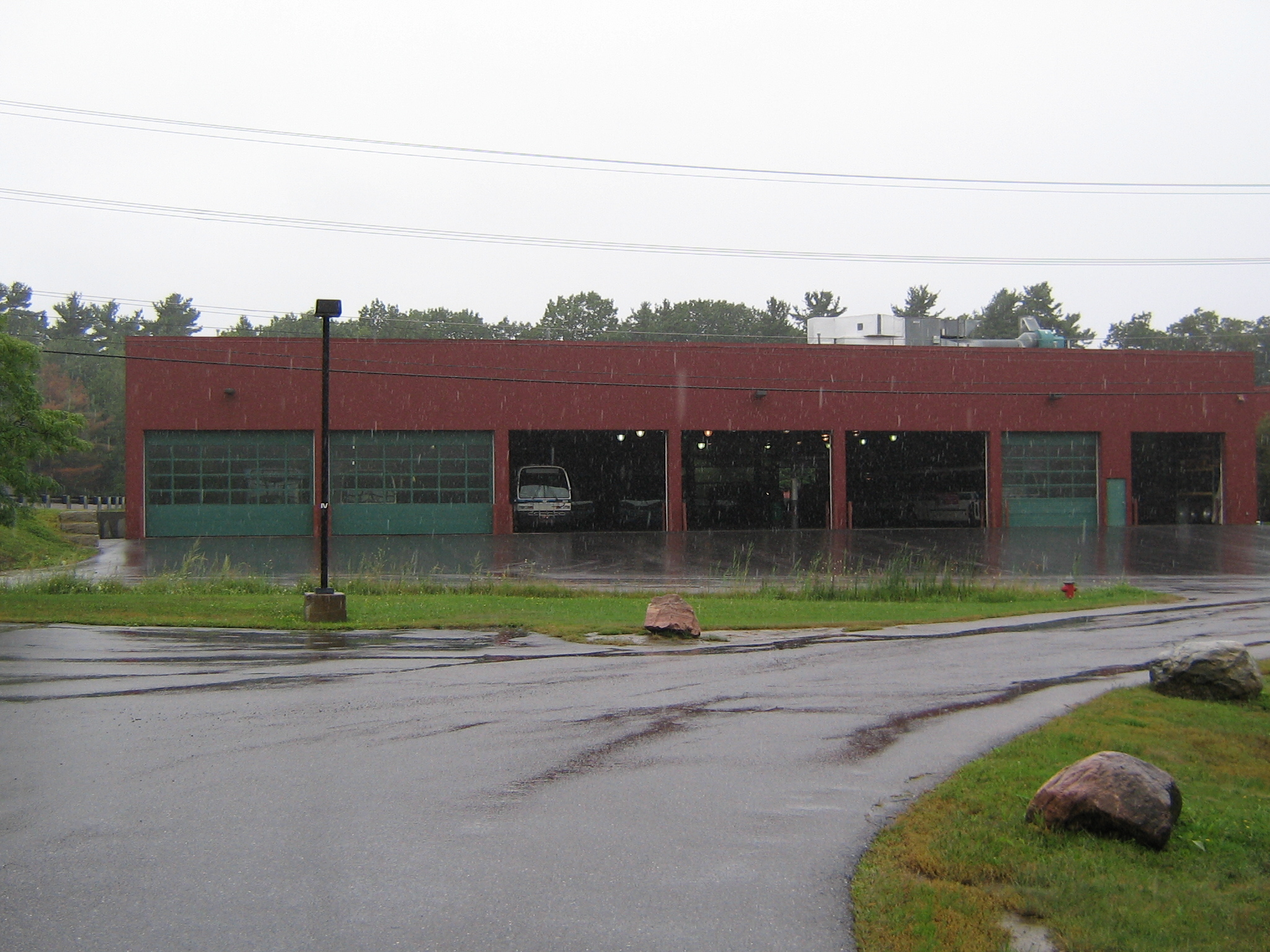
- CCTA Headquarters
- Founded: 1973
- Defunct: 2016 (merged into Green Mountain Transit)
- Headquarters: 15 Industrial Parkway
- Locale: Burlington, Vermont
- Service area: Chittenden County with express service to major towns in adjacent counties
- Service type: Bus service, commuter bus service
- Fleet: 70 buses
- Annual ridership: 2.5 million (2014)
- Website: cctaride.org

Chittenden County Transportation Authority (CCTA) was the public transit system headquartered in Burlington in Chittenden County, Vermont. CCTA served the communities of Burlington, Essex, South Burlington, Winooski, Shelburne, Williston and Milton. As well as providing regular bus routes to these member municipalities, CCTA also served parts of Colchester and had express routes for commuters travelling between Burlington and Montpelier, Middlebury, and St. Albans.

On March 17, 2014, a strike by the bus drivers' union shut down bus service, which was restored on April 4, 2014, after settlement of the strike.

On January 22, 2016, it was announced that the CCTA will be renamed to Green Mountain Transit, completing a merger with the Green Mountain Transit Authority to become a regional system. As of October 2016, the merger has been completed.

== Transit center, buses and routes ==
CCTA's transit center was located on Cherry Street in downtown Burlington. Most of the local routes operated from the portion of the terminal which occupies the south side of Cherry Street from Church Street to west of Saint Paul Street. All of the commuter and express routes (36, 46, 56, 76, 86, 96) were operated from Pearl Street in the vicinity of Saint Paul Street. As of May 2015, a replacement terminal was under construction on Saint Paul Street, between Pearl and Cherry Streets. The "Downtown Transit Center" was scheduled to be completed in 2016. The Downtown Transit Center opened October 13, 2016, in conjunction with the merger with the GMTA.

Most of the fleet is made up of Gillig low-floor transit buses, although a number of older RTS transit buses remain in use, particularly on Burlington Neighborhood Special (school bus) routes. In recent years, MCI long-distance buses and various shuttle buses built on Ford F350 chassis have been purchased for intercity routes and transit service in outlying towns, respectively.

=== Local routes ===
Most local routes operated Monday through Saturday with 30-minute service patterns during the day, with most services leaving Cherry Street at :15 and :45 after the hour. Some busier routes have 15-minute service during rush hours. Rush hours are generally 6:30 to 9:00 a.m. and 3:00 to 6:30 p.m. weekdays.

Route	Terminals		Streets traveled	Notes
1 * Williston	Burlington; Cherry Street Terminal	Williston; Walmart	Main Street, Williston Road (South Burlington, Williston), Marshall Avenue	Daily service.; Serves University Mall.; Late evening inbound 1 serves Burlington International Airport; Route 1E shortened and renumbered to 10 on August 24, 2015
1V Williston Village	Burlington; Cherry Street Terminal	Williston Village; Williston Road and Southridge Road	Main Street, Williston Road (South Burlington, Williston), ... Clockwise Loop: Industrial Avenue, Mountain View Road, North Williston Road (see Notes)	Weekday rush periods only along with one mid-day trip.; AM trips clockwise loop through Williston Village, PM trips counter-clockwise.; Only serves University Mall AM/mid-day Williston-bound trips.
2 * Essex Junction	Burlington; Cherry Street Terminal	Essex Junction; Amtrak Station	Colchester Avenue, East Allen Street (Winooski), College Parkway (Colchester), Pearl Street (Essex Junction)	Daily service as of August 24, 2015; Some rush trips serve IBM in Essex Junction.; Late evening service Friday and Saturday to Fort Ethan Allen while Saint Michael's College is in session.
3 Lakeside Commuter	Burlington - Lakeside; Lakeside Avenue and Central Avenue	Burlington; Cherry Street Terminal	Lakeside Avenue, Pine Street	Weekday AM rush periods, inbound only.
4 Essex Center	Essex Junction; Amtrak Station		Clockwise Loop: Main Street (Essex Junction), Essex Outlet Fair, Center Road, Sand Hill Road, River Road (Essex Center), Maple Street (Essex Junction)	Weekdays only, no late morning service.; Rush trips serve IBM by on-board request.
5 * Pine Street	Burlington; Cherry Street Terminal	Burlington - South End; Baird Street/Park and Ride; Queen City Park Road and Pine Street	Saint Paul Street, Pine Street	Late evening service via other routes' out of service buses and is signed as PINE ST TO GARAGE.; Some Saturday trips serve Lakeside.
6 Shelburne Road	Burlington; Cherry Street Terminal	Shelburne Museum	South Union Street, Shelburne Road	Some rush trips extended to Vermont Teddy Bear Company.
7 North Avenue	Burlington; Cherry Street Terminal	Burlington - Northgate Apartments; Fairfield Drive and North Avenue	North Street, North Avenue	Non-rush daytime trips serve Heineberg Road.
8 * City Loop	Burlington; Cherry Street Terminal	Clockwise Loop (See Notes)	North Avenue, North Street, Archibald Street, North Prospect Street, Maple Street, Battery Street	Alternate buses serve Fern Hill or McAuley Square (about the halfway point of the loop) and are signed as such.; 15-minute service during the AM rush.; Pre-June 2008, known as "Old North End Loop" with bi-directional service.
9 Riverside/Winooski	Burlington; Cherry Street Terminal	Winooski; Champlain Mill (See Notes)	Elmwood Avenue, Riverside Avenue... Counter-clockwise Loop: Barlow Street, Main Street (Winooski), Weaver Street, Malletts Bay Avenue	The Winooski Loop starts/ends at the Champlain Mill.; Late morning buses skip the Winooski Loop and return to Burlington.
10 Williston/Essex	Williston; Walmart	Essex Junction; Amtrak Station	Marshall Avenue, Maple Tree Place, Essex Road, Park Street (Essex Junction)	"New" route August 24, 2015; Formerly the Essex section of route 1E.
11 * College Street Shuttle	Burlington; Waterfront/Boathouse; College Street	UVM Medical Center; Main Entrance	College Street, Colchester Avenue	Daily and evening service from Memorial Day to Columbus Day, otherwise weekday service only.; Service is fare-free, and runs every 15 minutes weekdays and weekend mid-days and afternoons.; UVM MC formerly known as Fletcher Allen Health Care.
12 UMall/Airport	South Burlington; University Mall	Burlington International Airport (See Notes)	Dorset Street, Kennedy Drive, ... Counter-clockwise Loop: Kennedy Drive, Airport Drive, White Street, Hinesburg Road	Daily service.; Burlington Airport is about the midpoint of the loop.; Certain Monday–Saturday PM trips and all Sunday trips are extended from University Mall to the Cherry Street Terminal. This is similar to the service pattern of the original Airport (1) route.; Renamed from South Burlington Circulator on August 24, 2015.
18 Sunday Service	Burlington; Cherry Street Terminal		Counter-clockwise Loop: Pine Street (SB), Shelburne and South Union streets (NB), Pearl Street, Mansfield Avenue, Riverside Avenue, Burlington Beltline (NB), North Avenue (SB)	Sunday only, alternate trips serve Lakeside.; The first morning trip serves public housing and churches only.; No stops on the Burlington Beltline.

(*) denotes routes with 15-minute service.
NB: Northbound; SB: Southbound

=== Commuter and express routes ===
Commuter and express routes operate weekday rush periods only unless otherwise noted and are limited stop.

Route	Terminals		Serves	Notes
36 Jeffersonville; Commuter	Burlington; Cherry Street Terminal	Jeffersonville; Post Office	Burlington, Winooski, Colchester, Essex Junction, Essex Outlet Fair, Jericho, Underhill, Cambridge, Jeffersonville	Travels via VT 15.
46 Route 116 Commuter	Burlington; Cherry Street Terminal	Hinesburg; Town Hall Park & Ride	All trips: Burlington, South Burlington, Hinesburg; Middlebury trips: Starksboro, Bristol, Middlebury	Travels via VT 116.; Service past Hinesburg is operated by ACTR.
46 Route 116 Commuter	Burlington; Cherry Street Terminal	Middlebury; Merchants Row	All trips: Burlington, South Burlington, Hinesburg; Middlebury trips: Starksboro, Bristol, Middlebury	Travels via VT 116.; Service past Hinesburg is operated by ACTR.
56 Milton Commuter	Burlington; Cherry Street Terminal	Milton; Town Office Park & Ride	Burlington, Winooski, Colchester, Milton	Travels via US 7.; Additional midday and evening service.
76 Middlebury LINK Express	Burlington; Cherry Street Terminal	Middlebury; Merchants Row	Burlington, South Burlington, Shelburne, Charlotte, Ferrisburgh, Vergennes, Middlebury	Travels via US 7.; Additional Saturday service operated by neighboring agency Addison County Transit Resources (ACTR).
86 Montpelier LINK Express	Burlington; Cherry Street Terminal	Montpelier; Main Street and State Street	Burlington, South Burlington, Richmond, Waterbury, Montpelier	Travels via I-89.; Additional midday service.
96 St. Albans LINK Express	Burlington; Cherry Street Terminal	St. Albans; Highgate Commons	Burlington, Winooski, Colchester, Georgia, St. Albans	Travels via US 7 and I-89.

=== Shopping specials ===
These are shuttle buses that each operate one day per week, in the morning, to/from senior housing centers. The general public is welcome on these routes.

Route	Terminals		Serves	Notes
Hannaford Shopping Special	South Burlington; See "Serves"	University Mall; Hannaford	Pillsbury Manor, The Pines, Country Park	Tuesday service only.
Price Chopper Shopping Special	Winooski; See "Serves"	South Burlington; Price Chopper	The Courtyard, 83 Barlow Street, Spring Garden, Fern Hill*, McAuley Square*, Cherry Street Terminal*	Wednesday service only.
Price Chopper Shopping Special	Burlington; See "Serves"	South Burlington; Price Chopper	10 North Champlain Street, 3 Cathedral Square, Decker Towers, Heineberg Housing, McKenzie House, 101 College Street	Thursday service only.

(*) denotes Burlington destinations

== Fare schedule ==
(information is current as of June 18, 2013)

- $1.25 per one-way trip on local routes ($0.60 for discount qualified riders)
- $12.00 for Adult 10-ride pass ($6.00 for discount qualified riders)
- $50.00 for Adult monthly (31-day) pass ($25.00 for discount qualified riders)

Free transfers are available for those needing to connect one-way on another bus. They are not valid for round trips. Fletcher Allen Health Care employees may receive a 25% discount on LINK Express passes. University of Vermont, St. Michael's College, Champlain College and Middlebury College students may receive free bus fare for most CCTA routes. No discount fares are currently available on Local Commuter or LINK Express routes.

=== LINK Express route fares ===
- $4.00 per one-way trip
- $150 for Adult Monthly Pass (valid on all CCTA and GMTA routes)
- $40 for 10-ride pass

=== Local commuter route fares ===
- $2.00 per one-way trip
- $75 for Adult Monthly Pass (valid on all CCTA and GMTA routes)
- $20 for 10-ride pass
