= Rural Community Transportation =

Public bus system in Vermont

Rural Community Transportation, Inc.
- Founded: 1991
- Headquarters: Lyndonville, Vermont
- Locale: St. Johnsbury, Vermont
- Service area: Northern Vermont
- Service type: bus service, paratransit
- Website: www.riderct.org

Rural Community Transportation, Inc. (RCT) is a nonprofit, public transportation system headquartered in Lyndonville, Vermont. RCT serves the Northeast Kingdom (Caledonia, Essex and Orleans counties) and Lamoille county. It provides regular bus and shuttle routes for commuters and shoppers as well as on-demand rides. RCT is heavily supported by volunteer drivers and a number of community partners. All services provided by RCT are fare-free.

== Fixed routes ==
There is no service on weekends. Some routes allow for a deviation of up to ¾ miles from the scheduled route upon passenger request.

Rural Community Transportation bus routes as of 2025.

Name	Inbound terminus	Outbound terminus	Deviation on request?	Notes
Jay-Lyn Shuttle/Express	St. Johnsbury	Lyndon	Yes	
US 2 Commuter	Montpelier	St. Johnsbury	No	Connection to Green Mountain Transit (GMT) in Montpelier
Morrisville Shopper	Morrisville	Stowe	Yes	
Route 100 Commuter	Waterbury	Morrisville	No	Connection to GMT in Waterbury
Greenleaf Shopper	Lyndon	Woodsville, New Hampshire	Yes	Only runs on the second and fourth Tuesdays of each month

The following former Green Mountain Transit (GMT) routes in Franklin and Grand Isle counties were taken over by RCT on January 1, 2026:

- 110 St. Albans Downtown Shuttle
- 115 Alburgh / Georgia Commuter
- 116 Richford / St. Albans Commuter

== Other services ==
RCT operates a rural microtransit service called RCT Rides in Lamoille County and Orleans County. There is also a medical appointment transportation service for Medicaid users, and a paratransit service open to people who are disabled or over the age of 60.
