= Milton, Vermont =

- Town
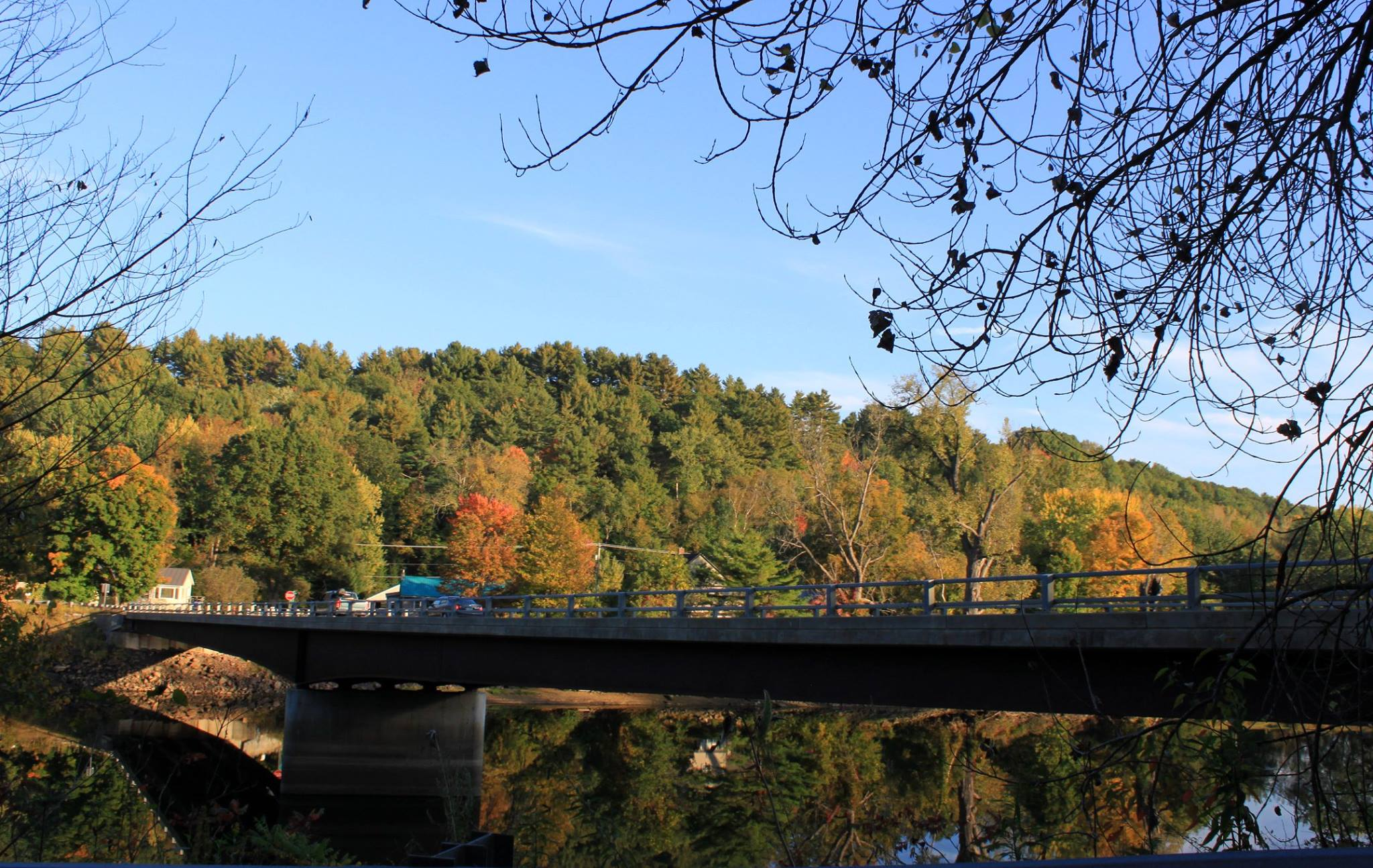
- West Milton Bridge, Highway 40 over the Lamoille River

- Flag Seal

- Location in Chittenden County and the state of Vermont
- Coordinates: 44°37′40″N 73°10′05″W
- Country: United States
- State: Vermont
- County: Chittenden
- Communities: Milton; West Milton; Checkerberry Village; Cozy Corner; West View

Area
  - Total: 60.9 sq mi (157.7 km^{2})
  - Land: 51.5 sq mi (133.3 km^{2})
  - Water: 9.4 sq mi (24.4 km^{2})
- Elevation: 266 ft (81 m)

Population (2020)
  - Total: 10,723
  - Density: 208.3/sq mi (80.44/km^{2})
- Time zone: UTC-5 (Eastern (EST))
  - Summer (DST): UTC-4 (EDT)
- ZIP code: 05468
- Area code: 802
- FIPS code: 50-45250
- GNIS feature ID: 1462149
- Website: https://www.miltonvt.gov/

Milton is a town in Chittenden County, Vermont, United States. As of the 2020 census, the population was 10,723. According to local legend, the town was named after the English poet John Milton, but the name most likely originated from William Fitzwilliam, 4th Earl Fitzwilliam, who held the title Viscount Milton and was a supporter of independence for the colonies during the American Revolution.

Milton has a municipal building, school system, library, police force, fire department, rescue squad, several churches, as well as civic and social organizations. The Town website can be found here: https://www.miltonvt.gov/

== History ==
Milton was chartered by Governor Benning Wentworth of New Hampshire on June 8, 1763. In February 1782, the town was first settled by William Irish, Leonard Owen, Amos Mansfield, Absalom Taylor, and Thomas Dewey. There were approximately 300 settlers living in Milton by 1795. It was necessary to build a new meeting place, as meeting in private homes would no longer suffice. The Town House was built in 1849. In 1878, it was destroyed by a fire.

Early settlers in Milton made most of their income from lumber and potash until 1840, when dairy became popular and butter and cheese were sold. Eventually, milk was also shipped to Boston and New York.

Milton was the home of Catamount Speedway, which operated from 1965 until 1988. Many drivers who raced there went on to prominent careers, including Shelburne native Kevin Lepage.

== Geography ==
Milton is located in northern Chittenden County, bordered by Franklin County to the north and Grand Isle County to the northwest, across an arm of Lake Champlain. The town includes the community of Milton in the east, as well as the communities of Cozy Corner, West View, Checkerberry Village, Milton Falls, Milton Village, and West Milton from east to west across the center of the town. The Lamoille River flows from northeast to southwest across the town, entering Lake Champlain at the town's southwestern corner. U.S. Route 2 crosses the eastern arm of Lake Champlain to Grand Isle from Sand Point, just north of the Lamoille River delta. Sand Bar State Park is located along Route 2.

According to the United States Census Bureau, the town of Milton has a total area of 60.9 square miles (157.7 km^{2}), of which 51.5 square miles (133.3 km^{2}) is land and 9.4 square miles (24.4 km^{2}), or 15.62%, is water.

== Communities ==
Milton is home to many communities, many of which exist due to the travel limitations before the automobile. As such, many now only house people and have no churches, stores, or schools. A list of the Communities of the Town of Milton:

- Milton Falls (based around the Route 7 Main Street intersection)
- Milton Village (based around the Milton schools and Milton Square)
- Cozy Corners (based around the Middle Road Railroad Street intersection)
- West View (located between Checkerberry Village and Cozy Corners)
- Checkerberry Village (based around Checkerberry Square which now longer exists)
- West Milton (everything west of the La Moille/Lamoille river plus some land mainly on the riverbank of the east side of the La Moille/Lamoille river)
- Miltonboro Village (based around the Miltonboro Church [Miltonboro church no longer exists] and Cemetery)
- Miltonboro (North West Corner of the Town of Milton)
- Sopertown (based around the Everest Road, Beebe Hill Road intersection)

Milton Falls was where historically many businesses operated. Although now most businesses operate in Milton Village, many of the larger commercial businesses are located in Milton Square. Miltonboro Village is a small community completely surrounded by Miltonboro. It is where many who lived in West Milton and Miltonboro went to mail letters, go to church, get on the stagecoach or meet people getting off of it. Miltonboro Village is not very relevant today as it is just made up of three houses and a cemetery, but at one point in time there was a stagecoach station, a post office, a church, a cemetery, some houses and farms, and possibly a general store, many of which were located on a road that came off of Beebe Hill Road and housed most of the aforementioned buildings, although said road is now gone. Information or photos of Miltonboro are hard to find because during its time as a strong community it was very rural and not many photographs were taken.

== Demographics ==
Historical population
Census	Pop.	Note	%±
1790	282		—
1800	786		178.7%
1810	1,548		96.9%
1820	1,746		12.8%
1830	2,100		20.3%
1840	2,136		1.7%
1850	2,451		14.7%
1860	1,963		−19.9%
1870	2,062		5.0%
1880	2,006		−2.7%
1890	1,585		−21.0%
1900	1,804		13.8%
1910	1,648		−8.6%
1920	1,523		−7.6%
1930	1,663		9.2%
1940	1,750		5.2%
1950	1,874		7.1%
1960	2,022		7.9%
1970	4,495		122.3%
1980	6,829		51.9%
1990	8,404		23.1%
2000	9,479		12.8%
2010	10,352		9.2%
2020	10,723		3.6%
U.S. Decennial Census

As of the census of 2000, there were 9,479 people, 3,333 households, and 2,609 families residing in the town. The population density was 184.2 people per square mile (71.1/km^{2}). There were 3,505 housing units at an average density of 68.1 per square mile (26.3/km^{2}). There were 3,333 households. Of these, 41.6% had children under the age of 18 living with them, 65.8% were married couples living together, 8.7% had a female householder with no husband present, and 21.7% were non-families. Of all households, 15.3% were made up of individuals, and 4.0% had someone living alone who was 65 years of age or older. The average household size was 2.84 and the average family size was 3.17.

In the town, the population was spread out, with 28.7% under the age of 18, 7.1% from 18 to 24, 35.8% from 25 to 44, 22.6% from 45 to 64, and 5.8% who were 65 years of age or older. The median age was 34 years. For every 100 females, there were 100.5 males. For every 100 females age 18 and over, there were 98.8 males.

The median income for a household in the town was $49,379, and the median income for a family was $50,972. Males had a median income of $36,149 versus $27,256 for females. The per capita income for the town was $20,048. About 4.2% of families and 5.1% of the population were below the poverty line, including 7.0% of those under age 18 and 6.0% of those age 65 or over.

== Government ==
=== Public safety ===
In 2008, property crimes increased by 54.9%. The number of incidents for all crime was 706.

The town of Milton maintains a Volunteer Fire Department, a Volunteer Rescue squad, and a full time Police Department serving the town 24/7. The fire department was established in 1937, originally operating out of a small station on Main St. In 2003, they were moved to a large new station on Bombardier Rd next to the Town Offices and Rescue Squad. The Milton Rescue Service was established in 1966 by members of the Fire Department for providing transport to the hospital. Today they operate two ambulances for in town and mutual aid calls to neighboring towns and are licensed up to the Paramedic level. They are located on Bombardier Rd next to the Fire Department. The Milton Police Department was established in 1968 and provides Twenty four hour 911 assistance and policing to the Town of Milton. Included in their operations is a K-9 units, School Resource officers, and 17 full-time Officers.

== Transportation ==
The Chittenden County Transportation Authority provides weekday commuter bus service. Stops include the Milton Town Office Park & Ride and the Chimney Corner Park & Ride.

=== Major highways ===
- Interstate 89
- U.S. Route 2
- U.S. Route 7

== Education ==
Milton Elementary School (MES):

- In May 2012, the Odyssey of the Mind team participated in the World Finals.
- In March 2013, a group of students and teachers from the elementary school were invited to the White House to join First Lady Michelle Obama in planting the kitchen garden in early April. This was, in part, related to the initiatives the school food service director Steve Marinelli implemented that support Let's Move!, as well as his blog.

Milton Middle School (MMS):

- The Odyssey of the Mind team participated in the World Finals in 2010 and 2015.

Milton High School (MHS):

- The Theatre Company produces a musical in the fall and a one-act play in the spring. The one-act is presented at the regional level. Milton's has been chosen to advance to the state level multiple times where it then competes to be selected as one of two schools to represent Vermont at the New England Drama Festival showcase. Milton has done so in 2002 (The Drowned and the Saved), 2004 (Women and Wallace), 2011 (MacBeth), 2012 (A Midsummer Night's Dream), 2014 (Oedipus Rex), and 2015 (Beowulf).
- Milton hosted the New England Drama Festival in 2003.
- In 2016, Milton seniors won first (Meredith Holbrook) and third (Ryan Racicot) place in U.S. Senator Bernie Sanders' annual State of the Union essay contest. Two other Milton seniors (Megan Bromley and Sara Manfredi) were top twenty finalists. Essays of the winners and finalists will be entered into the Congressional Record.

== Economy ==
Milton has been home to many farms over the years, most of which were dairy farms. As of 2024, only three dairy farms are still in operation in Milton.

The town is home to the warehouse for Gardener's Supply and a manufacturing facility for Husky Injection Molding Systems.

== In popular culture ==
Milton was a filming location for some of the scenes in the Farrelly brothers movie Me, Myself & Irene, which starred Jim Carrey and Renée Zellweger.

On May 25, 2016, American singer-songwriter Daya performed an exclusive concert at Milton High School; fellow Artbeatz recording artist Symon performed in the concert as well.

== Notable people ==
- George Allen, born in Milton, noted clergyman and academic
- Heman Allen, U.S. Congressman
- David R. Bean, Wisconsin legislator; was born in Milton
- Edwin E. Bryant, Wisconsin legislator; was born in Milton
- Jean-Paul Cyr, stock car racer
- David E. Demag, US Marshal for Vermont
- Luther S. Dixon, Chief Justice of the Wisconsin Supreme Court
- John G. Haskell, architect who designed Kansas public buildings including the capitol
- Michael Hastings, journalist and author
- George LeClair, Major League Baseball pitcher
- John Palasik, Vermont state legislator
- Josephine E. Sizer (1862-1937), temperance reformer
- Apollos Smith, born in Milton, wilderness guide, founder of wilderness resort, eponym of Paul Smiths, New York
- Noah Smith, one of the founders of Vermont and a justice of the Vermont Supreme Court
- Donald H. Turner, Minority Leader of the Vermont House of Representatives
- Alson Wood, born in Milton, Wisconsin State Assemblyman
