= Marble Valley Regional Transit District =

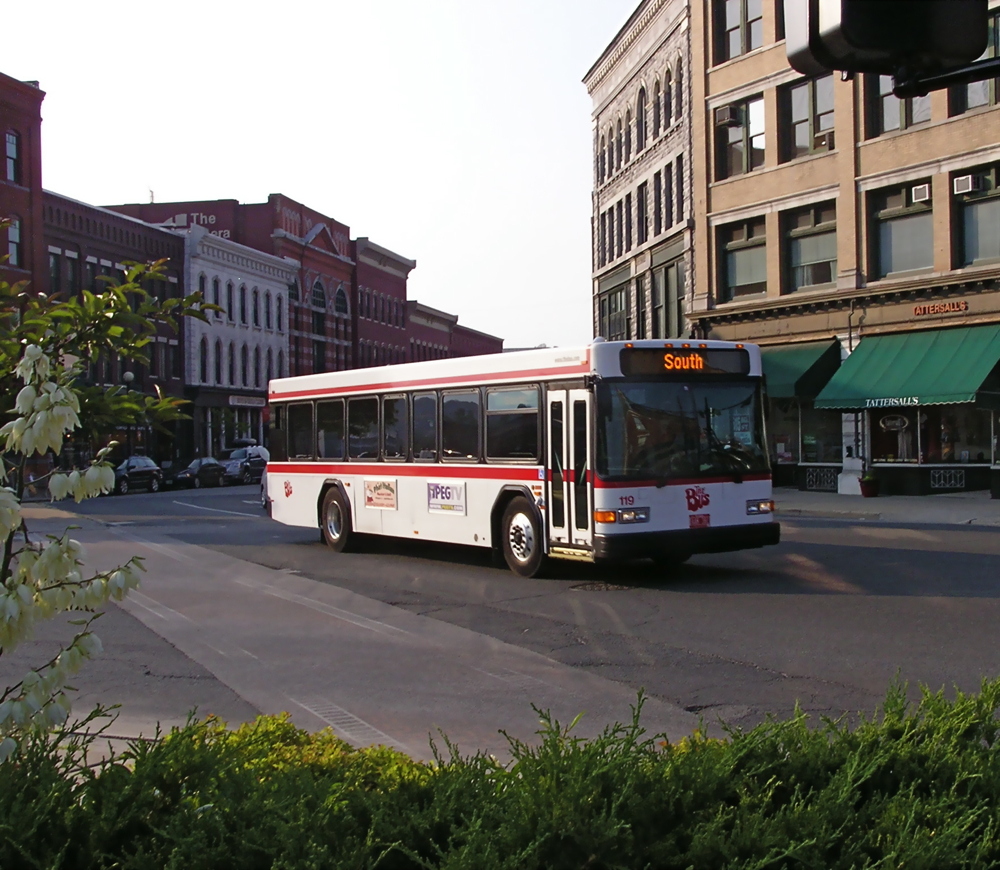
- The Bus, downtown Rutland.
- Founded: 1976; 49 years ago
- Headquarters: 165 Spruce St.
- Locale: Rutland, Vermont
- Service area: Rutland County, VT and surrounding communities
- Service type: bus service, express bus service, paratransit
- Routes: 11 (5 local, 6 out-of-town commuter/connectors)
- Hubs: 1 (Marble Valley Regional Transit Center on West St in downtown Rutland)
- Fleet: 65
- Annual ridership: 475,900 (2010)
- Chief executive: Jade McClallen
- Website: thebus.com

Marble Valley Regional Transit District (MVRTD) operates a public transportation system in Rutland County, Vermont called The Bus. The company currently has full bus service to Rutland and West Rutland, as well as limited daily bus service to Castleton, Fair Haven, Poultney and Killington. Limited weekday service is available to Ludlow and Proctor. It also provides weekday and Saturday service to Middlebury and Manchester, Vermont. The Bus also operates paratransit and Medicaid Transportation services for Rutland County.

The company attempted to expand service to the east to areas such as White River Junction, Vermont and Lebanon, New Hampshire in August 2009, following the acquisition and dissolution of the Vermont Transit brand by Greyhound.

There are 65 vehicles in MVRTD's fleet, most of which are wheelchair accessible. The company's main hub is housed in the Marble Valley Regional Transit Center, on the lower level of the West St parking garage in downtown Rutland. The Bus had an annual ridership of 475,900 in fiscal year 2010.

As of March 3, 2015, trip planning on Google Maps is available for all MVRTD bus routes.

== Route list ==
=== City fixed ===
- North
- South
- West
- Hospital

=== Out of town and commuter routes ===
- Rutland-Killington Commuter (formerly the Diamond Express)
- Proctor route
- Rutland-Ludlow Connector (operates during the winter months)
- Rutland-Middlebury Connector
- Fair Haven-Rutland Connector
- Manchester-Rutland Connector
