= Vermont Teddy Bear Company =

U.S. toy manufacturer

Coordinates: 44°21′41″N 73°13′48″W

- Type: Privately held company
- Industry: Manufacturing, retail
- Founded: 1983; 43 years ago
- Headquarters: Shelburne, Vermont
- Products: Teddy bears
- Parent: The Vermont Flannel Company
- Subsidiaries: Current; PajamaGram; PajamaJeans; Addison Meadow; Former; Calyx & Corolla; Gift Bag Boutique; TastyGram
- Website: Vermont Teddy Bear Company

The Vermont Teddy Bear Company (VTB) is one of the largest producers of teddy bears and the largest seller of teddy bears by mail order and Internet. The company handcrafts each of its teddy bears and produces almost 500,000 teddy bears each year. The company was formerly traded on the NASDAQ stock exchange under the ticker symbol BEAR, but was taken private by The Mustang Group, a Boston-based private equity firm, on September 30, 2005, partially to avoid the reporting requirements of the Sarbanes-Oxley Act. On April 8th, 2024, The Vermont Flannel Company announced it had acquired VTB.

== History ==
The company was founded in 1983 by John Sortino, who sold handcrafted teddy bears in an open-air market in Burlington, Vermont. Sortino happened upon the idea of packaging and selling bears through the mail when a tourist visiting Burlington wanted a bear mailed to her home. The concept was called the "Bear-Gram", which features the customized teddy bear placed in a box (complete with an "air hole") and stuffed with other goodies.

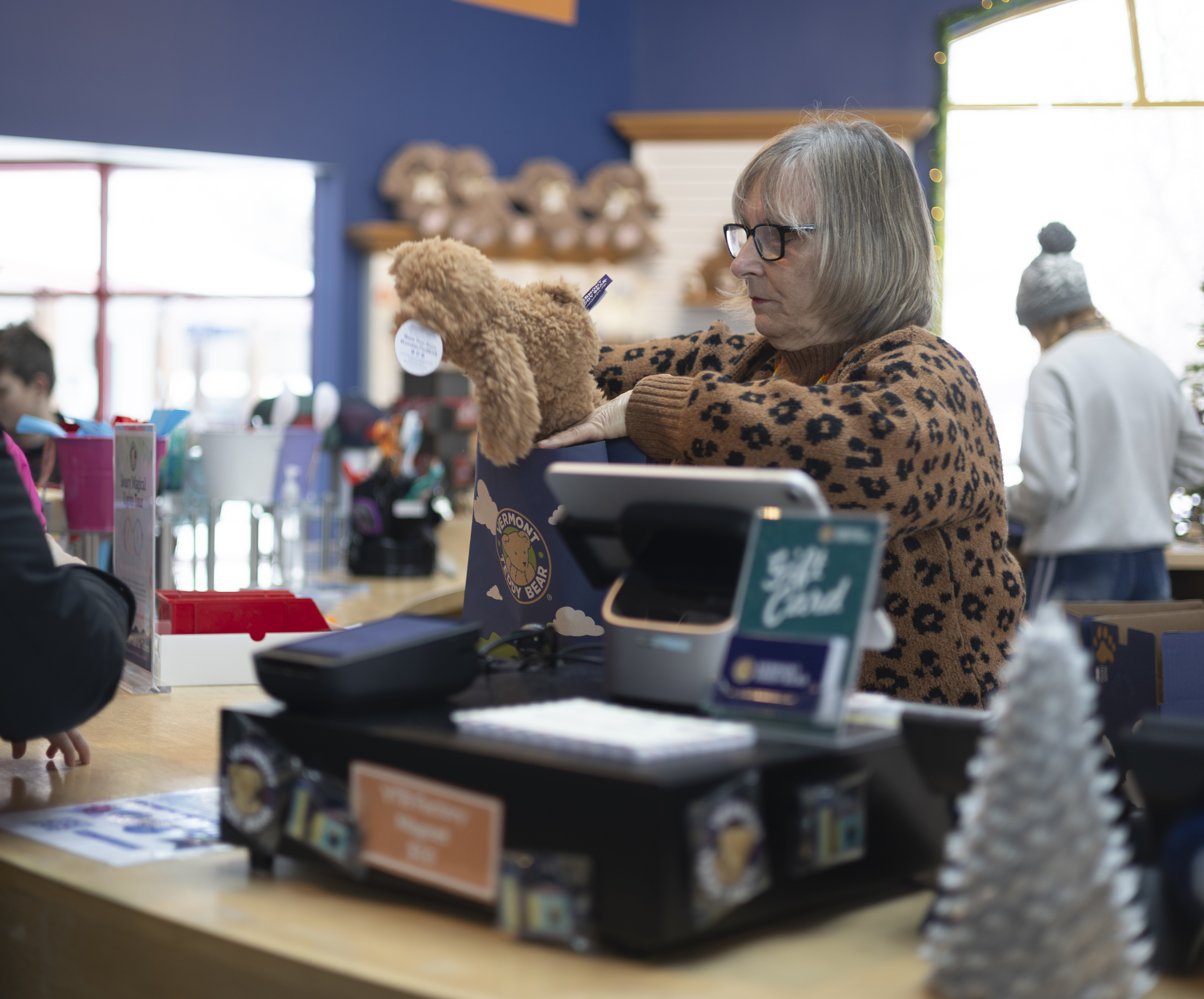
A retail employee placing a teddy bear into a branded gift box.

By 1995, VTB had sponsored on the U.S. East Coast various guns-for-bears exchanges and expanded to the U.S. West Coast in 1996 starting with UC Irvine's Student Physicians for Social Responsibility and the Brea Police Department.

In May 1997, the Vermont Teddy Bear Co. filed a copyright infringement suit against Disney over "Pooh-Grams" being similar to its mail-order "Bear-Gram" trademark and logo.

VTB acquired Calyx & Corolla, an upscale flower company headquartered in Vero Beach, Florida, in 2003 but is no longer associated with VTB. One of Vermont Teddy Bear's marketing slogans claimed that sending a teddy bear is "a creative alternative to sending flowers." In 2005, the company launched a new sister company, Gift Bag Boutique, which offered handbags and purses along with many make-up accessories. Along with PajamaGram, which sold gift pajamas, and TastyGram, which offered gourmet food gifts, the creation of this sister company brought the total number of companies under the Vermont Teddy Bear umbrella to five. Gift Bag Boutique and TastyGram stopped accepting orders as of June 26, 2008.

== Controversy ==
For Valentine's Day of 2005, Vermont Teddy Bear caused widespread controversy by offering a "Crazy for You" Bear which wore a white strait jacket with a red heart embroidered and a tag entitled "Commitment Papers" came with the bear. When mental health groups from all over the U.S. asked for the bear to be pulled out of production, VTB kept the bear up for sale but sold out quickly and Elizabeth Robert, the company head, resigned from the board of Vermont's largest hospital, Fletcher Allen Health Care. Then, in May of that year VTB agreed to be acquired by a Mustang-Group-led investment group for $6.50 a share.

== Factory and Retail Store ==
In 1995, the company moved into its new headquarters in Shelburne in Vermont's Champlain Valley. A satellite factory in Newport was closed in June 2010. A popular tourist destination, the Vermont Teddy Bear Factory in Shelburne offers tours of their factory, hosting over 50,000 visitors every year.

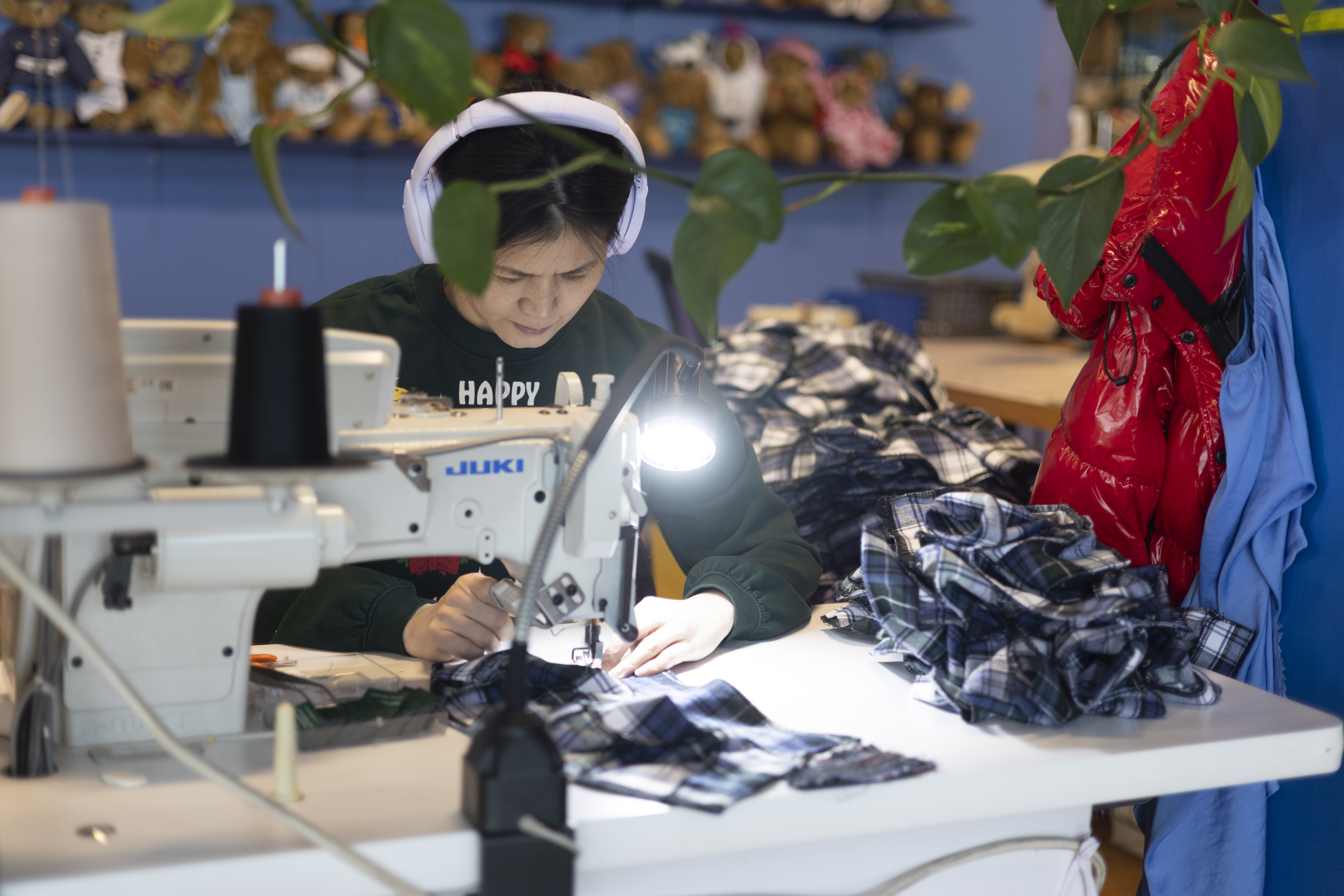
A worker sewing teddy bear clothing on an industrial sewing machine at the Vermont Teddy Bear factory.

The "Make a Friend for Life" room at the Vermont Teddy Bear Factory allows visitors to participate in assembling a bear for purchase.

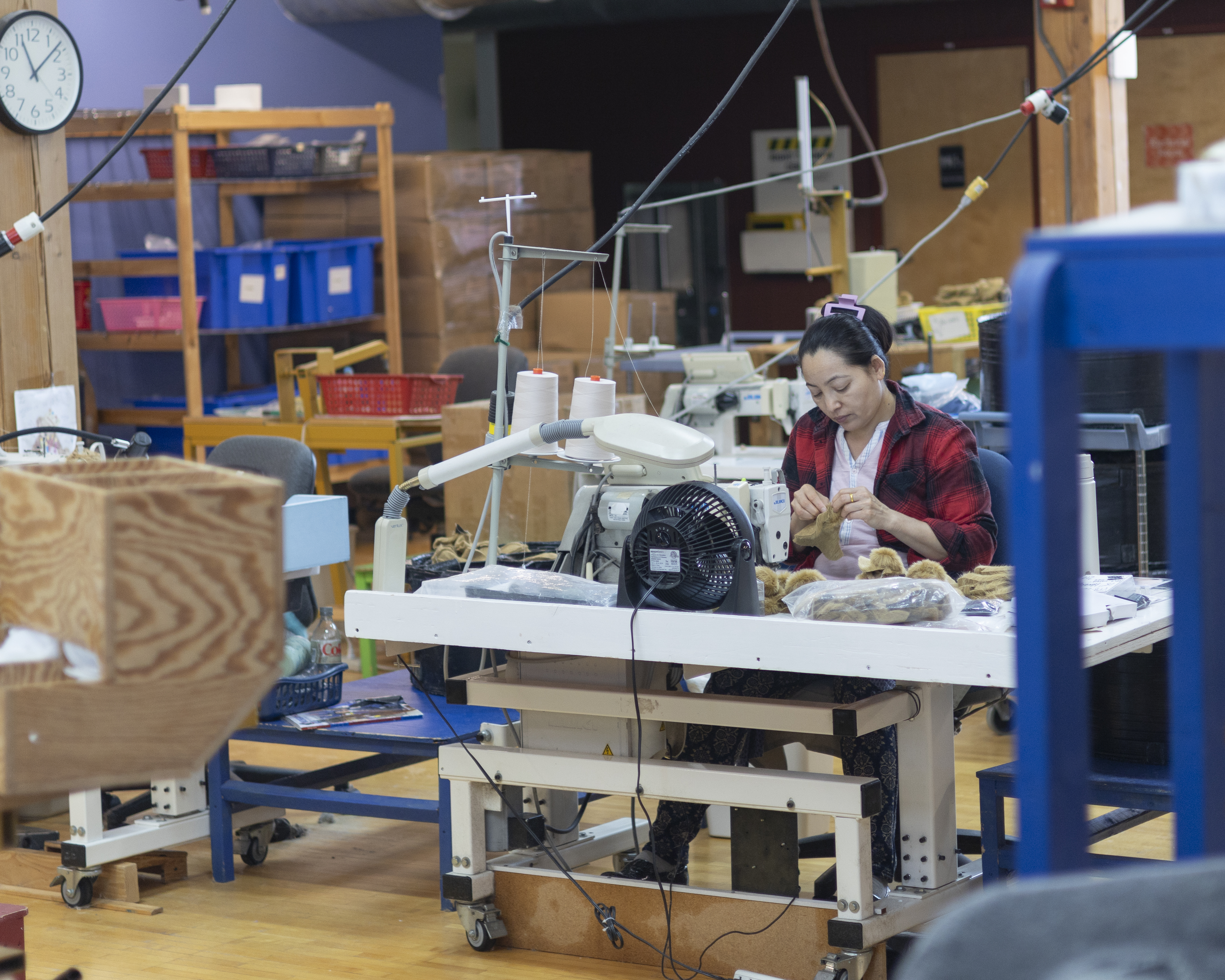
Hand assembly of teddy bear components at the Vermont Teddy Bear factory.

The customer selects the fur, stuffing, and accessories, after which a representative completes the sewing and assists in filling out the bear's "birth certificate." Through the Vermont Cub Project, founded in 2017, the company offers coupons for Vermonters four years of age to make a free Vermont Teddy Bear.

== Product Lines ==
Vermont Teddy Bear has a wide product range of over 300+ items, the most popular being the 15" Jointed Bears in honey color.

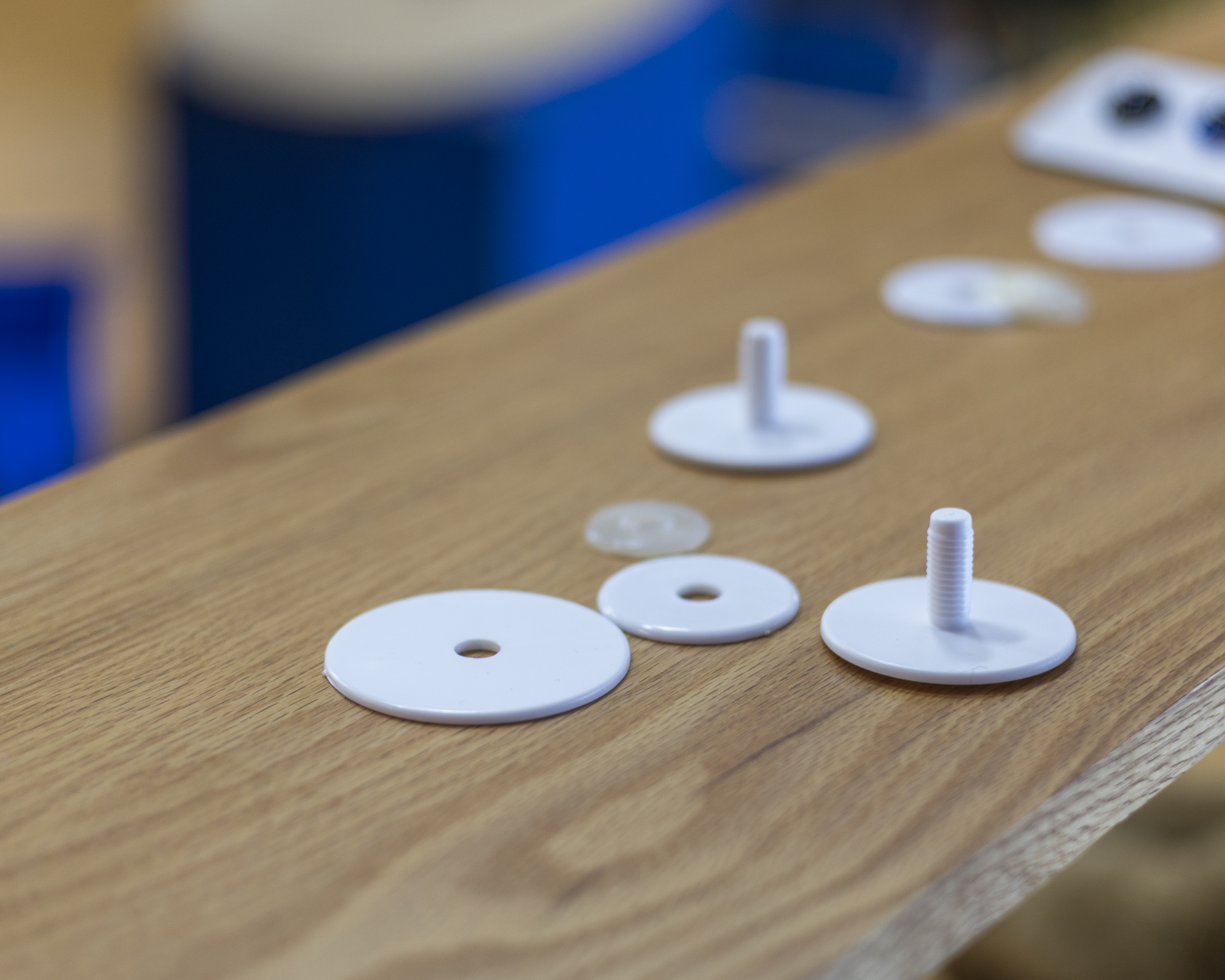
Plastic internal components used to create articulated joints in Vermont Teddy Bear Company bears.

The bears can also come in Buttercream, Vanilla, Black Licorice, Gray, Pink, as well as longer premium fur colors Maple, Espresso and Snow. VTB also has a wide range of outfits available for most occasions and events. They recently have started carrying a variety of other animals including sloths, monkeys, and dragons.

The Vermont Teddy Bear product line is under guarantee by the Vermont Teddy Bear Company. Meaning that if you own a Vermont Teddy Company Bear it is registered on their website, after filling out a form, when sent to the Vermont Teddy Bear Factory they shall attempt to repair it at no cost. However if your product is too badly damaged, they will replace your Bear with a new one instead.

In addition to the regular teddy bears they also release limited edition bears with a very small quantity produced usually in editions of 35 or 50.

== Advertising ==
VTB was listed among "'a broad range of direct marketers' pitched by the show's hosts themselves" who were taking out more ads on talk radio in 2010, according to Dan Metter, director of talk-radio sales of Premiere Radio Networks.
