= University Mall (Vermont) =

Coordinates: 44.465825°N 73.183794°W

- Location: South Burlington, Vermont, United States
- Opened: 1979
- Manager: KeyPoint Partners, LLC
- Num. of stores: 77
- Num. of anchor tenants: 3 (1 vacant)
- Floor area: 610,693 square feet (56,735 m^{2})
- Floors: 1 (, 4 in Parking Garage, staff mezzanine in JCPenney)
- Parking: Parking Garage outside former Sears, rest is uncovered
- Website: https://www.umallvt.com/

The University Mall, often referred to as the U-Mall, is an enclosed shopping mall in South Burlington, Vermont. The name refers to its proximity to the University of Vermont. At 610,693 square feet (56,735 m^{2}), it is the largest shopping mall in Vermont and is the only enclosed mall in the entire state in general and the Burlington metropolitan area in particular following the closure of CityPlace Burlington in 2022. JCPenney, Kohl's, and Target are the anchor stores. It also features an H&M. The mall encompasses 77 shops, including two sit-down restaurants, and a food court. KeyPoint Partners, LLC of Burlington, Massachusetts is the mall's management company.

== History ==
Construction of the University Mall was completed in 1979. Original anchors were Almy's and Zayre. Zayre relocated to a freestanding store in the mall in 1987 and an expansion took over the old Zayre in 1989 connecting the new Zayre. Zayre was rebranded as Ames the same year. Almy's closed in 1987 and became Steinbach in 1992. The mall got a second expansion in 1992 with JCPenney becoming the third anchor. The mall got a third expansion in 1998 with a 2-story Sears becoming the fourth anchor, plus a 4-story parking garage. Steinbach closed in 1999 and became The Bon-Ton the same year. Ames closed in 2002 following their Chapter 7 bankruptcy and became Kohl's in April 2004. The mall was renovated in 2005.

On October 18, 2017, it was announced that regional division The Bon-Ton would be closing in January 2018.

On October 19, 2017, Target announced that they will be opening a small-format store and their first store in Vermont in the former Bon-Ton on October 19, 2018.

On November 7, 2019, it was announced Sears would be closing.

== Operations ==
The rental per square foot is proprietary information. Average pro-rata tax payment for a non-anchor store is about $2 per 1 square foot (0.093 m^{2}).

As of January 2015, mall management reported that the mall was fully tenanted with the exception of two food court spaces. As of September 2026, there are several vacancies in the mall, including the former flagship location formerly occupied by Sears. Most of the food court has been demolished and converted into a wall.

== Tenants ==
The University Mall has an array of stores. Various national retailers have their only Burlington, Vermont area store within the mall, including the three current anchor stores. In 2009, Vermont's first International House of Pancakes opened here, becoming the mall's second sit-down restaurant. There is also a mostly vacant food court with two restaurants in the center of the mall. On September 29, 2024, IHOP closed this location leaving Vermont the only state in the nation without an International House of Pancakes.
