= Green Mountain Transit Authority =

Public transportation agency in central Vermont, US

Green Mountain Transit Agency

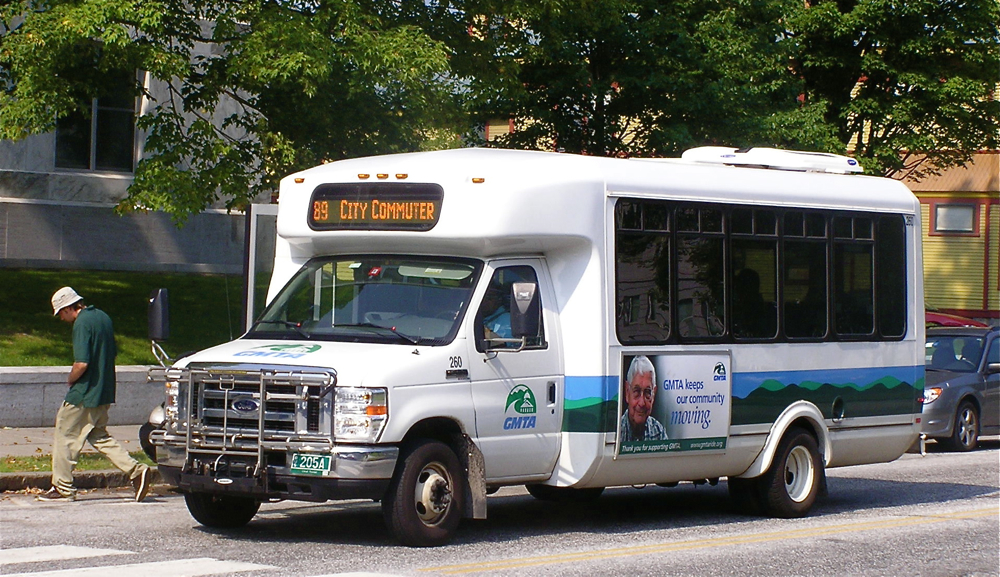
- GMTA bus in Montpelier
- Founded: 2003
- Defunct: 2011
- Service area: Northwestern and central Vermont
- Service type: bus service, paratransit
- Alliance: Chittenden County Transportation Authority
- Fleet: 73
- Daily ridership: 290,000 annually in fiscal year 2010
- Operator: Chittenden County Transportation Authority

Green Mountain Transit Agency (GMTA) was a public transportation provider in central Vermont, specifically in Washington and Lamoille counties and parts of Orange County, expanding in 2009 to include Franklin and Grand Isle counties. Their bus routes connected the Capital District, Stowe, Lamoille Valley and the Mad River Valley.

GMTA had an annual ridership of 290,000 in fiscal year 2010, an average of 795 riders, 34 people per route, daily. There were 73 vehicles in their fleet, all of which have bike racks and are wheelchair accessible.

GMTA was formed by Chittenden County Transportation Authority (CCTA) to run buses following the bankruptcy of Wheels Transportation Inc. in 2003. It was later merged back into CCTA in 2011.

On January 22, 2016, it was announced that the CCTA would be renamed to Green Mountain Transit, completing the merger with GMTA to become a regional system. As of October 2016, the merger has been completed.

== Route list ==
- 79 CVMC Barre Health Shuttle
- 80 City Route Mid-day
- 81 Barre/Hospital Hill
- 82 Montpelier/Hospital Hill
- 83 Waterbury Commuter
- 84 US 2 Commuter
- 85 Hannaford Shopping Shuttle
- 86 Montpelier Link Express
- 87 Northfield Community Shuttle
- 88 Capital Shuttle
- 89 City Commuter
- 90 Health Center in Plainfield Shuttle
- 91 Barre Hospital Hill Demand Response
- 92 Montpelier Circulator
- 93 Northfield Commuter
- 96 St. Albans LINK Express (CCTA)
- 100 Route 100 Commuter
- 101 Mountain Road Shuttle
- 102 Morrisville Loop
- 103 Morrisville Shopping Shuttle
- 109 Price Chopper Shopping Shuttle
- 110 St. Albans Downtown Shuttle
- 115 Alburgh / Georgia Commuter
- 116 Richford / St. Albans Commuter
- 120 Valley Floor
- 121 Valley Evening Service
- 122 Mount Ellen
- 124 Mountain Condos
- 125 Access Road
- 126 SnowCap Commuter

== Fares ==
50% discount fares were available to children ages 6 through 17, seniors at and over the age of 60, and disabled passengers. LINK Express riders were not eligible for any discounts when riding such buses. Local fares were $1.00, except for Franklin and Grand Isle, where they were $0.50.
