= Advance Transit =

Public transportation provider in Vermont and New Hampshire, US

- Founded: 1984
- Headquarters: Wilder, Vermont
- Locale: The Upper Connecticut River Valley - Lebanon, Hanover, Enfield, and Canaan in New Hampshire and Hartford and Norwich in Vermont.
- Service area: eastern Windsor County, Vermont and southwestern Grafton County, New Hampshire
- Service type: bus service, paratransit
- Routes: 9
- Stops: Dartmouth College; Dartmouth–Hitchcock Medical Center
- Fleet: 27 buses, 8 cutaway buses, 3 service vehicles
- Annual ridership: 581,293 (VT/NH fixed routes only, 2018)
- Fuel type: Electric, Diesel, Diesel-electric Hybrid, and Gasoline
- Website: www.advancetransit.com

Advance Transit is the main public transportation provider for eastern Windsor County and southwestern Grafton County in southeastern Vermont and western New Hampshire, respectively. Local bus routes are provided between the Dartmouth–Hitchcock Medical Center, Dartmouth College, the city of Lebanon, New Hampshire, and the towns of Hanover, New Hampshire, and Hartford, Vermont, including the unincorporated village of White River Junction.

Advance Transit was created in 1981 following the failure of the for-profit Tri-Town Bus Company. In 1977 the Upper Valley Lake Sunapee Council (now the Upper Valley Lake Sunapee Regional Planning Commission) completed a Transit Development Plan for a non-profit public transportation system covering a larger service area. The Plan was endorsed by the State of New Hampshire, and Advance Transit was then formed as a program of the Upper Valley Senior Citizens Council. In 1984 Advance Transit incorporated as a separate non-profit entity.

All routes have been fare free since 2003. Service is provided on all routes on weekdays, and the Blue, Red, Orange, and Green routes operate on Saturdays. Trip planning via Advance Transit is available on Google Maps.

== Route list ==
(Information is current as of October 2, 2023)

- Blue Route
- Red Route
- Orange Route
- Green Route
- Brown Route
- Yellow Route
- Dartmouth-Hanover Shuttle
- Lot 20 Shuttle
- Enfield-Canaan Commuter

Advance Transit also operates a free, on-demand weekday and Saturday paratransit service called ACCESS AT.
