= Southeast Vermont Transit =

Bus company in Vermont, United States

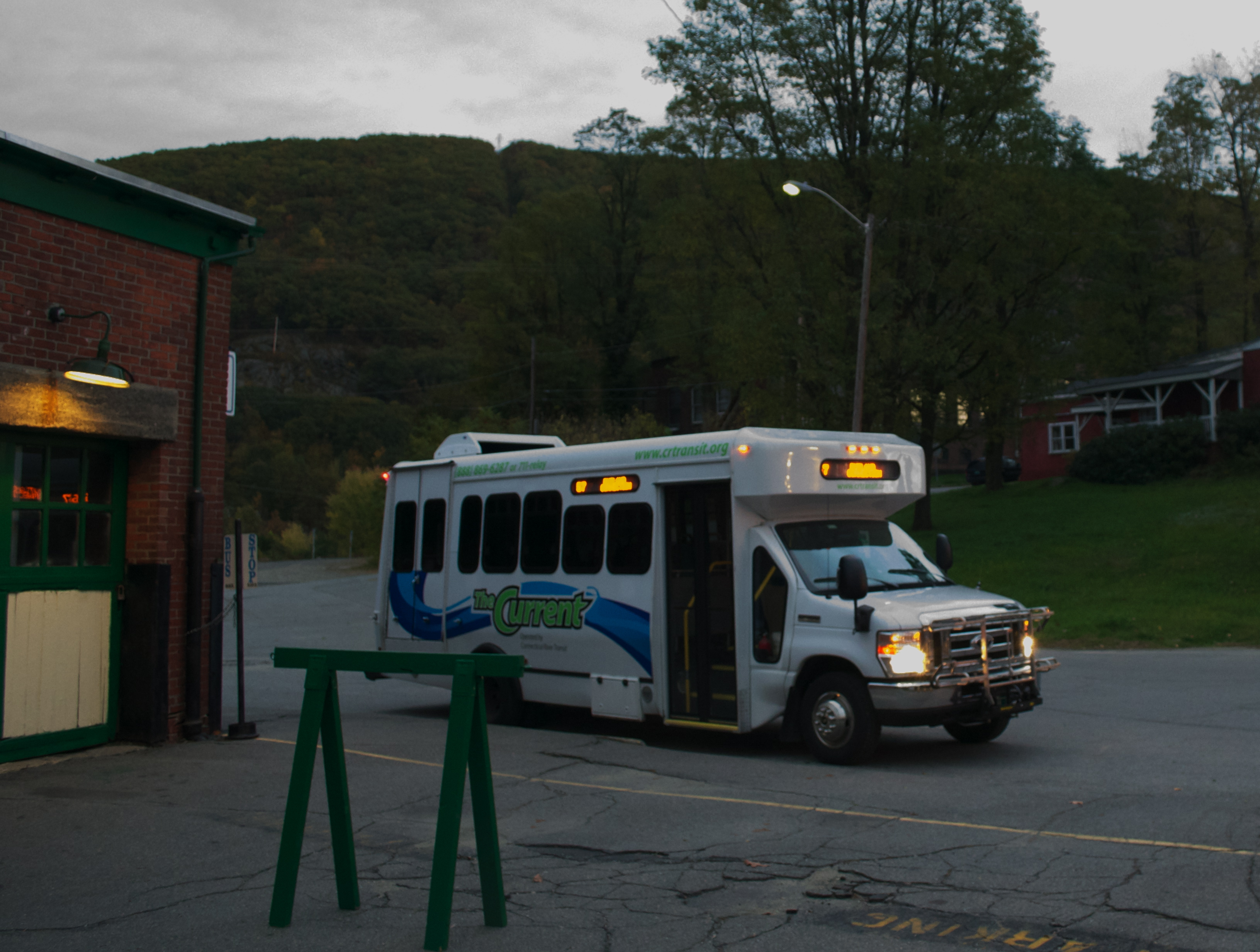
- A route 57 The Current bus in Bellows Falls in 2011
- Founded: 2015
- Headquarters: 45 Mill Street, Wilmington, Vermont
- Service area: Windham County, Windsor County, and Bennington County, Vermont; small parts of Grafton County and Cheshire County, New Hampshire
- Service type: Circulator, local, regional, and commuter bus
- Routes: 20
- Hubs: Battleboro Transportation Center
- Fleet: 44
- Annual ridership: 308,932
- Website: https://www.moover.com/

Southeast Vermont Transit (SEVT) is a local bus operator serving Windham County, Vermont, southern Windsor County, and parts of southern Bennington County. Three Brattleboro local routes and ten regional routes to the north are branded as Rockingham MOOver; five regional routes and eight ski resort circulator routes to the west are branded as Wilmington MOOver. The agency was formed in July 2015 by the merger of the Deerfield Valley Transit Association (DVTA) and Connecticut River Transit (CRT).

== History ==
The Deerfield Valley Transit Association (DVTA) was formed in mid-1996 as a 501(c)(3) non-profit organization to provide bus service to condos at Mount Snow. The service was branded as "MOOver", with buses painted to resemble Holstein cows. Operation began in November 1996; on December 20, 1999, the system was expanded to serve Readsboro, Wardsboro, East Dover, and Whitingham.

In 2003, Town and Village Bus, which operated the Beeline local bus service in Brattleboro and several regional routes, went out of business. The DVTA was contracted to temporarily operate the routes; the town began operating the Beeline later that year, while the regional routes were transferred to the newly-formed Connecticut River Transit (CRT) nonprofit. The DVTA began operating service between Wilmington and Brattleboro on October 19, 2004.

In late 2010, CRT took over the Beeline system from the town. Construction of a DVTA maintenance facility in Wilmington, first planned in 2002, began in April 2014 and was completed in 2015. In September 2013, the DVTA began managing the CRT service. On September 6, 2014, the two operators announced plans to merge into Southeast Vermont Transit. The process, under which CRT was dissolved and its assets transferred to DVTA, was completed on July 1, 2015. The former DVTA routes retained the MOOver brand, while the former CRT routes retained their branding as The Current. On January 22, 2020, Southeast Vermont Transit announced that it was ending the branding of CRT routes as The Current and was consolidating them into the MOOver brand. After 14 months of consolidation, Southeast Vermont Transit fully merged these two brands on April 1, 2021. The original MOOver brand routes were now called Wilmington MOOver while the former The Current routes were called Rockingham MOOver.

== Service ==
=== Wilmington MOOver ===
MOOver runs five year-round services, which serve the Deerfield Valley primarily along the Route 9 and Route 100 corridors:

- 7: Wilmington - West Dover
- 8: West Dover - Old School Community Centre, Wilmington (School days only)
- 9: Wilmington - Readsboro
- 10: Wilmington - Brattleboro
- 13: Wilmington - Bennington

Eight circulator routes are operated during the winter ski season to serve the areas around the Mount Snow resort. All MOOver routes are fare free.

- 1: Mount Snow Base Area
- 1A: Snow Mountain Village, Upper SnowTree, The Outlook
- 2: Timber Creek
- 3: Greenspring
- 4: Bears Crossing & Suntec
- 5: Kingswood
- 11: Upper Parking Lots
- 12: Lower Parking Lots

=== Rockingham MOOVer ===
Rockingham MOOVer operates six local and regional routes, primarily along Route 5 in the Connecticut River Valley, and along Route 11 and Route 103 to the west:

- 1: Springfield In-Town
- 2: Bellows Falls In-Town
- 53: Bellows Falls / Brattleboro Commuter
- 55: Bellows Falls / Springfield Shuttle
- 57: Bellows Falls to Rutland Connector
- 61: Bellows Falls – Okemo Shuttle

Three additional express routes serve the Upper Valley area primarily along I-91, including Hanover and Lebanon, New Hampshire:

- 71: DHMC Express #1
- 72: DHMC Express #2
- 73: Dartmouth College Express #1

Three local circulator routes - Blue, Red, and White and numbered 4,5 and 7 - serve Brattleboro and surrounding towns, including Hinsdale, New Hampshire. All MOOver routes are fare free; route 61 is seasonal. Finally Route 101 operates from Chester to Springfield to Claremont two days in the month. Rockingham MOOVer also operates dial-a-ride service. The Current operations facility is in Rockingham north of Bellows Falls.
