= Tri-Valley Transit =

Bus operator in central Vermont

Tri-Valley Transit (TVT)
- Founded: 2017
- Locale: Central Vermont
- Service area: Addison, Orange and north Windsor counties, Vermont and express service to adjacent counties
- Service type: bus service, paratransit, express bus service
- Routes: 6 (3 local, 3 between-town commuters)
- Destinations: Middlebury, Vergennes, Bristol, and express service to Rutland, Burlington, Randolph, Bethel, Bradford, White River Junction, and Hanover
- Hubs: 2 (Academy Street in downtown Middlebury and L Street in Randolph)
- Fleet: 20
- Annual ridership: 158,302 (2022)
- Chief executive: Jim Moulton
- Website: trivalleytransit.org

Tri-Valley Transit (formerly ACTR and Stagecoach) is the public transportation provider primarily serving Addison, Orange, and north Windsor Counties in central Vermont.

TVT became a 501(c)(3) incorporation in 2017 as the unification of Addison County Transit Resources (ACTR) of Addison County, Vermont, and Stagecoach Transportation Inc. (Stagecoach) of Orange and Northern Windsor Counties, Vermont. Stagecoach was founded in 1976 and ACTR in 1992. In 2019, TVT provided more than 268,000 rides.

== History ==
In the early days, services focused on elderly residents and were provided by volunteers. Today TVT offers a fixed-route bus system and Dial-A-Ride paratransit services for vulnerable residents who cannot access the bus system. Beginning in 2002, ACTR expanded its bus routes and Dial-A-Ride capacity, growing ridership from 68,000 to more than 174,000 in 2019 and built the Addison County Community Transportation Center in order to meet future community transportation needs.

In 2014, Vermont Agency of Transportation (VTrans) asked ACTR leadership to enter into a management agreement with Stagecoach after its executive director stepped down. Stagecoach was in crisis – facing bankruptcy and potential closure. During the three-year management agreement with ACTR, Stagecoach’s debt was paid off, it regained its status as the regional Medicaid Non-Emergency Medical trip provider, general public services were expanded, and community impact nearly doubled (from 61,400 rides in 2014 to nearly 112,600 in 2019). ACTR also benefitted by gaining shared staff, operational efficiencies and cost savings, and a deeper organizational foundation. In 2017, with the management agreement set to expire, the two Boards of Directors decided to merge the two agencies to improve economies of scale and administrative efficiency. Both divisions continued to operate under their original local branding until the Tri-Valley Transit logo was introduced in 2020.

== Services ==
TVT's Shuttle Bus routes operate 7 days-a-week providing 167,000 rides annually. Every bus in the fleet is equipped with a wheelchair lift, two built-in child seats, seat belts and bike-carrying racks.

Dial-A-Ride programs provide more than 119,000 annual rides to elders, persons with disabilities and Medicaid members. They serve people in more remote towns where Shuttle Buses are not cost efficient. Volunteer drivers use their own vehicles to provide rides. While most trips are provided in-county, they also bring passengers to medical specialists across the state and even occasionally as far as Boston or New York City. In FY2019 the Dial-A-Ride System provided 65,500 rides to Medicaid recipients and nearly 83,400 rides to the elderly and disabled. 81% of trips are to medical facilities, 16% to grocery stores or meal sites and 3% elsewhere.
