= Zerah Colburn =

Zerah Colburn may refer to:

- Zerah Colburn (mental calculator) (1804–1839), American mathematics prodigy
- Zerah Colburn (engineer and writer) (1832–1870), American engineer, journalist and author
