= Mary Eastman =

Mary Eastman may refer to:

- Mary Eastman (singer), American singer
- Mary Eastman Ward (1843–1907), American poet
- Mary F. Eastman (1833–1908), American educator, lecturer, writer, suffragist
- Mary Henderson Eastman (1818–1887), American writer on Native American life
