= InnerCity Weightlifting =

Not-for-profit gym

- Founded: 2010
- Founder: Jon Feinman
- Location(s): Boston, Massachusetts and in Cambridge, Massachusetts
- Website: www.innercityweightlifting.org

InnerCity Weightlifting (ICW) is a 501(c) non-profit organization founded in Boston, Massachusetts. The organization originated as a gym, that wanted to keep youth off the streets, and now is as well a source of education, job-training, and employment in personal training for young people who have been imprisoned and/or connected to street gangs.

ICW focuses on working with the young people characterized as the highest risk population in Boston for violence.

== History ==
InnerCity Weightlifting was founded in 2010 by Jon Feinman. Feinman has a background in Olympic weightlifting and personal training.

In 2015, ICW expanded into a second location in Kendall Square, Cambridge. ICW's second location is designed as a fitness studio where its most devoted student trainers earn a living by training several clients a week, and traveling to nearby offices for corporate workout sessions.

== Services ==
ICW offers numerous services.

- Educational services such as GED tutoring
- Finding safe affordable housing
- Job placement and training

== Impact ==
Innercity Weightlifting has engaged with 150 "high risk students" and has seen a 78% reduction in student trainer arrests after joining ICW. Many students of ICW have celebrated record periods out of prison.

== Personal training ==
ICW offers an apprenticeship program that primes its most dedicated students for a career in personal training. ICW opened a second location in Kendall Square, Cambridge in 2015 with the goal of improving the economic and social mobility of its student trainers. In Kendall Square, student trainers are able to take on clients, and travel to nearby offices to train corporate employees.

== Media and recognition ==
InnerCity Weightlifting has been featured in articles from The Huffington Post, The Boston Globe, Boston Magazine, and has been featured in video segments of the CBS Evening News, ESPN's SportsCenter, New England Sports Network, and ABC News.

Additionally, ICW has received various local and national awards from the Boston Celtics, Babson College, Year Up, Good Sports, Cabot Creamery, and Anytime Fitness. Founder Jon Feinman was named one of the Greater Boston Chamber of Commerce 2014 Ten Outstanding Young Leaders, and was named a 2012 Social Innovator by Social Innovation Forum, Ernst & Young Social Entrepreneur of the Year; ICW won the 19th annual Rosoff Award for workplace diversity.
