= Danville, Vermont =

- Town
- Danville, Vermont, from the southeast
- Nickname: "Village in the hills"
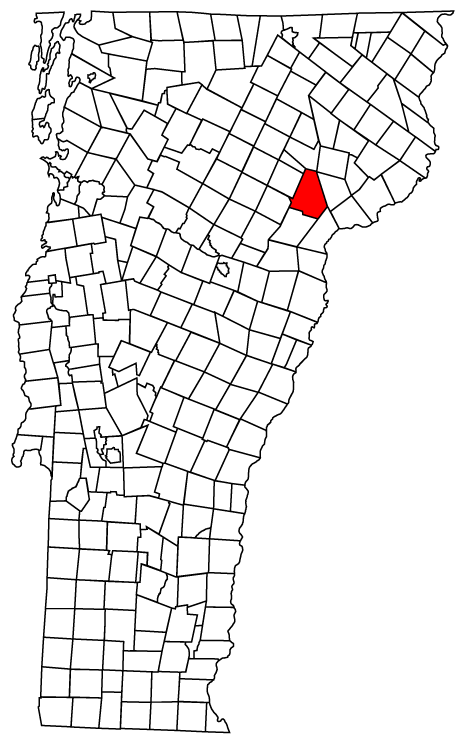
- Danville, Vermont
- Coordinates: 44°26′10″N 72°07′22″W
- Country: United States
- State: Vermont
- County: Caledonia
- Established: October 31, 1786 (chartered)
- Communities: Danville; Danville Center; North Danville; Upper Narrows; West Danville

Area
  - Total: 61.1 sq mi (158.3 km^{2})
  - Land: 60.7 sq mi (157.3 km^{2})
  - Water: 0.42 sq mi (1.1 km^{2})
- Elevation: 1,335 ft (407 m)

Population (2020)
  - Total: 2,335
  - Density: 38/sq mi (14.8/km^{2})
- Time zone: UTC-5 (Eastern (EST))
  - Summer (DST): UTC-4 (EDT)
- ZIP codes: 05828 (Danville); 05873 (West Danville); 05819 (St. Johnsbury)
- Area code: 802
- FIPS code: 50-17125
- GNIS feature ID: 1462080
- Website: danvillevermont.org

Danville is a town in Caledonia County, Vermont, United States. The population was 2,335 at the 2020 census. The primary settlement in town is recorded as the Danville census-designated place (CDP) and had a population of 385 at the 2020 census.

== History ==
Danville was established on October 31, 1786, by the Vermont Legislature, making it one of the last towns to be created in Caledonia County.

The town was named for the 18th-century French cartographer Jean Baptiste Bourguignon d'Anville.

A debtors' prison was located here in the late 18th to the early 19th centuries.

A thief in West Danville made national news in 2008 when he apologized for robbing a convenience store and left a roll of one-dollar bills to allow the store to open up the next morning.

The annual convention of the American Society of Dowsers is held in Danville.

In July 2017, the Charles D. Brainerd Public Library reopened in the village of West Danville, making the town once again home to Vermont's smallest library.

== Education ==
Danville School is the town's public school but is open to tuition students from surrounding towns. It serves preschool through grade 12, totaling approximately 400 students. The school is located at 148 Peacham Road, Danville, Vermont 05828 and is a part of the Danville School District. The school was established in 1990 to replace the North Danville School.

== Geography ==
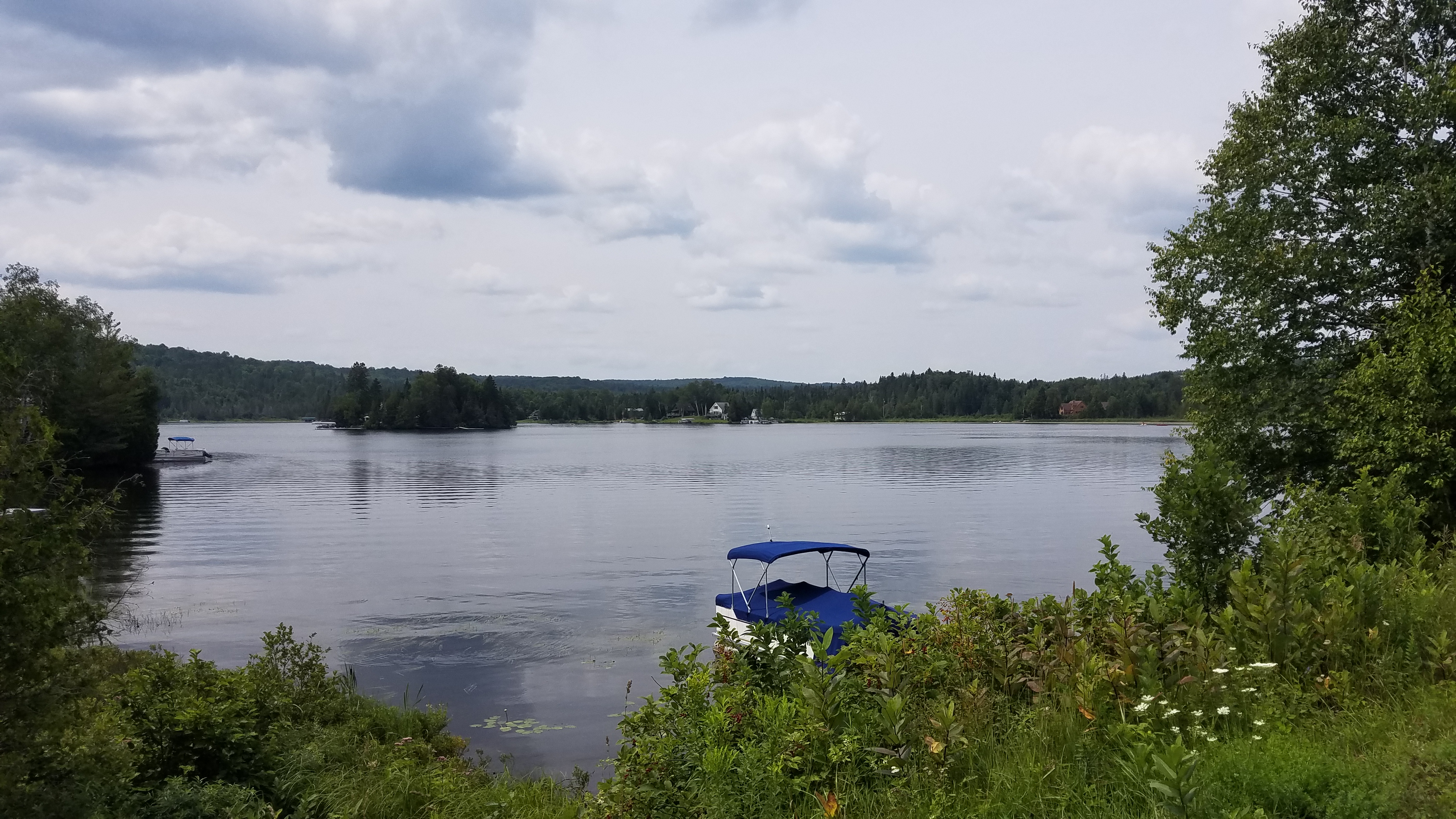
Joe's Pond as seen from the Danville Bike Path in early August

Danville is located west of St. Johnsbury, Vermont. Other towns bordering Danville are Barnet to the southeast, Peacham to the south, Cabot and Walden to the west, Stannard to the northwest, Wheelock to the north, and Lyndon to the northeast, touching Danville at a single corner. According to the United States Census Bureau, the town has a total area of 61.1 square miles (158.3 km^{2}), of which 60.7 square miles (157.3 km^{2}) is land and 0.42 square miles (1.1 km^{2}), or 0.67%, is water. The main village in town (not separately incorporated) comprises the Danville CDP, with an area of 1.0 square mile (2.7 km^{2}), all land.

U.S. Route 2 runs through the town, connecting St. Johnsbury to the east with Montpelier 26 miles (42 km) to the west. In West Danville the two-lane highway passes Joes Pond (named after Indian Joe), which extends into Cabot. Vermont Route 15 leaves US-2 in West Danville, heading northwest towards Hardwick and Morrisville.

The highest point in Danville is a 2,365-foot (721 m) summit on the ridge of the Kittredge Hills along the western border of the town.

=== Climate ===
This climatic region is typified by large seasonal temperature differences, with warm to hot summers and cold winters. According to the Köppen Climate Classification system, Danville has a humid continental climate, abbreviated "Dfb" on climate maps.

== Joe's Pond and Joe's Brook ==
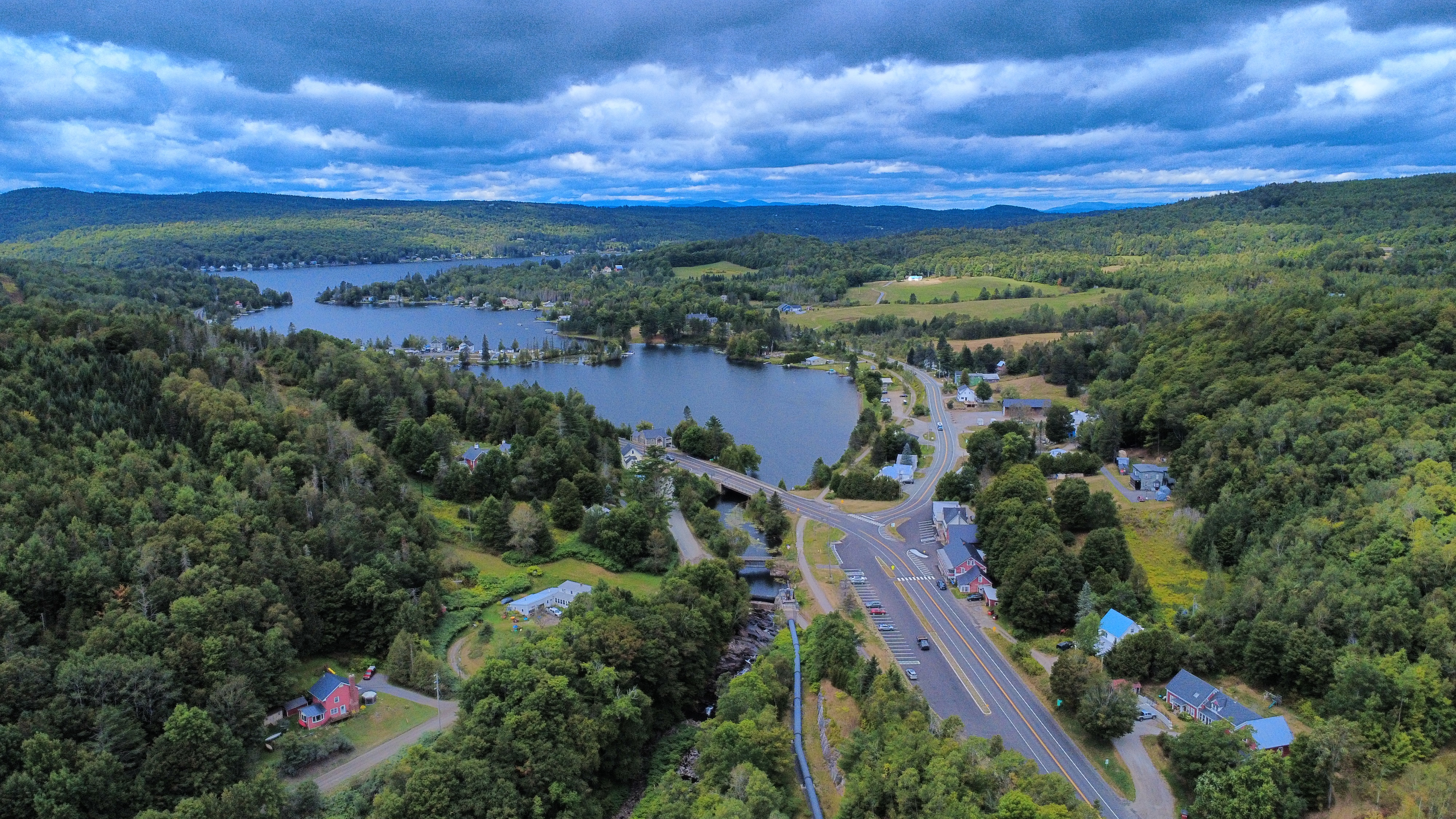
West Danville and Joe's Pond, VT, from the east

The only major body of water in the town is the Joe's Pond, which covers 396 acres (160 ha) and is partially in Danville and partially in neighboring Cabot to the west. The pond, an impoundment of the brook in West Danville, is the largest of the six bodies of water in the Joe's Brook watershed, which is in turn part of the Passumpsic River watershed. Game fish in the pond include lake trout, smallmouth bass, northern pike (which were illegally introduced), rainbow smelt, rock bass, pumpkinseed, chain pickerel, yellow perch, and brown bullhead. Plant species in the pond include the common mare's tail (Hippuris vulgaris) and the small bur-reed (Sparganium natans).

The Greenbanks Hollow Covered Bridge, one of Vermont's many covered bridges, traverses Joe's Brook and lies within the Danville town boundaries. The covered bridge was built in 1886 and restored in its original condition in the early 2000s. The bridge is owned by the Town of Danville, has a queen post truss, and is 74 feet, 9.5 inches in length and 14 feet, 6.5 inches in width.

== Demographics ==
Historical population
Census	Pop.	Note	%±
1790	574		—
1800	1,514		163.8%
1810	2,240		48.0%
1820	2,300		2.7%
1830	2,631		14.4%
1840	2,633		0.1%
1850	2,577		−2.1%
1860	2,544		−1.3%
1870	2,216		−12.9%
1880	2,003		−9.6%
1890	1,784		−10.9%
1900	1,628		−8.7%
1910	1,564		−3.9%
1920	1,494		−4.5%
1930	1,600		7.1%
1940	1,472		−8.0%
1950	1,312		−10.9%
1960	1,368		4.3%
1970	1,405		2.7%
1980	1,705		21.4%
1990	1,917		12.4%
2000	2,211		15.3%
2010	2,196		−0.7%
2020	2,335		6.3%
U.S. Decennial Census

According to the U.S. census of 2000, there were 2,211 people, 871 households, and 627 families residing in Danville. The population density was 36.3 people per square mile (14.0/km^{2}). There were 1,152 housing units at an average density of 18.9 per square mile (7.3/km^{2}). The racial makeup of the town was 99.10% White, 0.18% African American, 0.23% Native American, 0.14% Asian, and 0.36% from two or more races. Hispanic or Latino of any race were 0.45% of the population.

There were 871 households, out of which 32.5% had children under the age of 18 living with them, 62.0% were married couples living together, 8.2% had a female householder with no husband present, and 28.0% were non-families. 23.1% of all households were made up of individuals, and 10.6% had someone living alone who was 65 years of age or older. The average household size was 2.52 and the average family size was 2.96.

In the town, the population was spread out, with 26.1% under the age of 18, 4.5% from 18 to 24, 25.4% from 25 to 44, 28.9% from 45 to 64, and 15.1% who were 65 years of age or older. The median age was 41 years. For every 100 females, there were 91.3 males. For every 100 females age 18 and over, there were 89.8 males.

The median income for a household in the town was $42,440, and the median income for a family was $47,150. Males had a median income of $33,654 versus $21,573 for females. The per capita income for the town was $19,012. About 6.2% of families and 8.3% of the population were below the federal poverty line, including 11.3% of those under age 18 and 6.1% of those age 65 or over.

== Notable people ==
- Jere A. Blount, Wisconsin State Assemblyman
- Asa P. Blunt (1835–1889), 12th Regular Vermont Infantry Volunteers; Brigadier General U.S.V
- Beth Chamberlin, Daytime Emmy Award nominated star of "Guiding Light"
- Arthur M. Chickering, arachnologist
- Augustine Clarke, Anti-Masonic Party leader and Vermont State Treasurer
- Charles Davis (1789–1863), Associate Justice of the Vermont Supreme Court
- Benjamin F. Deming, U.S. Representative from Vermont
- Henry Leavenworth, early U.S. infantry officer and explorer
- Charles Mattocks, Civil War POW and Medal of Honor recipient
- Cyrus Miner, Wisconsin state legislator and businessman
- William A. Palmer, Governor of Vermont and United States Senator
- Thaddeus Stevens, U.S. congressman from Pennsylvania
- Mary Eastman Ward (1843–1907), poet
- Mary Thompson Hill Willard (1805–1892), social reformer

== See also ==
- Danville, Quebec, founded by residents of Danville, Vermont
