= Cabot (CDP), Vermont =

Census-designated place in Vermont, United States

Cabot, Vermont
- Census-designated place
- Location in Washington County and the state of Vermont
- Coordinates: 44°24′20″N 72°18′44″W
- Country: United States
- State: Vermont
- County: Washington
- Town: Cabot

Area
  - Total: 1.1 sq mi (2.9 km^{2})
  - Land: 1.1 sq mi (2.9 km^{2})
  - Water: 0 sq mi (0.0 km^{2})
- Elevation: 1,073 ft (327 m)

Population (2020)
  - Total: 235
  - Density: 210/sq mi (81/km^{2})
- Time zone: UTC-5 (Eastern (EST))
  - Summer (DST): UTC-4 (EDT)
- ZIP code: 05647
- Area code: 802
- FIPS code: 50-11050
- GNIS feature ID: 2729388

Cabot is an unincorporated village and census-designated place (CDP) in the town of Cabot in Washington County, Vermont, United States. The population was 235 at the 2020 census. Cabot Village contains a general store, hardware store, gas station, post office, public school (Pre-K through 12), restaurant, a fraternal hall, and a church. Formerly an incorporated village, Cabot disincorporated at the end of 2010 and reverted to the town of Cabot.

== Geography ==
According to the United States Census Bureau, the village has a total area of 1.1 square miles (2.9 km^{2}), all land.

== Demographics ==
As of the census of 2000, there were 239 people, 91 households, and 65 families residing in the village. The population density was 212.2 people per square mile (81.7/km^{2}). There were 95 housing units at an average density of 84.4/sq mi (32.5/km^{2}). The racial makeup of the village was 92.47% White, 0.42% Black or African American, 0.84% from other races, and 6.28% from two or more races. Hispanic or Latino of any race were 0.42% of the population.

There were 91 households, out of which 40.7% had children under the age of 18 living with them, 52.7% were married couples living together, 16.5% had a female householder with no husband present, and 27.5% were non-families. 25.3% of all households were made up of individuals, and 5.5% had someone living alone who was 65 years of age or older. The average household size was 2.63 and the average family size was 3.05.

In the village, the population was spread out, with 32.2% under the age of 18, 6.7% from 18 to 24, 30.1% from 25 to 44, 20.5% from 45 to 64, and 10.5% who were 65 years of age or older. The median age was 35 years. For every 100 females, there were 94.3 males. For every 100 females age 18 and over, there were 90.6 males.

The median income for a household in the village was $45,417, and the median income for a family was $54,583. Males had a median income of $35,625 versus $25,625 for females. The per capita income for the village was $18,411. About 1.6% of families and 4.9% of the population were below the poverty line, including 7.3% of those under the age of eighteen and none of those 65 or over.

== Industry ==
Cabot is well known as the home of Cabot Creamery, a farmer's cooperative which makes dairy products, most notably its premium cheddar cheese.
