= Danville (CDP), Vermont =

Census-designated place in Vermont, United States

Danville, Vermont
- Census-designated place
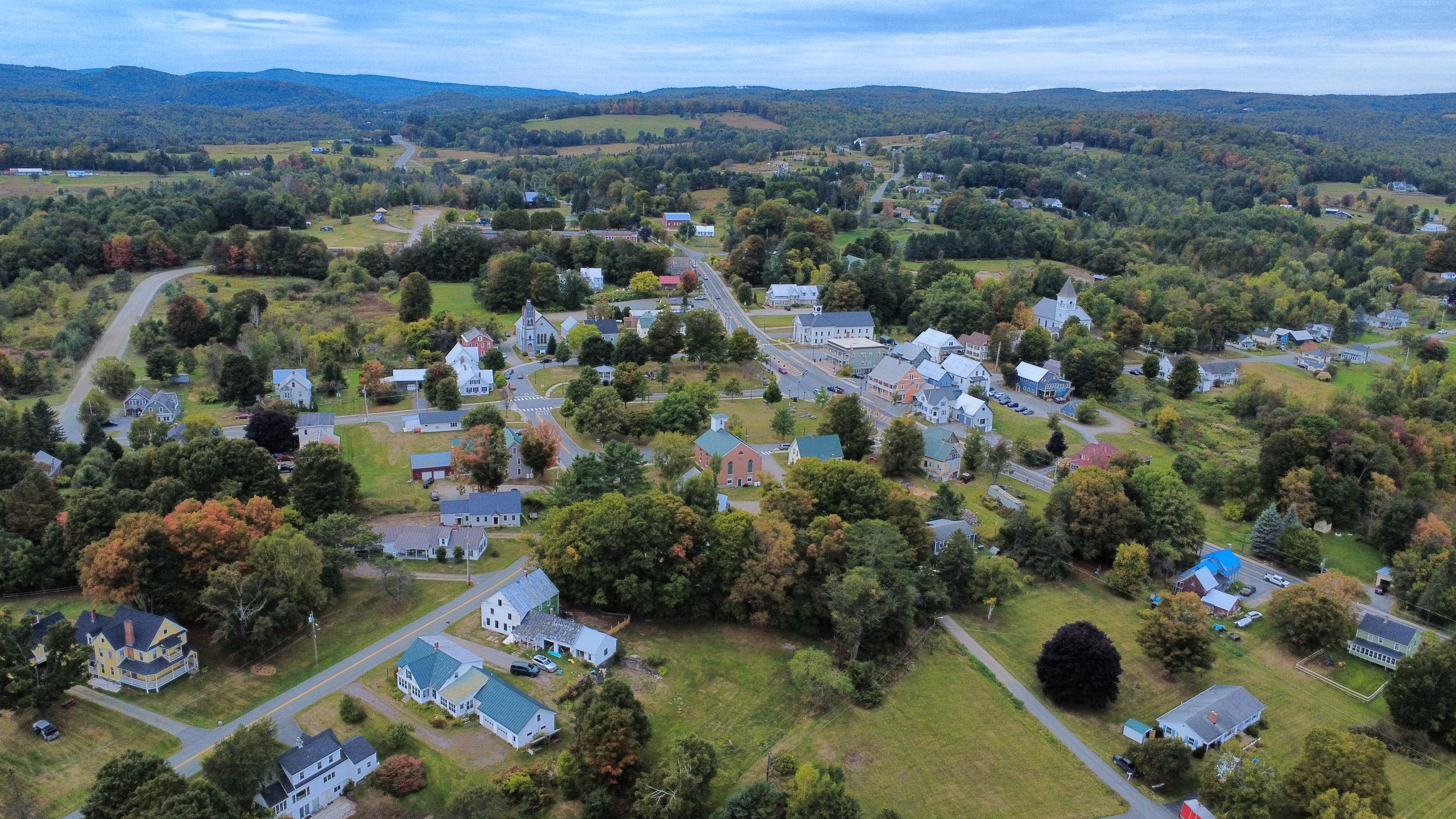
- Danville, Vermont, from the east

- Location within Vermont Location within the United States
- Coordinates: 44°24′38″N 72°08′27″W
- Country: United States
- State: Vermont
- County: Caledonia
- Town: Danville

Area
  - Total: 1.03 sq mi (2.66 km^{2})
  - Land: 1.02 sq mi (2.65 km^{2})
  - Water: 0 sq mi (0.00 km^{2})
- Elevation: 1,424 ft (434 m)

Population (2020)
  - Total: 385
- Time zone: UTC-5 (Eastern (EST))
  - Summer (DST): UTC-4 (EDT)
- ZIP Code: 05828
- Area code: 802
- FIPS code: 50-17050
- GNIS feature ID: 2586626

Danville is the primary village and a census-designated place (CDP) in the town of Danville, Caledonia County, Vermont, United States. As of the 2020 census, the CDP had a population of 385, out of 2,335 in the entire town of Danville.

The village is in west-central Caledonia County, south of the center of the town of Danville. U.S. Route 2 passes through the village, leading east 8 miles (13 km) to St. Johnsbury and southwest 27 miles (43 km) to Montpelier, the state capital. The village drains south to Brown Brook, a tributary of Joes Brook, and east to Water Andric. Joes Brook and Water Andric both flow southeast to the Passumpsic River, a south-flowing tributary of the Connecticut River.
