= Indian Joe =

Native American scout

Connecticut River & Newbury VT / Revolutionary War — Sites of the St. Francis Abenaki and US Continental Army encampments along the Connecticut River dividing Vermont and New Hampshire, including residences of Joseph Susap in Coös territory.

Joseph Susap, Indian Joe (Susap, Capt Jos Indian, Old Joe) was a Mi'kmaq child adopted by the Abenaki following his parents death at the Siege of Louisbourg, 1745. He survived Roger's Raid on St. Francis in 1759. Joseph served under General Jacob Bayley as a scout during the early years of the Revolutionary War. Later he was one of the Indian Rangers in the company commanded by Captain John Vincent, a Caughnawaga Mohawk. He eventually settled in Newbury in Vermont.

== Early life ==
=== Mi'kmaq child orphaned in Siege of Louisbourg, adopted by the Abenaki of St. Francis ===
Joseph was born near Louisbourg, Nova Scotia on Cape Breton Island, to Mi'kmaq parents. When his family was killed during the first British Siege of Louisbourg in May and June of 1745 (King George's War) he was just six years old. Taken by survivors of the raid to St. Francis (now Odanak) he was adopted and raised by the Abenaki. These surviving refugees at St. Francis had no love for the British and participated in raids upon the Colonial villages in northern New England. Sylvia Dodge of the North Star Monthly wrote that Joseph participated in some of these raids and sustained a serious injury near Newbury. The story continues that he was taken in by a settler and nursed back to health, afterwards returning to St. Francis. The original source for this is unknown.

Joseph married Molly, an Abenaki woman who had two sons. The name Joseph (Abenaki pronunciation Susap) was common among Native Wabanaki men, making it difficult to distinguish between them in records. The same can be said for Molly (Mary). These two names show the influence of the Church at the time of their baptisms.

=== Roger's Raid on St. Francis — refugee again ===
On October 4, 1759, the British Army's Major Robert Rogers and his rangers attacked St. Francis in the early morning hours, killing any Abenaki who did not escape before burning their village to the ground.

== St. Francis Indians in Newbury, Vermont ==
After the raid Joseph and Molly fled south, crossing into Vermont where they lived a nomadic life per Dodge. They stopped at several places; Derby, Cabot, Morristown, Peacham, and finally settled in Newbury on the Connecticut River across from Haverhill, New Hampshire. As early as 1765 it was reported that Indians were numerous around Guildhall, Vermont (upper Coös) and again after 1778.

=== Revolutionary War ===
Joseph "the famous scout"^{31} served under General Jacob Bayley who was mapping the Bayley-Hazen Military Road that connected the Connecticut River Valley with Canada; traversing from Newbury, Vermont to St. John's, Quebec near Montréal. Joseph was familiar with the land between Coös and Canada, and his service was valuable.^{131}

"In December of 1776, Jacob Bayley told the Speaker of the New Hampshire House of Representatives that supplying the Saint Francis Indians with trade goods was important and that he had sent an Indian and two men to go to their hunting grounds. They informed the Indians that they could bring their beaver to trade at Upper Cowas, which suggests that the Indians were living and hunting upriver at least north of Newbury." Gordon M. Day, The Identity of the St. Francis Indians pg 54

Washington intended for his army to use the road to invade Canada. General Bayley was in charge of the construction in 1775-1776 after which time work was halted, to be picked up later in 1779 under General Moses Hazen and Colonel Timothy Bedel who continued with its construction into Canada. The Continental Army's invasion never happened and the road was never completed. Ironically, however, it was used at least once by the British to raid Royalton in Vermont. Joseph later served in Captain John Vincent's Company, 1777-1778^{131} and 1780-1781. The earliest primary document attributed to Joseph is the "Muster Roll of Captain John Vincent's Company of Indian Rangers in the Service of the United States of America," 1781. This document lists the names of 16 Abenaki from the St. Francis tribe who enlisted under John Vincent. Of the 13 privates, eight were named Joseph or Susap; what makes historians certain that one of the men is "Indian Joe" is the location of the company, Newbury, and knowing Joe was from Newbury and served in this company. Mudgett points to "Joseph Molly" in that list. There is a historical marker in Mendon, Rutland County, Vermont, commemorating Captain John Vincent:

"Near this location lived "Captain John" Vincent, a member of the Caughnawaga tribe. An admirer of General George Washington, Captain John became a firm friend of the Colonies. He accompanied Benedict Arnold and Richard Montgomery to guide American troops from Cambridge, Massachusetts, to Quebec for the siege on Quebec 1776. He fought with General Gates at the Battle of Saratoga, where Burgoyne surrendered his British forces. After the Revolutionary War he settled in Mendon. Captain John died on July 3, 1810, at the home of Johnson Richardson, site of the first public house in Mendon, Vermont."

Newbury 30th April, 1781
In the service of the United States of America, belonging to the Saint Francis Tribe, enlisting for one year from May 1st, 1780. (Johnson Papers)
	Appointed	Name	Rank	Term	Remarks
Commissioned	1st May 1780	John Vincent	Captain	1 year	
Commissioned	"	John Sabattist	Ensign	"	died June 30, 1781
NCO	"	Swasin	Sergeant	"	[hard to read]
NCO	"	Louis	Sergeant	"	[hard to read]
1	"	Joseph	Private	"	
2	"	Joseph Sabattist	Private	"	
3	"	Baziel Sabattist	Private	"	
4	"	Apom Sabattist	Private	"	[nearly illegible]
5	"	Peal Susup Sr.	Private	"	died December 10
6	"	Tamenick	Private	"	died December 10
7	"	Joseph Molly	Private	"	
8	"	Peal Susap Jr.	Private	"	
9	"	Joseph Mohawk	Private	"	
10	"	Joseph Squant	Private	"	deserted March 1781
11	"	Joseph	Private	"	
12	"	John Battist	Private	"	
13	"	Charles	Private	"	[nearly illegible]
These Mustered in Captain John Vincent's Company of Indians as specified in the above Roll. The Rolls to be made agreeable to this Roll, and the remarks from 30th April, 1781.

The chart above combines information taken from an image of the original muster roll reprinted in Mudgett's article and the transcribed muster roll on page 409 of Frederic P. Well's History of Newbury, Vermont. Some of these names appear in other military records for cross reference as well as the DAR's database of patriots that includes Native Americans and Black soldiers.

These men from St. Francis were part of an Abenaki community settled in and around Newbury and into Coös. Gordon M. Day provides some detail:

- [Frederic P.] Wells thought there were as many as twenty families in 1780.
- In September of 1776 General Schuyler ordered Bedel to bring Indian families who had left Canada and were roaming about the Coös territory, down to the settlements on the Connecticut River, and supply them with necessities.
- In 1788 Bedel responded to Schuyler, "I have a number of Families from several of said tribes…who have been employed in our Service and live here to the amount of Ten families." Day wrote that these were probably the Indians known from Newbury's history, "Captain John and his sons and Joe and Molly."
- In 1781 General Bayley sent the muster roll (above) stating, "…a much larger number has been here at times but are not steady and though I do not think they have ever done us any damages but are rambling in the woods…"

Sergeant Swasin, a non-commissioned officer recorded in the muster roll, is the same Chief Swashan (DAR Capt. Swassin) who brought warriors from an Abenaki community in southern Maine to join with the Continental Army in Washington D.C. at the onset of the Revolution.^{277, 284} ^{26} Swassin’s Abenaki were likely Pigwackets, he can be found in local Maine history books and in Henry Tufts memoirs, and also had ties to St. Francis: they offered their services as guides through the Maine territory to enable a proposed US invasion of Québec (there are many mentions of him in local Maine histories). Swassin later joined up with Timothy Bedel's company based in Haverhill and Newbury.^{277, 284}

== Life after the Revolutionary War ==
At the conclusion of the war, Joseph received a letter of appreciation from George Washington and was invited with Molly to Newburgh, New York, to meet the general and dine with the officers.^{131} During this post-war time, he and Molly again picked up roaming in northern Vermont before settling on an island in what is now called Joe's Pond in Danville. On May 1798, in Derby, his name is recorded in the Account Book of shopkeeper Timothy Hinman. Although there is no military record yet located of a promotion for Joe from private, this entry is for "Capt Jos Indian" for the purchase of flour, pork, corn, and potatoes; Captain was a term frequently bestowed out of respect to aged Native warriors by white townsmen and could be the case here. On other days he purchased unspecified items and rum. Joe received a substantial pension at that time of $86 annually and had guardians to take care of him in his later years, namely John McDonald of Hyde Park, Timothy Hinman of Derby, and Frye Bayley of Newbury.

Many stories have been passed down about Joe; retellings of his kindness and generosity, some of which may be true. The Vermont communities who claim him as their own embraced him because he was "Joe the friendly Indian" and they felt a patriotic and neighborly connection. Early histories sometimes compared Joe to Captain John Vincent who was painted as an intimidating warrior in the Good Indian/Bad Indian vernacular of the day, and whose story then faded away although he is revered in the Mohawk and Abenaki Nations; Vincent was a remarkable man. Read John Vincent's obituary here.

Indian Joe died on February 19, 1819, apparently from the effects of exposure while hunting a few days previous.^{131} In 1886 residents of Newbury considered erecting a monument in his honor. Even though the monument was not built, his stories continue to be told and he remains a beloved historic and legendary figure from the earliest days of Newbury.

The Abenaki remember Joseph as a survivor of both the 1745 Siege of Louisbourg in Nova Scotia and the 1759 Rogers Raid on St. Francis in Quebec, husband of Molly, and as an “Indian Ranger” for the Continental Army, who had hunted in Coös and settled in Newbury, Vermont on what remains the Abenaki homeland, Ndakina.

=== Headstone ===
Joseph was buried in the Oxbow Cemetery, Newbury, Vermont. His headstone reads:

"Erected in the Memory of Old Joe the friendly Indian guide. Who died Feb. 19, 1819."

== Legacy ==
Several places are named after Joe and Molly:

- Joe's Pond between present day Danville and Cabot (West Danville)
- Joe's Brook, outlet of Joe's Pond, Danville
- Joe's Pond (smaller) in Morristown
- Molly's Falls in Cabot
- Molly's Pond in Morristown

Other tributes:

- "A Dirge for Jo Indian", composed in 1922, by Eastwood Lane as part of his Adirondack Sketches

== See also ==
- Military history of the Mi’kmaq people
