= Charles Carroll Webster =

American lawyer and politician

Charles Carroll Webster (May 1, 1824 – November 5, 1893) was an American lawyer and politician.

Webster was born in Cabot, Washington County, Vermont. He graduated from the University of Vermont in 1851. Webster moved to Minnesota in 1854 and was admitted to the Minnesota bar in 1856. He lived in Red Wing, Goodhue County, Minnesota, with his wife and family. Webster served as register of deeds for Goodhue County from 1860 to 1864 and as auditor of Goodhue County from 1897 to 1882. He also served on the Red Wing School Board and was president of the school board. Webster was a Republican and served in the Minnesota Senate in 1869. In 1890, Webster moved to Minneapolis, Minnesota, and served as the clerk of the United States Circuit and District Court. Webster died in Minneapolis, Minnesota.
