= Bust of Alexander Lyman Holley =

Bronze bust by John Quincy Adams Ward in New York City

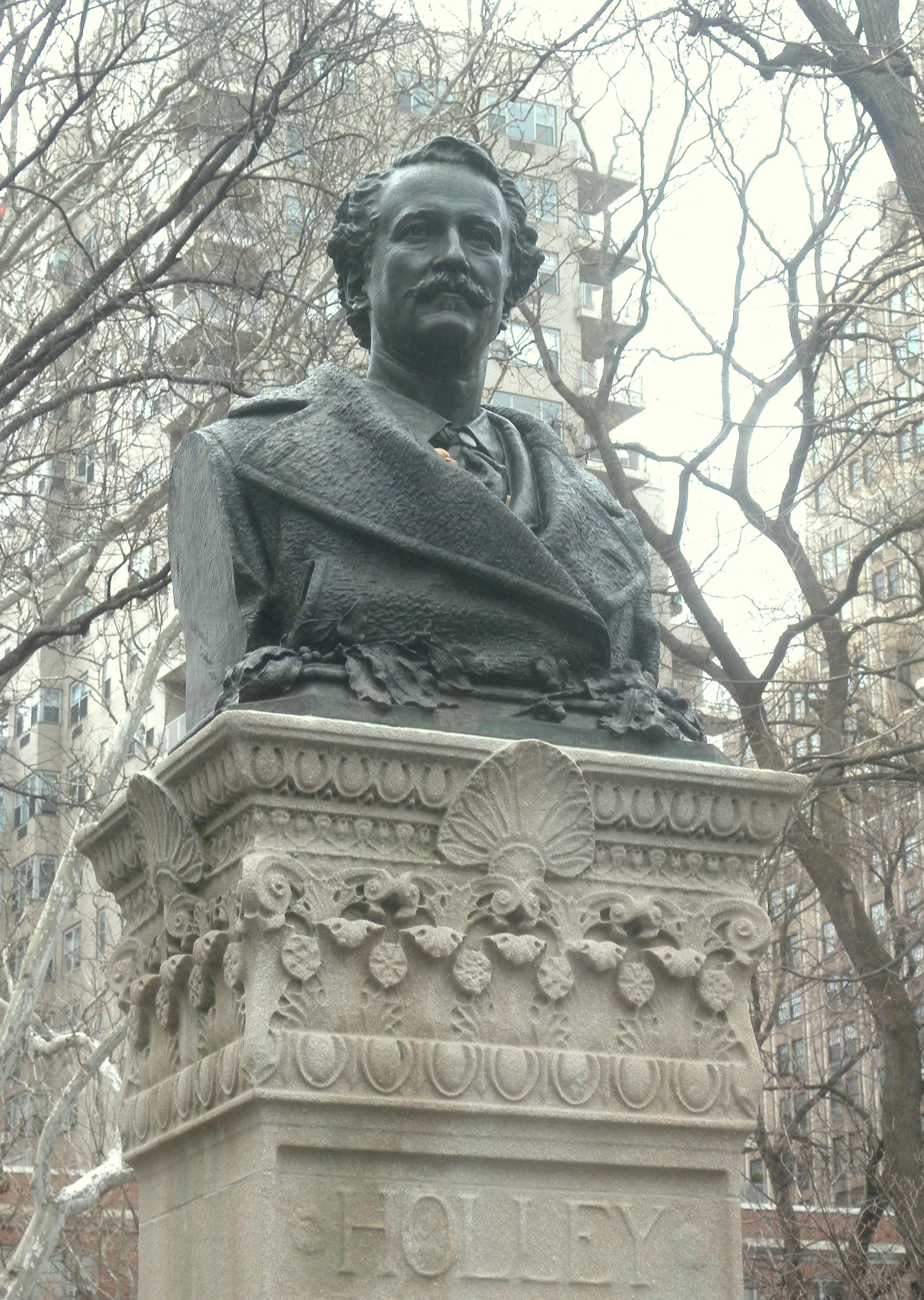
- The sculpture in 2011
- Artist: John Quincy Adams Ward; Thomas Hastings
- Year: 1889
- Type: Sculpture
- Medium: Bronze, limestone
- Subject: Alexander Lyman Holley
- Location: New York City, New York, United States; 40°43′52.6″N 73°59′53.3″W

An outdoor bronze bust of Alexander Lyman Holley by artist John Quincy Adams Ward and architect Thomas Hastings is installed in Washington Square Park in Manhattan, New York. Cast by the Henry-Bonnard Bronze Company of New York in 1889, the sculpture is set on an Indiana limestone pedestal and displays a Beaux-Arts style design. The monument was dedicated on October 2, 1890.

== See also ==
- 1889 in art
