= Alexander Lyman Holley =

American mechanical engineer, industrial designer, inventor and journalist

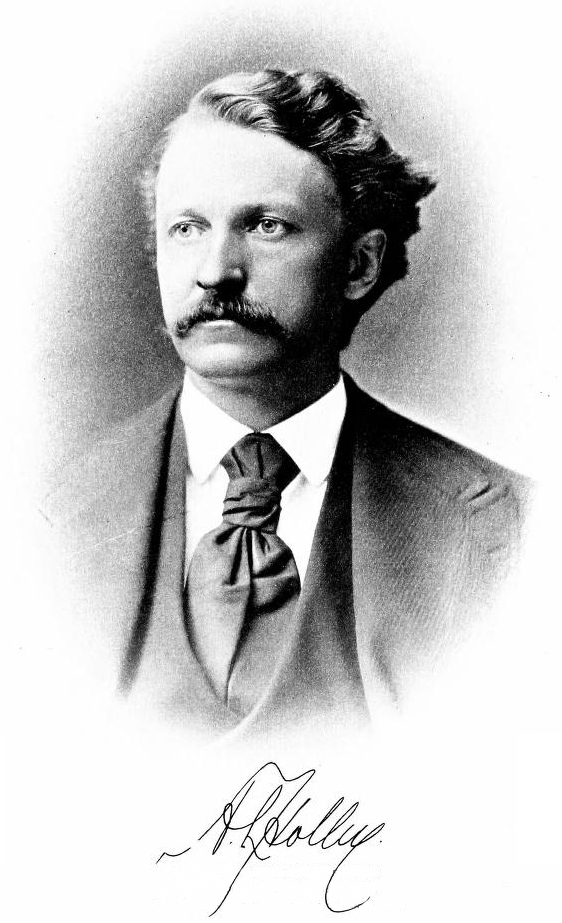
- Born: July 20, 1832; Lakeville, Connecticut, US
- Died: January 29, 1882 (aged 49); Brooklyn, New York, US
- Resting place: Green-Wood Cemetery
- Monuments: Bust of Alexander Lyman Holley
- Education: Brown University

Alexander Lyman Holley (Lakeville, Connecticut, July 20, 1832 – Brooklyn, New York, January 29, 1882) was an American mechanical engineer, inventor, and founding member of the American Society of Mechanical Engineers (ASME). He was considered the foremost steel and plant engineer and designer of his time, especially in regard to applying research to modern steel manufacturing processes.

== Biography ==
Born in Lakeville, Connecticut in 1832, Holley graduated from Brown University in 1853. He worked at Corlias & Nightingale (Corliss Steam Engine Works) as a workman and student. He also served as a locomotive engineer on Stonington and Providence Railroad, and then entered the New York Locomotive Works as a draughtsman.

During his early 20s, Holley was a close friend of Zerah Colburn, the well-known engineer and journalist/publisher who founded Railway Advocate and later transferred the journal to Holley.

In 1857, the two visited Britain and France to study the rail system and compiled a report for the presidents of American railroads, The Permanent Way published in 1858. Around the same time, Holley wrote to The New York Times accurately predicting screw propulsion would supersede side wheels for ocean navigation. Holley was also a construction consultant for development of Stevens Battery.

In 1860, the two traveled together on the maiden voyage of Isambard Kingdom Brunel's Great Eastern. Holley's most famous book, A treatise on ordnance and armor published in 1865, followed a visit he made to Britain in 1863 when he again met Zerah Colburn.

Holley was a creative inventor, who received 15 patents in the US. Ten of those fifteen were for improvements in the Bessemer process, for which he purchased the US rights in 1863 on behalf of a consortium of investors. He soon designed and built Bessemer plants in Troy, New York, Harrisburg, Pennsylvania, and Braddock, Pennsylvania. He planned or was consulted on a dozen others.

Holley served as president of the American Institute of Mining Engineers, and vice-president of the American Society of Civil Engineers. In 1880 Holley chaired the first meeting of the founders of the American Society of Mechanical Engineers (ASME) in the offices of the American Machinist on 16 February and afterwards served as vice-president of the society. He was also a trustee for Rensselaer Polytechnic Institute and lecturer at School of Mines, Columbia College.

In 1882 he was awarded the Bessemer Gold Medal of the British Iron and Steel Institute for his services to the industry.

== Legacy ==
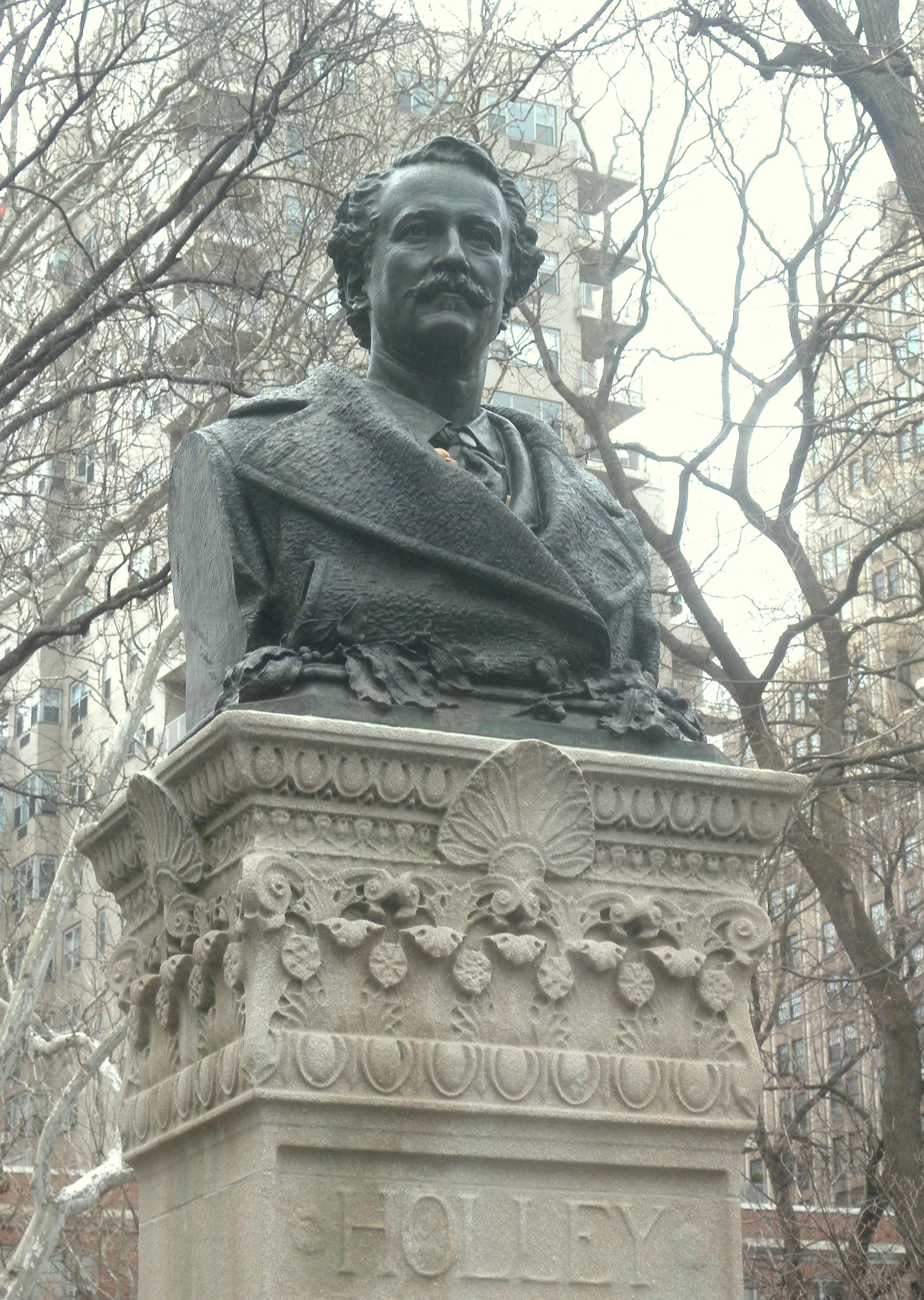
Bust of Alexander Lyman Holley in Washington Square Park.

The Holley medal is given out by the American Society of Mechanical Engineers in his honor. He received many honors, including being made an honorary member of the American Society of Mechanical Engineers in 1892; and in 1890 a monument was unveiled in Washington Square Park, New York bearing a bust of him.

== Publications, a selection ==
- 1858: (with Zerah Colburn & Julius Bien) The permanent way and coal-burning locomotive boilers of European railways; with a comparison of the working economy of European and American lines, and the principles upon which improvement must proceed. New York, Holley & Colburn.
- 1860: (with J. K. Fisher) The economy of steam power on common roads ... with its history and practice in Great Britain.... and its progress in the United States,
- 1865: A treatise on ordnance and armor: embracing descriptions, discussions, and professional opinions concerning the material, fabrication, requirements, capabilities, and endurance of European and American guns for naval, sea-coast, and iron-clad warfare, and their rifling, projectiles and breech-loading
- 1867: American and European Railway Practice in the Economical Generation of Steam. David Van Nostrand.
- 1878: (with Lenox Smith) The works of the Cambria Iron Company. London : Offices of "Engineering".
- 1881: Report of the United States board appointed to test iron, steel, and other metals.
- 1885: (with Joseph Barba) The use of steel for constructive purposes: method of working, applying and testing plates and bars.

Publications about Alexander Lyman Holley, his life and work

- American Institute of Mining, Metallurgical, and Petroleum Engineers (1884) Holley, 1832-1882. Memorial of Alexander Lyman Holley, C. E., LL. D., president of the American institute of mining engineers, vice-president of the American society of civil engineers, vice-president of the American society of mechanical engineers ...etc., etc. Born July 20, 1832. Died January 29, 1882.
- Thomas J. Misa (1998) Nation of Steel: the Making of Modern America 1865–1925 at Google Books
- John Mortimer (2005) Zerah Colburn the Spirit of Darkness at Google Books Arima Publishing ISBN 1-84549-024-X
