= Carlos Everett Conant =

American linguist (1870–1925)

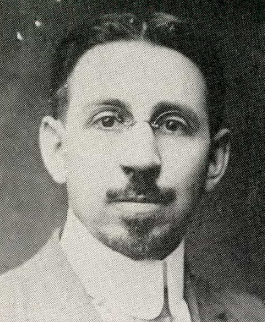
- Born: November 27, 1870; Cabot, Vermont, United States
- Died: January 27, 1925 (aged 54); Boston, Massachusetts, United States
- Education: University of Chicago (PhD); Lawrence College (AB, AM)
- Spouses: Dorothy Tuckerman (m. March 1902; died June 1902); Johanna (Julie); Laubmeyer (m. 1908)

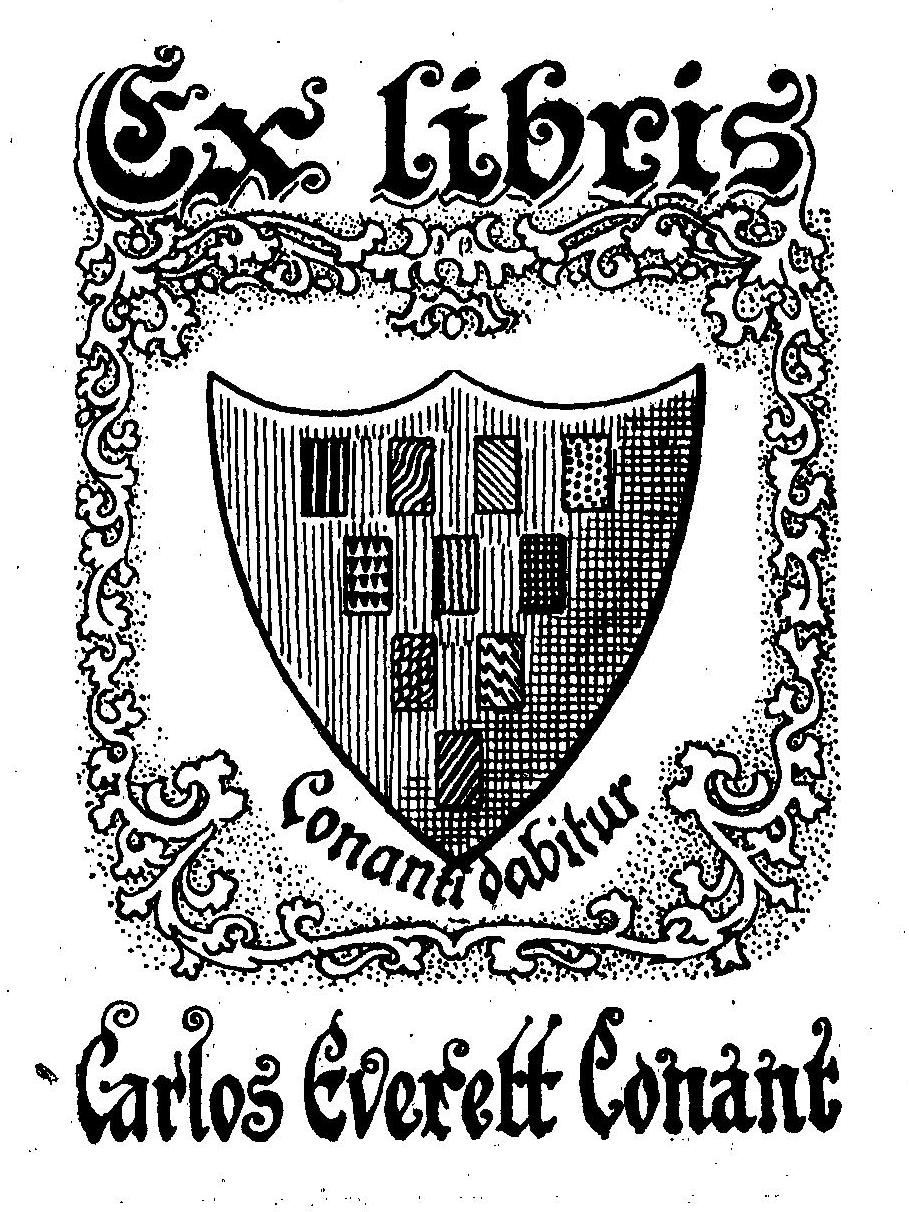
Personal bookplate of Carlos Everett Conant

Carlos Everett Conant (November 27, 1870 – January 27, 1925) was an American linguist who specialized in Austronesian languages, particularly the languages of the Philippines. He was also one of the founding members of the Linguistic Society of America.

== Life ==
Conant was born to Medora Reed and Henry Conant in Cabot, Vermont, on November 27, 1870.

While working as a teacher at Washburn College, Conant met Dorothy Tuckerman, a native of Topeka, Kansas. Tuckerman later joined Conant, who had moved to Bais, Negros Oriental, Philippines where he was serving as principal for a local school; she also had planned on taking a teaching position there. They married on March 11, 1902, however their marriage was short-lived as she contracted an illness and died in June 1902 in Dumaguete, Negros Oriental, Philippines.

In 1908, he married Julie Laubmeyer, a native of Königsberg, Germany.

=== Education ===
Conant graduated from Lawrence College with a Bachelor of Arts degree in 1892 and a Master of Arts degree in 1899.

In 1912, he earned a doctorate in Sanskrit and Comparative Philology at the University of Chicago. The title of his dissertation was The Pepet Law in Philippine Languages.

=== Career ===
According to his obituary in the January 28, 1925, edition of the New York Times, Conant worked as a language teacher, a Bible translator for Philippine languages (Ibanag, Cebuano, and Kapampangan), Spanish translator for the US government, Professor of Modern Languages at University of Chattanooga (1908-1910, 1911–1921), Assistant Professor of Romance Languages at Carleton College, fellow in Sanskrit and comparative philology at the University of Chicago, and head of the Department of Comparative Philology at Indiana University.

Among the courses he taught were Greek, Latin, German, Spanish, French, comparative philology, and Malayo-Polynesian philology.

=== Death ===
Conant died on January 25, 1925, at the age of 54 "[w]hile suffering from a nervous malady ... stepped from the edge of the roof of a Backbay (Boston) apartment house where lived with his wife, and was killed.". Though, the International News Services reported that Conant "committed suicide by leaping from an apartment house roof."

== Selected publications ==
Academic publications:

- "F" and "V" in Philippine languages (1908)
- The Names of Philippine languages (1909)
- The RGH Law in Philippine languages (1910)
- Monosyllabic roots in Pampanga (1911)
- Consonant changes and vowel harmony in Chamorro (1911)
- The Pepet Law in Philippine Languages (doctoral dissertation, 1912)
- Notes on the phonology of the Tirurai language (1913)
- Grammatical notes on the Isinai language (1915)
- Notes on the phonology of the Palau language (1915)
- Indonesian I in Philippine languages (1916)

Bible translations into Philippine languages:

- (Cebuano) Ang Evangelio ó ma-ayong balita sa atong guino-ong Jesu-Cristo matud ni San Lucas (1904)
- (Cebuano) Ang Evangelio ó maayong balita sa atong guinoong Jesu Cristo matud in San Marcos (1912)
- (Cebuano) Ang Bag-ong Katipan : sa atong Ginoong Jesukristo (1917)
- (Ibanag) Is Santa Biblia : ya egga sa á netura ib bagu naquipanabban onu Bagu Testamento nay yafu tam á si Jesu Cristo.(1911)
- (Ibanag) Evangelio tac cunna inilayyagayya ni Marcos : yaya y neturacan na y inangó, langan, anna tuddutuddu nay yafu tam Jesu Cristo ni Apostol Marcos (1911)
- (Ibanag) Ic quingngu-quingngua na Apostoles ira : yaya y neturacan na y inangó ira, tuddutuddu, anna langalangan na Apostoles ira nay yafu tam Jesu Cristo (1911)
- (Kapampangan) Ing Pentateuko : a mumunang limang libro ning santong kasulatan, Genesis, Exodo, Levitico, Ding-Bilang at Deuteronimo, a sinulat nang Moises (1914)
- (Kapampangan) Ing Santo Evangelio (ing banal á balita) ning guinu tang Jesu Cristo dikil kang San Lucas (1917)

Language textbook

- Manuel Tamayo y Baus, Más vale maña que fuerza, proverbio en un acto: with notes exercises, and vocabulary. (1918)
