= Jere A. Blount =

American politician

Jere A. Blount (born February 18, 1826) was an American politician. He was a member of the Wisconsin State Assembly during the 1876 session. Additionally, he was a town clerk and city alderman in 1870 and 1874 He was a Democrat. He was born in Danville, Vermont.
