= Cabot, Vermont =

- Town
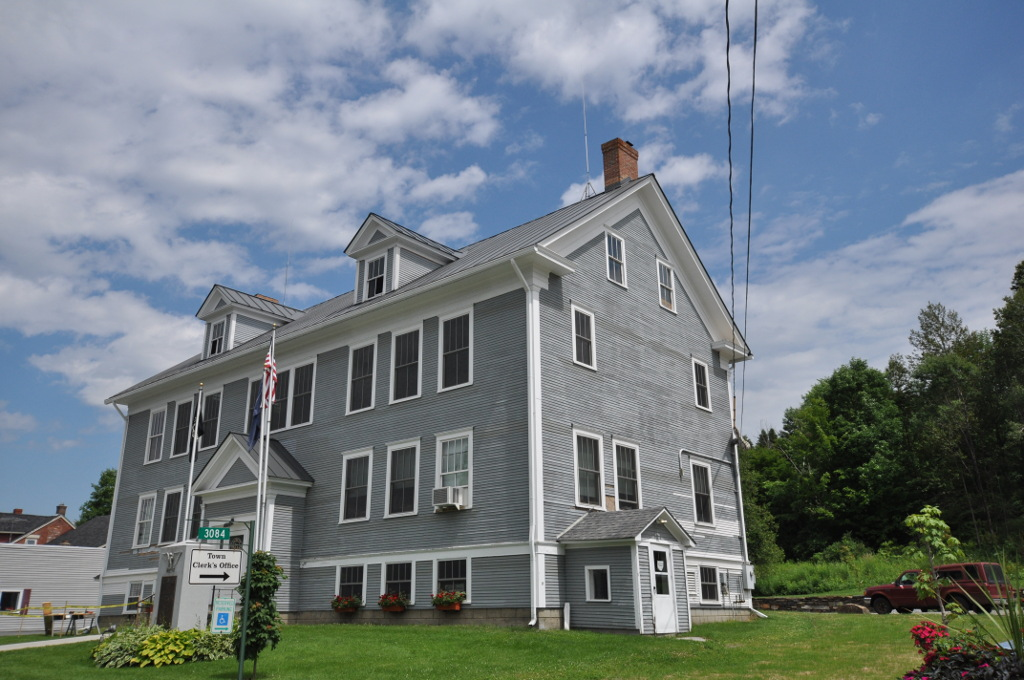
- Cabot Town Hall

- Location in Washington County and the state of Vermont
- Coordinates: 44°23′36″N 72°18′05″W
- Country: United States
- State: Vermont
- County: Washington
- Communities: Cabot; Cabot Plains; East Cabot; Lower Cabot; South Cabot

Area
  - Total: 38.5 sq mi (99.8 km^{2})
  - Land: 37.3 sq mi (96.6 km^{2})
  - Water: 1.2 sq mi (3.2 km^{2})
- Elevation: 1,437 ft (438 m)

Population (2020)
  - Total: 1,443
  - Density: 38.7/sq mi (14.9/km^{2})
- Time zone: UTC-5 (Eastern (EST))
  - Summer (DST): UTC-4 (EDT)
- ZIP Codes: 05647 (Cabot); 05658 (Marshfield); 05873 (West Danville)
- Area code: 802
- FIPS code: 50-11125
- GNIS feature ID: 1462061
- Website: www.cabotvt.us

Cabot is a six-mile-square town located in the northeast corner of Washington County, Vermont, United States. The population was 1,443 at the 2020 census. It contains the unincorporated villages of Cabot Village, Cabot Plain, South Cabot (Hookerville), East Cabot, Lower Cabot, and West Hill. There was also a community known as Petersville until property owners there sold a total of 100 acres to Molly’s Falls Electric Light and Power Company, and in 1925 a large dam was constructed on Molly’s Brook (named after Molly, the wife of Indian Joe), that completely flooded the area that had been farms and homes to create what is now known as Molly’s Falls Reservoir, or sometimes “Marshfield Dam,” which is located close to the Cabot/Marshfield town line.

== Geography ==
The most notable of Cabot’s several ponds are: Coit’s Pond, the origin of the Winooski River; Molly’s Pond that sits on the Continental Divide and has outlets flowing east towards the Connecticut River and west into the Winooski River and Lake Champlain; West Hill Pond, originally called the “great field” by early settlers as it was the only cleared area for miles in the wilderness before a dam on the brook created a shallow pond; and the three-mile-long, 396 acre Joe’s Pond (named for Indian Joe) situated in Cabot and Danville. Molly’s Pond State Park has over 1,000 acres and includes the 411-acre reservoir created by a dam built in 1926-27 that flooded the small farming community of Petersville. This reservoir, which is entirely within the town of Cabot, provides power to operate Marshfield No. 6 hydroelectric plant located just over the town line between Cabot and Marshfield on Rte. 215S.

Cabot is the location of the Cabot Creamery, founded in 1893 primarily as a butter factory to add value to milk production. Today the creamery is a producer and national distributor of dairy products, especially known for their cheddar cheese. Cabot Creamery is by far Cabot’s largest employer with a manufacturing and packaging plant at the original site and extensions of the business in nearby locations as well as New York state and Massachusetts. Organized as a cooperative in 1919 by 94 members with a total of 863 cows, the creamery has struggled and re-invented itself several times as economic and population changes have occurred. There were 77 farms sending milk to the Cabot Creamery Cooperative in 1952, eight of which were within the village limits. Today there are no farms within the village limits and only six dairy farms within the entire town. The creamery draws from other towns for the massive amount of product needed to sustain the ever-growing demand for Cabot cheese.

Former Cabot dairy farms are now fruit orchards, maple operations, vegetable farms, or are growing herbs or producing hay, raising beef, sheep, turkeys, or goats. Crafters, wood carvers, arborists, gardeners/landscapers, musicians, authors and other professionals or retirees make their home in the historic scenic landscape of rural Cabot.

The village of Cabot nestles on the banks of the Winooski River. It is now the only community within the township with active commerce. The post office, church with a day-care center, library, and town offices are situated there, along with a volunteer fire department and ambulance service. Main Street businesses include a grocery store and deli; computer sales, service, and drone business; an automotive garage; a bar serving craft beer and cider located in a hardware store; and a restaurant and pub. There is also an 8-unit senior housing complex, Cabot Commons, opened in 2005, within easy access of downtown businesses and the town offices and library located in the Willey Memorial Building. The former Masonic Lodge Hall is now home to “Neighbors in Action,” an active community service organization.

Cabot is fortunate to have an art barn gallery that is open for exhibits in the summer, and the Cabot Historical Society, also open from about May to October. The historical society houses an impressive collection of artifacts, along with a library of genealogy and reference materials. The two-story former school and community hall that was built in 1849 has been uniquely preserved to display the town’s historical artifacts. The society also owns and maintains a restored one-room schoolhouse located on West Hill.

Throughout the year, the village common hosts a variety of concerts, field days, farmers’ markets, and craft events. There is a community skating rink on the common in the winter, and hiking and snowmobile trails run through the town. There is also a well-maintained town forest.

Cabot holds annual town meetings and its business is managed by a five-member selectboard that meets regularly, at least twice each month.

== History ==
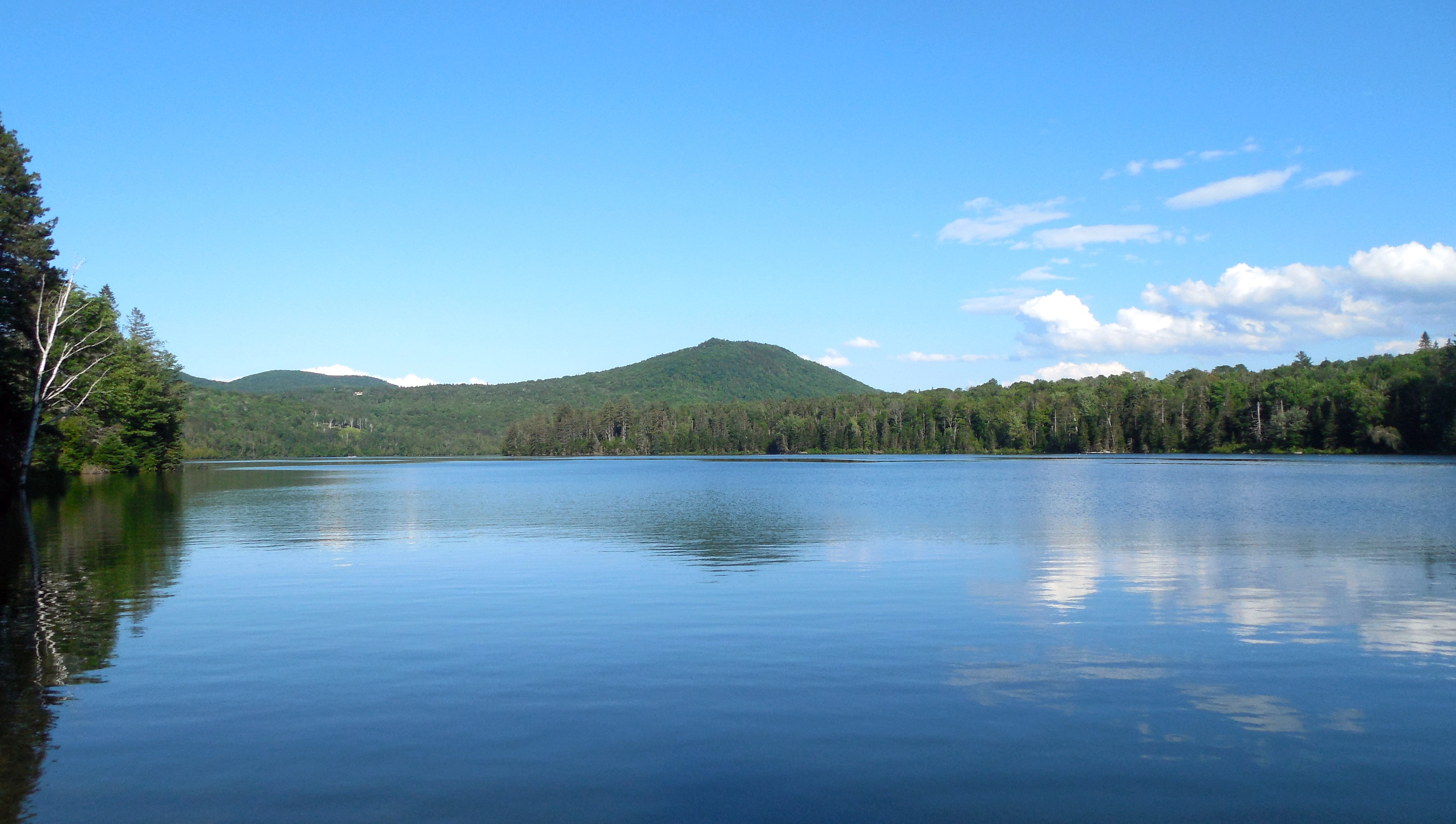
Molly's Falls Reservoir in Cabot

The town of Cabot was granted in 1780, and settlement began on the Plain, also known as Fortification Hill or Johnson’s Plain when the military were encamped there. The first settler, Benjamin Webster, arrived in 1783, followed by Lieut. Jonathan Heath, Nathaniel Webster, and Lieut. Thomas Lyford, with their families. The town was named by settler Lyman Hitchcock after his wife, Sophia Cabot (no relation to Venetian explorers John and Sebastian Cabot). Lyman Hitchcock became in 1788 the first town clerk of Cabot.

When the Bayley-Hazen Military Road opened in 1775-1776 from Newbury northwest to what is now known as Cabot Plain, the original intent was to build a road through the unexplored wilderness from the northernmost town of Newbury to St. Johns, Quebec, Canada, to facilitate getting supplies to the army that hoped to defeat the British and capture Canada. The road was never completed, but it served to open the northern territory for settlement.

Cabot Plain remained the business center of town until around 1796, when town officials decided to move business to the geographic center of the town, about a mile downhill south of the Plain. A meeting house was constructed, also a pound to contain wandering farm animals, and a whipping post that was used only once to punish an errant citizen. By 1799, all town business was conducted at the Center of Town and gradually traffic over the Plain diminished.

As the town grew, mills, businesses, and farms clustered near the Winooski River and extended south to form a community known as Lower Cabot. By about 1826 the business affairs of the town had moved from the geographic center of the town to the new settlement in the valley by the Winooski River, where it remains today.

The Town of Cabot was incorporated on November 19, 1866. Communities within the township clustered along brooks or near ponds, utilizing the abundant waterpower for sawmills, grist mills, and in Lower Cabot, a woolen mill.

== Demographics ==
Historical population
Census	Pop.	Note	%±
1790	122		—
1800	349		186.1%
1810	686		96.6%
1820	1,032		50.4%
1830	1,304		26.4%
1840	1,440		10.4%
1850	1,356		−5.8%
1860	1,318		−2.8%
1870	1,279		−3.0%
1880	1,242		−2.9%
1890	1,074		−13.5%
1900	1,126		4.8%
1910	1,116		−0.9%
1920	1,036		−7.2%
1930	1,107		6.9%
1940	974		−12.0%
1950	826		−15.2%
1960	763		−7.6%
1970	663		−13.1%
1980	958		44.5%
1990	1,043		8.9%
2000	1,213		16.3%
2010	1,433		18.1%
2020	1,443		0.7%
U.S. Decennial Census

As of the census of 2010, there were 1,433 people, 570 households, and 404 families residing in the town. The population density was 37.2 people per square mile (14.4/km^{2}). There were 771 housing units at an average density of 20.0 per square mile (7.7/km^{2}). The racial makeup of the town was 97.2% White, 0.6% Black or African American, 0.2% Native American, 0.3% Asian, 0% from other races, and 1.7% from two or more races. Hispanic or Latino of any race were 0.6% of the population.

There were 570 households, out of which 32.5% had children under the age of 18 living with them, 58.2% were married couples living together, 8.9% had a female householder with no husband present, and 29.1% were non-families. 23.0% of all households were made up of individuals, and 8.6% had someone living alone who was 65 years of age or older. The average household size was 2.51 and the average family size was 2.94.

In the town, the population was spread out, with 24.7% under the age of 18, 6.2% from 18 to 24, 22.3% from 25 to 44, 32.6% from 45 to 64, and 14.2% who were 65 years of age or older. The median age was 43 years. For every 100 females, there were 100.4 males. For every 100 females age 18 and over, there were 94.4 males.

As of the 2000 census, the median income for a household in the town was $43,092, and the median income for a family was $49,205. Males had a median income of $31,544 versus $25,000 for females. The per capita income for the town was $18,585. About 4.4% of families and 7.5% of the population were below the poverty line, including 7.2% of those under age 18 and 5.7% of those age 65 or over.

== Schools ==
Each community had its own school, the first being on the Plain, then known as “Shepherd’s Hill” at the junction of what is now the Bayley Hazen Road and Cabot Plains Road. It was a log cabin with no windows and only a fireplace for heat. Pegs driven into the logs supported boards that served as desks for the students sitting on benches. The first schoolteacher there was John Gunn in the summer of 1792. A few years later a new school was under construction opposite where the cemetery is today, but before it was finished it was moved from that “bleak place” to the corner near where the log school had been.

Early schools were scattered throughout the town strategically so that no student had to walk more than two miles to attend. The early buildings had few windows, no electricity or plumbing, and usually a large iron stove set in the middle of the room for heat. Each school had at least one outhouse or “privy,” and students used a communal bucket of water with a dipper for drinking. Teachers in the earliest schools were sometimes itinerant men who contracted to teach for a few weeks, depending on what the town could afford; or sometimes a young girl in town who had at least some education that was considered adequate for her to teach. Male teachers were always paid more than female teachers, regardless of their qualifications.

The Cabot Plains School at the junction of Cabot Plains Road and Bolton Road was built in 1923 and was the town’s first “Standard School.” It replaced a basic one-room building which was later sold and used as a garage. The new building had central heating, water, electricity, and toilets. Cabot’s second “Standard School” was built in 1930 in South Cabot. None of the schools had more than one teacher, and sometimes upwards of thirty students in all eight grades. Both the Cabot Plains school and the South Cabot school are now private residences. There are several other original school buildings in existence in town, all privately owned except the West Hill school that is owned by the Cabot Historical Society and open on special occasions for tours.

Cabot’s one-room schools closed gradually as the population in communities changed. There was a general decline in farms after the Civil War as young men left Vermont seeking a better climate and free land for farming or other enterprises. As the town’s population dwindled, maintaining one-room schools for only a few students became an expensive burden, and with better roads and automobiles, the smaller schools were gradually closed. The schools in Lower Cabot, Cabot Plain and East Cabot closed in 1948, and the South Cabot school closed in 1954. Children were then transported by bus to the Cabot Village School, built in 1938, that served grades one through twelve and is still in use, now serving pre-K-12 students. Several of Cabot’s one-room schools are still standing and are privately owned seasonal or year-around residences.

Today Cabot maintains one of the few pre-K-12 schools left in Vermont. The school campus includes a gymnasium, performing arts center, several individual buildings for elementary students, and there are two recreation fields that are each within walking distance from the campus.

== Cemeteries ==
There are seven cemeteries in Cabot. Each small community had their own burial ground. The first formal cemetery was established in 1799 at the center of town on land purchased from William Osgood, a long-time town clerk for Cabot. Osgood was the first to be buried there in 1801; the last burial in that cemetery was in 1846. It is well maintained and at least eight Revolutionary War veterans are among a total of 89 people known to be buried there.

Durant Cemetery (1812-present) is in Lower Cabot; Kimball (1814) was a very small grave site on West Hill that was replaced by the existing West Hill (1817- present) cemetery; Cabot Village, also known as Elm Street Cemetery (1820-present), Cabot Plains (1825-present); South Cabot (1834 to present); and East Cabot (1847 to present). A feature at Durant is the Sunken Garden, near the Winooski River. Cabot Plains Cemetery has views of Camel's Hump, the Worcester Range and Mt. Mansfield in the west, Jay Peak and Canadian peaks in the north, and the White Mountains looking east. West Hill cemetery is in the middle of a working farm; the Center Cemetery is quite remote among tall pine trees with only a path through farm fields to reach it.

== Historic sites ==
The historic Bayley-Hazen Road crosses Cabot Plain from the Danville-Cabot town line near Route 2 and West Shore Road and continues in a generally northwesterly direction to cross Route 215 into Walden and ends at Hazen’s Notch in Lowell, Vermont. The road was intended to provide a shorter supply route to America's Continental Army in St. Johns, Quebec, Canada during the American Revolution of 1776. Colonel Jacob Bayley initiated the idea of the road in the spring of 1776, and Thomas Johnson and a small party of men blazed the trail and measured the distance. Johnson estimated the new road would be some 73 miles shorter than the route to Crown Point which was currently being used. Bayley presented the plan to George Washington, Commander in Chief of the Continental Army. Washington agreed to Bayley's proposal; however, the Continental Congress was slow to make a decision, Approval for the work was finally granted, and in the early summer of 1776, James Whitelaw began surveying the route and Bayley and his crew of 110 men began work, following closely behind the surveying crew. Shortly after work began on the road Bayley was informed that the Continental Army had been defeated and the road was no longer a military priority. Bayley and his men abandoned the project on Cabot Plain and returned to Newbury.

There were plans in the summer of 1778 for another invasion of Canada, and General Moses Hazen was sent to complete the road Colonel Bayley had begun. Soon after work resumed, it became evident that the British would use the proposed road as a guide to reach deep into Vermont. There were a few skirmishes when small scouting parties ventured south along the trail, and by the end of the summer of 1779, work ceased entirely and the road was never finished beyond Hazen’s Notch in Lowell.

There are markers on Cabot Plain showing the location of the military road and Hazen's encampment site.

== Military notes ==
Three hundred men from Cabot were eligible to serve during the Civil War. Of these, one hundred forty-five (48%) volunteered. Most served in units mustering in St. Johnsbury: the 16th, 3rd and 4th Vermont Regiments. Forty-five were killed, for a fatality rate of 31%. Furthermore, it is likely that most of the rest suffered non-fatal casualties. Seventeen of these dead are honored by name on a war monument which stands in town; the others were not known to those who erected the monument.

At least 47 men enlisted in the military to serve during World War I. There is no accurate count of how many men died in that war. Approximately 149 enlisted to serve in World War II, and four were killed while serving.

A memorial honoring men and women from Cabot, who served in recent wars, was erected in front of Willey Memorial Hall and dedicated in 1992.

== Climate and weather ==
Cabot has a typical northern Vermont climate with a generally short growing season. Winters can be harsh with high snow amounts and long periods of below-zero temperatures. Summers are normally moderate with fluctuating temperatures and conditions. Due to the hilly landscape of the town, it is prone to flood damage, particularly in Cabot Village, and the hill sections to damaging winds.

== Notable people ==
- Zerah Colburn, math prodigy
- Carlos Everett Conant, professor, linguist, translator, interpreter of Philippine languages
- Edward M. Doe, Arizona Territorial jurist
- Peter Gray, psychologist, professor, and textbook author
- Luis Guzmán, actor; lives in Cabot
- John H. Senter, United States Attorney for Vermont, mayor of Montpelier, Vermont
- Ellen Bryant Voigt, poet, teacher, and founder of The Warren Wilson MFA Program for Writers
- Will Voigt, 2016 Nigerian Olympic basketball team coach
- Charles Carroll Webster, Minnesota state senator and lawyer

== See also ==
- Cabot Creamery
