= Zerah Colburn (engineer and writer) =

American engineer, journalist and publisher

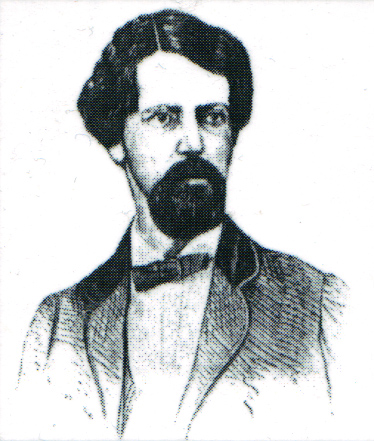
- Born: January 13, 1832; Saratoga, New York
- Died: April 26, 1870 (aged 38); Belmont, Massachusetts
- Occupations: Mechanical engineer, journalist

Zerah Colburn (January 13, 1832 – April 26, 1870) was an American engineer who specialised in steam locomotive design, and later a technical journalist, the author of reports on engineering subjects and a periodical publisher.

== Career ==
Without any formal schooling, Colburn was a teenage prodigy. Barely in his teens at the start of the railroad boom, he found work in Lowell, Massachusetts as an apprentice in the "drafting room" of the Lowell Machine Shops where America’s first steam locomotives were taking shape.

While working among the locomotives Colburn also began to write and before long compiled his first regular newssheet – Monthly Mechanical Tracts.

As he moved about the locomotive works of New England gathering experience and an eye for engineering detail, he also produced his first book, The Throttle Lever. Designed as an introduction to the steam locomotive, this became the standard U.S. textbook on building locomotives. It not only took Colburn, then not 20, deeper into the world of publishing, but also earned him wider respect amongst railroad men across America – locomotive builders and train operators.

Colburn worked or was associated with a number of locomotive works between 1854 and 1858, including: Baldwin Locomotive Works, Tredegar Locomotive Works – part of Tredegar Iron Works at Richmond, Virginia, Rogers Locomotive Works, and the New Jersey Locomotive and Machine Company.

In 1853 he joined the American Railroad Journal, the leading American railroad newspaper. Colburn, who had a fiery temper, parted from this publication after a dispute with the editor and launched his own weekly paper – the Railroad Advocate.

The Advocate increased his sphere of influence and paved the way for a partnership with a young man, of similar age – Alexander Lyman Holley. Together they developed the paper but Colburn, ever restless, sold half to Holley, then took off West to start a venture with a sawmill and then tried his hand at selling railroad tires.

Returning from a visit to England as the Advocate’s roving reporter, he and Holley relaunched the Advocate as American Engineer. From the first issue to the last, it remained a weekly paper reporting technical and business aspects of locomotive manufacture and railroad operation in America in the 1850s. Following the panic of 1857, the paper had to close.

The duo visited Britain to compile a massive report about the successful state of Europe’s railways to sell to the presidents of America’s railroads. The report was a success, but by 1858 Colburn returned to England to take up a job as editor of The Engineer, Britain’s leading weekly technical journal. In this position, Colburn made friends with members of the Institutions of Civil and Mechanical Engineers and became a member of both. He gave frequent lectures and contributed at meetings. It is almost certain that while in London Colburn met Isambard Kingdom Brunel. In 1860, Colburn returned to America on the maiden voyage of the Great Eastern, Brunel's leviathan steamship. In America he launched a new weekly engineering newspaper, The Engineer, but this lasted only a few months and Colburn returned to England to take up his previous position at The Engineer in London. Four years later, Colburn was dismissed from The Engineer as a result of personal scandal, taking up engineering consultancy and beginning work on a two-volume textbook on locomotive engineering that would forever define him as a leading engineer. This work, Locomotive Engineering and the mechanism of railways, was not published in its final form until 1871 – a year after his death. It was completed by the well-known locomotive engineer D. K. Clark, a close friend of Colburn's.

In 1864 he was awarded a Telford Medal by the Institution of Civil Engineers for his paper "On American Iron Bridges" In 1869 he received a second Telford Medal for "On American Locomotives and Rolling Stock".

In 1866, Colburn founded Engineering in London as a weekly rival to The Engineer using funds provided by Henry Bessemer, the English engineer and inventor known chiefly in connection with the Bessemer process for the manufacture of steel. Engineering was an instant success and soon overtook The Engineer as Colburn’s writing style and wide engineering knowledge gave readers the information they needed.

== Personal life ==
Colburn was the nephew of his namesake, Zerah Colburn, a noted arithmetical prodigy.

In 1853 Colburn married Adelaide Felecita Driggs, 12 years his senior. They had a daughter, Sarah Pearl. He became estranged from his wife whereupon Colburn bigamously married Elizabeth Suzanna Browning from London in New York in September 1860. He went through a second marriage ceremony with Elizabeth, this time in London in 1864, which led to his sacking from The Engineer.

Colburn had a career of breakneck speed; he was a restless man, quick of brain and quick of temper; he fell into jobs and fell in with people, but then throughout his life, fell out with them too.

Ultimately overwork, an addiction to laudanum, alcohol and poor financial management took their toll. But Colburn suffered from another flaw. Following his numerous visits to the 1867 Paris Exhibition on behalf of Engineering, where he contracted syphilis, he became increasingly delighted by London prostitutes whose pleasures he much enjoyed. In the divorce petition filed against him by his wife Elizabeth, Colburn is accused of infecting her with syphilis, physical abuse, and adultery with five different prostitutes. Colburn, sensing the impending shame offered by Fleet Street journalists and their diligence to seek out and publish the truth, became depressed and reckless, leading to his return to the U.S. – where he was disowned by his first wife Adelaide Felicita Colburn and daughter Sarah Pearl.

Colburn committed suicide at age 38. He was discovered near death by two boys taking their dog for a walk in Tudor's Pear Orchard, Belmont, Massachusetts, with a derringer in his hand.
