= Stockholder of record =

Stockholder of record is the name of an individual or entity shareholder that an issuer carries in its shareholder register as the registered holder (not necessarily the beneficial owner) of the issuer's securities. Dividends and other distributions are paid only to shareholders of record. Stockholder of record may be also called shareholder of record or holder of record or owner of record.
