= Cabot Creamery =

American dairy cooperative

Cabot Creamery Cooperative
- Type: Agricultural cooperative
- Industry: Food processing
- Founded: 1919
- Headquarters: Waitsfield, Vermont, United States
- Website: https://cabotcreamery.com/

The Cabot Creamery Cooperative is an American dairy agricultural marketing cooperative owned by Agri-Mark. The cooperative has a plant in Cabot, Vermont, but its administrative headquarters is in Waitsfield, Vermont.

== History ==
The Cabot village creamery was built in 1893.

The original plant had a total investment of $3,700 (equivalent to $68,700 in 2025), which was paid by 94 farmers in proportion to the number of cattle which each owned. The cooperative started out making butter with the excess milk produced, and began shipping its products south. In 1930, it started making cheese. By 1960, the cooperative had 600 member farmers, although the number of farms in Vermont and across the nation was steadily shrinking.

Following a decline in membership, the Cabot Farmers Cooperative Creamery merged in 1992 with Agri-Mark, a cooperative of 1,800 farm families in New England and New York, and was reincorporated as Cabot Creamery Cooperative Inc., a wholly owned subsidiary of Agri-mark. In 2008, there were about 400 Cabot farms in Vermont belonging to Agri-Mark.

The Cabot Farmers' store is located at 2657 Waterbury-Stowe Road in Waterbury, Vermont.

In addition to the Cabot brand, Agri-Mark also owns McCadam Cheese, headquartered in Chateaugay, New York. Established in 1876 by William McCadam in the small community of Heuvelton, New York, the company first gained national recognition winning the first medal at the World's Columbian Exposition in Chicago in 1894. In 1934, during the midst of the Great Depression McCadam expanded its cheese manufacturing to a facility in Chateaugay, which is its primary cheese manufacturing facility today. McCadam merged with Agri-Mark/Cabot in 2003.

As of 2012, about 1,200 members were located throughout New England and upstate New York. Faced with a multitude of challenges ranging from low milk pricing, labor shortages and increased operating costs over the past decade, the cooperative lost nearly 400 farms. As of 2021, there are approximately 800 farms in the co-op. The Rochdale Principles remain a part of the cooperative.

Cabot entered into a partnership with Dakin Farm in 2012 for e-commerce and other reasons.

== Awards ==
Wine Spectator listed Cabot cloth-bound cheddar as one of "100 great cheeses" of the world in 2008. Also in 2008, Cabot Monterey Jack received an award from the American Cheese Society.

== Ownership ==
As a co-op, Agri-Mark is a membership organization incorporated in Delaware on April 21, 1980. The members of the Agri-Mark cooperative, who supply Agri-Mark's equity capital and directly elect its directors, are not stockholders of record, so have no right under Delaware statutory law to inspect the corporation's books and records. Only the directors who hold a share of stock are owners under Delaware law.

The co-op retains much of the excess profit, up to $150,000 per farmer, as equity in the form of noninterest bearing loans. For farmers departing the co-op, this equity is repaid over seven years. Dividends in excess of the retained equity are returned to the members.

The Delaware stock corporation signs yearly marketing agreements with the farmers who produce milk. They can decline to re-sign any producer without cause at the termination of the contract.

== Operations ==
In 1994, when the two companies merged, they had $30 million in sales. This reached $350 million in 2008. and combined Agri-Mark sales (for all products across all brands) reached nearly $1 billion in 2020.

== Controversy ==
On several occasions, Cabot has been penalized for pollution incidents by the Vermont Agency of Natural Resources. In 2000, Cabot was cited for a "minor violation of [its] indirect discharge permit and land use permit." In 2007, Cabot paid a $50,000 fine with an additional $50,000 funding of a Supplemental Environmental Projects. In 2007, Cabot also pleaded guilty to violating the Clean Water Act after an ammonia spill killed thousands of fish in the Winooski River, in July 2005. The spill destroyed all aquatic life for 5.5 miles (8.9 km).

In 2011, the Vermont Attorney General's office alleged that some Cabot products made in 2009 and 2010 could not be certified as free of rBST, a hormone that causes cows to produce more milk. Cabot settled with the state, agreeing not to make such representations, to pay a $65,000 fine, and to donate $75,000 worth of dairy products to local food banks.

In April 2025, Cabot Creamery's Extra Creamy Premium Butter with sea salt was recalled in Arkansas, Connecticut, Maine, New Hampshire, New York, Pennsylvania, and Vermont due to being contaminated with elevated levels of coliform. The recall included about 1,700 pounds of butter that had a September 9, 2025 best-by date.

== See also ==
- List of cheesemakers
