= West Danville, Vermont =

- Village
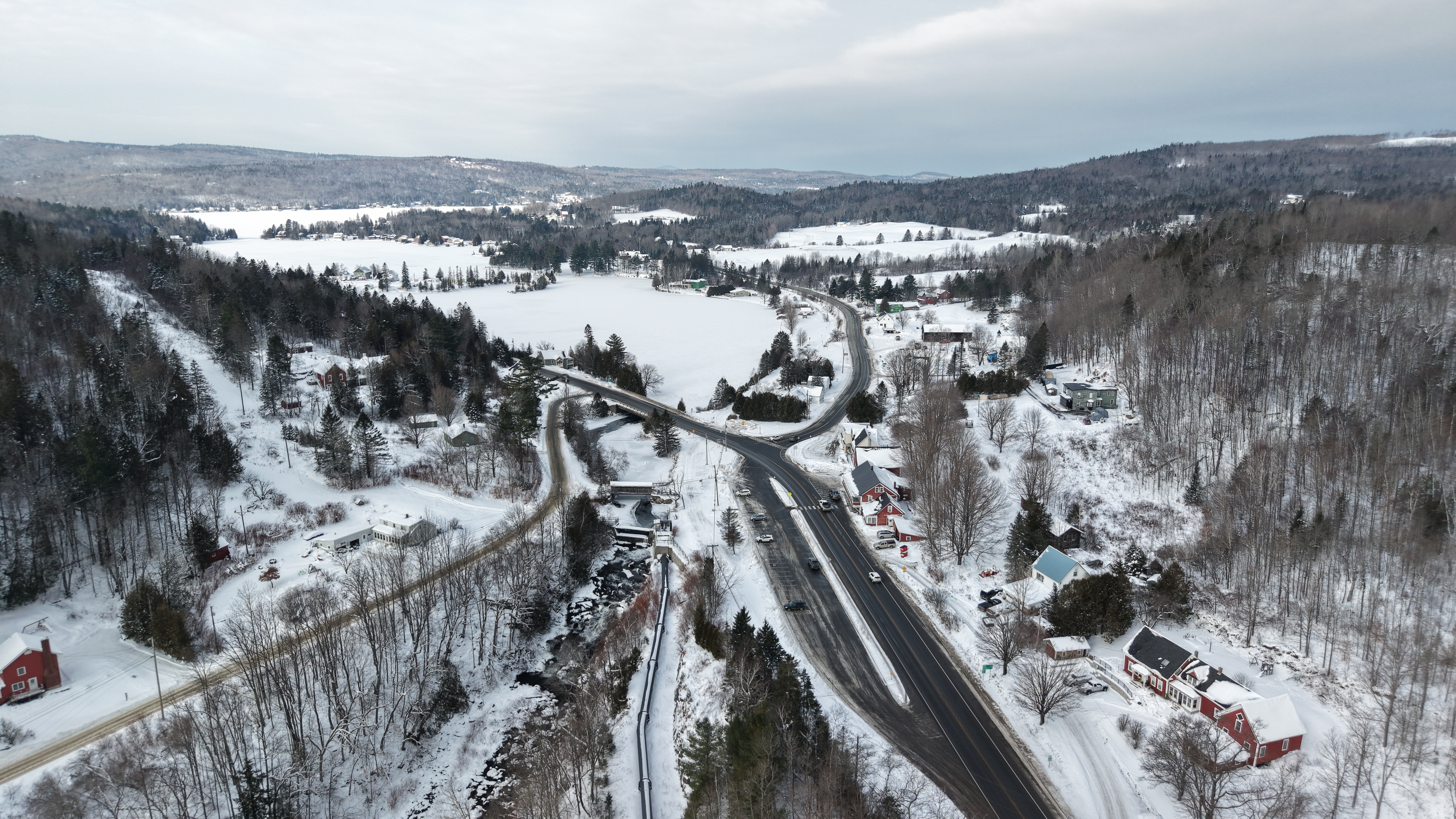
- West Danville and Joe's Pond, Vermont, from the east

- Location within Vermont
- Coordinates: 44°24′34″N 72°11′42″W
- Country: United States
- State: Vermont
- County: Caledonia
- Elevation: 1,588 ft (484 m)
- Time zone: UTC-5 (Eastern (EST))
  - Summer (DST): UTC-4 (EDT)
- ZIP code: 05873
- Area code: 802
- GNIS feature ID: 1460130

West Danville is an unincorporated village in the town of Danville, Caledonia County, Vermont, United States. The community is located at the intersection of U.S. Route 2 and Vermont Route 15 8.9 miles (14.3 km) west of St. Johnsbury. West Danville has a post office with ZIP code 05873.

In July 2017, the Charles D. Brainerd Public Library reopened in West Danville, again making the village the location of Vermont's smallest library.
