= Mary Eastman Ward =

American poet

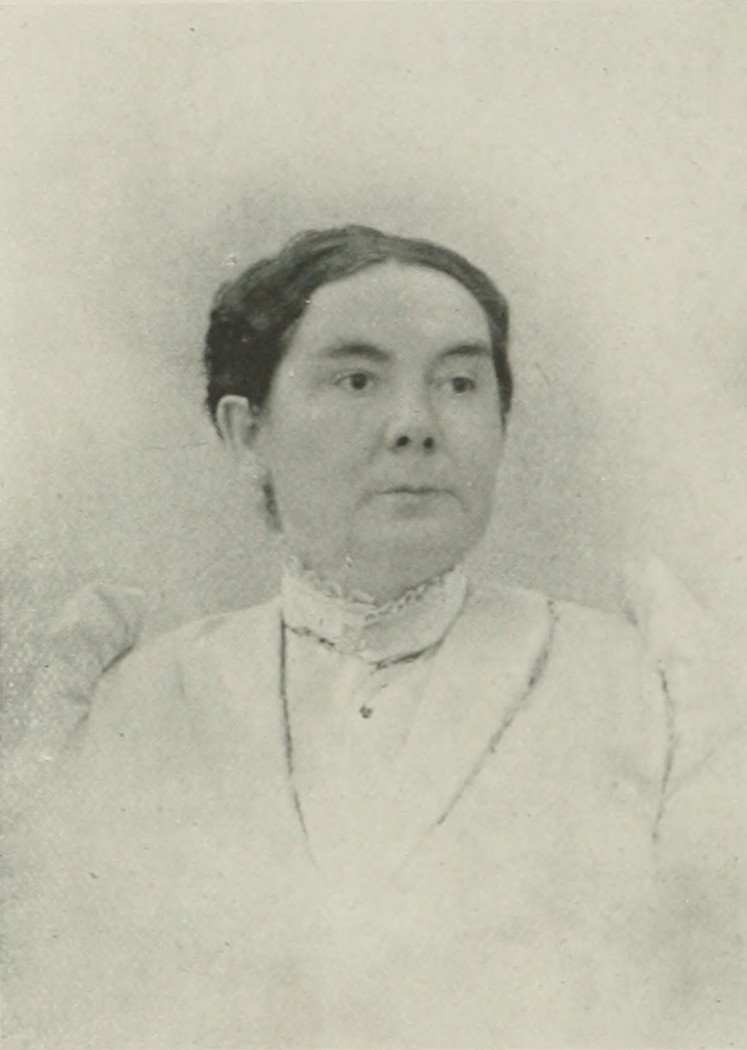
- Born: May 2, 1843; Danville, Vermont, US
- Died: June 23, 1907 (aged 64); Waterbury, Vermont, US
- Occupations: Teacher, Writer, Poet

Mary Eastman Ward (1843–1907) was an American poet born in North Danville, Vermont on 2 May 1843. Her father was Samuel Ward and her mother was Amanda Willard Ward, granddaughter of Rev. Elijah Willard of Dublin, New Hampshire. Rev. Elijah Willard was a minute man and chaplain in the American Revolution.

Mary's mother was her first teacher and she grew up with a love of poetry. She wrote her first poem in the summer following her thirteenth birthday. In her early life, she taught school in Sheffield, Vershire, and Danville. She was also employed at the Vermont Union newspaper office for several years. After leaving those jobs, she devoted her time to writing poetry.

Her poems were included in Poets and Poetry of Vermont. Her poem "The signal lights" appears in Woman in Sacred Song. She also contributed to the St. Johnsbury Republican, Vermont Union, Vermont Chronicle, Golden Rule, and Union Signal.

She died on 23 June 1907 in Waterbury, Vermont. Mary was buried in the Ward family's cemetery, "Ward Cemetery," in Danville, Vermont.
