= Jericho Village Historic District =

Historic district in Vermont, United States

- U.S. National Register of Historic Places
- U.S. Historic district
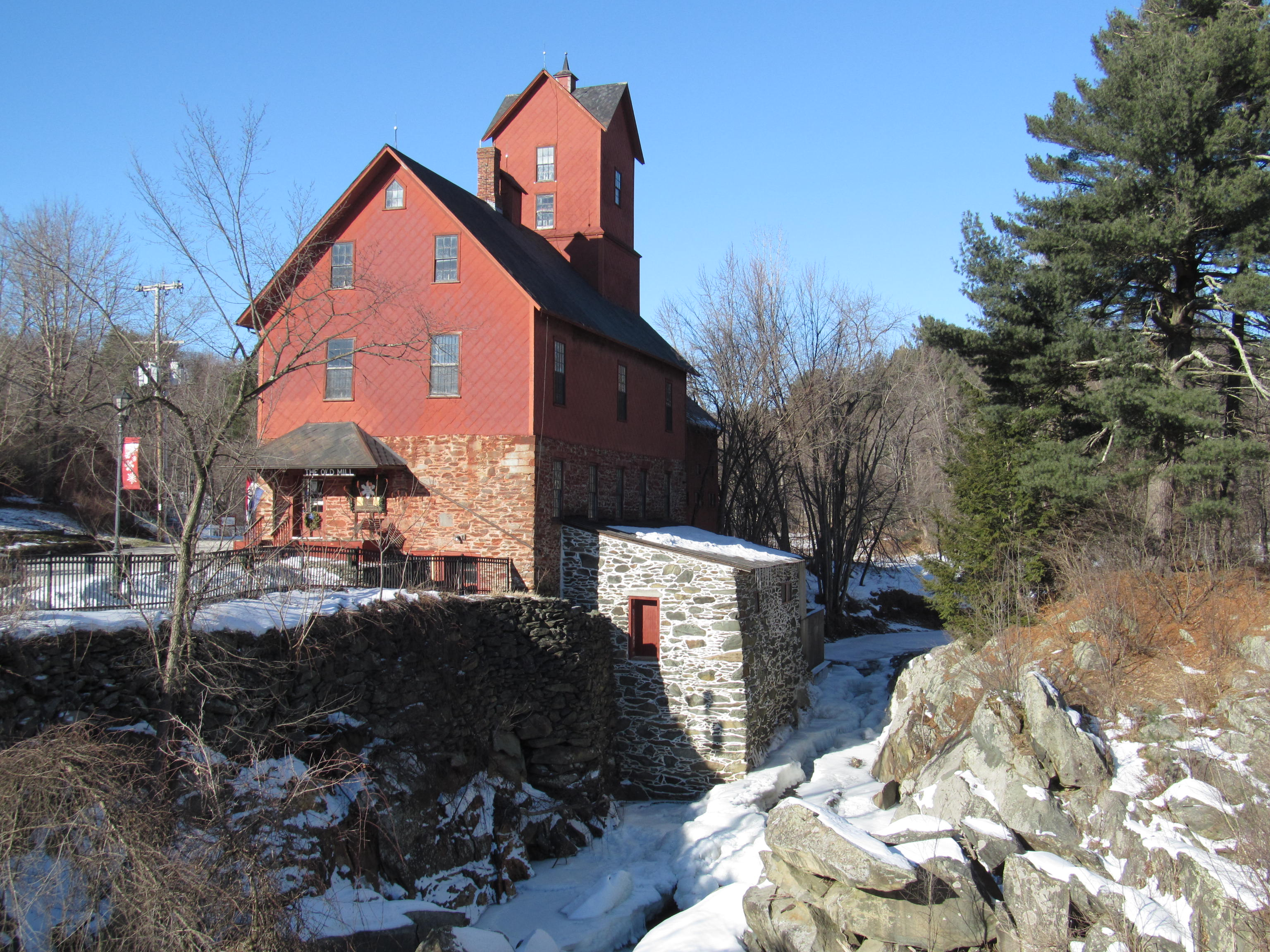

- Location within Vermont Location within the United States
- Location: VT 15, Plains Rd., Mill St. and Old Pump Rd., Jericho, Vermont
- Coordinates: 44°30′15″N 72°59′53″W
- Area: 96 acres (39 ha)
- Built: 1858
- Architectural style: Greek Revival, Italianate, Federal
- NRHP reference No.: 92001533
- Added to NRHP: November 5, 1992

The Jericho Village Historic District encompasses the historic industrial and commercial center of the village of Jericho, Vermont. Stretched along Vermont Route 15 south of Browns River, which powered the village's industries for many years, the village center includes a well-preserved array of 19th and early 20th-century buildings. The district was listed on the National Register of Historic Places in 1992.

== Description and history ==
The village of Jericho was established in the early 19th century around a series of mill privileges on the Browns River, which in the first half of the 19th century were mainly populate by saw and grist mills. Beginning in the 1820s the mills expanded to include woolen textile processing, and in the later 19th century the water power was harnessed for a variety of manufacturing operations, established to capitalize on the areas natural resources. The water-powered industries declined in the early decades of the 20th century, and most of the industrial buildings were torn down or destroyed by fire or flood. Fires also occasionally swept through the built-up areas of the village, but significant elements of its 19th-century form still predominate.

The historic district stretches along Vermont Route 15, which is known as Main Street in the western portion and Church Street in the eastern portion of the district. These two roads meet at a small triangular green, from which Lee River Road and Plains Road extend south. The western boundary of the district is roughly Lawrence Heights, and its eastern boundary roughly Griswold Street. In addition to buildings lining Church and Main Streets, the district includes properties on Lee River Road, Plains Road, and Old Pump Road, and it includes the archaeological remains of the mill complexes on either side of the Browns River, which roughly parallels VT 15. Most of the buildings are wood frame structures, with the brick Congregational Church (1826) and Galusha House (1790) as prominent exceptions. The village's industrial past remains visible in the Old Red Mill and Mill House (a.k.a. the Chittenden Mill), located at the western end of the historic district and now a museum property of the local historical society.

== See also ==
- National Register of Historic Places listings in Chittenden County, Vermont
