= Underhill Flats, Vermont =

Census-designated place in Vermont, United States

- Census-designated place
- Location within Vermont Location within the United States
- Coordinates: 44°31′24″N 72°56′46″W
- Country: United States
- State: Vermont
- County: Chittenden
- Towns: Underhill; Jericho

Area
  - Total: 0.75 sq mi (1.94 km^{2})
  - Land: 0.75 sq mi (1.94 km^{2})
  - Water: 0 sq mi (0.0 km^{2})
- Elevation: 705 ft (215 m)
- Time zone: UTC-5 (Eastern (EST))
  - Summer (DST): UTC-4 (EDT)
- ZIP Codes: 05489 (Underhill); 05465 (Jericho)
- Area code: 802
- FIPS code: 50-74125
- GNIS feature ID: 2807140

Underhill Flats is an unincorporated village and census-designated place (CDP) in the towns of Underhill and Jericho, Chittenden County, Vermont, United States. It was first listed as a CDP before the 2020 census. As of the 2020 census, Underhill Flats had a population of 643.

== Geography ==
The CDP is in northeastern Chittenden County, in the western part of the town of Underhill and the northern part of the town of Jericho. It sits in the valley of The Creek where it flows into the Browns River, which forms the southern border of the CDP. The Browns River is a west- and north-flowing tributary of the Lamoille River, in turn a tributary of Lake Champlain.

Vermont Route 15 passes through Underhill Flats, leading north 11 miles (18 km) to Cambridge and southwest 3 miles (5 km) to Jericho. Underhill Center is 2.5 miles (4.0 km) to the southeast via River Road, and Burlington, the state's largest city, is 17 miles (27 km) to the west-southwest.
