= Stevensville, Vermont =

- Village
- Location within Vermont
- Coordinates: 44°30′18″N 72°51′59″W
- Country: United States
- State: Vermont
- County: Chittenden
- Elevation: 1,145 ft (349 m)
- Time zone: UTC-5 (Eastern (EST))
  - Summer (DST): UTC-4 (EDT)
- Area code: 802
- GNIS feature ID: 1459707

Stevensville is an unincorporated community in the town of Underhill, Chittenden County, Vermont, United States.

== See also ==
- Underhill, Vermont
- Chittenden County, Vermont
- Underhill Center, Vermont
- Underhill Flats, Vermont
