= Stevensville =

Stevensville, the name of several places, may refer to:

Australia

- Stevensville, Victoria

Canada

- Stevensville, Ontario

United States

- Stevensville, Maryland
- Stevensville, Michigan
- Stevensville, Montana
- Stevensville, Pennsylvania
- Stevensville, Vermont
- Stevensville, Virginia
