= Jericho Center Historic District =

Historic district in Vermont, United States

- U.S. National Register of Historic Places
- U.S. Historic district
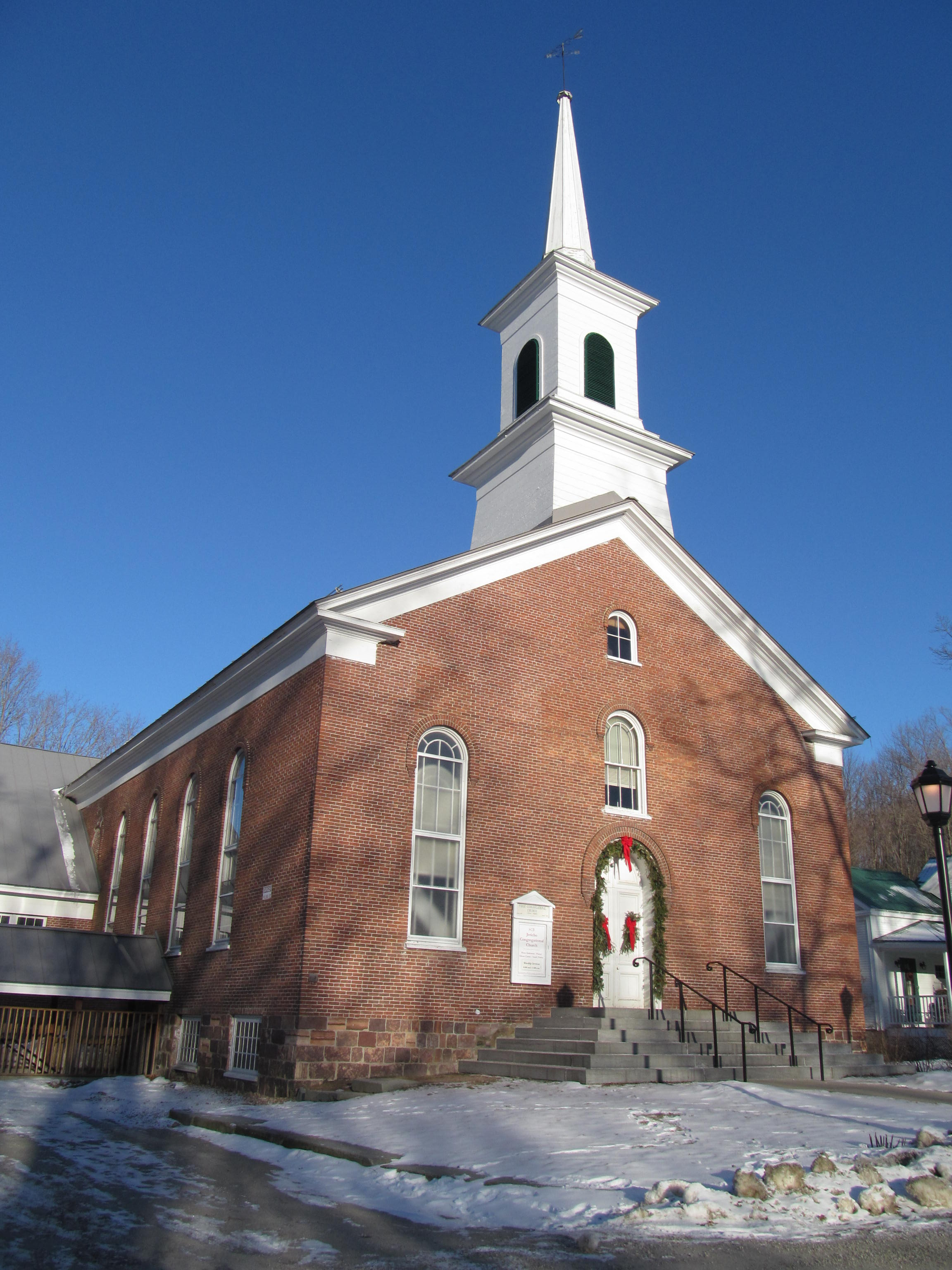

- Location within Vermont Location within the United States
- Location: Brown's Trace, Bolger Hill and Varney Rds., Jericho, Vermont
- Coordinates: 44°28′13″N 72°58′20″W
- Area: 17 acres (6.9 ha)
- Architectural style: Greek Revival, Mixed (more Than 2 Styles From Different Periods)
- NRHP reference No.: 83003207
- Added to NRHP: May 26, 1983

The Jericho Center Historic District encompasses much of the central village of Jericho, Vermont. Centered on the town green at the meeting point of Brown's Trace, Varney Road, and Bolger Hill Road, the center (not to be confused with the incorporated village of Jericho) is a well-preserved Vermont country village developed mainly in the 19th and early 20th centuries. It was listed on the National Register of Historic Places in 1983.

== Description and history ==
The town of Jericho was chartered in 1763, but was not settled until after American independence. The town green which forms the centerpiece of the Jericho Center village was laid out on land donated by early settler Lewis Chapin, on the condition that the town meetinghouse be built there. The village soon grew with the construction of a store and other buildings. The village did not develop as an economic center, lacking water power, and later also railroad connections, but remained viable as a service and civic center for the surrounding rural area. It also benefited from the presence of the Jericho Academy, which provided secondary school from 1825 into the 20th century, and whose surviving building now houses the town library.

The historic district covers 17 acres (6.9 ha), and includes the roughly square town green and all of the buildings facing it. It extends a short way north along Brown's Trace. Most of the buildings are houses between one and 2-1/2 stories in height, in generally vernacular interpretations of architectural styles popular between 1800 and 1920. The Congregational Church is the only brick building; built in 1836 and restyled in 1877, it is a prominent local landmark and a fine example of Federal architecture with Italianate alterations. There are a few buildings that were built as retail commercial spaces, and a few houses have been converted to such use. The oldest buildings, lining the southern side of the green, date to the 1810s.

== See also ==
- National Register of Historic Places listings in Chittenden County, Vermont
