= Old Red Mill and Mill House =

- U.S. National Register of Historic Places
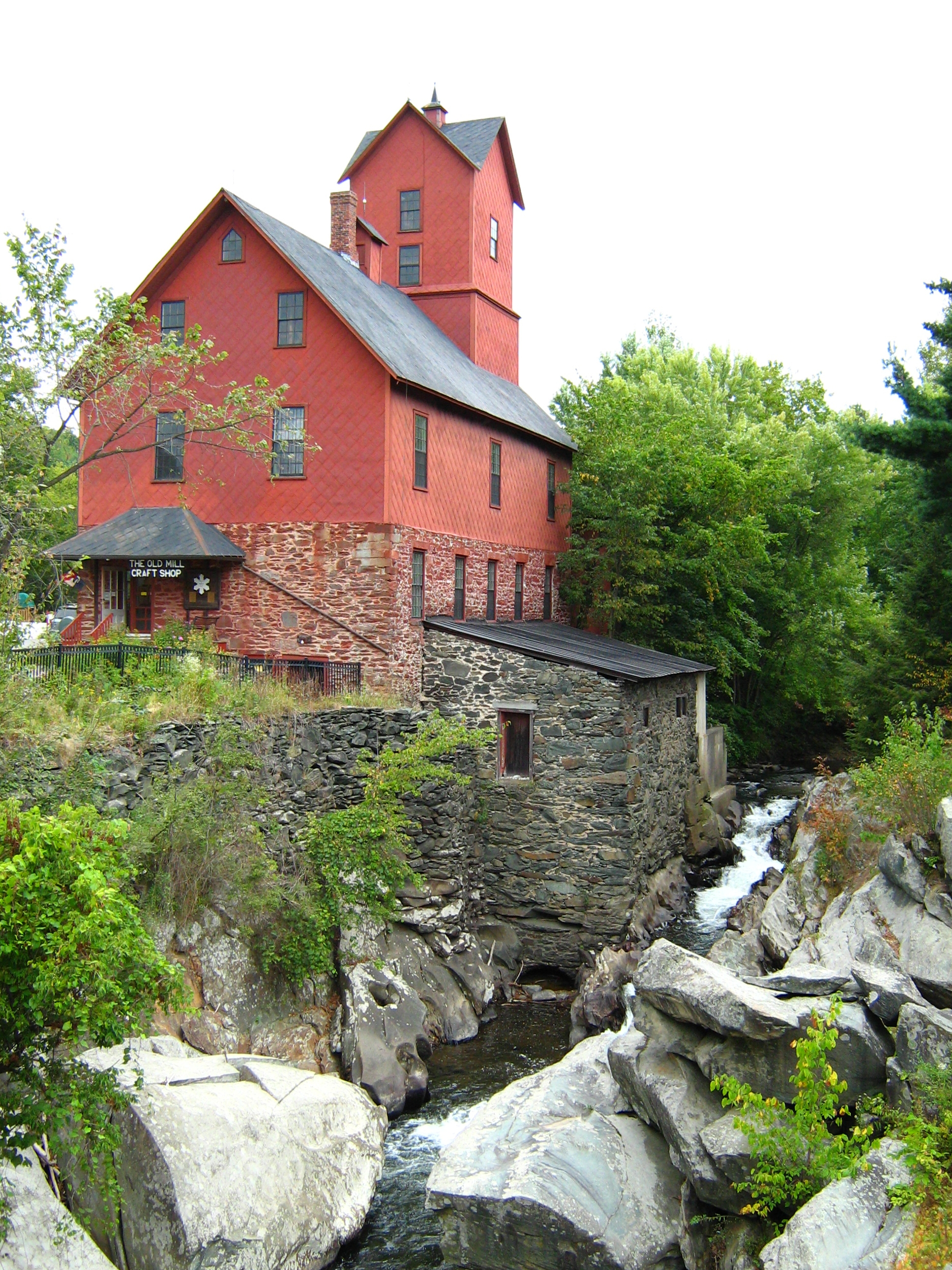

- Location within Vermont Location within the United States
- Location: Red Mill Dr., off VT 15, Jericho, Vermont
- Coordinates: 44°30′17″N 73°0′0″W
- Area: 2 acres (0.81 ha) (original); 1.5 acres (0.61 ha) (size of increase)
- Built: 1859
- Built by: Hutchinson, James
- Architectural style: Vernacular mill, Gothic Revival
- NRHP reference No.: 72000113 (original); 76002245 (increase)

Significant dates
- Added to NRHP: July 31, 1972
- Boundary increase: June 3, 1976

The Old Red Mill and Mill House are a historic 19th-century mill building and residence on Red Mill Drive in Jericho, Vermont. The mill was built in 1856 and enlarged later in the 19th century, accommodating then state-of-the art grain rollers, and was a prominent local business. The house was built in 1859, and is a good local example of Gothic Revival architecture. The mill is now a museum property of the local Jericho Historical Society. The mill building was listed on the National Register of Historic Places in 1972; the listing was expanded to include the house in 1976.

== Description and history ==
The Old Red Mill stands on the west side of the village of Jericho, on the north side of Vermont Route 15 just west of its crossing of the Browns River, which provided the mill's power. The mill is sited on the river's west bank, a short way south of the former site of its mill pond. The house is set to its west, and is separated from it by the access drive to the complex. Both buildings are set on fieldstone foundations, the walls of the mill rising as stone on the first floor and wood framing sheathed in stamped metal plating painted red. It is covered by a gabled roof, and has a square tower at the northeast corner. A shed-roofed wheelhouse projects into the river bed to the east, and the west river bank is lined by a stone retaining wall.

The mill house is a 1-1/2 story wood frame structure, consisting of a main block with two ells extending to the north. The main block has a gabled roof with projecting dormer, as does the first ell, while the second ell is covered by a shed roof. Gable ends have decorative jigsawn vergeboard, and the front porch features turned posts and brackets.

The mill was built in 1856 on an existing mill privilege by James Hutchinson. It was enlarged to its present form in 1885 by L.B. Howe, who installed then-innovate rollers for grinding grain. The mills products were shipped all over New England, and closed in 1946. The mill and house have been adapted into a museum and local history center by the local historical society.

== See also ==
- National Register of Historic Places listings in Chittenden County, Vermont
