= Jericho, Vermont =

- Town
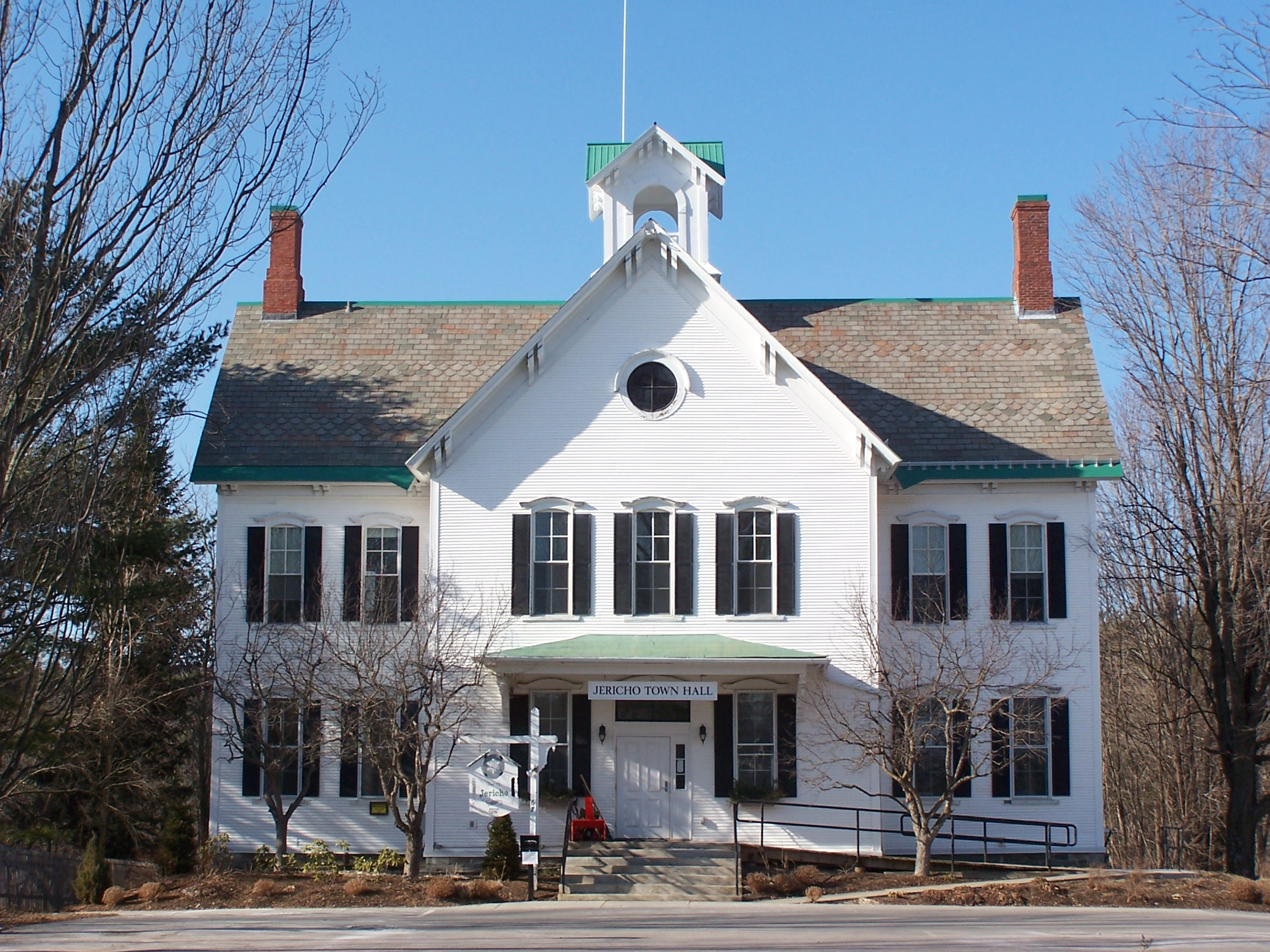
- Jericho town hall (2012)

- Seal

- Location within Chittenden County and Vermont
- Coordinates: 44°29′33″N 72°58′54″W
- Country: United States
- State: Vermont
- County: Chittenden
- Communities: Jericho; Jericho Center; Nashville; Riverside; Underhill Flats (part)

Area
  - Total: 35.6 sq mi (92.1 km^{2})
  - Land: 35.4 sq mi (91.7 km^{2})
  - Water: 0.15 sq mi (0.4 km^{2})
- Elevation: 702 ft (214 m)

Population (2020)
  - Total: 5,104
  - Density: 144/sq mi (55.7/km^{2})
- Time zone: UTC-5 (Eastern (EST))
  - Summer (DST): UTC-4 (EDT)
- ZIP code: 05465
- Area code: 802
- FIPS code: 50-36700
- GNIS feature ID: 1462128
- Website: www.jerichovt.org

Jericho is a town in Chittenden County, Vermont. The population was 5,104 in the 2020 census. The town was named after the ancient city of Jericho.

== History ==
Jericho was formed in 1763 as a grant by New Hampshire governor Benning Wentworth. The first European settlers came from Berkshire County, Massachusetts in 1774.

Ira Allen and Remember Baker surveyed the town of Jericho in 1773 for the Onion River Land Company. A family named Brown were among the first to settle in Jericho in 1774, building a cabin near the Browns River.

In 1776, a detachment of the Continental Army was sent to garrison a blockhouse in Jericho along the Onion (Winooski) River, but they retreated back to Fort Ticonderoga within weeks of their arrival due to fears of British advance south from Canada. The officers involved included Matthew Lyon; they were tried and convicted by court-martial for cowardice and disobeying orders to maintain the post. The location of the Jericho blockhouse is believed to have been along River Road near the intersection with Skunk Hollow.

In 1780, the Brown family were taken captive by a war party of British-allied Mohawks returning to Canada following the Royalton raid.

5,000 acres were removed from southern Jericho in 1794 to form the new town of Richmond, along with lands from Bolton, Huntington, and Williston.

The town's economy developed around logging, agriculture, and milling along the Browns River, where the revitalized Old Red Mill still stands today. Three village centers emerged: Jericho Corners, Jericho Center, and Riverside. From 1876 to 1937 trains on the Burlington and Lamoille Railroad made daily cargo and passenger stops in Jericho, connecting to Essex Junction and Cambridge.

From 1926 into the 1940s, the federal government purchased 5,240 acres of land in Jericho for military purposes; this and adjoining land in Underhill and Bolton now form the Camp Ethan Allen Training Site.

== Geography ==
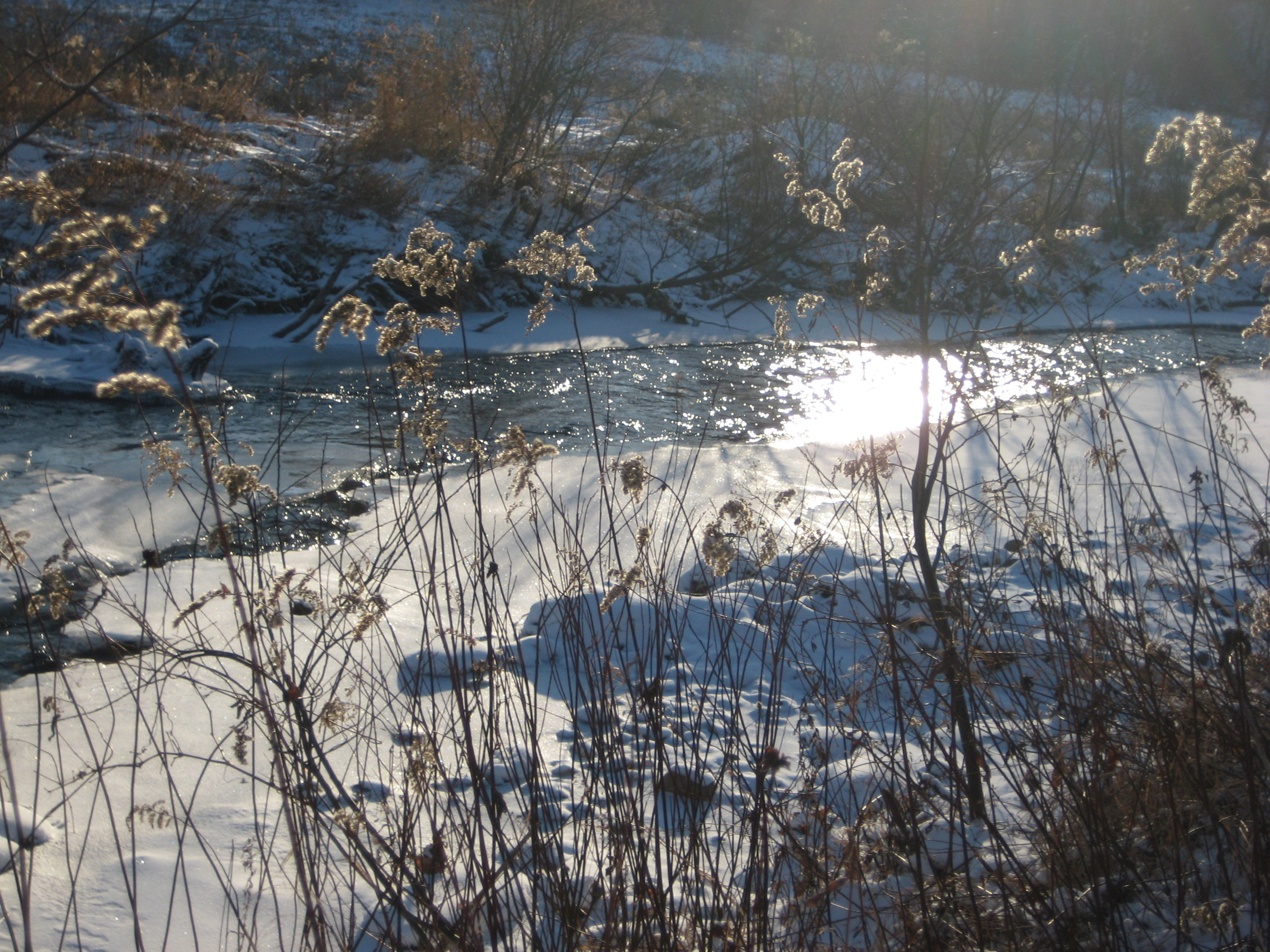
Lee River in Jericho (2008)

According to the United States Census Bureau, the town has a total area of 35.6 square miles (92.1 km^{2}), of which 35.4 square miles (91.7 km^{2}) is land and 0.15 square miles (0.4 km^{2}), or 0.45%, is water.

The town of Jericho has a connection with the neighboring town of Underhill. The area has four distinct village areas. The historic Old Red Mill, home of the Jericho Historical Society, stands in Jericho village (also known as Jericho Corners) on Route 15 in the northwest part of the town, an area that extends from the Browns River crossing eastward to the post office and the Jericho Elementary School. Jericho Corners is the location of the Galusha House, home of Truman Galusha, a brick Federal-style house built in 1790 and like Jericho's Old Red Mill, listed on the National Register of Historic Places.

Jericho's second village, Jericho Center, on Browns Trace, is home to several historic buildings, churches, and Jericho Center Country Store, Vermont's oldest continuously running general store. The Jericho Center Village has a village green, or "Common", a typical park-like center of a Vermont village, surrounded by historic buildings.

Half of the Underhill Flats area on Route 15 is within Jericho. This area features the multi-use Mills Riverside Park and two general stores (Jolley & Jacob's).

Underhill Center in the town of Underhill has one general store, as well as St. Thomas Catholic Church, a small postal office, and access to Underhill State Park.

Jericho is home to the Chittenden East Wolverines of the Northern Vermont Youth Football League, Cub Scout Pack 620, and one of Vermont's oldest and largest Boy Scout troops, Troop 627.

The two towns share the Underhill-Jericho Fire Department.

As of 2024, close to 48% of the town's land is in public ownership or under conservation. The town's highpoint is Bald Hill, at over 1,900 feet (580 m). Jericho's bedrock is primarily Cambrian mudstone. The town is divided nearly 50-50 between the Winooski and Lamoille watersheds.

== Demographics ==
Historical population
Census	Pop.	Note	%±
1790	381		—
1800	728		91.1%
1810	1,185		62.8%
1820	1,219		2.9%
1830	1,654		35.7%
1840	1,684		1.8%
1850	1,837		9.1%
1860	1,669		−9.1%
1870	1,757		5.3%
1880	1,687		−4.0%
1890	1,461		−13.4%
1900	1,373		−6.0%
1910	1,307		−4.8%
1920	1,138		−12.9%
1930	1,091		−4.1%
1940	1,077		−1.3%
1950	1,135		5.4%
1960	1,425		25.6%
1970	2,343		64.4%
1980	3,575		52.6%
1990	4,302		20.3%
2000	5,015		16.6%
2010	5,009		−0.1%
2020	5,104		1.9%
U.S. Decennial Census

As of the census of 2000, there were 5,015 people, 1,751 households, and 1,402 families residing in the town. The population density was 141.7 people per square mile (54.7/km^{2}). There were 1,774 housing units at an average density of 50.1 per square mile (19.4/km^{2}). The racial makeup of the town was 97.45% White, 0.68% Black or African American, 0.14% Native American, 0.56% Asian, 0.08% Pacific Islander, 0.30% from other races, and 0.80% from two or more races. Hispanic or Latino of any race were 1.12% of the population.

There were 1,751 households, out of which 45.9% had children under the age of 18 living with them, 70.4% were married couples living together, 7.1% had a female householder with no husband present, and 19.9% were non-families. 14.3% of all households were made up of individuals, and 4.3% had someone living alone who was 65 years of age or older. The average household size was 2.86 and the average family size was 3.19.

In the town, the population was spread out, with 30.9% under the age of 18, 4.6% from 18 to 24, 31.7% from 25 to 44, 26.4% from 45 to 64, and 6.4% who were 65 years of age or older. The median age was 37 years. For every 100 females, there were 98.1 males. For every 100 females age 18 and over, there were 92.6 males.

The median income for a household in the town was $65,375, and the median income for a family was $72,500. Males had a median income of $49,375 versus $30,488 for females. The per capita income for the town was $24,941. About 3.6% of families and 4.6% of the population were below the poverty line, including 6.2% of those under age 18 and 3.7% of those age 65 or over.

== Economy ==
As of 2019, over two thirds of Jericho residents work within Chittenden County, with 18% working in Burlington and 7.6% in Jericho itself. 17% of residents work from home. 81% of workers commute to work by car, including 7.7% who carpool. Less than 1% commute by public transportation.

There are 97 registered businesses in Jericho as of 2022, with average gross sales of just over $500,000.

== Transportation ==
Two state highways pass through Jericho: VT-15 and VT-117. Green Mountain Transit bus route 36 formerly passed through Jericho, until its closure in 2025.

Approximately 53% of Jericho's 64 miles of town-maintained roadways are gravel, with the remaining 47% being paved.

Villeneuve Field (VT72) is a private civil airport located in Jericho.

== Education ==
Schools fall under the umbrella of the Mount Mansfield Modified Union School District. Local school includes Jericho Elementary School serving from kindergarten through fourth grade. Browns River Middle School teaches grades five through eight. There is one high school in Jericho—Mount Mansfield Union High School—which serves students from Jericho, Underhill, Richmond, Huntington, and Bolton.

Students from Mount Mansfield Union High School are allowed to apply to a vocational school for their junior and senior years. They can apply to either The Center for Technology, Essex (CTE), or the Burlington Technical Center (BTC). CTE is located in Essex Junction and is part of the larger Essex High School (EHS).

MMU has 814 students enrolled as of 2018, making it the eighth most enrolled school in Vermont.

On November 4, 2014, the communities of Bolton, Jericho, Richmond, Underhill ID and Underhill Town voted to form the Mount Mansfield Modified Union School District also known as the MMMUSD. On June 6, 2019, MMUUSD voted to also include the town of Huntington. This school district serves and governs the current town school districts of Bolton (Smilie Memorial School), Huntington (Brewster Pierce Memorial Elementary), Jericho (Jericho Elementary), Richmond (Richmond Elementary), and Underhill (Underhill Central School), Mt Mansfield Union School District (Browns River Middle, Camels Hump Middle and Mt. Mansfield Union High Schools) in grades Pre-K through 12.

== Notable people ==
- Wilson "Snowflake" Bentley (1865–1931), farmer who photographed over five thousand snow crystals
- Lea Davison, Olympic athlete
- Mary Fletcher, philanthropist who founded the future University of Vermont Medical Center
- William B. Gray, United States attorney for Vermont
- Heman Lowry, U.S. marshal for Vermont
- Anson Rood (1827–1898), Wisconsin State assemblyman and businessman
- Alfred A. Starbird (1875–1956), US Army brigadier general

== In popular culture ==
A fictitious version of Jericho is the setting of the 2022 TV series Wednesday based on the character from The Addams Family.
