= Galusha House =

Historic house in Vermont, United States

- U.S. National Register of Historic Places
- U.S. Historic district – Contributing property
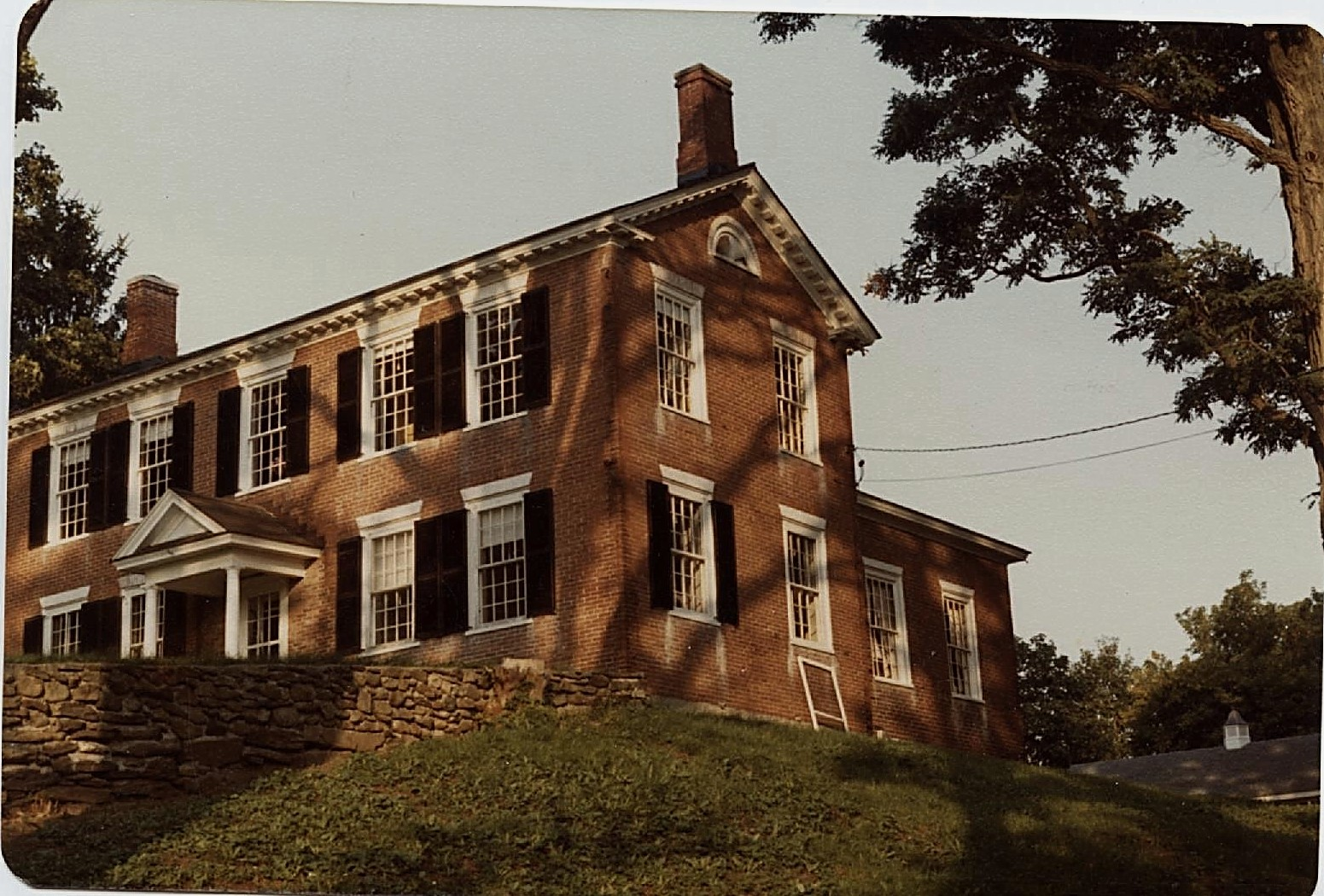

- Location within Vermont Location within the United States
- Location: Lee River Rd. at VT 15, Jericho, Vermont
- Coordinates: 44°30′12″N 72°59′48″W
- Area: 2.6 acres (1.1 ha)
- Built: 1790
- Architectural style: Federal
- Part of: Jericho Village Historic District (ID92001533)
- NRHP reference No.: 78000232

Significant dates
- Added to NRHP: October 10, 1978
- Designated CP: November 5, 1992

The Truman Galusha House, also called the Truman Galusha Mansion and "Fairview" in various historical documents and maps, is a Federal-style house in Jericho, Vermont, United States. It was listed on the National Register of Historic Places in 1978 as the Galusha House, qualifying for designation based on its "architectural excellence" and the association of its early owners with important early governors and other key leaders involved with the creation of the state of Vermont. It was built in 1790, and is named for the son of an early Vermont governor, Jonas Galusha. The house is located at the top of a large sloping lawn at the junction of Vermont Route 15 and Lee River Road at the entrance to Jericho Corners Village in the village of Jericho, Vermont, which is near Burlington. It was completely restored in 1982, and is privately owned.

== Galusha family ==
Truman Galusha, Hist. of Jericho, Vt, p.480.

Truman Galusha (1786 – 1859) was the son of Vermont's early governor, Jonas Galusha, of Shaftsbury and his second wife, Mary Chittenden, the daughter of Thomas Chittenden. Chittenden, Truman Galusha's grandfather, was a close associate of Ethan Allen, Vermont's Revolutionary Hero, and other Allen family members. With them, he was part of the group who drafted a Vermont Constitution, and declared the Vermont Republic in 1777, the first written Constitution for an independent republic in North America. The Vermont Republic is sometimes called "The Green Mountain Republic" today. Chittenden was chosen as the Republic of Vermont's "President," then later "Governor," and after statehood in 1791, elected the state's first governor, serving until 1797.

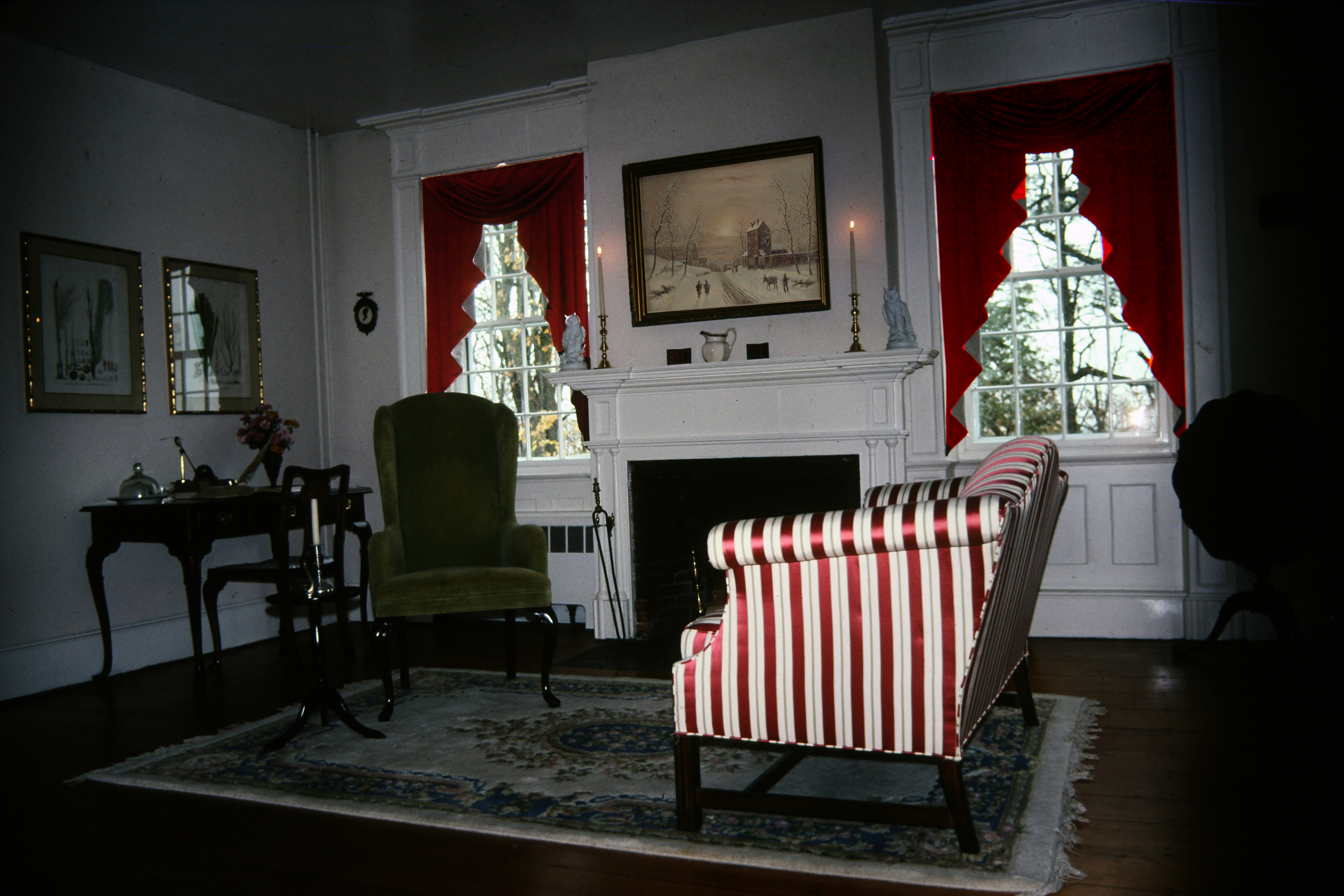
Front Parlor w/original Federal woodwork in ceiling to floor window surrounds, with flaring tops matching mantel.

Jonas Galusha, Truman's father, was elected to nine one-year terms as governor, beginning in 1809. Truman's boyhood home, usually called "The Governor Jonas Galusha Homestead" in Center Shaftsbury, VT, is also listed on the National Register, and is now the headquarters of the Shaftsbury Historical Society. (See photo of the homestead on the Shaftsbury Historical Society's homepage.)

Truman had six children with two wives: He married (1) Lydia Loomis, and (2) Hannah Chittenden, a granddaughter of Thomas and daughter of his mother's brother, Noah Chittenden. Truman Galusha did not build this house, but was its most famous resident. A drawing of the house appears with other important buildings on a large wall map of the county done in 1857 by H F Walling, captioned, "Residence of Hon. Truman Galusha" (See photo, below, left.) The 1869 Atlas of Chittenden Co. by F. W. Beers and Co. describes the house's name as "FAIRVIEW", all in capital letters. The atlas also shows the house occupant as R. L. Galusha, which is Truman's son, Russell Loomis Galusha. The house is included in "Look Around Chittenden County, Vermont", a book featuring the county's historic homes, published by the Chittenden Co. Historical Society in 1976.

Truman was "a farmer, banker, and one of the wealthiest and most prominent citizens of the town", according to the History of Jericho, VT (ed. by Chauncey H. Hayden et al., 1916) He was elected to many offices in town and state. The Galushas were ardent Baptists, and Truman was "always a supporter" and major contributor to the Baptist Church in Jericho.

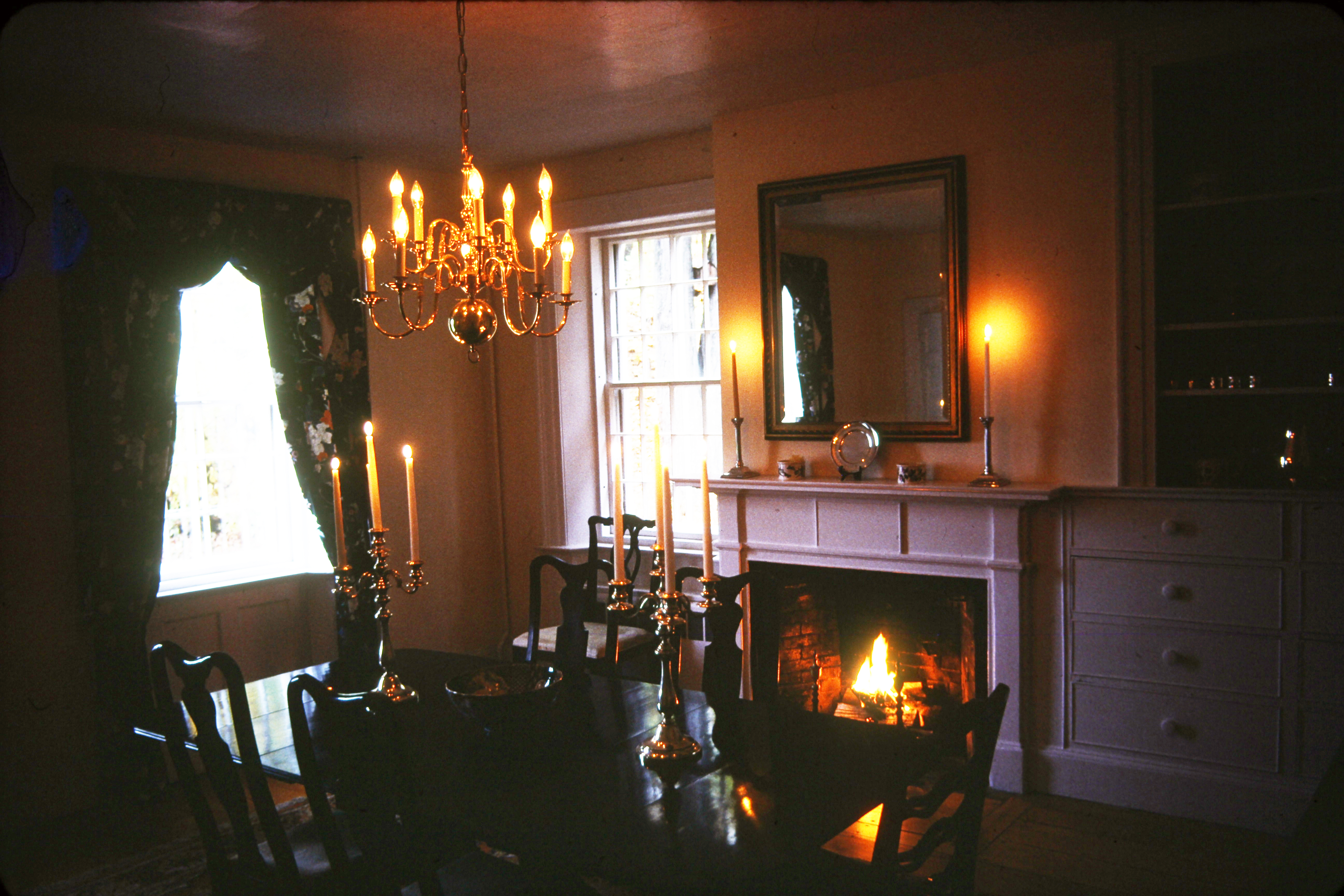
Dining Room at Galusha House during restoration, 1982, by candlelight, showing original Rumford fireplace.

As a neighbor and leader, he is characterized in the town history as a kind, friendly man. One anecdote that reflects his dedication to the residents of Jericho is about a young man named Arthur Burdick, son of a Jericho farmer. When Burdick was just 19 and had spent three years as a carpenter's apprentice, he became interested in going to California to join the Gold Rush. The history says, "Arthur Burdick had a severe case of 'Gold Fever,' then epidemically raging...and thought that he, too, ought to seek his fortune there." His story is told in a long letter Mr. Burdick wrote later which is reproduced in the history. "I gathered the money I had saved. The sum was not great, not much over one hundred dollars. I asked my father to sign a note with me to Deacon Truman Galusha for two hundred dollars. I knew Galusha would let me have the money, for I had gotten into his good graces while building a house for him and his son. Father said 'Yes, I will do it, for it is probably the last thing I can ever do for you.' and we obtained the money. I packed my grip, and with the old white mare, father drove me to Burlington where I bade him goodbye." The history is silent on whether Arthur Burdick struck gold, but it makes it clear "Deacon Galusha" was more than willing to encourage him.

Abby Maria Hemenway, Vermont's famous "gazetteer", after her visit to Jericho, wrote about Truman Galusha. "He was one of the most prominent citizens and the wealthiest man in town. He occupied the most responsible civil stations in town and county."

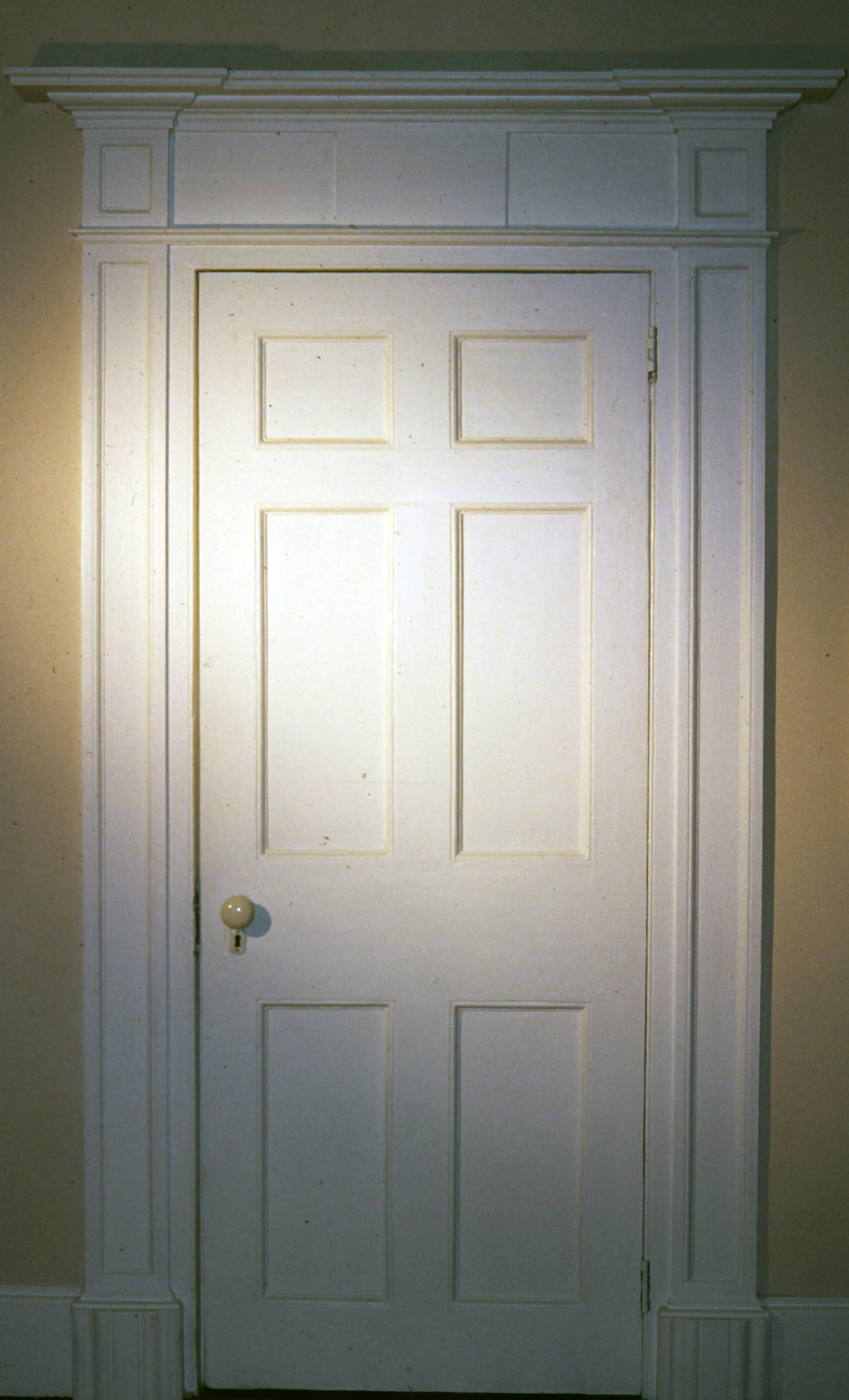
One of the front parlor doors, showing typical Federal style door surround with flaring-topped pilasters and frieze with center panel, matching mantels.

Truman Galusha was Representative to the Vermont State Conventions in 1827, 1828, and 1830. He represented Jericho in the important Vermont Constitutional Convention of 1836 which ended the unicameral legislature and established the state senate. He was chosen again as representative to the State Constitutional Convention in 1843. He also served as "Side Judge" of Chittenden County in 1849 through 1851.

The Galusha family was a prominent family in Vermont’s early history and was actively involved in the abolitionist movement in later years. One of Truman's brothers, Elon Galusha, (1790 – 1856) was the first president of the Baptist Anti-Slavery Society, promoted the Liberty Party, and became known for preaching on the evils of slavery throughout his entire life.

== The house ==
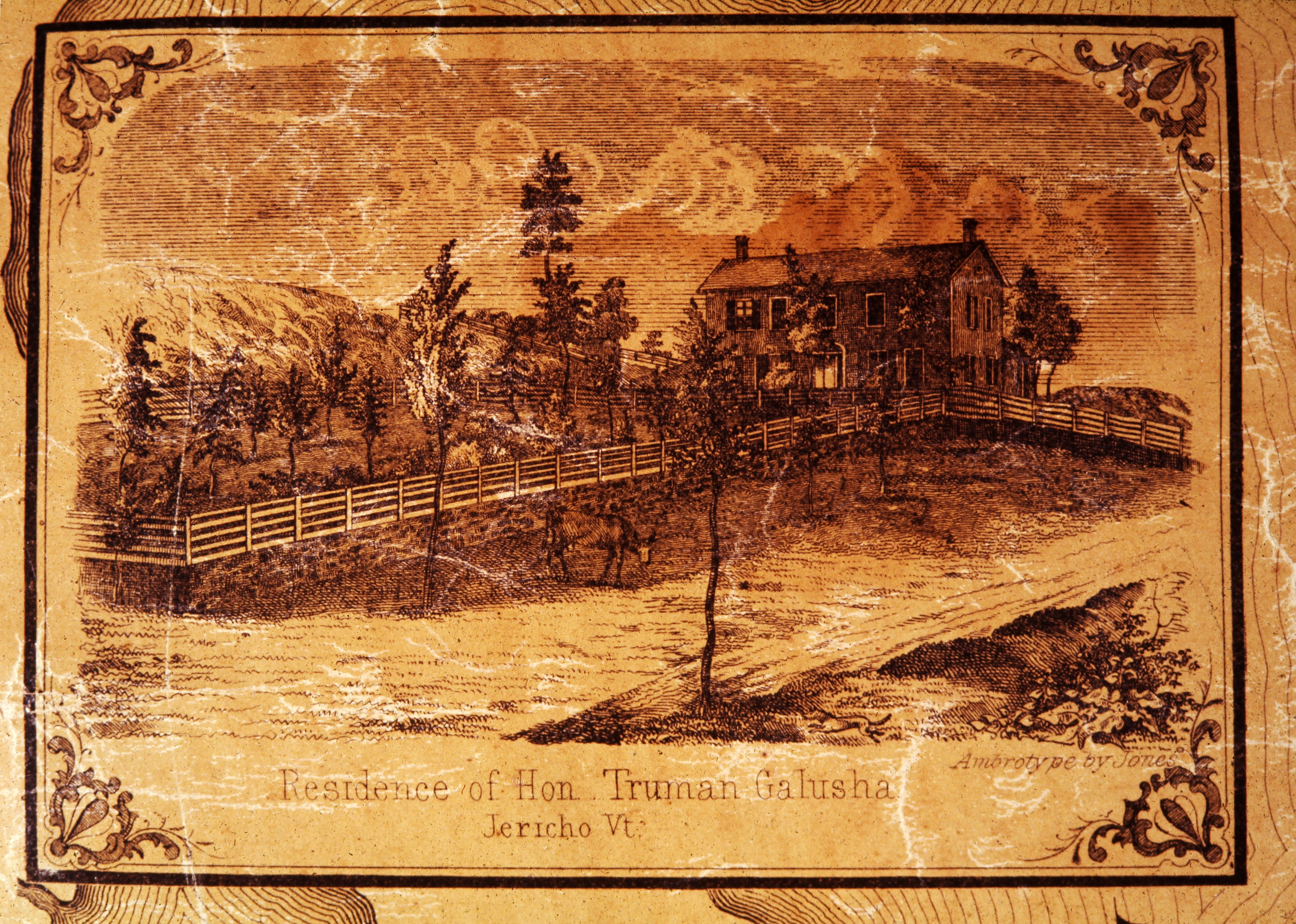
Drawing of Fairview from the illustrated border of large Wall Map of Chittenden Co, published in 1857 by H F Walling. Caption reads "Residence of Hon. Truman Galusha"

The Truman Galusha House is one of Vermont's few purely Federal houses, and features rare original details, especially for early Vermont, since most early homes in Vermont are considered "country" in style, with simplified versions of the more sophisticated work done in the colonial cities. Architect Herbert Wheaton Congdon, in his classic work, "Old Vermont Houses,1763-1850" reminds readers that Vermont was the youngest state in New England, and "Pioneer folk, busy in field or forest, did not need the stately homes such as their contemporaries in other states built on the High Streets of their wealthy mercantile towns."

Yet the builder of this house (unknown), working very early in Vermont, managed to create some very up-to-date Federal details which thankfully are all unchanged and original today. The Truman Galusha House's main Federal features on the exterior are the well-worked cornice with dentils under the eaves, and a delicate Palladian fanscreen in the high gable end. On the interior. the house features original, elaborate woodwork in the front parlor and elsewhere. Large Federal-style overdoors and overwindows adorn all windows and doors in the parlor. The same treatment of the door surrounds appears in the facing doors in the front hall. They are less elaborately carved, but identical in design as those in many famous Federal homes, such as the Gardner-Pingree House in Salem, MA (1804). There are four original "Rumford" fireplaces, all with original mantels and woodwork. (Parlor, dining room, and two front bedrooms upstairs.) A Rumford fireplace is the then-popular tall, shallow fireplace invented by Benjamin Thompson, or Count Rumford, a loyalist physicist who fled to Europe after the Revolution where he was made a Count.

The front door is not original. It was originally topped by a classic fanlight and sidelights. The small portico now above the door in front was added when the original door was sold during the 1930s, according to town legend.

The oldest part of the house (built in 1790, one year before Vermont joined the union as the 14th state) may have been built by John Bliss, who was an early owner of the house and also owned the Jericho Red Mill, (now home of the Jericho Historical Society) which is across the main road from the house. (Truman Galusha was also a part owner of the mill during his residence in Jericho.) Jericho's Old Red Mill, sometimes called Chittenden Mills, and its waterfall on Brown's River, is one of Vermont's most famous scenic sights. It has been featured in scores of Vermont calendars and magazines.

The large Federal front part of the house was added in 1809. Both the 1790 and 1809 sections of the house are of brick. Galusha moved to Jericho in 1824 and the house was occupied by him and his descendants (including the Howe family, two of whom married Truman's daughters.) into the 1930s.

The small brick home now at the bottom of the lawn at the roadside was once the servant's quarters for the Truman Galusha house.

== Brick houses in Vermont ==
Herbert Wheaton Congdon, architect and author of a definitive book on antique houses in Vermont, "Old Vermont Houses, 1763-1850" in the chapter, "Brick Houses", states that brick houses are somewhat rare in Vermont. "In a heavily forested country like ours, masonry houses are not common. Most Green Mountain farmers are lumbermen for part of the year. Carpentry is as natural to them as agriculture. Laying brick is a specialized craft." (p. 63) The book profiles various brick houses in the state, with photos and descriptions, starting with one in Arlington, VT that Congdon says "may be the oldest brick house in Vermont, continuously lived in since its erection, built 1779." (p. 65) This dates the Truman Galusha House as one of the earliest brick houses in Vermont, built only eleven years later in 1790, one year before statehood. For historical perspective, the older part of the Galusha House was built only one year after George Washington became President (1789-1797), and the newer front section, during the last year of the Thomas Jefferson presidency (1801-1809). Thomas Jefferson, himself an architect, was one of the major influences in the development of the Federal style.

== Restoration and public house tour ==
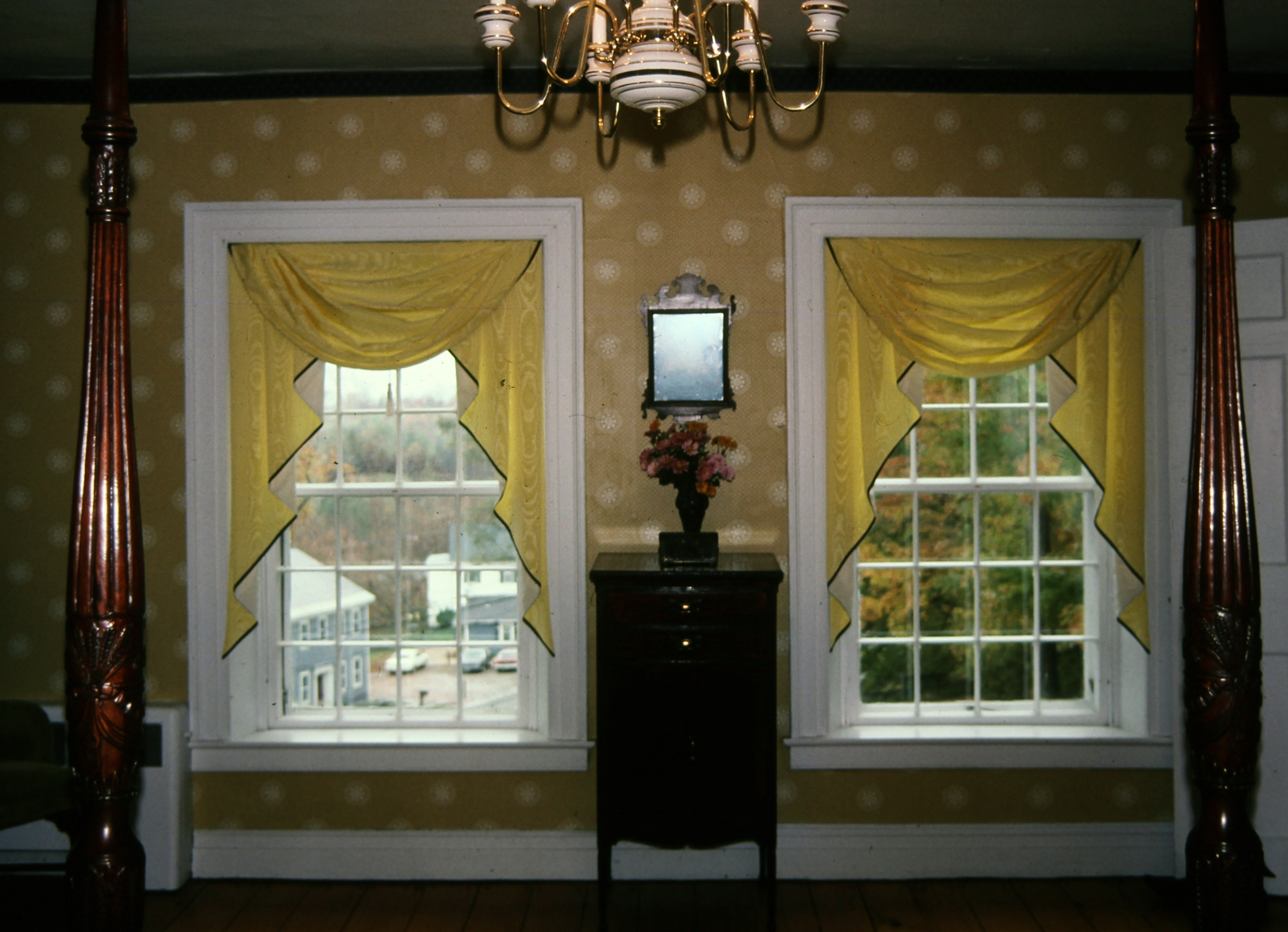
View from the front windows of upstairs Master Bedroom, showing village below.

The house, then in very bad repair, was completely and carefully restored in 1981–82. All wide board floors were repaired and retained. All woodwork was stripped and repainted in white. All rooms were painted in colors from the Historic Charleston Paint color collection. Handmade hardware (door latches, etc.) found in the oldest section was preserved. Some early French wallpaper, found behind broken plaster was documented and dated by the Society for the Preservation of New England Antiquities in Boston. All the bricks used in the house were handmade on site, and are somewhat smaller than modern bricks. The two high, English stack chimneys, with their decorative cornices, were restored and re-pointed. (One was broken down several feet.)

Forty handmade window sashes with 12-over-12 lights, based on one original in the house, were expertly handmade by restoration craftsman, Jerry Bates, and installed with brass runners. Reproduction historic wallpapers were used throughout, including Williamsburg patterns of the period in the front stairwell. Historically documented antique reproduction handmade lighting fixtures from Ball and Ball in Pennsylvania were installed in the stairwell and other rooms. An entire new kitchen was installed, and the ceiling in the wooden ell at the back of the house was removed creating a cathedral ceilinged family room with loft. Bathrooms were completely replaced. Reproduction draperies from museum patterns were custom made for each room by historic fabric specialist, Lael Livak. Fine interior custom carpentry was by Sandy Packard. Plastering was done by Vermont's veteran master-plasterer, Willy Verchereau.(Restoration details are from flyer printed for house tour in 1982.)

The restoration took 14 months. When finished, the house was featured as part of the Jericho Historical Society's annual House Tours on "Historic Jericho Day" in August, 1982. After a feature article in the Burlington Free Press promoting the tours, on August 14, 1982, hundreds of people lined up across the lawn to visit the prominent house on Rt. 15 that had been in such bad repair for so many years.

== Underground Railroad ==
Governor Jonas Galusha's home in southern Vermont (Shaftsbury) was known as a stop on the Underground Railroad. The Truman Galusha House, in northern Vermont, was also a stop for escaping slaves bound for Canada, and has a trap door giving access to space under the floors, which is said to have once led to a tunnel.

== Chittenden houses in Jericho ==
The intermarriages of the Chittenden and Galusha families during early Vermont history resulted in the building of several very important early homes in Jericho, the Truman Galusha House being only one of them. His grandfather, Thomas Chittenden, Vermont's first governor (and the father of Truman's mother, Mary Chittenden) made his family home in Williston, VT, just across the wide Winooski River from Jericho. That winding river has a massive floodplain on the Jericho side which has created some of the richest farmland in the state.

Thomas Chittenden had 10 children, and during his old age, decided to build two large houses on the Jericho side of the river as wedding gifts for two of his sons, both of whom had become important Vermonters—Noah Chittenden (1753-1835) who was a farmer, judge, and the first sheriff of Chittenden County, and Martin Chittenden (1769-1840) who was also a judge, Congressman, and the governor of Vermont for two terms. Of course, both were brothers of Truman Galusha's mother, Mary Chittenden. And to make things even more confusing, Noah Chittenden was the father of Truman Galusha's second wife, Hannah Chittenden; they were first cousins.

Legend says the two houses were identical, several miles apart along the river, both with extensive farmland. One (originally the home of Noah Chittenden) burned in 1885, but the one built for Martin still stands, and is one of the most magnificent and well-preserved mansions among old Vermont Houses.

Herbert Congdon, in "Old Vermont Houses", calls the mansion the "Chittenden-Hasbrook House, since a family named Hasbrook owned it when he wrote his book in the 1930s; he pegged the building date at c1796. Today it is still privately owned, and is usually called the Martin Chittenden House. The two houses have always been famous for their elegant and unique "checkerboard" brickwork in exterior end walls, which was laid in "patterned Flemish Bond".

A biography of Truman Galusha explains that he and his family purchased the Noah Chittenden house and lived there several years before buying the house that is the subject of this article.

The Truman Galusha house is not open to the public, but more information about it can be obtained from the Jericho Historical Society.

== See also ==
- National Register of Historic Places listings in Chittenden County, Vermont
