= Underhill State Park =

State park in Chittenden County, Vermont

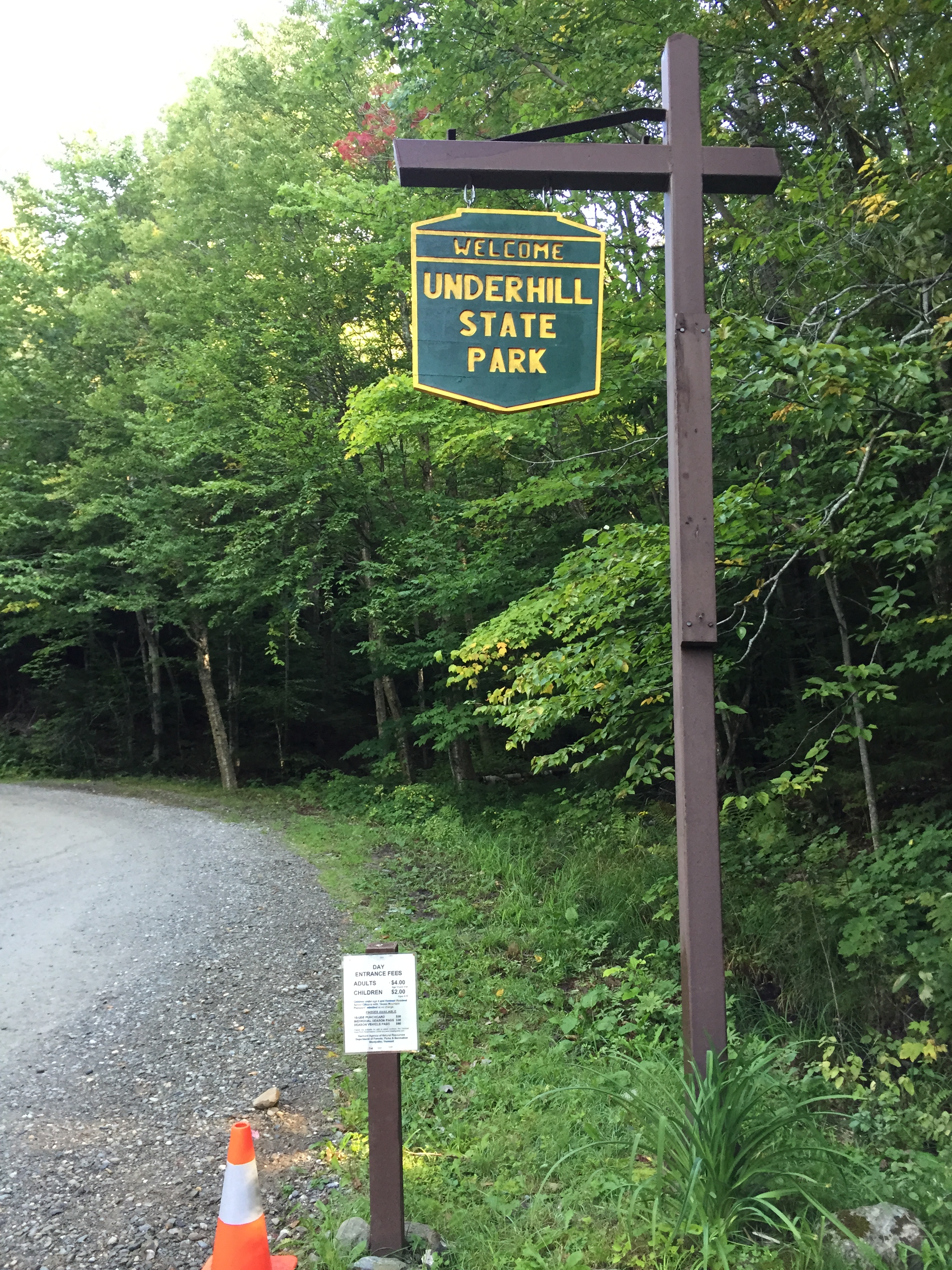
- Interactive map of Underhill State Park
- Type: State park
- Location: 352 Mountain Road; Underhill, Vermont
- Coordinates: 44.5305°N 72.8331°W
- Area: 250 acres (100 ha)
- Operator: Vermont Department of Forests, Parks, and Recreation
- Open: Memorial Day Weekend - Mid-October
- Website: https://vtstateparks.com/underhill.html

Underhill State Park is a state park in Underhill, Vermont. It is situated on the west slope of 4,300 feet Mount Mansfield, in the 39,837-acre Mount Mansfield State Forest. Activities includes hiking, camping, mountain biking, stream fishing, wildlife watching, and picnicking. Facilities include group and individual camping areas, a picnic shelter, and hiking trails. The park is formally open between Memorial Day weekend and Columbus Day weekend, but is accessible for periods outside those times; fees are charged. Much of the park's infrastructure was built by the Civilian Conservation Corps (CCC) in the 1930s; these facilities were listed on the National Register of Historic Places in 2002.

== Features ==
Underhill State Park is located in eastern Underhill, about 4 miles (6.4 km) east of the town center. It occupies a portion of the western flank of Mount Mansfield, including a significant portion of the highest summit ridge (roughly between "The Nose" and "The Chin"). The developed facilities of the park are divided into a lower and upper area. The lower area is centered around the ranger station, and includes a parking area, picnic area, and a small number of walk-in tent and leanto camping sites. From this point a CCC-built road winds up the hill to the upper area, which is a small group camping area with seven leantos and two tent sites. Both areas are equipped with restrooms that provide flush toilets and cold running water. The picnic area includes a CCC-built shelter and fireplaces.

There are four hiking trails to the summit ridge of Mount Mansfield. The Sunset Ridge Trail is 3 miles (4.8 km) to the summit, and is the most direct route. The Long Trail traverses the summit ridge.

The park facilities are open between the weekends of Memorial and Columbus Day. The main gate is left open thereafter until the first snow, and is reopened after enough snow has fallen to make cross-country skiing possible.

== History ==
The west side of Mount Mansfield has been a tourist destination since the mid-19th century. In 1858 a small hotel called The Halfway House was built in what is now the park, providing lodging and stabling for tourists seeking to ascend the mountain. The hotel was demolished in 1939, and only its foundation remains. The park was established by the state in 1933, and much of its infrastructure was developed between then and 1940 by the CCC, which had a work crew based here. The CCC improved the road to the park, constructed the road to the upper area, and built some of the leantos in the upper campground, the picnic lodge, the comfort facilities, and the ranger station and quarters. Its crews also planted groves of Norway spruce. The well-preserved nature of these facilities prompted their listing on the National Register of Historic Places in 2002.

== See also ==
- National Register of Historic Places listings in Chittenden County, Vermont
