= Underhill Center, Vermont =

Census-designated place in Vermont, United States

- Census-designated place
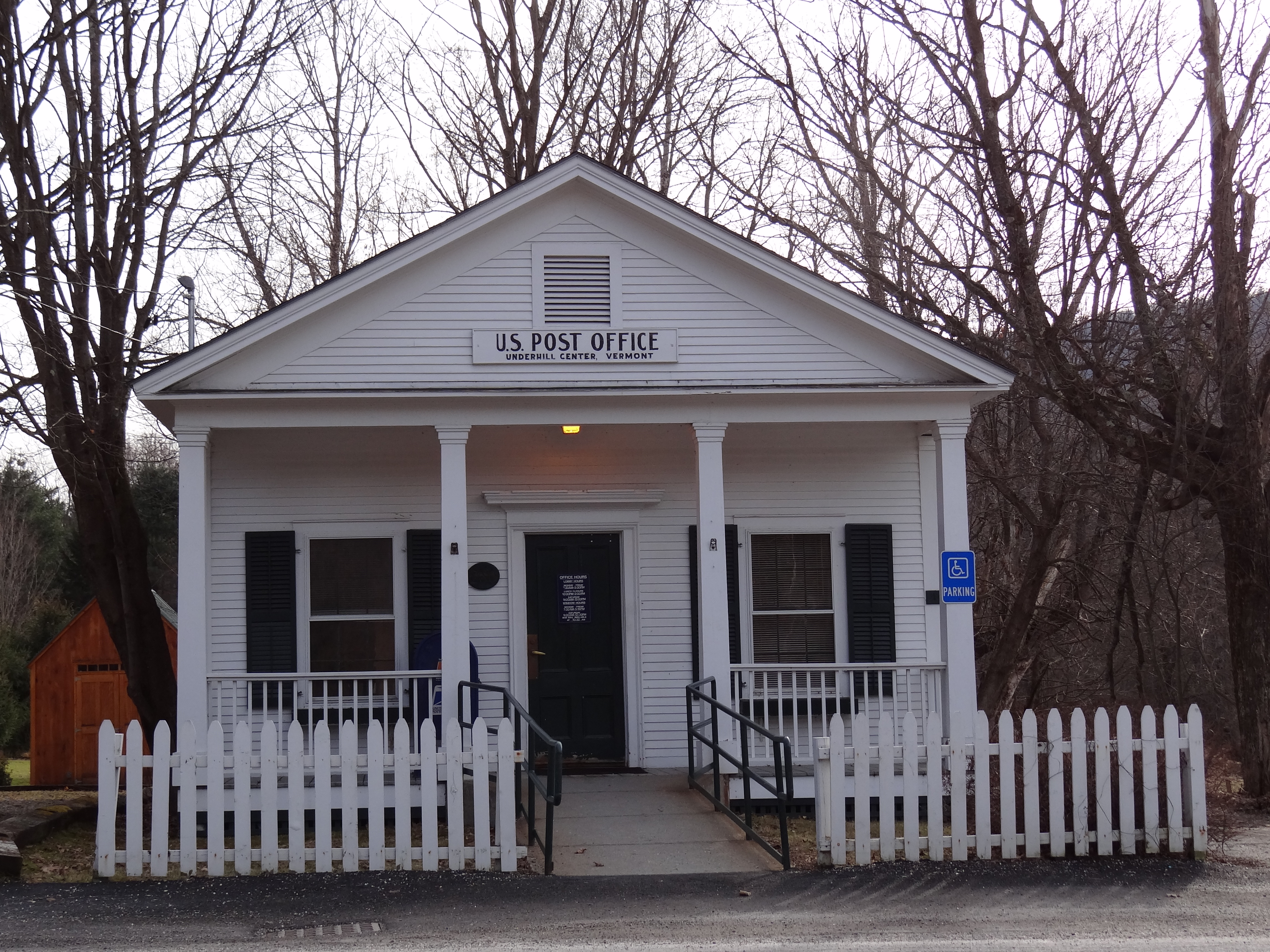
- Post office in Underhill Center

- Location within Vermont Location within the United States
- Coordinates: 44°30′29″N 72°53′55″W
- Country: United States
- State: Vermont
- County: Chittenden
- Elevation: 791 ft (241 m)

Population (2020)
  - Total: 142
- Time zone: UTC-5 (Eastern (EST))
  - Summer (DST): UTC-4 (EDT)
- ZIP code: 05490
- Area code: 802
- GNIS feature ID: 2807139

Underhill Center is an unincorporated village and census-designated place (CDP) in the town of Underhill, Chittenden County, Vermont, United States. As of the 2020 census, Underhill Center had a population of 142.

The community is 4.9 miles (7.9 km) east of the village of Jericho. Underhill Center has a post office with ZIP code 05490, which opened on December 30, 1850.
