= Underhill, Vermont =

Town in Vermont, United States

- Town
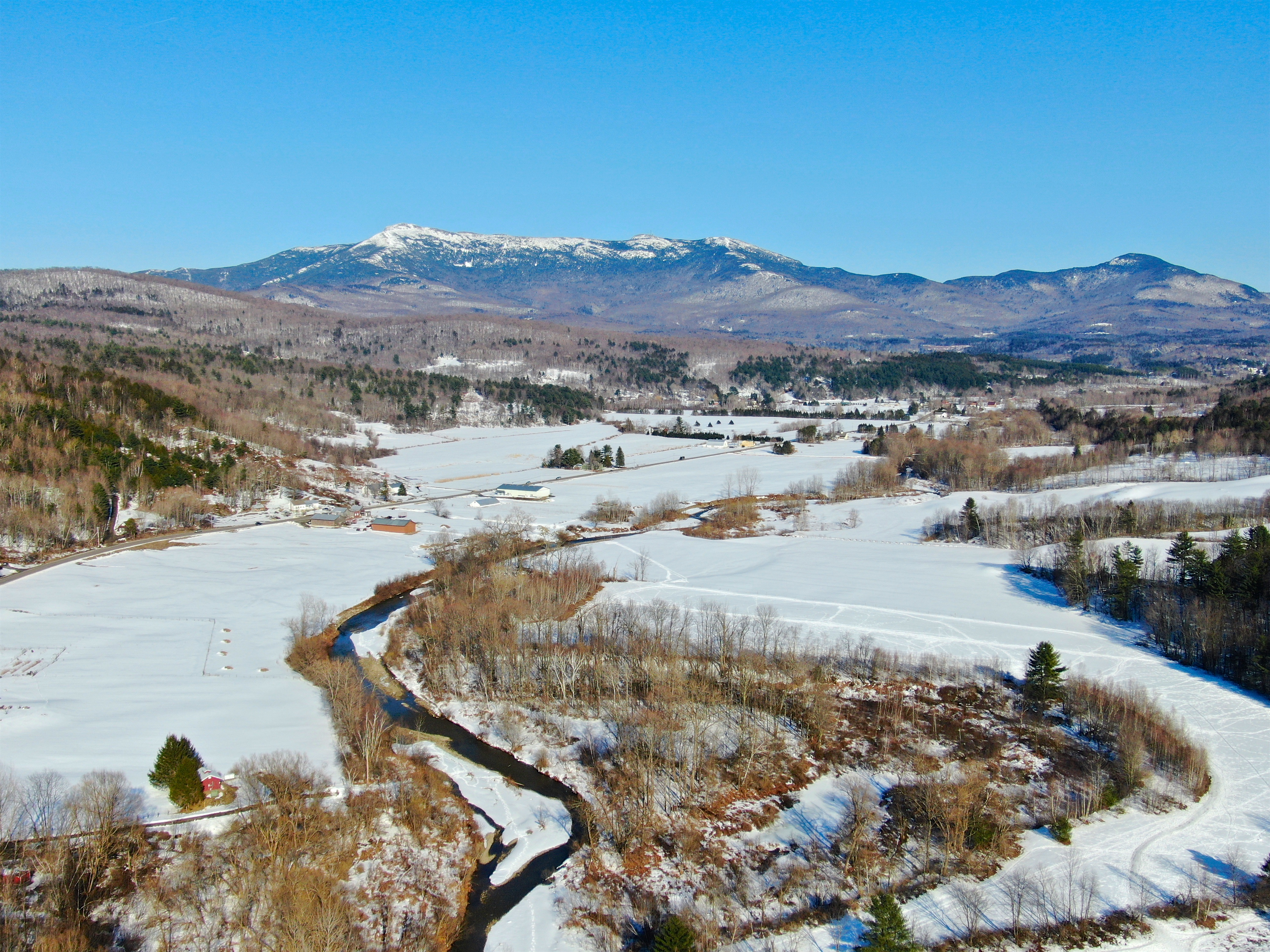
- Aerial view of Underhill & Mt Mansfield, over the Browns River looking east towards Underhill Center (upper right)

- Seal

- Location in Chittenden County and the state of Vermont.
- Coordinates: 44°32′09″N 72°53′10″W
- Country: United States
- State: Vermont
- County: Chittenden
- Communities: Underhill Center; Underhill Flats (part); North Underhill; Stevensville

Area
  - Total: 51.4 sq mi (133.1 km^{2})
  - Land: 51.4 sq mi (133.0 km^{2})
  - Water: 0.039 sq mi (0.1 km^{2})
- Elevation: 1,050 ft (320 m)

Population (2020)
  - Total: 3,129
  - Density: 61/sq mi (23.5/km^{2})
- Time zone: UTC−5 (Eastern (EST))
  - Summer (DST): UTC−4 (EDT)
- ZIP Code: 05489–05490
- Area code: 802
- FIPS code: 50-73975
- GNIS feature ID: 1462232
- Website: https://www.underhillvt.gov/

Underhill is a town in Chittenden County in the U.S. state of Vermont. The population was 3,129 at the 2020 census.

The town of Underhill shares a fire department with Jericho, the Underhill-Jericho Fire Department.

== Geography ==
According to the United States Census Bureau, the town has a total area of 51.4 mi^{2} (133.1 km^{2}), of which 51.3 mi^{2} (133.0 km^{2}) is land and 0.1 mi^{2} (0.1 km^{2}) (0.10%) is water.

Underhill is home to the highest summit within the state, Mount Mansfield, which has a peak elevation of 4,393 feet (1,339 m) above sea level.

The Browns River is the primary waterway within the town and originates as a stream from Mount Mansfield. It runs southwest and converges in the valley, just east of the village of Underhill Center with two other streams that also originate from Mount Mansfield; first with Stevensville Brook, and then with Clay Brook about 0.5 miles (0.80 km) further. Harvey Brook, Cranes Brook, and Mill Brook draining from other hillsides within the town also converge with the Browns River in Underhill Center.

The town of Underhill contains two villages, Underhill Flats (shown on maps as "Underhill") and Underhill Center. Both villages have U.S. post office buildings and are enumerated with ZIP codes 05489 (Underhill or Underhill Flats) and 05490 (Underhill Center).

Underhill Flats is located on the western side of the town along the Vermont Route 15 corridor, and is a shared jurisdiction with the adjacent town of Jericho. This area is otherwise known as the Underhill Incorporated District (i.e. Underhill ID) and includes the Riverside settlement in Jericho as well as the Flats settlement in Underhill. The Incorporated District was a unique authorization created by the Vermont legislature. It was listed as a designated historic Village Center; the Riverside Village Center by the former Department of Housing and Community Affairs (now known as the Agency of Commerce and Community Development) in 2010. The United Church of Underhill Presbyterian Church, and the Underhill-Jericho main fire station are located on the Underhill side of the district. The majority of the district's geographic area lies within the Town of Jericho.

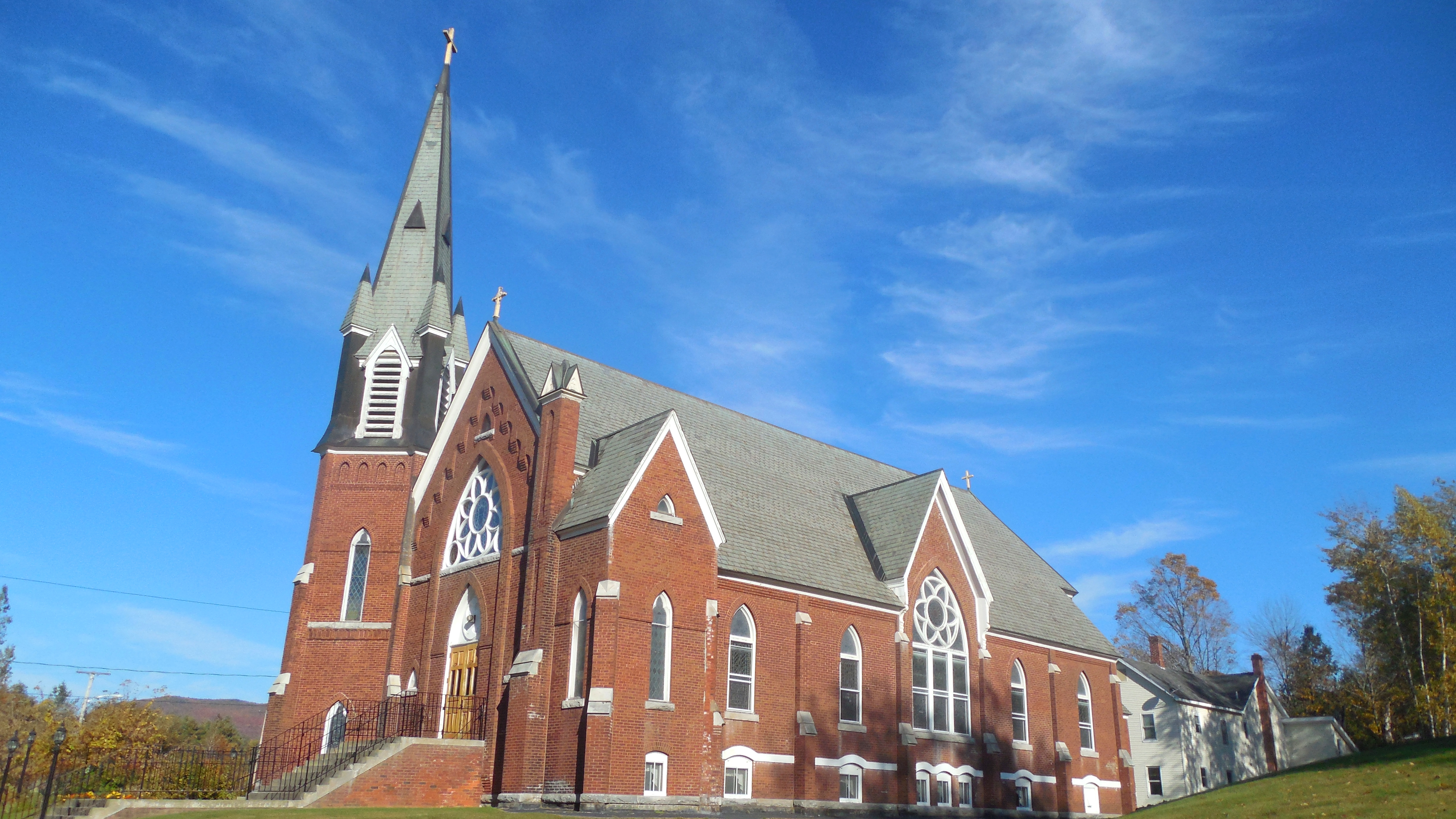
St. Thomas Church in Underhill Center

Underhill Center is an unincorporated village (i.e. not a legally defined entity) located around the intersection of River Road and Pleasant Valley Road, on the eastern side of the town closer to the foot of Mount Mansfield. Located within the village area are the Town Hall and municipal offices, the town hall park, a recreation area (with tennis courts, half-court for basketball, and a small swimming pond), Casey's Hill (a municipally owned sledding hill), and the St. Thomas Catholic Church.

== Demographics ==
Historical population
Census	Pop.	Note	%±
1790	65		—
1800	212		226.2%
1810	490		131.1%
1820	633		29.2%
1830	1,052		66.2%
1840	1,441		37.0%
1850	1,599		11.0%
1860	1,637		2.4%
1870	1,655		1.1%
1880	1,439		−13.1%
1890	1,301		−9.6%
1900	1,140		−12.4%
1910	1,004		−11.9%
1920	896		−10.8%
1930	781		−12.8%
1940	760		−2.7%
1950	698		−8.2%
1960	730		4.6%
1970	1,198		64.1%
1980	2,172		81.3%
1990	2,799		28.9%
2000	2,980		6.5%
2010	3,016		1.2%
2020	3,129		3.7%
U.S. Decennial Census

As of the census of 2020, there were 3,129 people and 1,285 households residing in the town. The population density was 60.9 people per square mile (23.5/km^{2}). There were 1,283 housing units at an average density of 25.0 per square mile (9.6/km^{2}). The racial makeup of the town was 98.05% White, 0.44% African American, 0.13% Native American, 0.75% Asian, 0.64% from other races, and 0.60% from two or more races. Hispanic or Latino of any race were 0.70% of the population.

There were 1,285 households, out of which 65.1% had married couples living together, 13.8% had a male householder with no spouse present, and 15.% had a female householder with no spouse present. Of all households, 12.5% were made up of individuals, and 2.0% had someone living alone who was 65 years of age or older. The average household size was 2.45 and the average family size was 2.89.

In the town, the age distribution of the population shows 24.3% under the age of 18, 22.2% from 19 to 34, 38.7% from 35 to 64, and 20.4% who were 65 years of age or older. The median age was 45.7 years. For every 100 females, there were 91.7 males. For every 100 females age 18 and over, there were 100.0 males.

The median household income was $87,227, the median income for a family was $92,484, and the median income for a non-family household was $55,357. The per capita income for the town was $45,021. About 2.8% of families and 8.7% of the population were below the poverty line, including 13.0% of those under age 18 and 3.4% of those age 65 or over.

== Education ==
It is in the Mount Mansfield Modified Union School District (MMMUSD, predecessors formerly grouped in the Chittenden East Supervisory Union). Underhill Independent Elementary school tested best in the county in reading proficiency in the New England Common Assessment Program test in 2008. Underhill Central stood first in math proficiency.

On November 4, 2014, the communities of Bolton, Jericho, Richmond, Underhill ID and Underhill Town voted to form the MMMUSD. This new school district serves and governs the current town school districts of Bolton (Smilie Memorial School), Jericho (Jericho Elementary), Richmond (Richmond Elementary), Underhill ID School District (Underhill ID Elementary), Underhill Town (Underhill Central School) and Mt Mansfield Union School District (Browns River Middle, Camels Hump Middle and Mt. Mansfield Union High Schools) in grades Pre-K through 12 and Huntington students grades 5–12.

== Notable people ==
- Paul André Albert, scientist and pioneering metallurgist with IBM
- Vernon A. Bullard, United States Attorney for the District of Vermont
- Thomas Cale, non-voting congressman from the District of Alaska
- Pat Dealy, catcher with four teams
- Udney Hay, Deputy Quartermaster General of the Northern Department during the American Revolution
- Bernard Joseph Leddy, US federal judge
- Richard Phillips, captain of the Maersk Alabama in 2009 when it was hijacked by Somali pirates
