= Browns River (Vermont) =

River in Vermont, United States

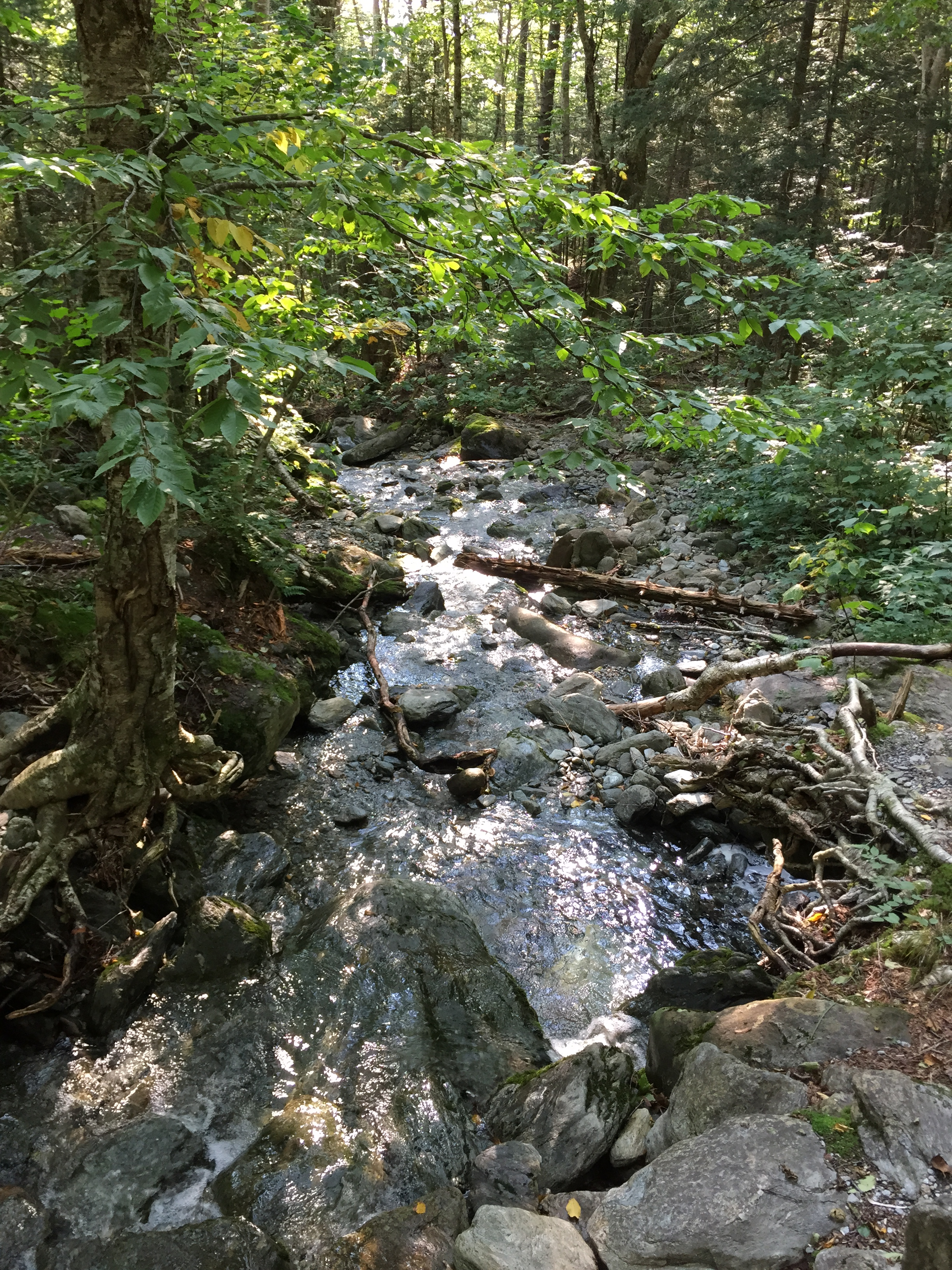
The source of Browns River, along the Sunset Ridge Trail in Mount Mansfield State Forest

The Browns River is an approximately 20-mile (32 km) waterway in northern Vermont. It is a tributary of the Lamoille River.

The mouth of the river is in Fairfax (at 44°39′36″N 73°01′08″W). The source of the river is on the western slopes of Mount Mansfield in Underhill (at 44°32′03″N 72°49′54″W).

The river flows west from Mount Mansfield, through Underhill State Park to the town of Jericho. Continuing west, it enters the town of Essex and turns north near the village of Essex Center. It passes through the town of Westford and reaches its mouth in the southwestern corner of the town of Fairfax, where it empties into the Lamoille River.

== See also ==
- List of rivers in Vermont
