= Jericho (village), Vermont =

Jericho, Vermont
- Village
- Location in Chittenden County and the state of Vermont
- Coordinates: 44°30′07″N 72°59′48″W
- Country: United States
- State: Vermont
- County: Chittenden
- Town: Jericho

Area
  - Total: 1.41 sq mi (3.64 km^{2})
  - Land: 1.40 sq mi (3.62 km^{2})
  - Water: 0.0077 sq mi (0.02 km^{2})
- Elevation: 620 ft (190 m)

Population (2020)
  - Total: 1,333
  - Density: 954/sq mi (368/km^{2})
- Time zone: UTC-5 (Eastern (EST))
  - Summer (DST): UTC-4 (EDT)
- ZIP code: 05465
- Area code: 802
- FIPS code: 50-36625
- GNIS feature ID: 2378310

Jericho is a village in Chittenden County, Vermont, United States. The population was 1,333 at the 2020 census.

== Geography ==
Jericho village is located in the northwest part of the town of Jericho, along Vermont Route 15 in the valley of the Browns River. It is 13 miles (21 km) east of Burlington. According to the United States Census Bureau, the village has a total area of 1.4 square miles (3.6 km^{2}), of which 0.01 square miles (0.02 km^{2}), or 0.47%, is water.

== Demographics ==
As of the census of 2000, there were 1,457 people, 510 households, and 412 families residing in the village. The population density was 1,013.5 people per square mile (390.7/km^{2}). There were 513 housing units at an average density of 356.8/sq mi (137.5/km^{2}). The racial makeup of the village was 96.84% White, 0.82% Black or African American, 0.34% Native American, 0.48% Asian, 0.27% Pacific Islander, 0.34% from other races, and 0.89% from two or more races. Hispanic or Latino of any race were 0.62% of the population.

There were 510 households, out of which 48.0% had children under the age of 18 living with them, 66.9% were married couples living together, 12.0% had a female householder with no husband present, and 19.2% were non-families. 13.7% of all households were made up of individuals, and 3.5% had someone living alone who was 65 years of age or older. The average household size was 2.86 and the average family size was 3.18.

In the village, the population was spread out, with 32.3% under the age of 18, 5.1% from 18 to 24, 30.7% from 25 to 44, 25.3% from 45 to 64, and 6.5% who were 65 years of age or older. The median age was 36 years. For every 100 females, there were 102.6 males. For every 100 females age 18 and over, there were 90.7 males.

The median income for a household in the village was $62,188, and the median income for a family was $70,673. Males had a median income of $43,500 versus $30,833 for females. The per capita income for the village was $24,692. About 3.1% of families and 3.0% of the population were below the poverty line, including 3.3% of those under age 18 and none of those age 65 or over.

== Old Red Mill ==
Jericho Village is well known for its famous historic landmark, Old Red Mill, on Route 15 at the entrance to Jericho Corners village. Today, the mill is headquarters of the Jericho Historical Society, and is open to the public.
