= Red Rocks Park (South Burlington, Vermont) =

Park in South Burlington, Vermont, United States

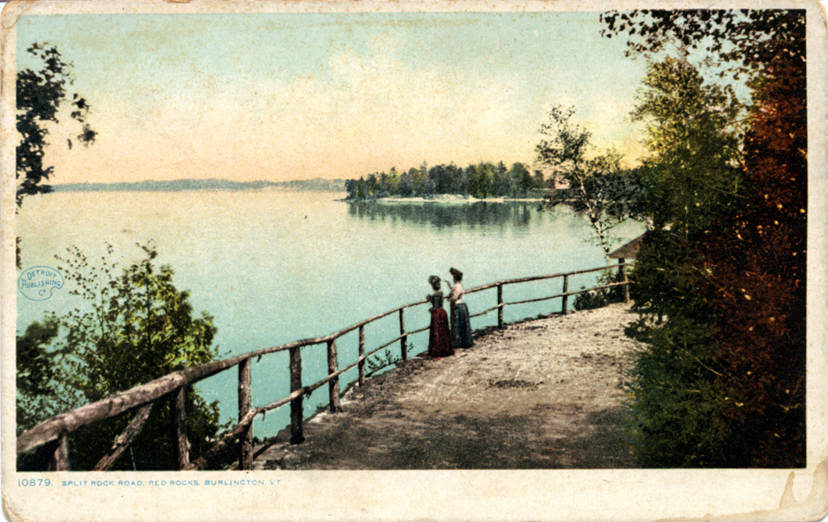
- Historic photo of "Split Rock Road" in Red Rocks Park in South Burlington looking westward.
- Interactive map of Red Rocks Park
- Location: Central Avenue in South Burlington, Vermont
- Coordinates: 44°26′42″N 73°13′12″W
- Area: 100 acres (40 ha)
- Created: 1970
- Operator: City of South Burlington Recreation & Parks Department
- Website: Red Rocks Park

Red Rocks Park is a 100-acre park (40 ha) located in South Burlington, Vermont featuring a natural area, scenic viewsheds, walking trails that may also be used for snow shoeing or cross country skiing, picnic areas, a pavilion, and access to a municipal beach and swimming area.

== Park history ==
Purchased for a private estate in 1866 by Edward Hatch, Jr., a summer seasonal resident of Burlington who managed the Lord & Taylor department store chain, the property began its recreational use in 1888 for what was to become his annual family summer retreat. In 1970, the City of South Burlington purchased the property from the Hatch family with federal assistance from the Land and Water Conservation Fund.

The Hatch family constructed carriage roads and scenic overlooks which have since become pedestrian trails that traverse the forest areas and along the fenced-off cliffage.

== Park Features ==
Red Rocks municipal beach traverses about 600 ft (180 m) of waterfront along the southern terminus of the park at Shelburne Bay in Lake Champlain. The water pumping station located at the western terminus of the beach was constructed in 1972 and is operated by the Champlain Water District. The station draws source water from an intake line extending about 0.5 miles (0.80 km) into the Lake.

The park hosts a locally renown “Wolf Tree” that is estimated to date back to at least the 18th century.
