= Kerstin Anderson =

American stage actress and singer

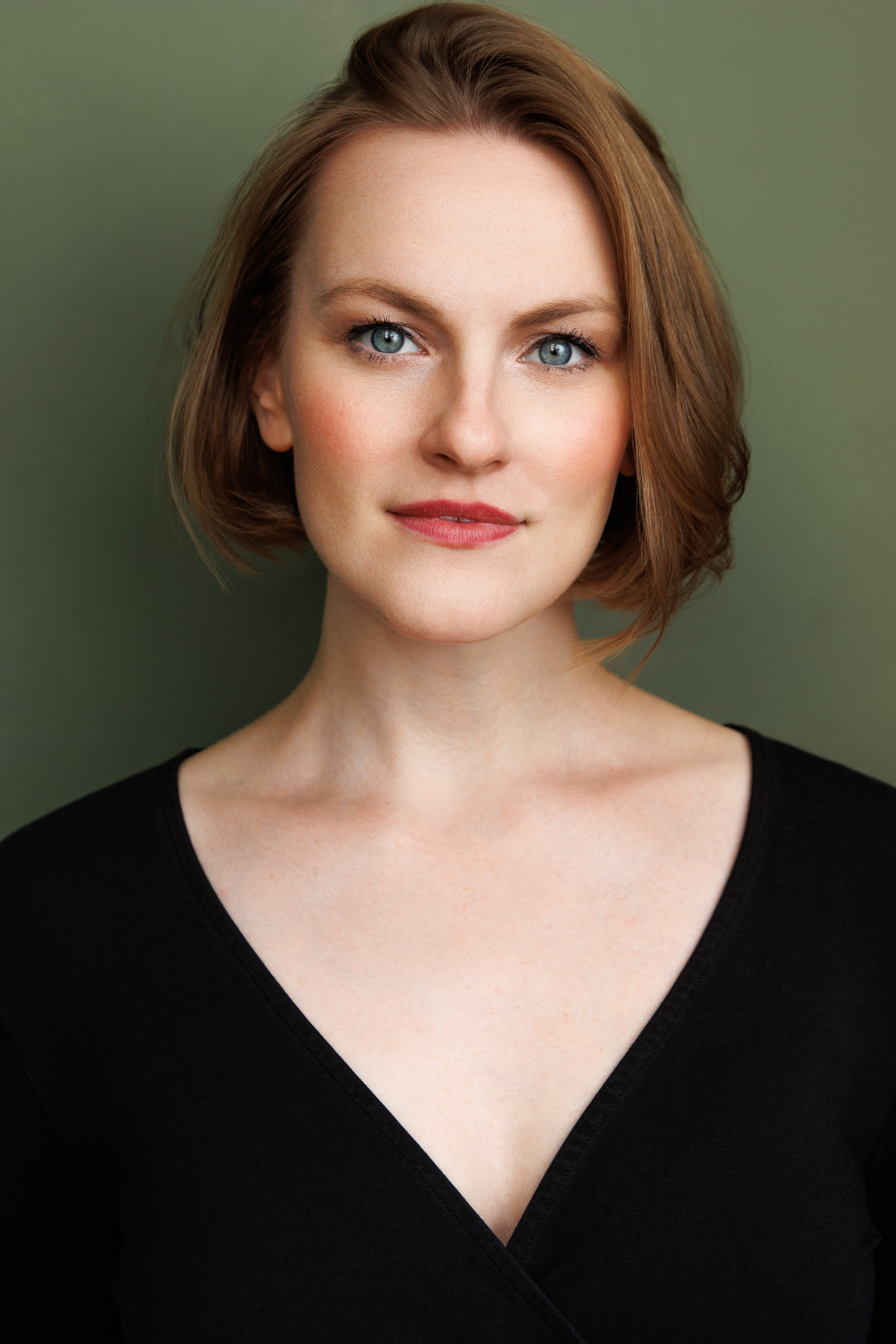
- Anderson in 2024
- Born: Kerstin Bridget Anderson; September 10, 1994 (age 32); South Burlington, Vermont, U.S.
- Education: Pace University
- Years active: 2015–present

Kerstin Bridget Anderson (born September 10, 1994) is an American stage actress and singer. She starred as Maria Von Trapp in the 2015–2017 U.S. national tour of The Sound of Music, for which she received critical praise. She made her Broadway debut as the alternate for Eliza Doolittle in the 2018–2019 revival of My Fair Lady. Since then, she has performed mostly in U.S. regional theatre.

== Early life and education ==
Anderson was raised in South Burlington, Vermont, the daughter of Frederick G. "Ted" Anderson, a scientist with IBM, and Kathleen "Kathy" Kilcoyne, a college athletic director. She grew up singing, and while attending South Burlington High School, in 2010, she played the title role in Peter Pan with the nearby Lyric Theatre Company. In high school productions, she played Asaka in Once on This Island (2011) and Elle Woods in Legally Blonde (2012). While still in high school, she directed You're a Good Man, Charlie Brown (2011), the first musical produced by a new community theatre company, Spotted Pup Productions. She then played Heidi in their production of [title of show] (2012). She also competed on the high school's dance team, which won the state championship her junior year.

After graduating from high school in 2013, Anderson attended Pace University. There, she starred as Clara in The Light in the Piazza, directed by Victoria Clark, and as Annie in The Visit. In 2014, Anderson played Shy in the Forestburgh Playhouse production of The Best Little Whorehouse in Texas. She interrupted her education after her second year to play Maria Von Trapp in the 2015–2017 U.S. national tour of The Sound of Music.

== Career ==
The national tour of The Sound of Music began in September 2015. Reviews of Anderson's performances as Maria were strongly positive. Jordan Riefe of The Hollywood Reporter wrote, "Her crisp, clear soprano voice isn’t the strongest in the cast, but Anderson makes a fine fit for the tricky role." Margaret Gray of the Los Angeles Times commented, "Anderson takes charge with a spirit so joyful, a physicality so lithe and coltish, and a soprano so flawlessly soaring, that only Frau Schraeder ... could possibly resist her charm." Tim Smith of The Baltimore Sun agreed: "She shines right from her first scene.... She is ... persuasive an actor, effortlessly connecting with the children and making Maria's spiritual struggle register. She is especially adept at conveying Maria's gradual falling in love with von Trapp". In Variety, Bob Verini commented that Anderson has a "natural glow (though she ... seems to have no control over her hands)". The tour ended in July 2017. For the role, she was nominated in 2017 for the IRNE Award: Large Theater: Best Visiting Actress.

Anderson made her Broadway debut as Eliza in the 2018 Broadway revival of My Fair Lady. Originally an understudy for the role, she became the alternate for the role, playing Saturday matinée performances beginning on July 8, 2018, switching to Tuesday nights in October 2018 and continuing until the production closed in July 2019.

She repeated the role of Maria for Northern Stage in Vermont from November 2019 to January 2020, followed by Lucy Lemay in the musical Unknown Soldier, composed by Michael Friedman, at Playwrights Horizons in New York in February and March 2020 and again at Arena Stage in Washington, D.C. from March to May 2024; Sister James in Doubt: A Parable at Westport Country Playhouse in Connecticut in November 2021; Simone in the musical Afterwords, by Zoe Sarnak (music and lyrics) and Emily Kaczmarek (book), at 5th Avenue Theatre, Seattle, Washington, in April and May 2022; Diana Dahl Bennett in Cult of Love at Berkeley Repertory Theatre, California, from January to March 2024; Anne Egerman in A Little Night Music in concert production at Lincoln Center's David Geffen Hall in June 2024; Jenna in Waitress at 5th Avenue Theatre, Washington, and at Theatre Under the Stars in Houston, Texas, in March 2025; and Natalie Haller in All Shook Up at Goodspeed Musicals, Connecticut, from June to August 2025. She also appears on the cast recording of Unknown Soldier; a review in Musical Theatre Review stated: "The cast is excellent and includes: Kerstin Anderson".

Of Anderson's performance as Jenna in Waitress, Natalie de la Garza of Houston Press complimented both her acting and singing, writing: "Anderson beautifully ... turns in the most grounded and the most affecting performance. [W]hen she sings, the production hits another level. ... The anticipation was high and Anderson more than delivered." Gemma Wilson of The Seattle Times agreed: "Anderson sounds sensational. ... Listening to her, Gresham and Shaw ... is a unique pleasure, one to remind you what makes musical theater a joy." D. R. Lewis of DC Theater Arts. commented that, in Unknown Soldier, "Anderson ... deftly captures [Lucy's] mounting desperation."
