= Wheeler Nature Park =

Park in South Burlington, Vermont, United States

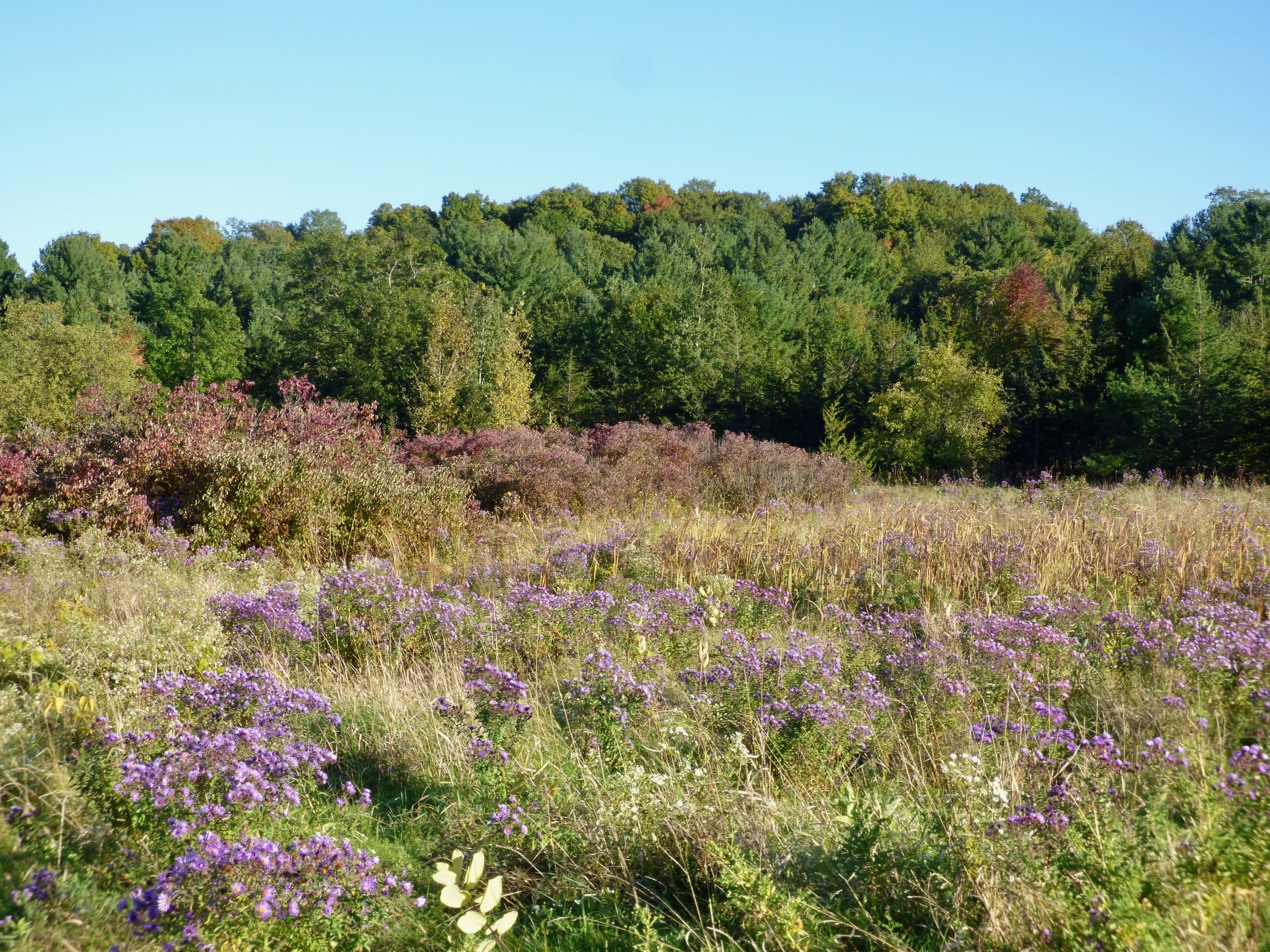
- Wheeler Nature Park in South Burlington looking eastward.
- Interactive map of Wheeler Nature Park
- Location: Intersection of Dorset Street and Swift Street in South Burlington, Vermont
- Coordinates: 44°26′36″N 73°10′35″W
- Area: 119 acres (48 ha)
- Created: 1992
- Operator: City of South Burlington Recreation & Parks Department
- Website: Wheeler Nature Park

Wheeler Nature Park is a 119-acre park (48 ha) located in South Burlington, Vermont that hosts hiking trails and a natural area, as well as a 14-acre parcel featuring the historic Wheeler/Calkins House and the Wheeler Homestead Community Garden comprising garden plots, a children's' garden, and a tree nursery. A 1.5 acre off-leash fenced-in dog area also exists on the property. Originally purchased by the municipality in 1992 for $1.25 million dollars financed via municipal bonds, the natural area of the park consists of grasslands, shrublands, wetlands, and mixed forest. The historic Wheeler/Calkins House located onsite was listed within the Vermont State Register of Historic Places on November 23, 1993 (listed as property #562).

== Wheeler Homestead ==
The Wheeler Homestead includes community gardens, a children's garden with a small pavilion, and the historic Caulkins House (historically known as the Fletcher House, constructed in 1903) which currently houses Common Roots, a community agricultural and food education non-profit.

The National Gardening Association occupied the Wheeler Homestead from 2000 to 2013, leasing the original 14 acres and the farm house from the city for $1.00 per year. The lease allowed the NGA to conduct a capital campaign to restore the farm house as office space, the establishment of decorative gardens, and for the allowance of community gardens. According to their Vice President Elizabeth Métraux, the NGA had spent over $450,000 on improvements to the city-owned property.

During the autumn of 2014, the Friends of the South Burlington Library identified their need for a new storage site and began negotiations with the City of South Burlington to lease space at the Wheeler House. In tandem with Common Roots, a non-profit organization with a social mission to provide "Health Food for Healthy Kids from Healthy Farms”, the Friends of the Library signed a one-year lease in 2015 with the City to share occupancy at the Wheeler House. In June of 2021, Friends of the Library shifted their location to the newly constructed library facility within South Burlington City Center.

== Park history ==
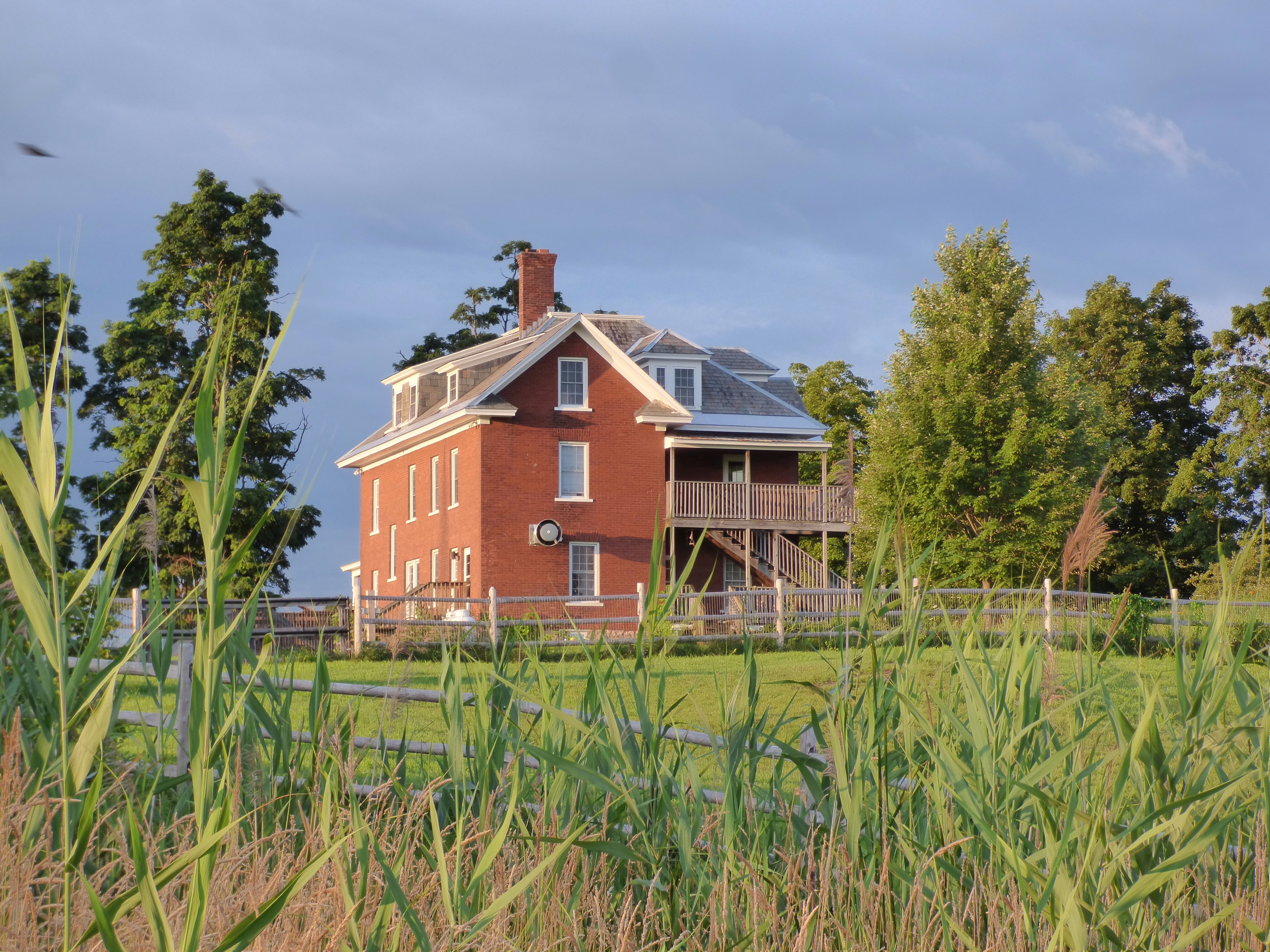
View of Fletcher-Caulkins House in 2023

According to a study conducted by the Archaeological Consulting Team, Inc. in 2003, Native American activity dating between 5,000 to 7,000 years prior had been identified in the form of projectile points found within the park. The first European-American who settled the property and constructed the original farmstead was Rufus Crossman (purchased as Lot 120), circa 1800. Over the next century the majority of the land had been cleared for agriculture where a smaller natural forest stand remained, most likely cultivated as a sugar bush for maple syrup. Aerial photos taken in 1937 indicated four structures, including a large barn existed on the northwest corner of the property. The barn burned down on the evening of October 31, 1961 when three cows perished in the blaze that appeared to have started on the second floor where most of the baled hay had been stored.

In 1859, the farm was purchased by Pierpont Edward Smith and son John Eldredge Smith. In 1878 John Smith's daughter, Alice Cornelia Smith married the park's namesake Herman H. Wheeler who constructed the three-story brick farmhouse on the property in 1903 to accommodate the couple's nine children. From that year until 1933, the building also served as the town clerk's office until Wheeler retired from the position (when the town safe was also removed from the property). In 1915, William A. Wheeler, Jr., grandson of H.H. Wheeler was born in the home and eventually became the superintendent of South Burlington's schools. By the early 20th century, the farm was known as Cedar Grove Farm..

The Wheeler family maintained ownership of the property for nearly 40 years, before it was conveyed to the Payea family in 1936. Noteworthy veteran local dairy farmer Rena E. Calkins who operated the Riverview Farm (known today as the Intervale) on the Winooski River in Burlington, her mother Ella L. Calkins, and Harley D. Dowing (of Concord, Vermont) subsequently purchased the farm (including the livestock and tools) in 1943. By the time of her retirement in 1991, Rena Calkins was the last operating dairy farmer within the City of Burlington. From 1962 to 1992, Paul Heald (a founding board member of the Vermont Natural Resources Council) leased the house from Calkins to serve as his residence and for his Foulsham Farms Real Estate business office, while Calkins continued to farm the one-hundred acres of adjacent land. As of 1993, the house remained as a rented residence.

=== Conservation and passive recreational efforts ===
In 1999, the City of South Burlington acquired the hundred acres of land abutting its original 1992 fourteen-acre purchase to be preserved as a natural area and for use as passive recreation.

On February 22, 2011, the South Burlington City Council voted to name the natural area as "Wheeler Nature Park", based on a 2010 unanimous recommendation from the South Burlington Natural Resources Committee (SBNRC) that had deliberated other historically related names, including Crossman and Calkins. "Wheeler" was considered most reflective of the property's heritage, due to Herman H. Wheeler serving as the city's Town Clerk, Treasurer, and as a representative to the Vermont Legislature, where for some time the farmhouse served as his public office.

Vermont Land Trust trail signage in Wheeler Park, 2026

On December 6, 2011, the City of South Burlington voted to exchange 7.25 acres of the Park for 21.27 acres of adjacent land (i.e. “the leg”) then called the “Wheeler Nature Park Connection Parcel”, which increased the park to approximately 119 acres. The referendum called for the City Council to commit the Wheeler Nature Park into a third-party conservation easement. The City hence revised the management plan over the next four years.

In December 2015, the city council honored the aforementioned 2011 ballot by initiating the process to commit the 119 acres into a conservation easement. Soon after, the council convened the ad hoc Wheeler Conservation Easement Task Force which held a public meeting on June 16, 2016 to begin development of what would turn out to be an eight-year long process that eventuated an agreement, where the city would continue its ownership and management of the park under the constraints of a permanent conservation easement held by the Vermont Land Trust intended to keep the park open for outdoor recreation, education, and other community uses; while protecting the park's biodiversity, wildlife habitat, water resources, forest, and fields.

In 2022, a fenced 1.5 acre dog park was constructed along the northwestern terminius park at an estimated cost of $55.000.

== Ecology ==
The roughly 35-acre (14 ha) inner forest area primarily consists of white pine, sugar maple, and hardwood trees including shagbark hickory established within dolomite, Vergennes clay (VeC), and glacial till soils that with a high pH value are ideal for their habitat. Other soil types found within the park include Covington silty clay (Cv), Farmington-Stockbridge rocky loam (FsC), less-sloped Vergennes clay (VeB), and Farmington extremely rocky loam (FaC).

Within the forest, there is a stand of over one-hundred sugar maples which are regularly tapped in the months of March and April. As it is situated on a hillside, gravity does much of the work to carry the sap to the collection buckets. The University of Vermont conducts a sustainability course that has used the sugarbush for a maple sugar production practicum.

The park's 65-acre (26 ha) open space consists of shrubland, wetlands, and streams that are tributaries of Potash Brook which flows into Lake Champlain. The early successional habitat (ESH) areas in Wheeler Park comprise the two categories of open fields and shrublands. Of the areas of young forest/shrubland cover, there is an estimated 18-acre (7.3 ha) habitat, where open fields cover an approximate 8-acre (3.2 ha) area dominated by grasses and forbs such as aster, goldenrod, and milkweed.

== Architecture of the Wheeler-Calkins House ==
When constructed in 1903, the Wheeler-Calkins House replaced a wooden farmhouse that was torn-down onsite. Some of the large hand-hewn support beams within the basement of the existing brick structure are believed to have been part of the original wooden farmhouse.

Considered to be "stylistically eclectic", the house is a combination of American Foursquare and Prairie styles as suggested by its hipped roof and broad overhanging eaves, where a Colonial Revival style is reflected in the ornamentation of the southern porch and the interior woodwork. The central front pavilion has a segmental arched gable window and cornice returns. The northern elevation has a two-tiered porch. Minimal alterations have been made to the house since its original construction where historic photographs reveal that several dormers were since added to the attic, a wooden deck originally extended along the northeast corner of the house over the stone-walled basement entrance, and the original balustrade (with finials) atop the roof deck was removed. The exterior walls are believed to be balloon-framed with a layer of back-plastering between the studs. The wall foundation is made of redstone rubble.

On the morning of October 11, 1945, the Wheeler House experienced an electrical fire that had started within a room on the first floor which subsequently spread upwards via the interior partitions within the west wall toward the attic and roof. A six-foot square hole was also burned through the first floor into the basement. Where the residence had been unoccupied for several weeks, the power had been left switched on because the barn onsite was using it via the electricity meter installed within the house. Due to a lack of sufficient water supply on the property, nine local firemen led by Assistant Fire Chief Donald H. Kelley and a group of neighbors extinguished the fire using water transported in milk cans from the nearby Myers Farm.

== Gallery ==
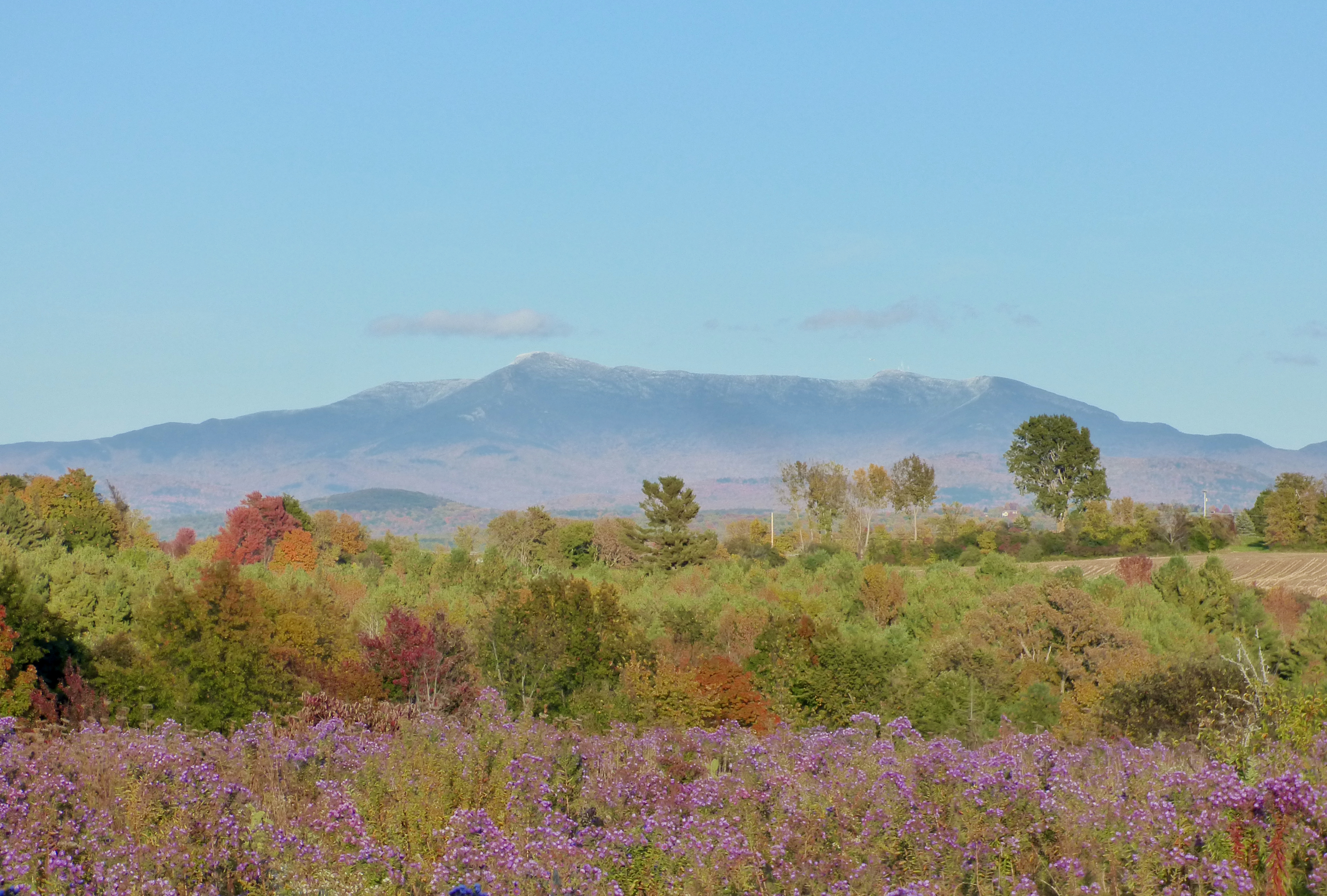
Eastward view of Mount Mansfield from field of Asters in Wheeler Nature Park.

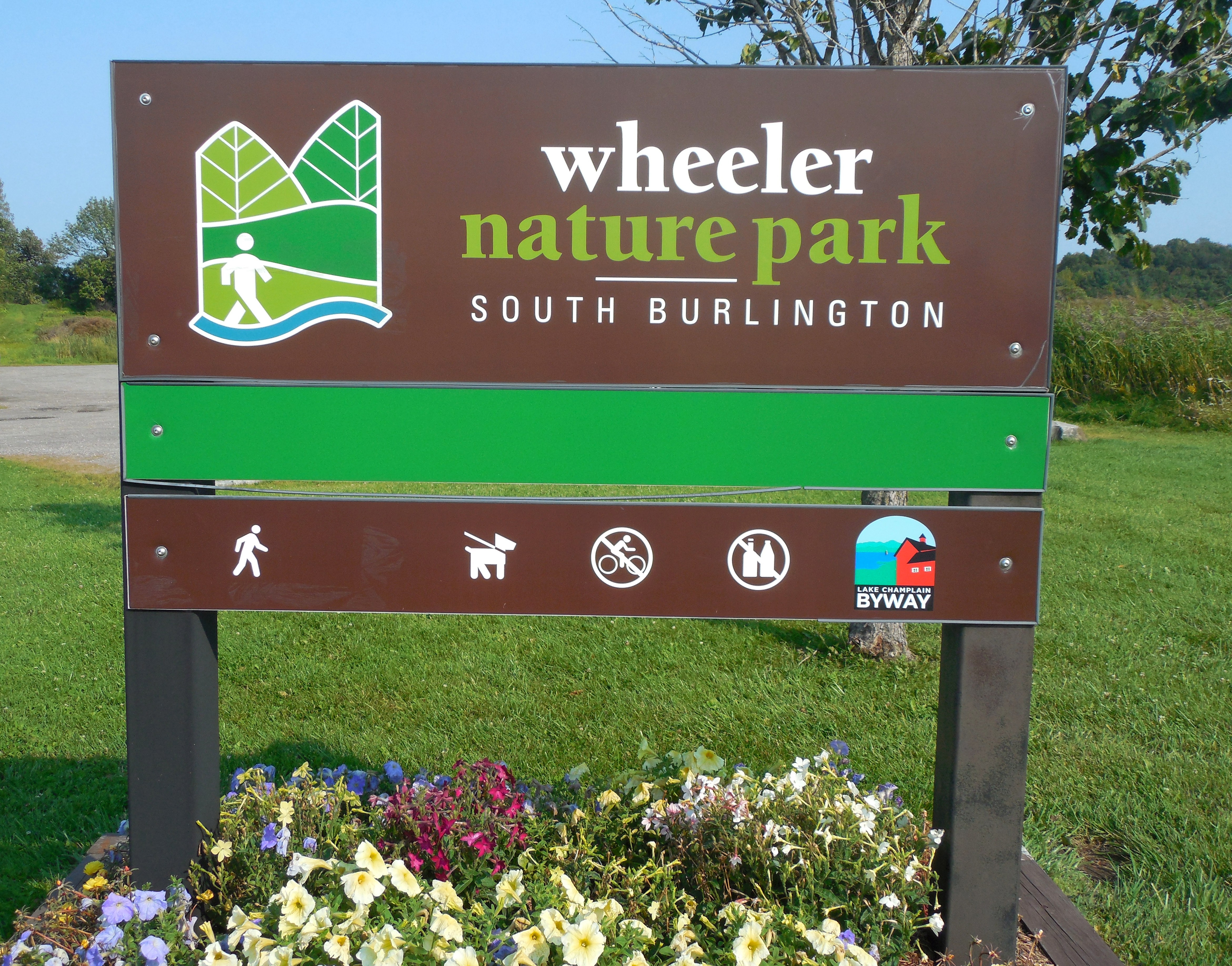
Parking area signage at Wheeler Nature Park

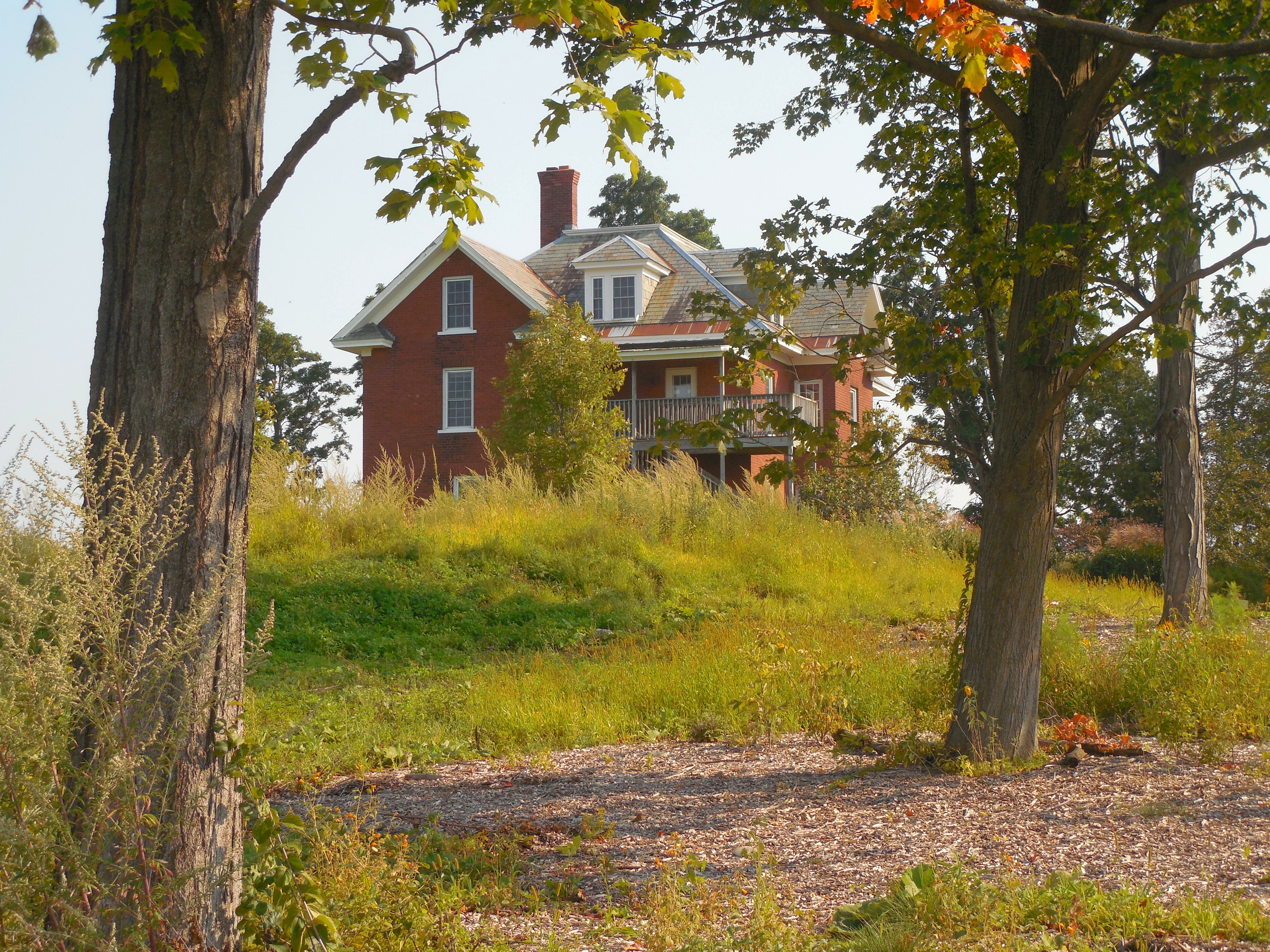
Northern view of the Fletcher-Caulkins House in 2017. Originally constructed in 1903 as the "Fletcher House".

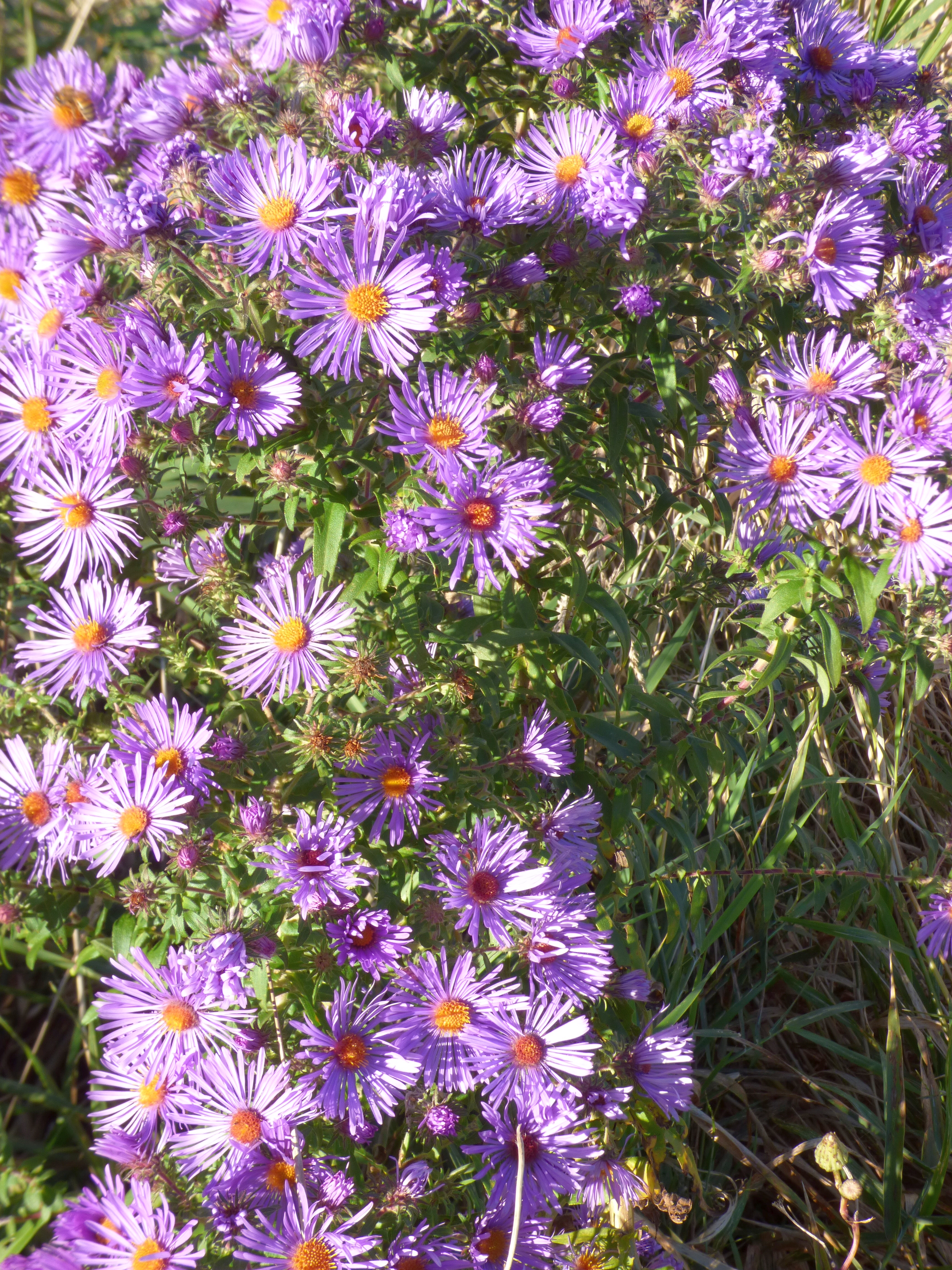
New England Asters at Wheeler Nature Park in October 2022.
