= South Burlington, Vermont =

City in Vermont, United States

- City
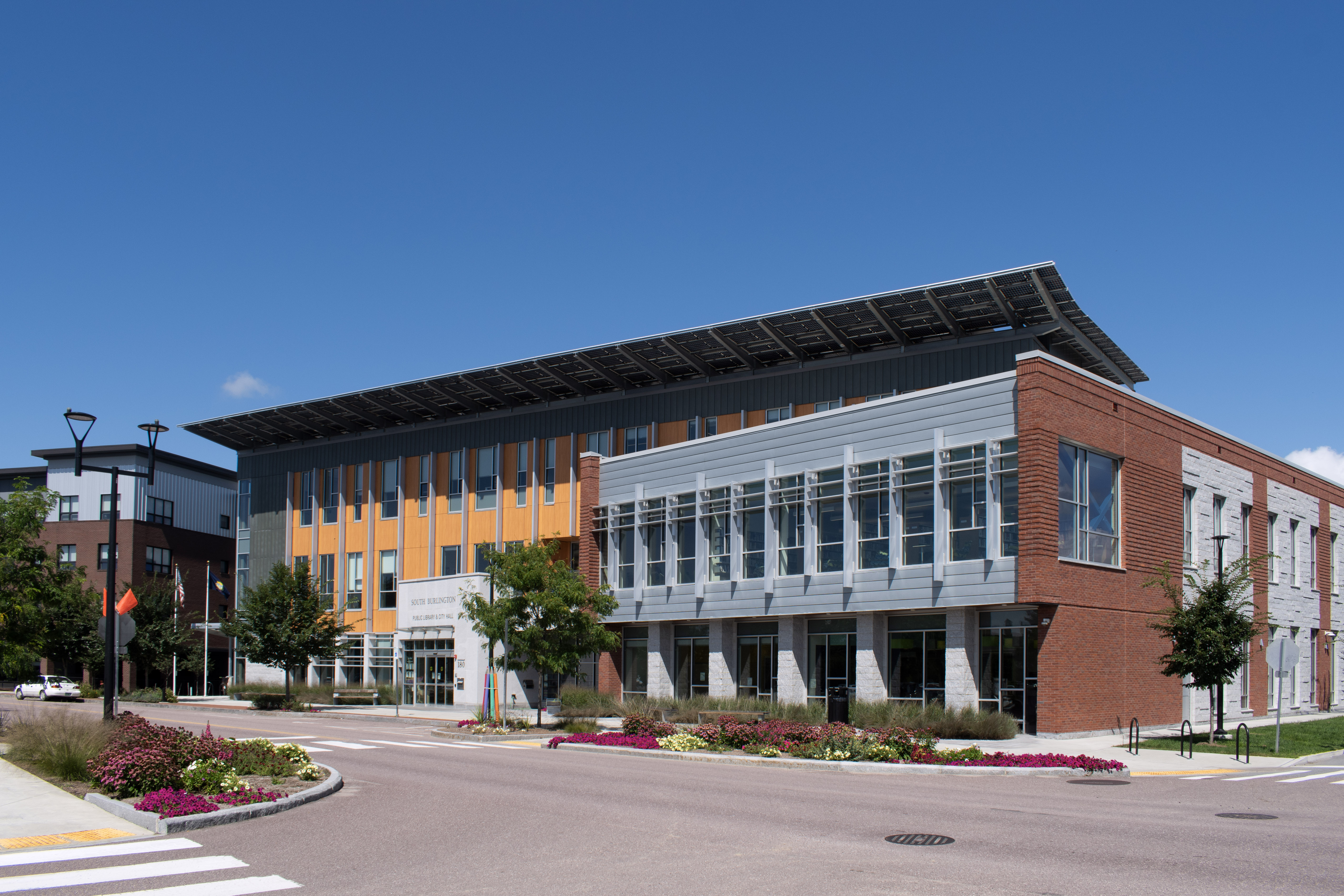
- South Burlington City Hall, Public Library, and Senior Center

- Logo

- Location within Chittenden County and Vermont
- Coordinates: 44°28′30″N 73°10′45″W
- Country: United States
- State: Vermont
- County: Chittenden
- Incorporated: 1865 (town); 1971 (city)

Area
  - Total: 29.58 sq mi (76.62 km^{2})
  - Land: 16.49 sq mi (42.71 km^{2})
  - Water: 13.09 sq mi (33.91 km^{2})
- Elevation: 95 ft (29 m)

Population (2020)
  - Total: 20,292
  - Density: 1,230.5/sq mi (475.11/km^{2})
- Time zone: UTC−5 (Eastern (EST))
  - Summer (DST): UTC−4 (EDT)
- ZIP Codes: 05403, 05407
- Area code: 802
- FIPS code: 50-66175
- GNIS ID: 1462212
- Website: southburlingtonvt.gov

South Burlington is a city in Chittenden County, Vermont, United States. Along with neighboring Burlington, it is a principal city of the Burlington metropolitan area. As of the 2020 U.S. census, the population was 20,292, making it the second-most populous city in Vermont after Burlington. It is home to the headquarters of Ben & Jerry's and the state of Vermont's largest mall, the University Mall.

== History ==
The area of South Burlington was first granted by the Province of New Hampshire as part of Burlington township on June 7, 1763.

The Town of Burlington was organized circa 1785. In 1865, the unincorporated village of Burlington was chartered as a city. The remaining area of the town of Burlington was incorporated by charter of the State of Vermont as a separate town with the name South Burlington in the same year, 1865. The Town of South Burlington was later incorporated as a city in 1971, becoming the City of South Burlington.

=== City Center ===
City Center is a new walkable downtown for South Burlington. The city is investing in infrastructure to support gathering spaces, mobility, and economic vitality. The over 300-acre area is zoned for mixed-use residential and commercial development/redevelopment interspaced with amenities. To date, the City has built a city hall, senior center and public library, streets, and a main downtown park. Two main streets, Market Street, and Garden Street form the central routes through "City Center". These streets include bicycle and walking facilities. Market Street is lined with trees and includes stormwater infiltration. Buildings housing businesses and apartments line Market Street. In addition, the 9.4 acre City Center Park has been constructed, with walking paths through a forest, a children's discovery area, and natural art landmarks.

== Geography ==
Located in western Chittenden County, South Burlington is bordered by the municipalities of Burlington to the northwest, Winooski and Colchester to the north, Essex to the northeast, Williston to the east, Shelburne to the south, and Shelburne Bay on Lake Champlain to the west. A large portion of Lake Champlain west of Burlington, extending west to the New York state line, is also part of South Burlington. The Winooski River runs along the northern edges of the city on its borders with Winooski, Colchester, and Essex.

According to the U.S. Census Bureau, the city has a total area of 29.6 square miles (76.6 km^{2}), of which 16.5 square miles (42.7 km^{2}) is land and 13.1 square miles (33.9 km^{2}), or 44.25%, is water.

== Demographics ==
Historical population
| Census | Pop. | Note | %± |
|---|---|---|---|
| 1800 | 65 | | — |
| 1810 | 68 | | 4.6% |
| 1820 | 120 | | 76.5% |
| 1830 | 135 | | 12.5% |
| 1840 | 121 | | −10.4% |
| 1850 | 127 | | 5.0% |
| 1860 | 121 | | −4.7% |
| 1870 | 791 | | 553.7% |
| 1880 | 664 | | −16.1% |
| 1890 | 845 | | 27.3% |
| 1900 | 971 | | 14.9% |
| 1910 | 927 | | −4.5% |
| 1920 | 938 | | 1.2% |
| 1930 | 1,203 | | 28.3% |
| 1940 | 1,736 | | 44.3% |
| 1950 | 3,279 | | 88.9% |
| 1960 | 6,903 | | 110.5% |
| 1970 | 10,032 | | 45.3% |
| 1980 | 10,679 | | 6.4% |
| 1990 | 12,809 | | 19.9% |
| 2000 | 15,814 | | 23.5% |
| 2010 | 17,904 | | 13.2% |
| 2020 | 20,292 | | 13.3% |
U.S. Decennial Census

South Burlington is a principal city of the Burlington, Vermont metropolitan area.

=== 2020 census ===
As of the 2020 census, South Burlington had a population of 20,292. The median age was 40.6 years, 17.8% of residents were under the age of 18, and 19.1% were 65 years of age or older. For every 100 females there were 90.2 males, and for every 100 females age 18 and over there were 87.0 males age 18 and over.

93.1% of residents lived in urban areas, while 6.9% lived in rural areas.

There were 9,108 households in South Burlington, of which 23.6% had children under the age of 18 living in them. Of all households, 41.1% were married-couple households, 18.6% were households with a male householder and no spouse or partner present, and 30.9% were households with a female householder and no spouse or partner present. About 34.5% of all households were made up of individuals and 15.1% had someone living alone who was 65 years of age or older.

There were 9,650 housing units, of which 5.6% were vacant. The homeowner vacancy rate was 0.4% and the rental vacancy rate was 6.9%.

Racial composition as of the 2020 census
| Race | Number | Percent |
|---|---|---|
| White | 16,835 | 83.0% |
| Black or African American | 639 | 3.1% |
| American Indian and Alaska Native | 25 | 0.1% |
| Asian | 1,364 | 6.7% |
| Native Hawaiian and Other Pacific Islander | 7 | 0.0% |
| Some other race | 251 | 1.2% |
| Two or more races | 1,171 | 5.8% |
| Hispanic or Latino (of any race) | 687 | 3.4% |

=== 2010 census ===
As of the census of 2010, the population density was 1,121.2 people per square mile (432.9 people/km^{2}). There were 8,429 housing units at an average density of 507.8 units per square mile (196.1 units/km^{2}).

=== 2022 estimates ===
Race and ethnicity as of the Census Population Estimates, July 1, 2022, estimates:

| White | 84.7% (83.3% non-Hispanic or Latino) |
| Black or African American | 1.4% |
| Hispanic or Latino | 2.8% |
| Asian | 8.1% |
| Pacific Islander | 0.0% |
| Two or more races | 4.8% |

=== Employment and income ===
The median income for a household in the city in 2021 dollars, 2017-2021 was $83,750.

| Employment flow in South Burlington (2019) | Count | Share |
|---|---|---|
| Total jobs in South Burlington | 20,252 | 100% |
| Employed in South Burlington, lives elsewhere | 17,639 | 87.1% |
| Employed and lives in South Burlington | 2,613 | 12.9% |

70.9% of people 16 and older in South Burlington are in the labor force. By sector, the labor force in South Burlington is concentrated in a few main sectors:

- 34.2% employed in educational services, health care, and social assistance
- 11.4% employed in manufacturing
- 9.1% employed in arts, entertainment, and recreation, and accommodation and food services
- 9.0% employed in retail
- 9.0% employed in professional, scientific, and management, and administrative and waste management services

The median household income was $73,605 in 2019 and 25.2% of families have total annual income between $100,000–$150,000. The unemployment rate in 2019 was 4.4%.

== Economy ==
South Burlington has a highly diversified economy. There are 191 businesses in retail trade, mainly concentrated around City Center near Dorset Street and Williston Road. There are 131 establishments in health care and assistance and 116 in professional, scientific, and technical service industries. In 2020, South Burlington was first in the state for gross retail and use sales with $1,385,886,972.

Some of the major employers in South Burlington are the Vermont Air National Guard, BETA Technologies, Ben & Jerry's,OnLogic Other important economic forces in South Burlington include the State's largest airport, several industrial parks, the I-89 interstate, the University Mall, Vermont's largest mall, five major grocery stores and City Center.

== Parks and recreation ==
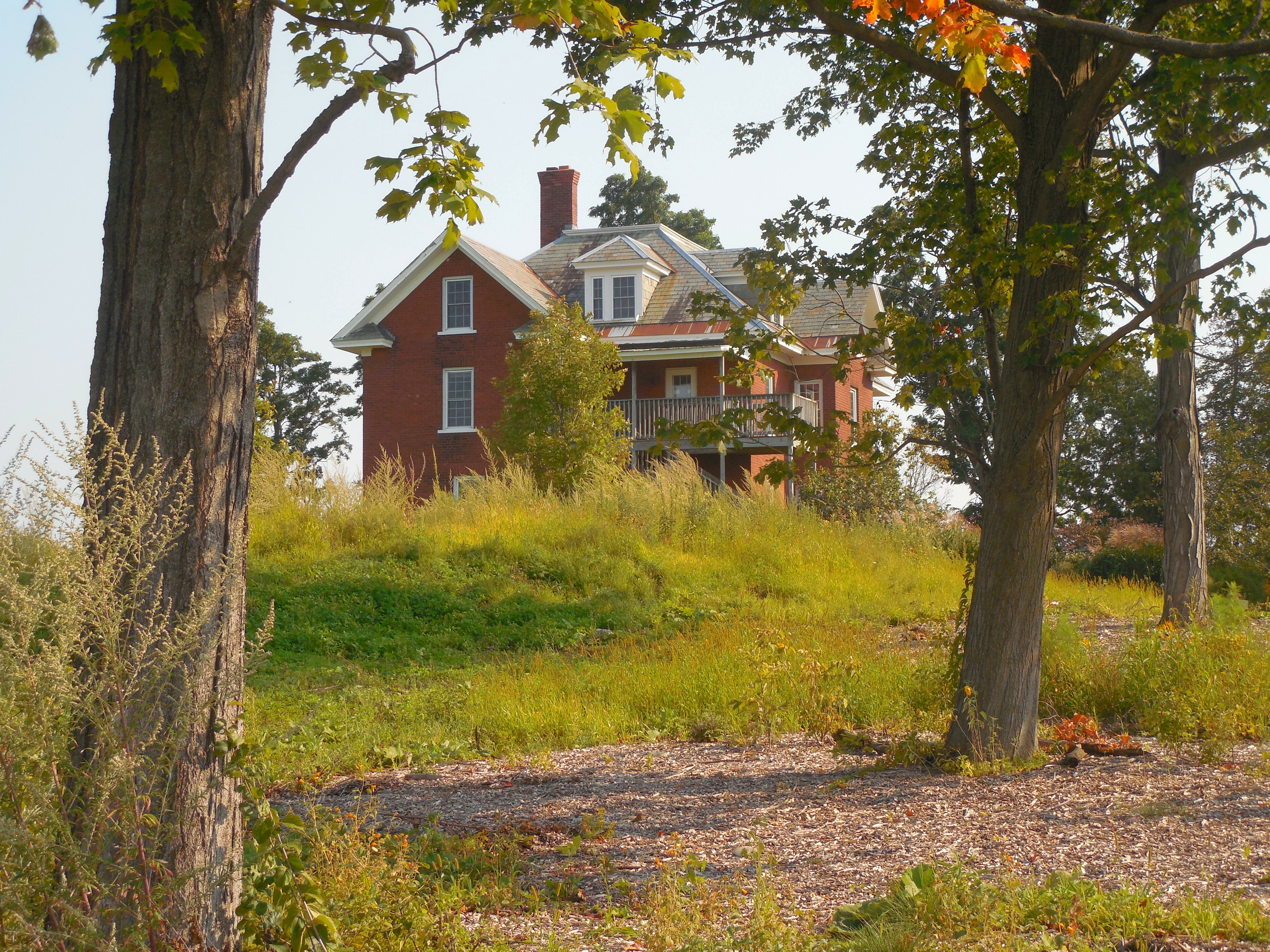
The Fletcher-Caulkins House at Wheeler Nature Park

South Burlington is home to a variety of parks that have various walking trails with various amenities for all ages. All parks have parking available.

- Red Rocks Park is a public park and beach on the shores of Lake Champlain.
- Farrell Park is a 22-acre park with a playground, picnic area, has access to pedestrian trails and an off-leash dog park.
- Overlook Park is a scenic park overlooking Lake Champlain and the Adirondacks.
- Veterans Memorial Park (also known as Dorset Park) is the city's most well-known park. It has three baseball fields, one basketball court, a playground, and Cairns Arena, the high school's hockey arena, is close by.
- Jaycee Park has a playground, basketball court, and open space for people to use.
- Szymanski Park is located in the South End of the city. It has a basketball court, tennis courts, a playground, picnic area, access to recreational and pedestrian trails.
- Wheeler Nature Park, a park located just south of Veterans Memorial Park, with one hiking trail and scenic views of Mount Mansfield.

== Government ==
The city government is a council–manager form of government with five at-large city council members. Budgets must be approved by voters. The city budget for 2021 was $26,599,754. The city maintains roads, recreation paths and parks, and recreation, planning and zoning, fire and police departments as well as a city clerk's office and city manager's office. The city clerk is elected by the voters and the city manager is appointed by the city council. The city also has a sewer (water quality), stormwater, and water utility.

== Education ==
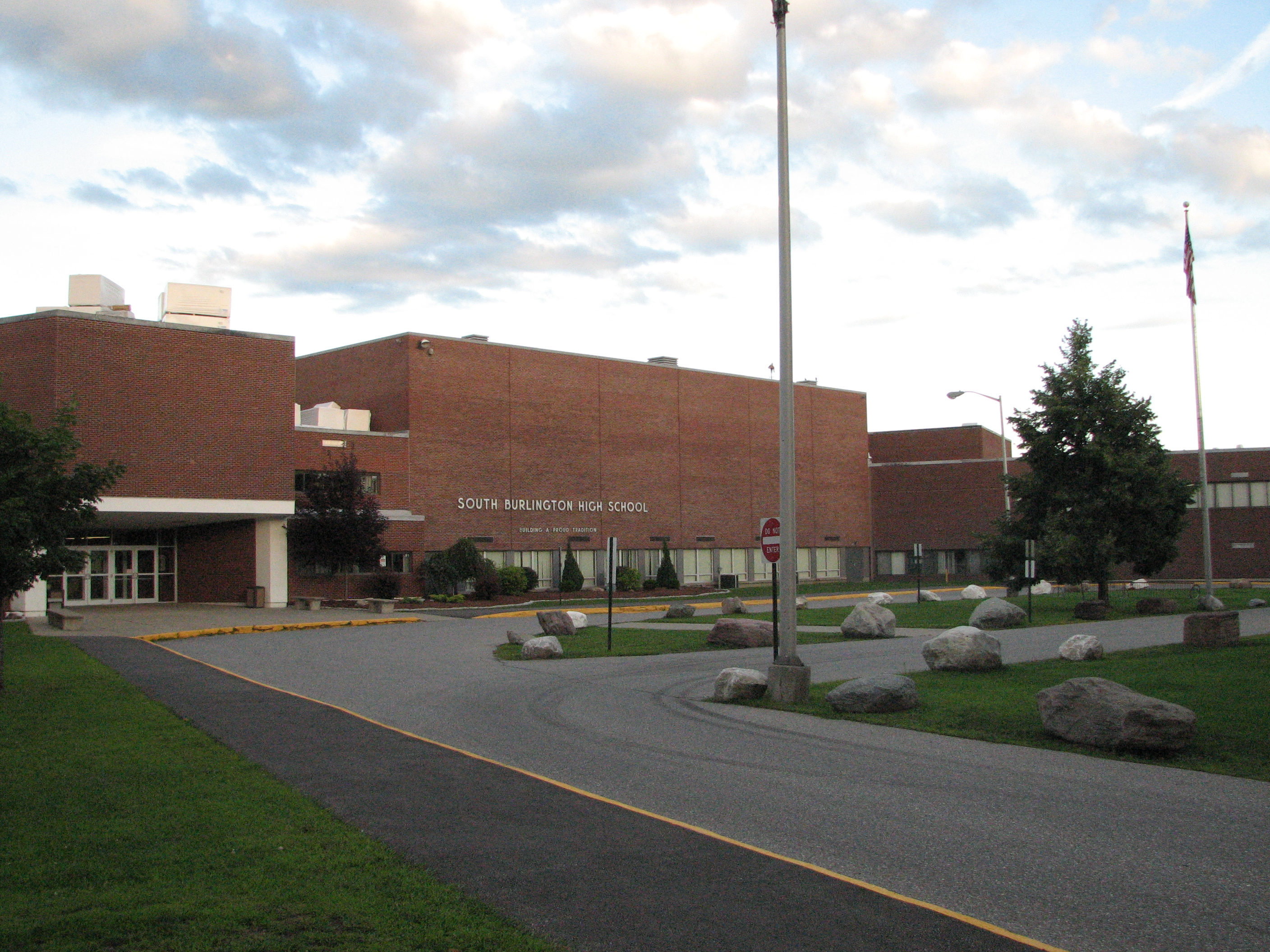
South Burlington High School

=== Elementary schools ===
- Chamberlin School (public)
- Orchard School (public)
- Rick Marcotte Central School (public)
- The Schoolhouse (private, independent)

=== Middle schools ===
- Frederick H. Tuttle Middle School (the city's only public middle school)
- Vermont Commons School (private, independent)

=== High schools ===
- Rice Memorial High School (private, Roman Catholic)
- South Burlington High School (the city's only public high school)
- Vermont Commons School (private, independent)

== Media ==
=== Newspapers ===
- The Other Paper, a weekly newspaper published since 1977. Now owned by the Vermont Community Newspaper Group.

=== Television ===
- WCAX-TV
- WPTZ – Although licensed to Plattsburgh, New York, the station relocated their main studio facility to the same building in South Burlington that contains the Ben & Jerry's headquarters in the fall of 2019.

=== Radio ===
- WXXX – 95.5 FM (95 Triple X) (Top 40)

== Infrastructure ==
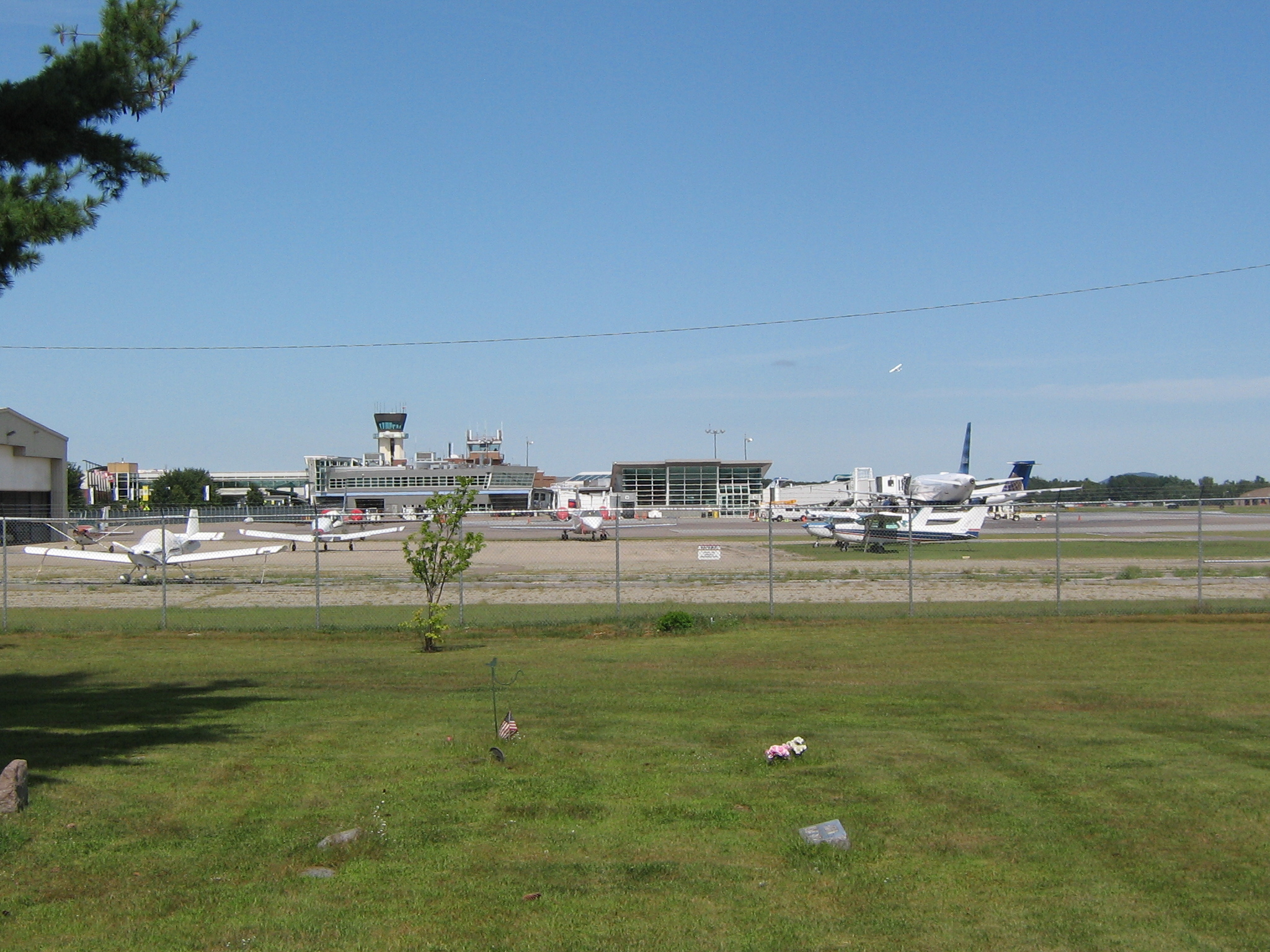
Burlington International Airport in South Burlington

=== Transportation ===
==== Airport ====
Patrick Leahy Burlington International Airport provides the area with commercial service to major regional hubs and international airports. Despite its name, it is located in South Burlington, although the land it is located on is owned and operated by the neighboring City of Burlington, Vermont's most populous municipality. It originally did not offer scheduled commercial flights to destinations outside the United States, although it now has a Customs Port of Entry. The name dates to a time when it offered flights to Montreal. From 2011 to 2018, there were seasonal flights to Billy Bishop Airport in Toronto. Bus service is provided by Green Mountain Transit.

The airport is the base of the Vermont Air National Guard and an Army Aviation Support Facility (AASF) of the Vermont Army National Guard. The airport is the muster point for the Air Wing of the Vermont State Guard.

==== Major highways ====
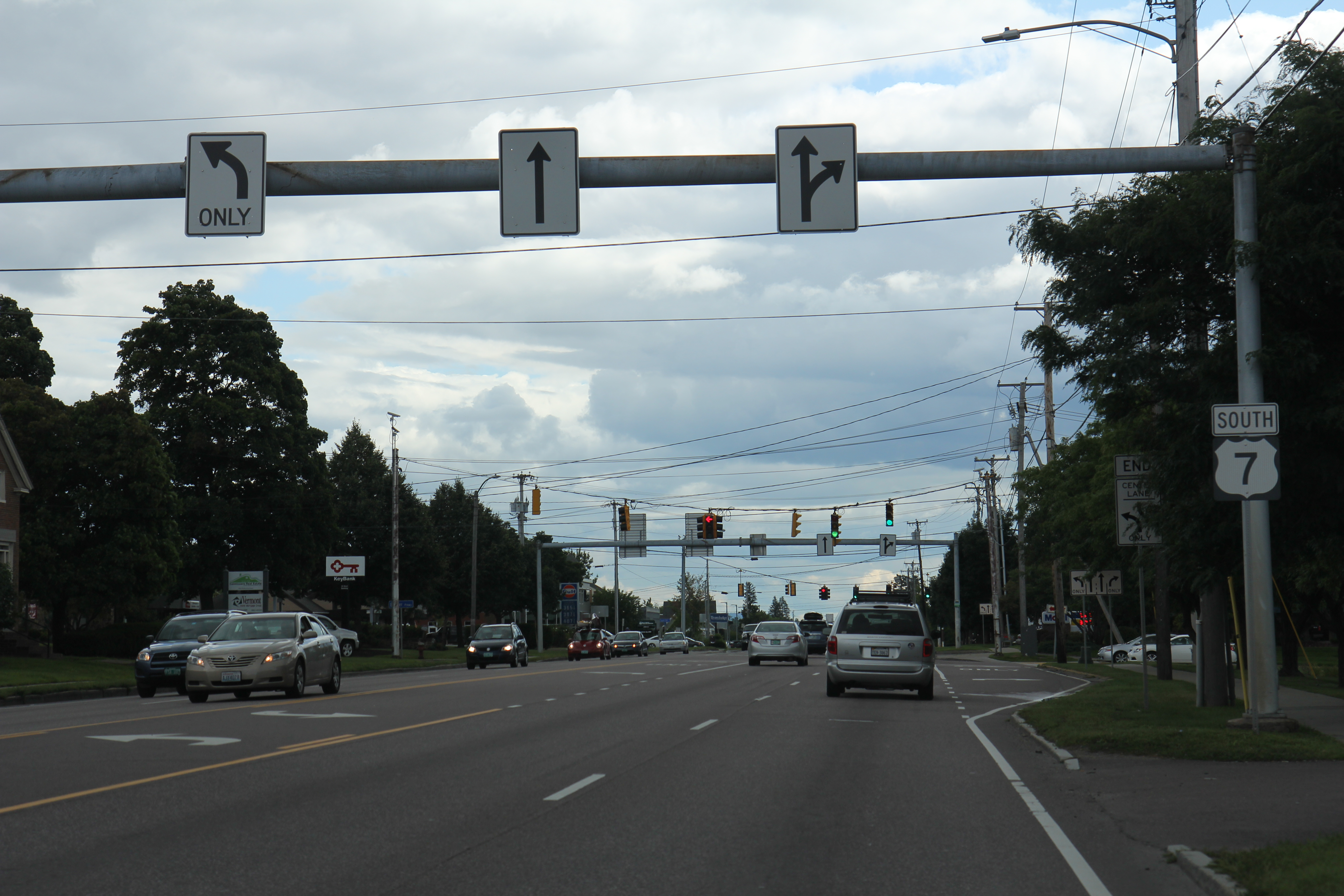
US Route 7 in South Burlington is a major corridor in Vermont.

- Interstate 89
- Interstate 189
- U.S. Route 2
- U.S. Route 7
- VT 116 (Vermont Route 116)

Interstate 89 has two interchanges serving the city. Exit 13 merges with I-189, which ends at the Champlain Parkway. The second interchange, Exit 14, is the state of Vermont's largest highway exit and merges onto U.S. Route 2. Exit 14E merges onto Williston Road and Dorset Street in South Burlington. Exit 14W is the main exit into Burlington and becomes Main Street in the Burlington city limits, by the University of Vermont.

Interstate 189 travels West to East, connecting two of the city's main commercial roads: Shelburne Road (U.S. Route 7), at its western terminus with the Champlain Parkway, and Dorset St (at an incomplete interchange with I-89) at its eastern terminus.

VT 116 (Vermont Route 116) runs north–south into South Burlington, with the northern terminus being at a junction at U.S. Route 2 (Williston Road).

== Notable people ==
- Kerstin Anderson, stage actress
- Harry Bliss, cartoonist and illustrator
- Ronald Braunstein, conductor
- Louvenia Bright, first Black woman to serve in the Vermont General Assembly
- Jim Condos, Secretary of State of Vermont and former member of the Vermont Senate and South Burlington City Council
- Jason Chin, author of award-winning book Redwoods; resides in South Burlington
- Garry Davis, world citizen, peace activist, founder of the World Service Authority and creator of the World Passport
- Erica Deuso, first openly transgender mayor in Pennsylvania
- John Dooley, former associate justice of the Vermont Supreme Court
- Jack Du Brul, New York Times bestselling author; resides in South Burlington
- Christian Hansen Jr., U.S. Marshal for Vermont and member of the Vermont House of Representatives
- Benjamin N. Hulburd, former chief justice of the Vermont Supreme Court
- Major Jackson, poet
- Jack Leggett, collegiate baseball coach
- Aaron Miller, retired NHL player and Olympic medalist (one silver and one bronze); resides in South Burlington
- Mike Rochford, pitcher with the Boston Red Sox and Yakult Swallows; was raised in South Burlington
- Barbara Snelling, former Lieutenant Governor of Vermont, member of the Vermont Senate and First Lady of Vermont
- Martin St. Louis, retired NHL player and current head coach of the Montreal Canadiens; resides in South Burlington
- Charles Tetzlaff, United States Attorney for the District of Vermont
- Devon Teuscher, principal dancer with the American Ballet Theatre
