= South Burlington High School =

Coordinates: 44.454706°N 73.177829°W

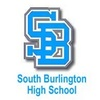

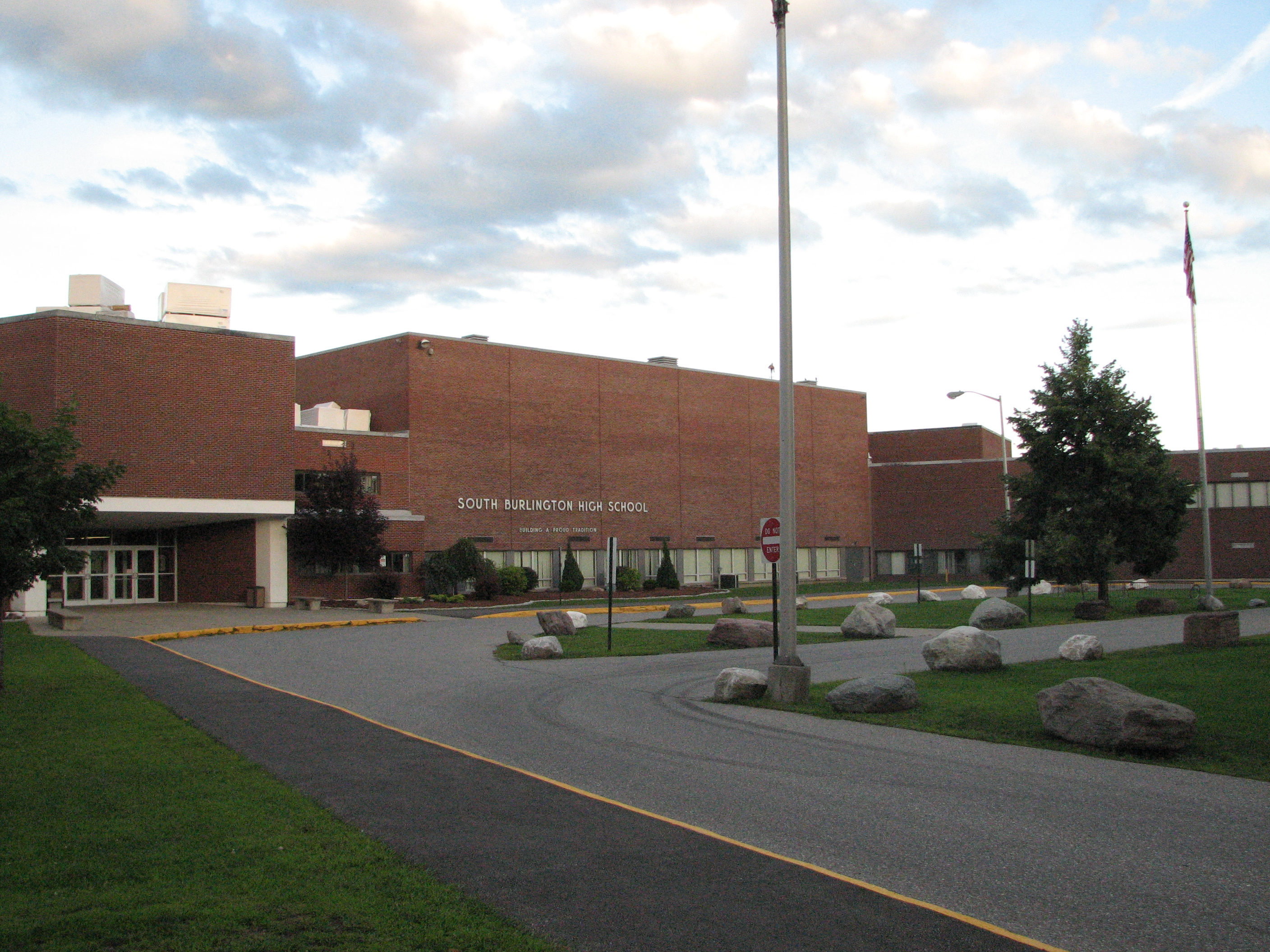

Location
- 550 Dorset Street; South Burlington, Vermont, U.S.

Information
- Type: Public secondary
- Established: 1957
- Principal: Lissa McDonald (2026-Present)
- Grades: 9 to 12
- Enrollment: 815 (2023–2024)
- Colors: Columbia Blue, Gray and White
- Athletics: 18 sports
- Athletics conference: Northern Vermont Athletic Conference (NVAC) and Vermont Principals' Association
- Nickname: SBHS
- Team name: Wolves
- Website: sbhs.sbschools.net/o/sbhs

South Burlington High School (SBHS) is a public secondary school in the suburban municipality of South Burlington, Vermont, United States. The school colors are blue and grey and the nickname is the Wolves. Enrollment in 2022 was 887.

== Academics ==
The school is accredited as a public secondary school by the New England Association of Schools and Colleges. Students can enroll concurrently in both high school and technical programs, and approximately ten percent of students do so each year at either the Burlington Technical Center or the Center for Technology, Essex. South Burlington High School also offers a personalized, experiential learning pathway, Big Picture South Burlington, which is part of the international Big Picture Learning Network, allowing students to design an individualized curriculum to meet state learning standards.

The school offers accelerated programs in Mathematics, Science, French, and Spanish; honors courses in English and Mathematics; and a selection of fourteen Advanced Placement ("AP") courses. AP courses include AP Biology, AP Calculus AB, AP Chemistry, AP Computer Science A, AP Computer Science Principles, AP Environmental Science, AP European History, AP French, AP Psychology, AP Spanish, and AP U.S. Government & Politics. Not all AP courses are taught every academic year. The school formerly taught AP Calculus BC.

A portion of the student body commutes to the campus because of its academic offerings. Some students have elected to commute from nearby areas in Vermont where there are no local secondary schools, such as all of Grand Isle County and portions of Franklin County. The school also gets commuters from other inner Chittenden County municipalities such as Burlington, Essex, Shelburne, and Williston.

The school tested best in the county in reading proficiency in the New England Common Assessment Program test in 2008. It was second best in the county in math proficiency.

Tuition was $12,816 in 2009-2010. This tuition was paid by towns outside the school district sending students to this public school.

== Student activities ==
- In 2009, the PTC (Parametric Technology) Real World Design Challenge Team placed first in the state and represented Vermont at the national championships in Washington, D.C., on March 20, 2009.
- The debate team took the state title at the Vermont State House in 2008 and 2012.
- In 2004 and 2006, the civics team represented Vermont at the national championships in Washington, D.C.
- The Scholars' Bowl team has won regional titles, including the Vermont NAQT Championship, Sue Pasco Invitational, and Medlar Cup.
- In 2014, the SBHS Real World Design Challenge Team (Next Level) represented Vermont at the national championships in Washington, D.C. The team won the competition for the first time in school and state history.
- The school has participated in Model United Nations programs at both Dartmouth College and Harvard University.

== Athletics ==
The SBHS athletic teams were formerly known as the "Rebels". Due to the historical controversies associated with the name and its disputed connection to the American Civil War, a "Captain Reb" mascot was discontinued in the early 1990s. However, the school continued with its nickname of "Rebels" until the local school board voted unanimously to retire the "Rebel" name by August 2017. A petition to put the name change to a referendum was signed by over 5% of South Burlington residents, the necessary threshold for the question to be put to a ballot, but the school board struck down the proposed referendum. The case is now being heard in the Vermont Supreme Court. The school board went ahead and approved the name change to "Wolves" on June 8, 2017 despite the pending court case. The school has a state-of-the-art stadium and running track. The ice hockey team plays off campus at nearby Dorset Park in the City of South Burlington's Cairns Arena, shared with the CVU Redhawks and Saint Michael's College Purple Knights (as home ice, along with a few other teams). SBHS's chief athletic rivals in the Division I Metro Conference are Essex High School, Champlain Valley Union High School, Burlington High School, Mount Mansfield Union High School, BFA-St. Albans and nearby private Catholic Rice Memorial High School.

Some of the school's notable former athletes include longtime Clemson Tigers baseball coach Jack Leggett, former Boston Red Sox major league relief pitcher Mike Rochford, current minor league pitcher Casey Harman and France national baseball team pitcher Owen Ozanich.

The school has won many Vermont state championships in almost every sport.

SBHS has funded clubs for sports that are unconventional in the United States such as cricket, ultimate frisbee, and rugby. Rugby players from the school have formed a combined team with students from Champlain Valley Union High School and played other teams from across the region. The cricket team has played another club team of students based in Essex, Vermont at Fort Ethan Allen.

For the 2018 Fall season, low roster numbers forced South Burlington and Burlington High School's football programs to field a co-op team. The team is called the "Seawolves", a portmanteau of the school's mascots, Burlington's Seahorses and South Burlington's Wolves.

== Drama and music ==
=== Drama ===
The drama club produces three shows annually: a musical in the fall and one-act plays in the spring.

==== List of musicals ====
- 2004 – Footloose
- 2005 – Grease
- 2006 – Anything Goes
- 2007 – Seussical The Musical
- 2008 – Into the Woods
- 2009 – Guys and Dolls
- 2010 – Beauty and the Beast
- 2011 – Once On This Island
- 2012 – Legally Blonde
- 2013 – Urinetown
- 2014 – Bring It On the Musical
- 2015 – The Boy Friend
- 2016 – Sister Act
- 2017 – The Addams Family
- 2018 – Man of La Mancha
- 2019 – Beauty and the Beast
- 2021 – Little Shop of Horrors
- 2022 – Once Upon a Mattress
- 2023 – 25th Annual Putnam County Spelling Bee
- 2024 – Mean Girls

Notable South Burlington High School drama alumni include Kerstin Anderson, who starred as Maria Von Trapp in the 2015 U.S. national tour of The Sound of Music, for which she received warm praise. She made her Broadway debut as the alternate for Eliza Doolittle in the 2018 revival of My Fair Lady.

=== Music ensembles ===
- There are five vocal ensembles: the Mixed Chorus, Concert Chorus, Men's Acapella, Women's Acapella (The Howlers), and the highest choir, the Chamber Singers.
- There are six instrumental groups: the Concert Band, Symphonic Band, Wind Ensemble, the Jazz Improvisation Ensemble ("B" band), the Jazz Ensemble ("A" band), and the World Drumming Ensemble.
