= Vermont Commons School =

Coordinates: 44.43121°N 73.20679°W

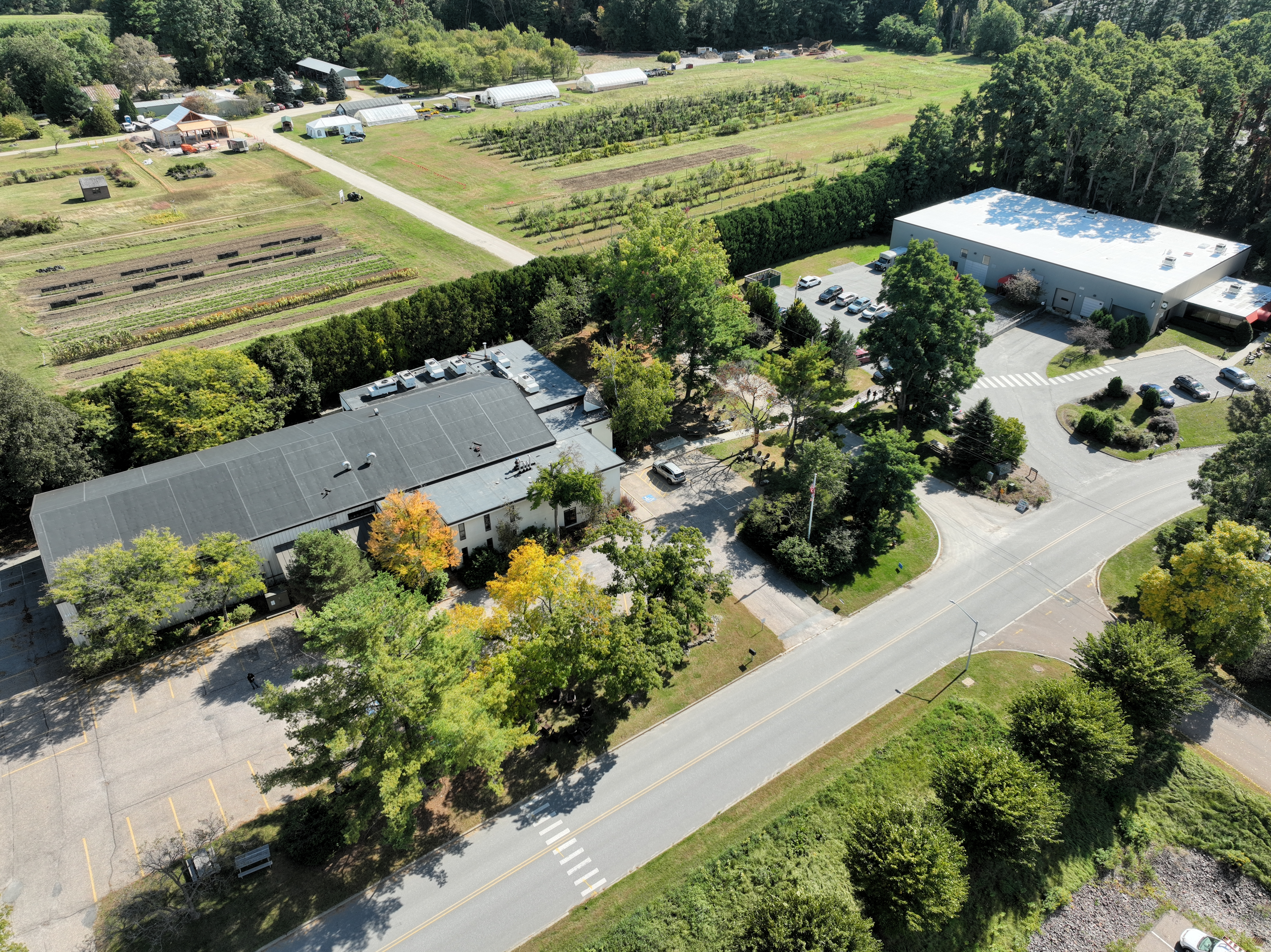
- Vermont Commons School's Main Campus

Location
- 75 Green Mountain Dr. South Burlington, Vermont; USA

Information
- Type: Private
- Motto: "Scholarship. Community. Global Responsibility."
- Established: 1997
- Founders: Dr. Robert A. Skiff; Dr. Robert A. Skiff, Jr. Leah Mital
- Sister school: Colegio Santa Ana, Pioneer Learning Community
- Chairperson: Bethany Gibbs
- Head of school: Dr. Dexter P. Mahaffey
- Faculty: 25
- Grades: 6-12
- Enrollment: 101
- Campuses: South Burlington Main Campus, Charlotte Outdoor Education Center
- Colors: Green and gray
- Sports: Volleyball, Basketball, Ultimate, Cross Country
- Mascot: Flying Turtles
- Accreditation: Association of Independent Schools of New England, National Association of Independent Schools
- Website: Vermont Commons School

Vermont Commons School is an independent college preparatory school located in South Burlington, Vermont, serving grades 6–12.

== History ==
Vermont Commons School was founded in 1997. Its Founder and first Head of School was former Champlain College President Robert A. Skiff. During its first semester, 32 students were enrolled and the school grew steadily in size and offerings over the next ten years. In 2007, Skiff retired, and was succeeded by Peter Ross, who served as Head of School through the fall of 2008. Upon Ross's departure, Science and Math teacher Hans Manske served as Acting Head while the Board of Trustees conducted a search for new leadership. In July 2009, the Board selected Peter Gilmore as their new Head of School. Gilmore had previously served as Principal of The Friends School of Baltimore and Upper School Director at Berwick Academy in South Berwick, Maine. After five years of solid growth approaching 100 students and including accreditation by the New England Association of Independent Schools (NEASC) and membership in the National Association of Independent Schools (NAIS), Gilmore left the school at the end of the 2013–14 school year, and was succeeded by Dr. Dexter Mahaffey. A journalist and educator, Mahaffey previously worked in public and private schools and taught at the university level around the United States, most recently serving as Director of Diversity and Global Studies at Kentucky Country Day School from 2007 to 2014. Dr. Mahaffey is past Vice President of the Vermont Independent Schools Association and former Chair of the Council of Independent Schools for the Vermont Agency of Education. In the 2015-16 academic year, the school added the 6th grade to its academic program, exceeded 100 enrolled students, and began Sister School relationships with Colegio Santa Ana in Lima, Peru, and Pioneer Learning Community in Chengdu, China. In the 2021-22 academic year the school celebrated its 25th year, and in early 2023 school year, Vermont Commons received a ten-year re-accreditation through NEASC. In the summer of 2023, the school received accreditation through the Association of Independent Schools of New England through 2033. In 2017 and again in 2022, the E.E. Ford Foundation awarded major grants to the school in support of, respectively, the enrollment and support of Refugee students at the school and through matriculation in higher education and for its campus expansions at 55 Green Mountain Drive and the Outdoor Education Center.

== Organization ==
=== Mission ===
Scholarship. Community. Global Responsibility.

=== Campus ===
Since its founding in 1997, the campus has been located at 75 Green Mountain Drive in South Burlington in a building converted from an environmental testing and consulting firm, Aquatec. Re-purposing such a building was in keeping with the environmental stewardship mission of the school. The school purchased the building and property in the fall of 2010. Vermont Commons School underwent over $1,100,000 in renovations and expansion of the campus and facilities focusing on the arts and sciences in the summer of 2015. A further substantial renovation and addition of classrooms, a college counseling center, and a new tutoring/counseling space was completed early in the 2019–20 school year. In September 2020, the school acquired 55 acres in Charlotte for its Outdoor Education Center. In late 2021, the school acquired a property adjacent to its original building in South Burlington, expanding its main campus to five acres consisting of two buildings, outdoor recreation space, a gymnasium, and woods.

=== Grade structure ===
Classes are taught by grade, with larger grades broken into smaller sections. Maximum class size is 18 students, with an average class size of 12 students.

=== Curriculum ===
Courses include English and Literature, Mathematics, Sciences, Social Studies, Music and Fine Arts, Spanish, Health, and several electives. The school offers advanced Honors study in many subjects, including English, Biology, Environmental Science, Spanish and Chinese Language and Literature, and Calculus. The school considers its 'standard' rank classes to be on par with an Honors program in the public sector.

The school has gained recognition for its Research and Service community service program. In addition, Vermont Commons School offers 3 "Encounter Weeks" during the year. The faculty and students leave the confines of the school to dive deeply into a variety of experiences. These can range from snow-shoeing in the Northeast Kingdom of Vermont to studying the Abrahamic religions in New York City, doing service work with Habitat for Humanity in the 9th Ward in New Orleans, studying tidal pool ecology in Acadia National Park, or exchanges with Sister Schools Colegio Santa Ana and Pioneer in China.

=== Accreditation ===
Vermont Commons School is accredited by the National Association of Independent Schools (NAIS) and the Association of Independent Schools of New England (AISNE). It maintains "recognized school" status through the State of Vermont.

== Tuition ==
Tuition for the 2023-2024 academic year is $27,900 for 6th-8th grades and $31,900 for 9th-12th grades.
