= Louvenia Bright =

American politician (1941–2023)

Member of the Vermont House of Representatives
- In office 1988–1994

Personal details
- Born: November 21, 1941 Chicago, U.S.
- Died: July 29, 2023 (aged 81) Park Forest, Illinois, U.S.
- Party: Democratic
- Occupation: Politician

Louvenia Dorsey Bright (November 21, 1941 – July 29, 2023) was an American politician who served in the Vermont House of Representatives from 1988 to 1994. She was Vermont's first Black woman legislator.

== Life and career ==
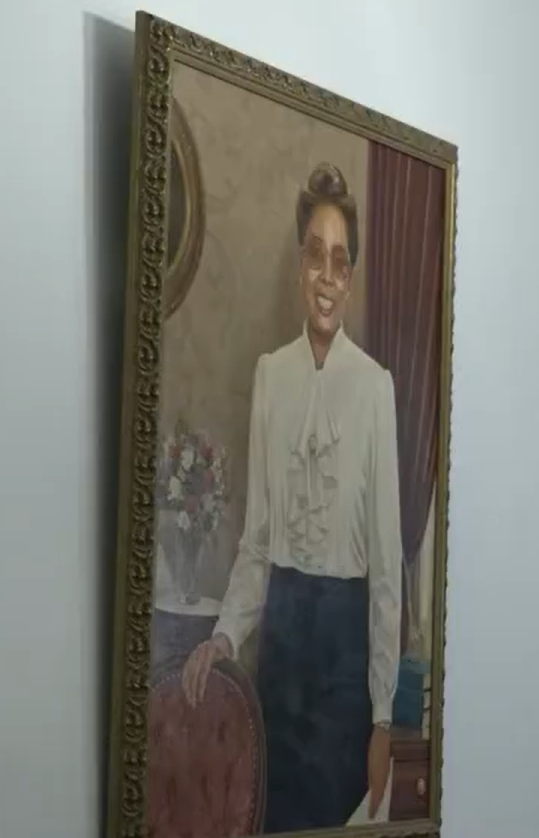
A portrait of Bright hung in the Vermont State House to honor her

Bright was born to Emma Mae Lee and Harold Dorsey in Chicago on November 21, 1941. She grew up in Robbins, Illinois, and Niles, Michigan, and graduated with honors from Detroit Eastern High School. She graduated from Highland Park Junior College and went on to graduate from Wayne State University with a bachelor's degree in business education in 1965 and a master's degree in education in 1971. She later earned a certificate of advanced studies in education administration from the University of Vermont.

Bright moved to Vermont from Detroit in 1971 when her husband, William E. Bright, accepted a professorship of education at the University of Vermont. She taught business education at Colchester High School and Burlington High School, raised two children, and advocated for racial and gender equality. She served on the Vermont State Advisory Committee to the U.S. Commission on Civil Rights and held leadership roles in the Burlington NAACP.

A Democrat, Bright represented South Burlington for three terms in the Vermont House of Representatives from 1988 to 1994, becoming the first Black woman and first woman of color to serve in the Vermont General Assembly. As ranking member of the House's Health and Welfare Committee, Bright stewarded passage of Vermont's first parental and family leave legislature. She also served on the Government Operations Committee.

In 1995, she retired and left Vermont with her husband. She died at her home in Park Forest, Illinois, on July 29, 2023.
