= Rockledge =

Rockledge may refer to:

- Rockledge, Florida, United States
- Rockledge, Georgia, an unincorporated community
- Rockledge Drive Residential District, a historic district on the National Register of Historic Places in Rockledge, Florida
- Rockledge, Pennsylvania, United States
- Rockledge, name of the chapter house of Alpha Sigma Phi fraternity at Cornell University
- Rockledge (Louisville, Kentucky), a building on the National Register of Historic Places
- Rockledge (Hagerstown, Maryland), a building on the National Register of Historic Places
- Rockledge (Swanton, Vermont), a building on the National Register of Historic Places
- Rockledge (Occoquan, Virginia), a building on the National Register of Historic Places
- Carlisle-Rockledge, Alabama, a census-designated place
