= Quincy Hotel =

- U.S. National Register of Historic Places
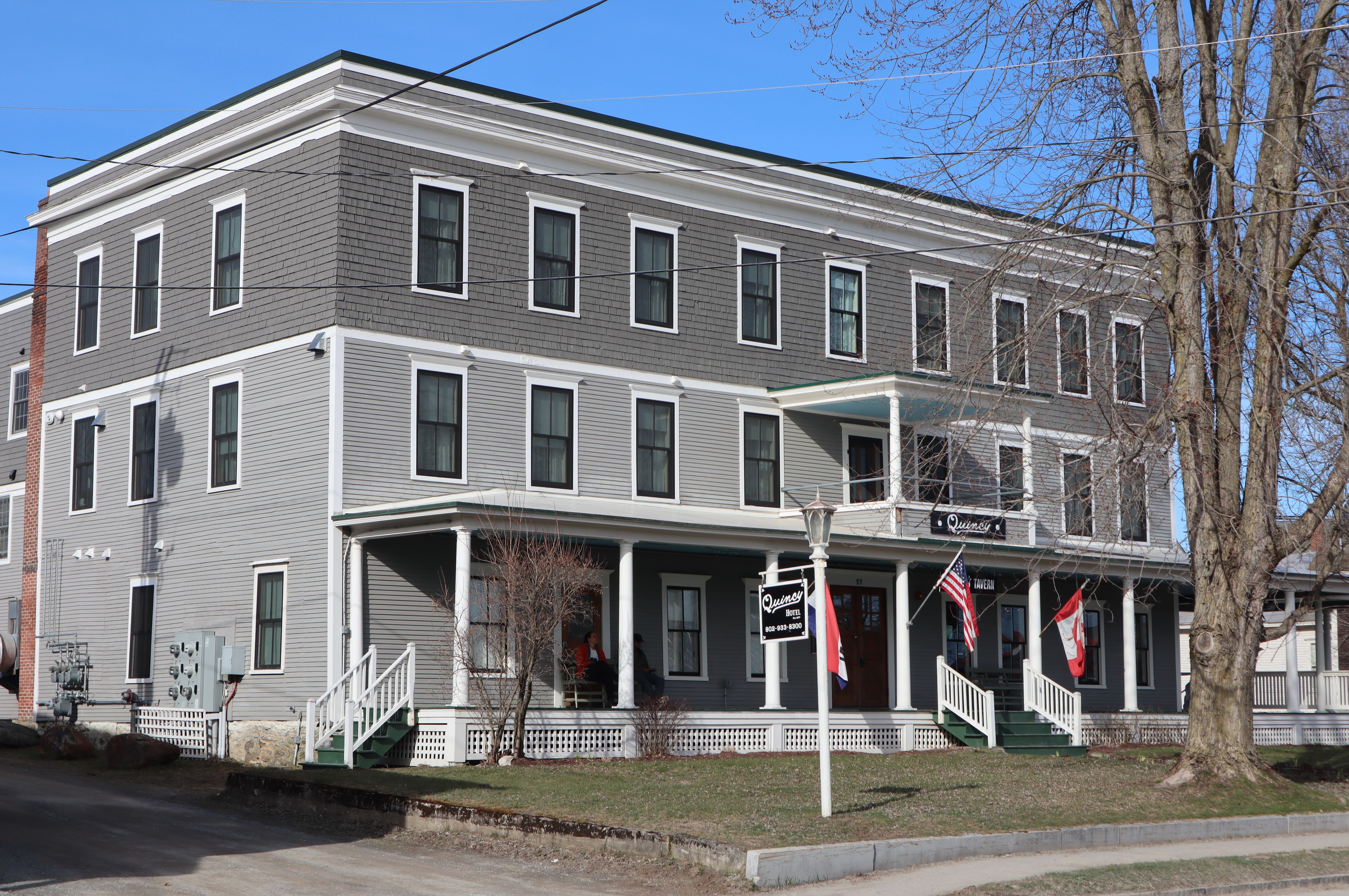
- Quincy Hotel in 2024

- Location within Vermont Location within the United States
- Location: 57 Depot St., Enosburgh, Vermont
- Coordinates: 44°54′30″N 72°48′12″W
- Area: less than one acre
- Built: 1876
- Architectural style: Second Empire; Colonial Revival
- NRHP reference No.: 100003415
- Added to NRHP: February 4, 2019

The Quincy Hotel is a historic commercial building at 57 Depot Street in the Enosburg Falls village of Enosburgh, Vermont. Built about 1876 in the Second Empire style, it was restyled after a fire in the early 20th century to its present Colonial Revival appearance to a design by Vermont architect Lewis Newton. It was listed on the National Register of Historic Places in 2019 for its architectural significance.

== Description and history ==
The Quincy Hotel is located in the center of the village of Enosburg Falls, on the north side of Depot Street between Vermont Route 108N and Archambault Street. It is located across the street from the former railroad right-of-way of the Missisquoi Railroad, now the Missisquoi Valley Rail Trail. The building is a roughly U-shaped wood-frame structure, three stories in height, with a low-pitch hip roof and clapboarded exterior. A single-story porch extends across the nine-bay front facade, supported by Tuscan columns. It extends beyond the building to the right side to form a porte-cochere. Three-story wings, later additions from its original construction, extend to the rear.

The hotel was built about 1876, following the arrival of the railroad in the village, an event which resulted in population and economic growth. It was built by B.J. Kendall, owner of a local liniment manufacturer. Originally Second Empire in style, its third floor, which originally housed a ballroom space, was extensively damaged by fire in 1923. The owners responded by retaining Vermont architect Louis Newton to replace the third floor and transform it into the then-popular Colonial Revival style. The building's usage mirrored the level of railroad activity through the town, declining to a low level once the railroad stopped running in 1984.

== See also ==
- National Register of Historic Places listings in Franklin County, Vermont
