= Hathaway's Tavern =

Historic tavern in Vermont, United States

- U.S. National Register of Historic Places
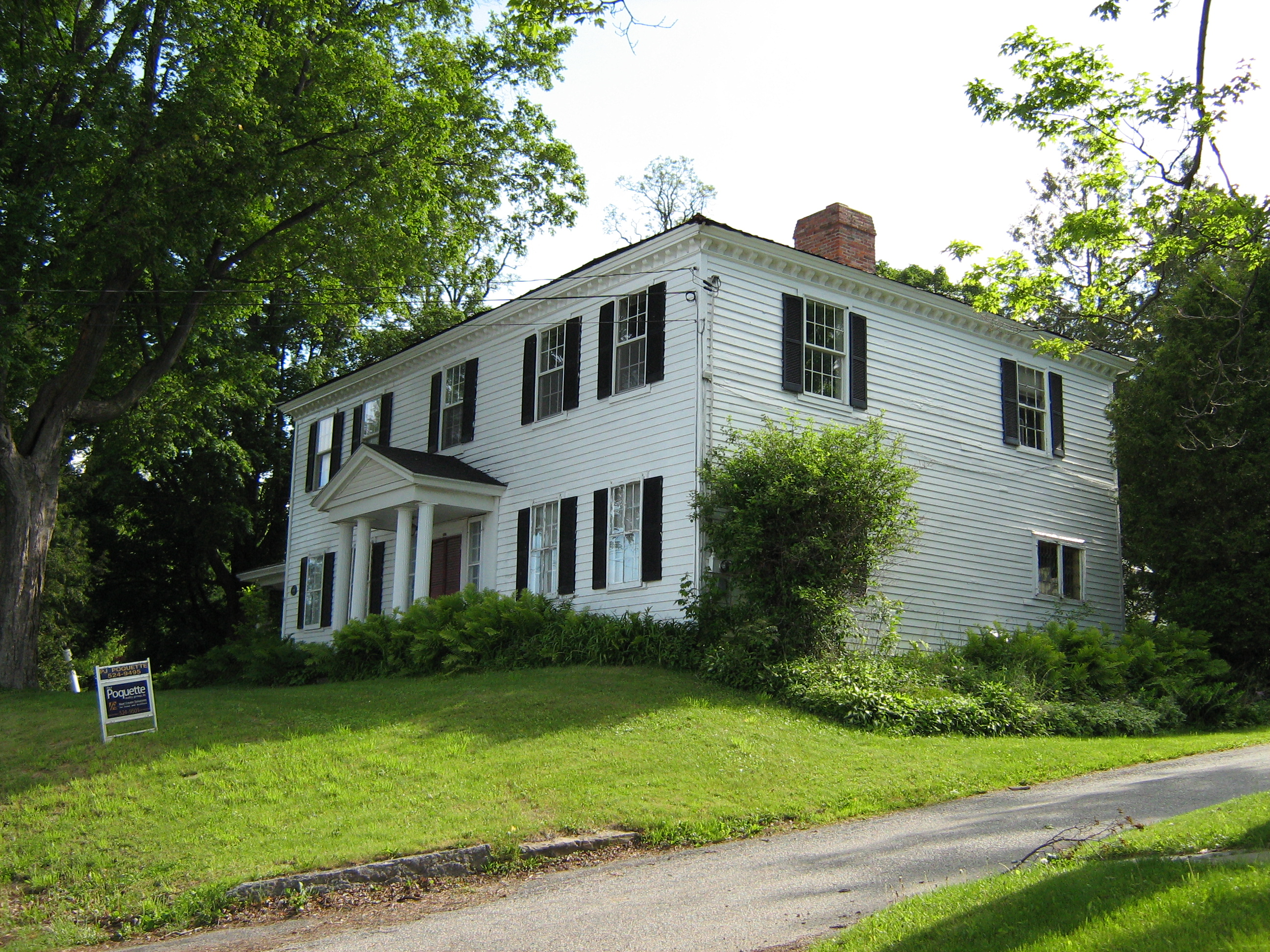

- Location within Vermont Location within the United States
- Location: 255 N. Main St., St. Albans, Vermont
- Coordinates: 44°49′21″N 73°4′52″W
- Area: 0.8 acres (0.32 ha)
- Built: 1793
- Architectural style: Federal
- NRHP reference No.: 83003209
- Added to NRHP: July 14, 1983

Hathaway's Tavern is a historic public accommodation at 255 North Main Street in the city of St. Albans, Vermont, United States. Built in 1793, it is the city's oldest surviving building, and was briefly used as the seat of the Franklin County government. A private residence since 1805, it was listed on the National Register of Historic Places in 1983.

== Description and history ==
The former Hathaway's Tavern house stands near the northern city limit of St. Albans, on the east side of North Main Street south of Lakeview Terrace. The building is prominently situated on top of a low knoll near the road, a contrast to both surrounding commercial development to the north and west, and to residential development to the south that is generally set further back from the street on level lots. It is a two-story wood-frame structure with a hip roof and clapboarded exterior. The roof cornice is decorated with modillions, and the centered front entrance is flanked by sidelight windows and sheltered by a gabled Colonial Revival portico. The interior of the house is a modified Georgian center hall plan, with large central halls that acted as entertainment spaces when the building was used as a tavern, and were altered to accommodate domestic uses upon conversion to a residence.

Silas Hathaway was a wealthy English immigrant who came to the St. Albans area in 1788. He purchased a farm on North Main Street in 1789, and built this tavern in 1793. It has a hand-hewn timber frame, with sawn wood that was shipped via Lake Champlain from a sawmill in Whitehall, New York. He eventually moved to Swanton, where he owned several mills, suffered financial reverses, and died penniless in 1831. Between 1797 and 1801 the tavern was the meeting place for the county court of Franklin County, and it also served for a time as the post office. It was purchased in 1800 by Asa Fuller, who continued to operate the tavern until 1805, when he sold the building to Doctor Julius Hathaway. Hathaway undertook conversion of the building to a residence, and it remained in the hands of his descendants until 1931.

== See also ==
- National Register of Historic Places listings in Franklin County, Vermont
