= St. Albans Town Hall =

- U.S. National Register of Historic Places
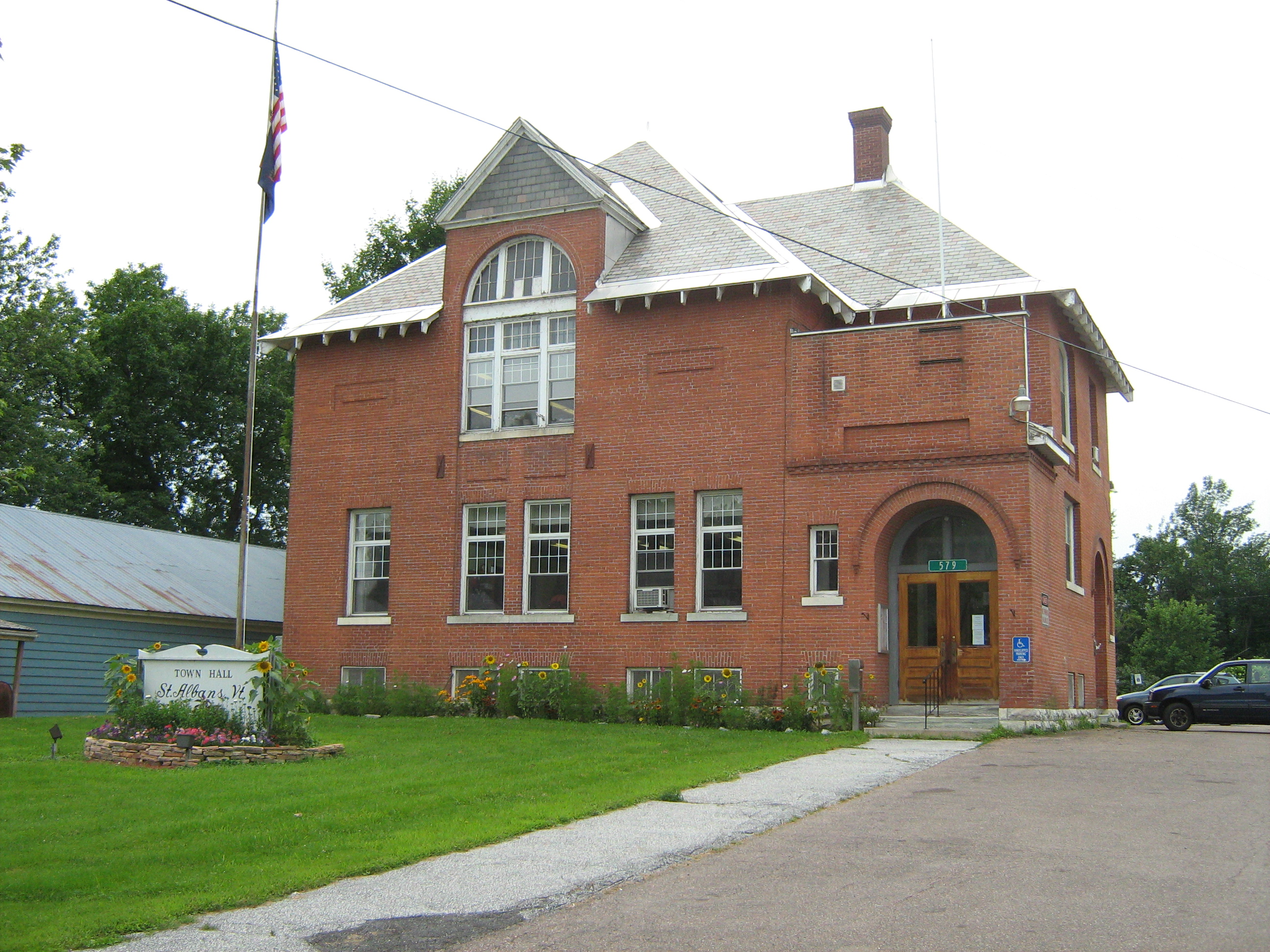

- Location within Vermont Location within the United States
- Location: 579 Lake Rd., St. Albans, Vermont
- Coordinates: 44°48′30″N 73°8′20″W
- Area: less than one acre
- Built: 1898
- Architect: Smith, Arthur H.
- Architectural style: Romanesque
- MPS: Historic Government Buildings MPS
- NRHP reference No.: 96000257
- Added to NRHP: March 14, 1996

St. Albans Town Hall is the center of government of the town of St. Albans, Vermont. It is located at 579 Lake Road (Vermont Route 36) in the village of St. Albans Bay. It is a Richardsonian Romanesque building, constructed in 1898, two years after the city of St. Albans, the former town center, was politically separated. The building was listed on the National Register of Historic Places in 1996.

== Description and history ==
St. Albans Town Hall is located on the west side of Lake Road in St. Albans Bay, at the southwest corner with Cherry Street. It is built of brick on a limestone foundation, and is two stories in height with a hip roof. It is basically T-shaped with a horizontally oriented front section and a projecting ell at the center of the rear. The main facade has a double-door entrance recessed in a rounded arch on the right, and five sash window bays across the rest of the facade. The only windows on the second level are a band of three windows above two of the lower ones, above which a half-round window is mounted in the same opening, rising into a flush gable dormer. The slate roof has extended eaves with visible rafter ends. The interior retains a significant number of original features despite 20th-century alterations.

The town of St. Albans was first settled in 1778, at the site of St. Albans Bay, and was for many years the town's principal economic hub, serving as a port on Lake Champlain. St. Albans Village, located 3 miles (4.8 km) to the east, was its original civic center and the seat of the Franklin County government. The Village eclipsed the Bay in importance due to the introduction of the railroad there, and was separately incorporated as the city of St. Albans in 1896. This left the town with no civic government buildings and a shortage of public school buildings. The present town hall was designed by Vermont architect Arthur H. Smith to address both of these issues, and was completed in 1898. It housed town offices, a graded elementary school, and an auditorium on the second floor. It was used as a school until 1961, when a new school was opened, and that space was converted into additional office space for the town.

== See also ==
- National Register of Historic Places listings in Franklin County, Vermont
