= Enosburg Congregational Memorial Church =

Historic church in Vermont, United States

- U.S. National Register of Historic Places
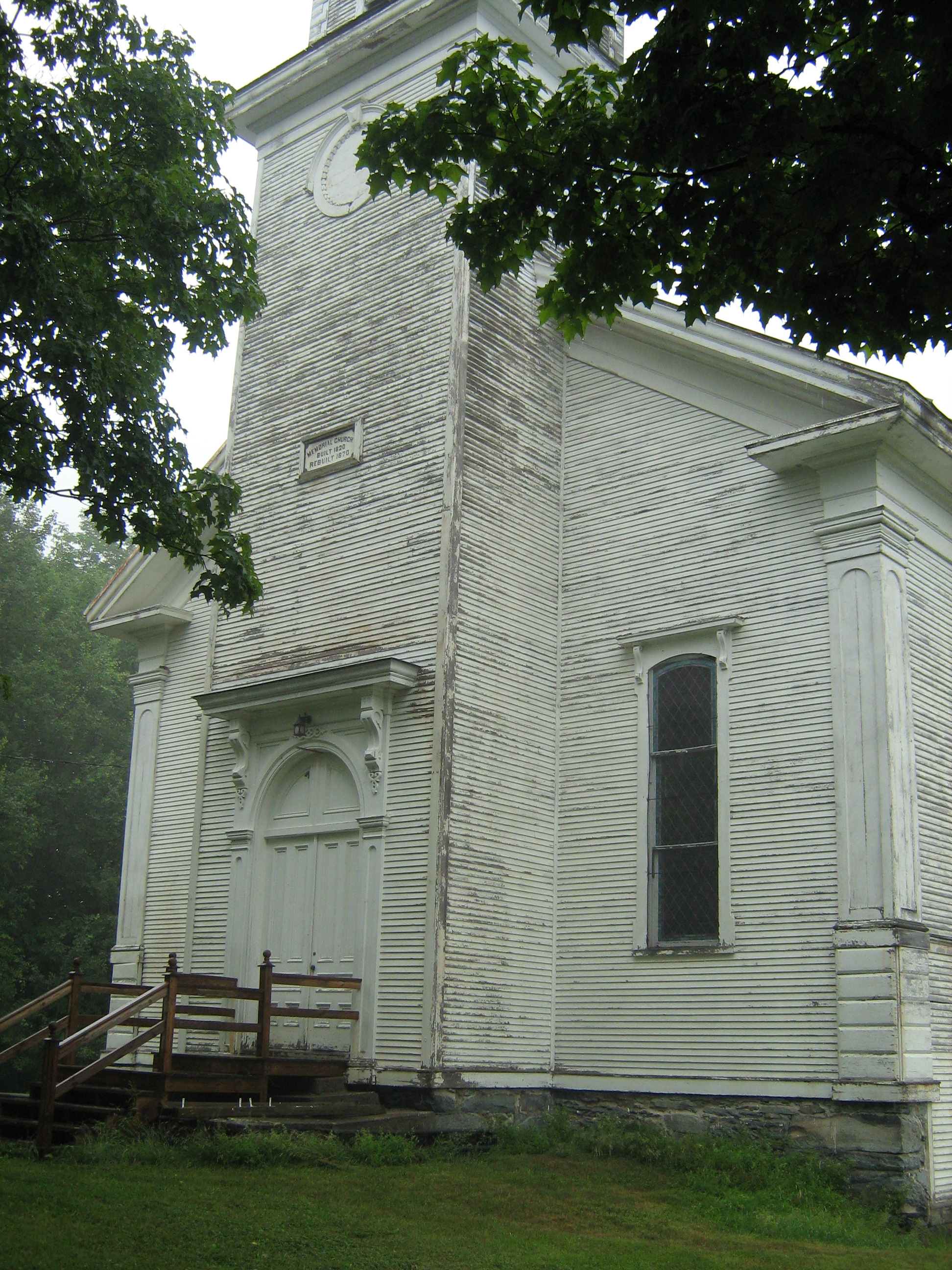
- Front of the church

- Location within Vermont Location within the United States
- Location: TH No. 2 (Boston Post Rd.), Enosburg, Vermont
- Coordinates: 44°52′58″N 72°45′15″W
- Area: 1 acre (0.40 ha)
- Built: 1870
- Architectural style: Italianate
- MPS: Religious Buildings, Sites and Structures in Vermont MPS
- NRHP reference No.: 01000222
- Added to NRHP: March 2, 2001

The Enosburg Congregational Memorial Church is a historic church on Boston Post Road in Enosburg, Vermont. Built in 1820 and expanded fifty years later, it is a prominent example of ecclesiastical Italianate architecture. It was listed on the National Register of Historic Places in 2001.

== Description and history ==
The Enosburg Congregational Memorial Church stands in the rural crossroads hamlet of Enosburg Center, on the east side of Boston Post Road south of its junction with Grange Hall and Nichols Roads. It is a single-story wood-frame structure, three bays wide and three deep, with a gabled roof and clapboarded exterior. A square tower projects from the center of the main facade, rising unadorned to a point above the roof ridge , where three sides have blind oculus panels below an entablature and cornice. Above the cornice is a shallow roof around the smaller belfry, which has round-arch louvered openings below a cornice. Above that rises an eight-sided steeple, set on an eight-sided base. The main entrance is on the ground floor of the tower, set under a hood with Italianate brackets. Windows are tall and narrow, set in segmented arch openings.

The Enosburg Congregational Church was established in 1811, and its first permanent sanctuary was built on this site in 1820, shared by the local Episcopal Church. The latter congregation left in 1821, building its own church elsewhere in the town. The Congregationalists grew in number, and their church underwent major repairs in 1849–50. By 1870 space was acknowledged to be too small, and the building was transformed into its present appearance at a cost of about $10,000. Significant alterations included raising the tower to include a belfry and steeple, and an addition to the rear to enlarge the sanctuary. This work was all done when the congregation was near its height in terms of size.

== See also ==
- National Register of Historic Places listings in Franklin County, Vermont
