= Dr. B. J. Kendall Company =

- U.S. National Register of Historic Places
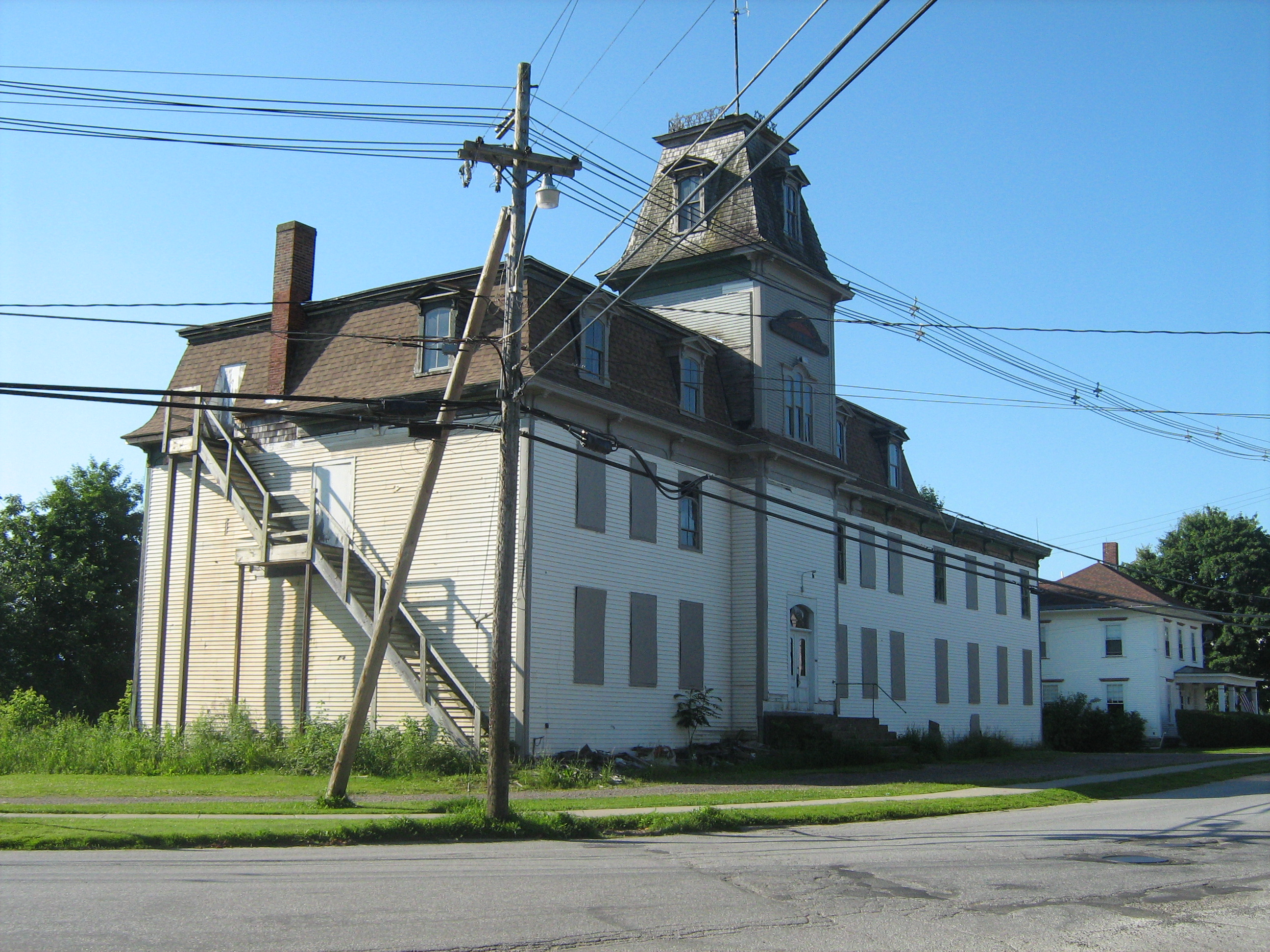

- Location within Vermont Location within the United States
- Location: 228 N. Main St., Enosburgh, Vermont
- Coordinates: 44°54′40″N 72°48′12″W
- Area: less than one acre
- Built: 1880
- Architectural style: Second Empire
- NRHP reference No.: 93000721
- Added to NRHP: August 2, 1993

The Dr. B.J. Kendall Company is a historic industrial facility at 228 North Main Street in the Enosburg Falls village of Enosburgh, Vermont. Built in 1880, it was for many years the site where "Kendall's Spavin Cure", a treatment for a horse ailment, was manufactured and marketed. This business was one of the town's economic successes, its owners contributing significantly to its architectural heritage. The building was listed on the National Register of Historic Places in 1993; as of 2016, it is standing vacant.

== Description and history ==
The former Dr. B.J. Kendall Company building stands prominently near the northern end of Enosburg Falls, on the east side of North Main Street (Vermont Route 108N) at its junction with Sampsonville Road. It is a two-story wood frame structure, whose main portion is covered by a mansard roof, under which a full third floor is provided. An extending ell is covered by a flat roof. The exterior is covered in vinyl siding, which was laid over the original clapboards, and rests on a stone foundation. A slightly projecting square tower rises from the center of the seven-bay main section, also capped by a mansard roof. Windows in both the main and tower roof are framed by scrolled moulding and topped by gabled pediments. Some iron cresting survives at the top of the tower. The interior of the building retains a number of features original to its construction, including an elevator, fireproof vaults, and a speaking tube.

The factory was built in 1880. Dr. B.J. Kendall, an Enosburg Falls native, had returned to his home community in the 1870s, and was operating a drug store when he developed a liniment for the treatment of bone spavin, an ailment causing lameness in horses. Meeting with local success in its sale, he sought to expand, and built this factory with the financial aid of local investors. The business was a major success, its products marketed across from the east coast to the Rocky Mountains. Kendall and the other proprietors built fine houses in the town, and funded construction of the Enosburg Opera House. With the rise of the automobile in the first half of the 20th century, demand for the company product declined, and it closed its doors in 1957.

== See also ==
- National Register of Historic Places listings in Franklin County, Vermont
