= District No. 2 School (Georgia, Vermont) =

- U.S. National Register of Historic Places
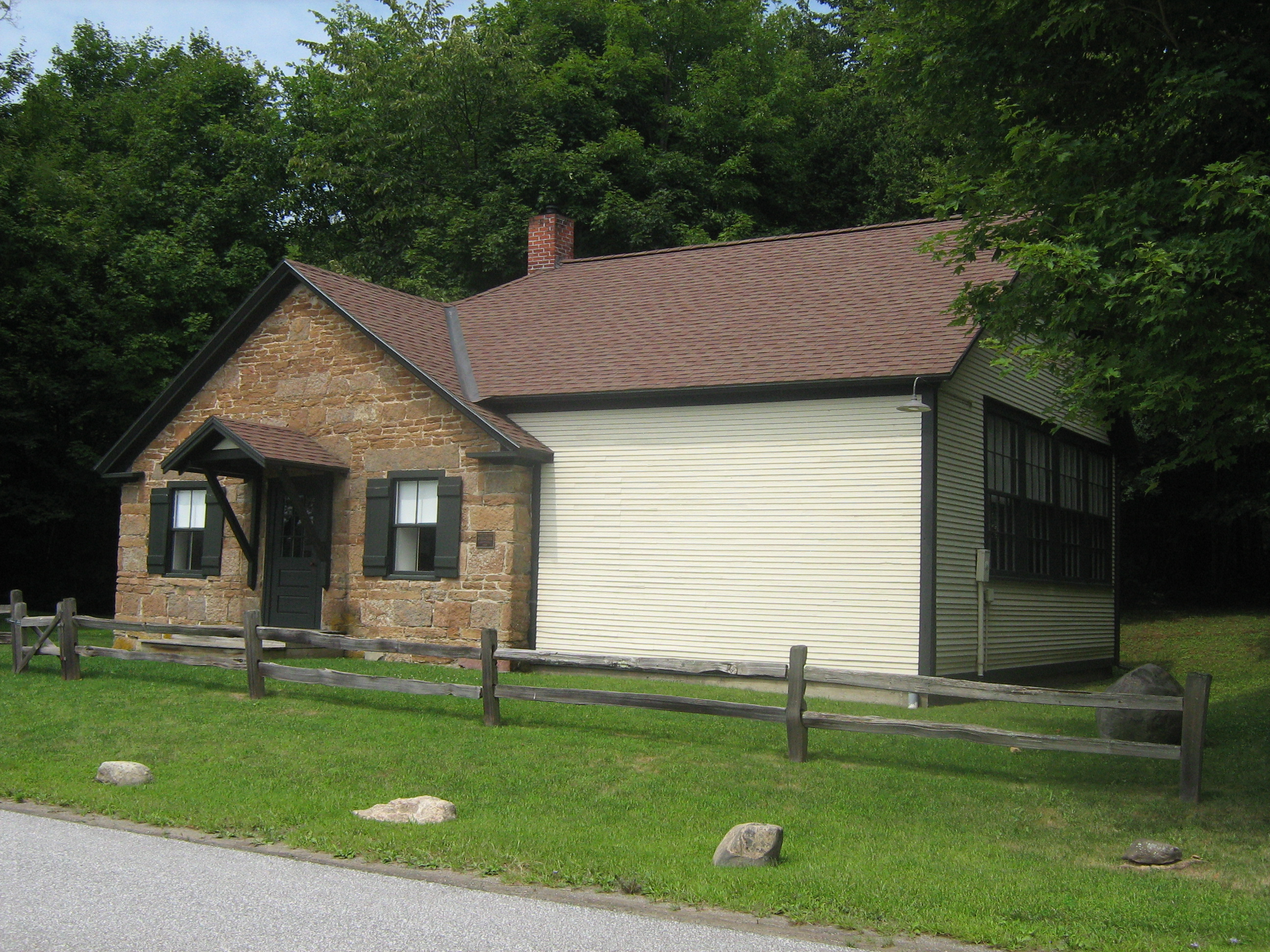

- Location within Vermont Location within the United States
- Location: 2442 Polly Hubbard Rd., Georgia, Vermont
- Coordinates: 44°45′22″N 73°9′24″W
- Area: 1 acre (0.40 ha)
- Built: 1843
- Built by: Weightman, Adam and John; Roberts, Alonzo
- Architectural style: Greek Revival
- MPS: Educational Resources of Vermont MPS
- NRHP reference No.: 00000063
- Added to NRHP: February 4, 2000

The District No. 2 School is a historic school building at 2442 Polly Hubbard Road in Georgia, Vermont. Built in 1843 and enlarged in 1931, it is a good local example of mid-19th century vernacular Greek Revival school architecture. It was restored in the 1990s after being abandoned for some years, and was listed on the National Register of Historic Places in 2000.

== Description and history ==
The former District No. 2 School stands in a rural of western Georgia, on the north side of Polly Hubbard Road, with a wooded area around its small clearing to the north, and open fields to the south. It is a single-story building, with a stone main block and wood-frame ell. The stone block is fashioned out of random coursed local limestone with ashlar finish, and is covered by a front facing gabled roof. The main facade is symmetrical, with a center entrance flanked by sash windows and sheltered by a simple gabled hood. The ell is finished in wooden clapboards, and is covered by cross-gabled roof. It has a bank of sash windows on its east-facing facade. The interior is largely a reproduction of its 1931 appearance, the result of a major restoration in 1997–98.

The stone portion of the school was built in 1843, after many years of the district students being educated in informal spaces. It was built by three local residents, using stone from a quarry a few miles away. It was enlarged in 1931, after improvements in school building standards were mandated by the state. This resulted in the construction of the wood-frame ell, which provided suitable lighting and improved sanitation. The school was closed in 1959, when the town's district schools were consolidated into a single graded elementary school. It was thereafter used for a number of years as a seasonal residence, and was then abandoned. It was restored in the 1990s by private owners, and now serves as a nature center.

== See also ==
- National Register of Historic Places listings in Franklin County, Vermont
