= Richwood Estate =

Historic house in Vermont, United States

- U.S. National Register of Historic Places
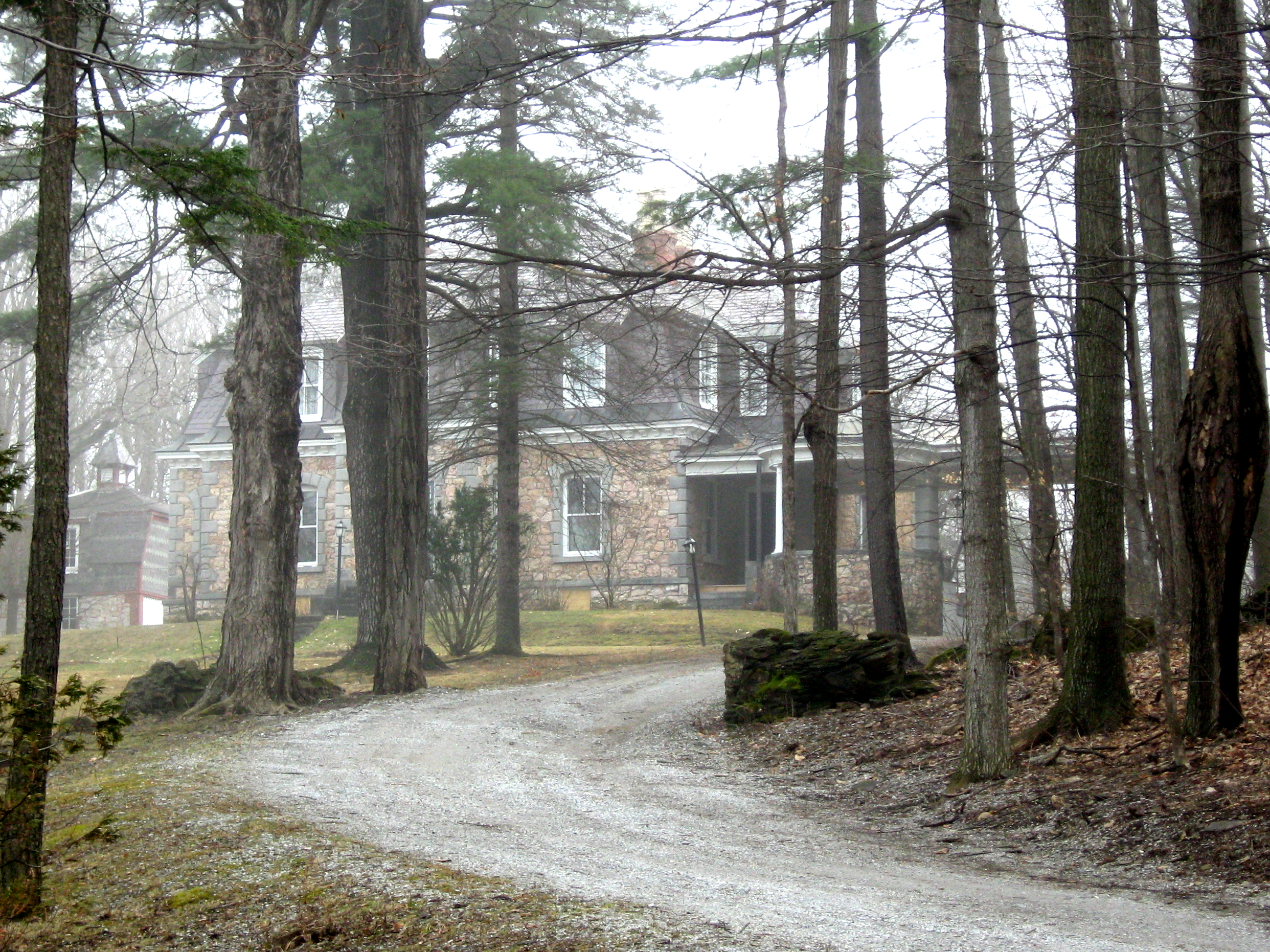

- Location within Vermont Location within the United States
- Location: US 7, Swanton, Vermont
- Coordinates: 44°51′48″N 73°5′48″W
- Area: 9 acres (3.6 ha)
- Built: 1871
- Architectural style: Second Empire
- NRHP reference No.: 88002175
- Added to NRHP: November 3, 1988

The Richwood Estate is a historic house on United States Route 7 in southern Swanton, Vermont. It was built in 1871 for C.W. Rich, owner of a local lime processing company, and is a distinctive example of Second Empire architecture using native materials. It was listed on the National Register of Historic Places in 1988.

== Description and history ==
The Richwood Estate is located in southern Swanton, on the east side of US 7 about 1 mile (1.6 km) north of the border with St. Albans. It is set on 9 acres (3.6 ha) of primarily woodland, between Sugarmaple Drive and Maple Garden Estates. The main house is a 1 1/2-story stone and frame structure, covered by a mansarded hip roof. Its foundation and ground floor are composed of stone from Isle La Motte, with locally quarried redstone trim. The steep edges of the mansard roof are composed of purple slate from Fair Haven, and is pierced by shed-roof dormers. The south-side porch features a round corner pavilion and a porte-cochere. The building's interior features rich woodwork, and an entrance hall inlaid with three colors of native Vermont marble. Northeast of the house stands a carriage house that continues the rich exterior features of the house.

The estate was built in 1871 for C.W. Rich, then Swanton's leading businessman. He had since 1847 operated lime processing kilns in the town, and it was then the town's most economically important business. Richwood was sold out of the family in 1947; the town's lime businesses remained in the family until 1976. The primary alterations to the house are the removal of the original cupola (said to be disliked by Rich's wife), the addition of the porch to the south side in the 1880s, and the introduction of electricity and plumbing to the interior.

== See also ==
- National Register of Historic Places listings in Franklin County, Vermont
