= Warner Home =

- U.S. National Register of Historic Places
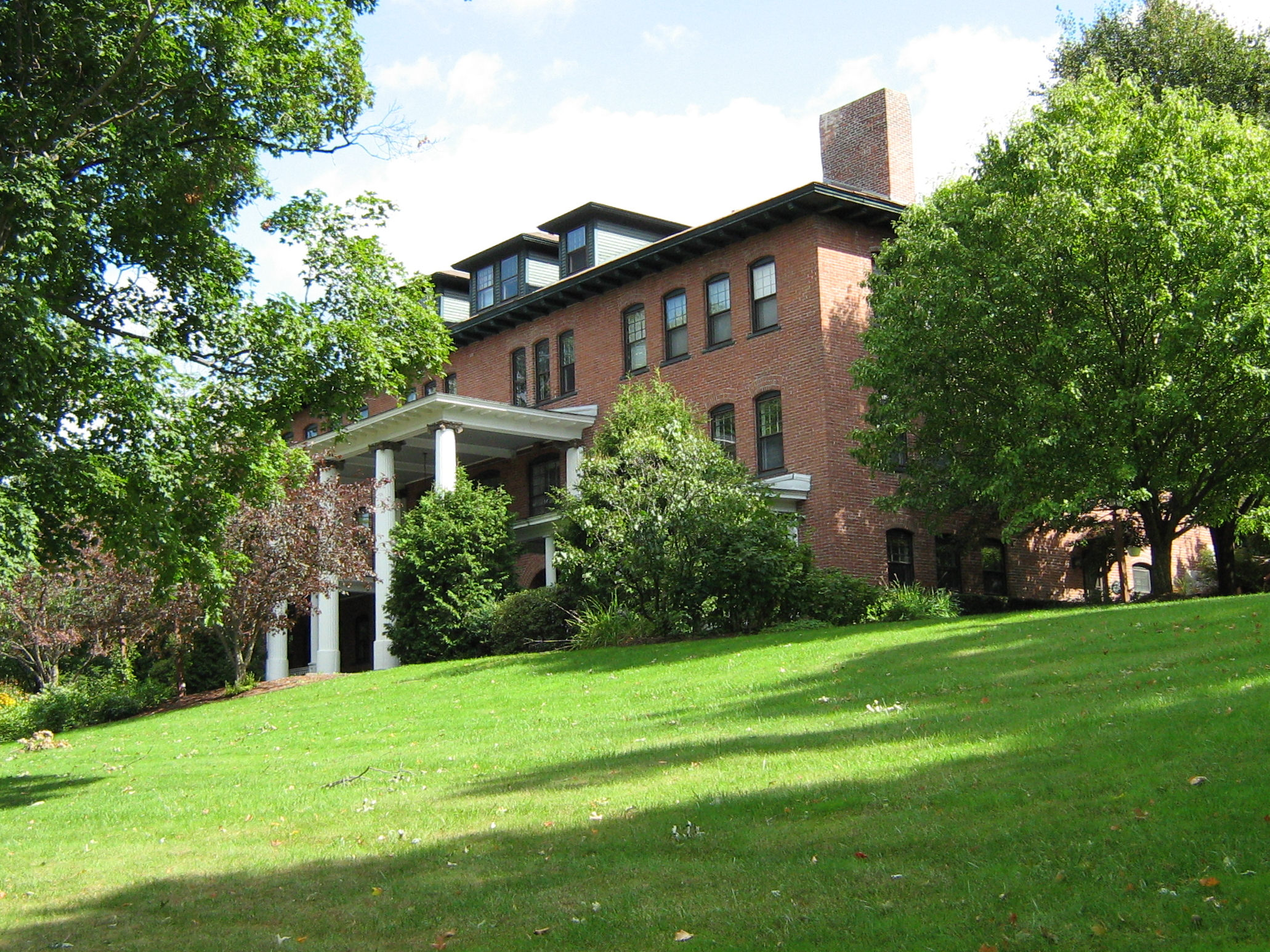

- Location within Vermont Location within the United States
- Location: 133 High St., St. Albans, Vermont
- Coordinates: 44°49′5″N 73°4′36″W
- Area: 1.4 acres (0.57 ha)
- Built: 1902
- Architectural style: Colonial Revival
- NRHP reference No.: 88002034
- Added to NRHP: October 20, 1988

The Warner Home is a historic orphanage building at 133 High Street in the city of St. Albans, Vermont. It was built in 1902, and was one of the region's major orphanages. It was converted to conventional residential use in 1987, and was listed on the National Register of Historic Places for its social significance and fine Colonial Revival architecture in 1988.

== Description and history ==
The Warner Home is located in northeastern St. Albans, at the northeast corner of High Street and Isham Avenue. It is a large three-story brick building, with a hip roof. Its west-facing front facade is dominated by a massive central portico, rising two stories to a modillioned hip roof and supported by fluted columns and pilasters. It is flanked on either side single-story porches, supported by smaller versions of similar columns. Windows are set in segmented-arch openings, with brick headers and wooden sills. The interior has retained many original finishes and features, despite modernizations in the 1950s and 1960s, and the conversion of the building to residential use in 1987.

The Warner Home was established in St. Albans in 1882 by bequest of Chauncey Warner of Cambridge, Vermont. It was originally located in a large Italianate building elsewhere in the city, which burned down in 1900. The present building was constructed at a cost of $20,000, using the last funds from Warner's bequest and money raised by subscription. The building as originally outfitted included bedrooms, classrooms, playrooms, and other public spaces. It was described at the time as one of the most prominent institutions of its type in northern New England. The building was converted into condominiums in 1987-88, retaining most of the room layout and restoring the central lobby.

== See also ==
- National Register of Historic Places listings in Franklin County, Vermont
