= Sweat-Comings Company House =

Historic house in Vermont, United States

- U.S. National Register of Historic Places
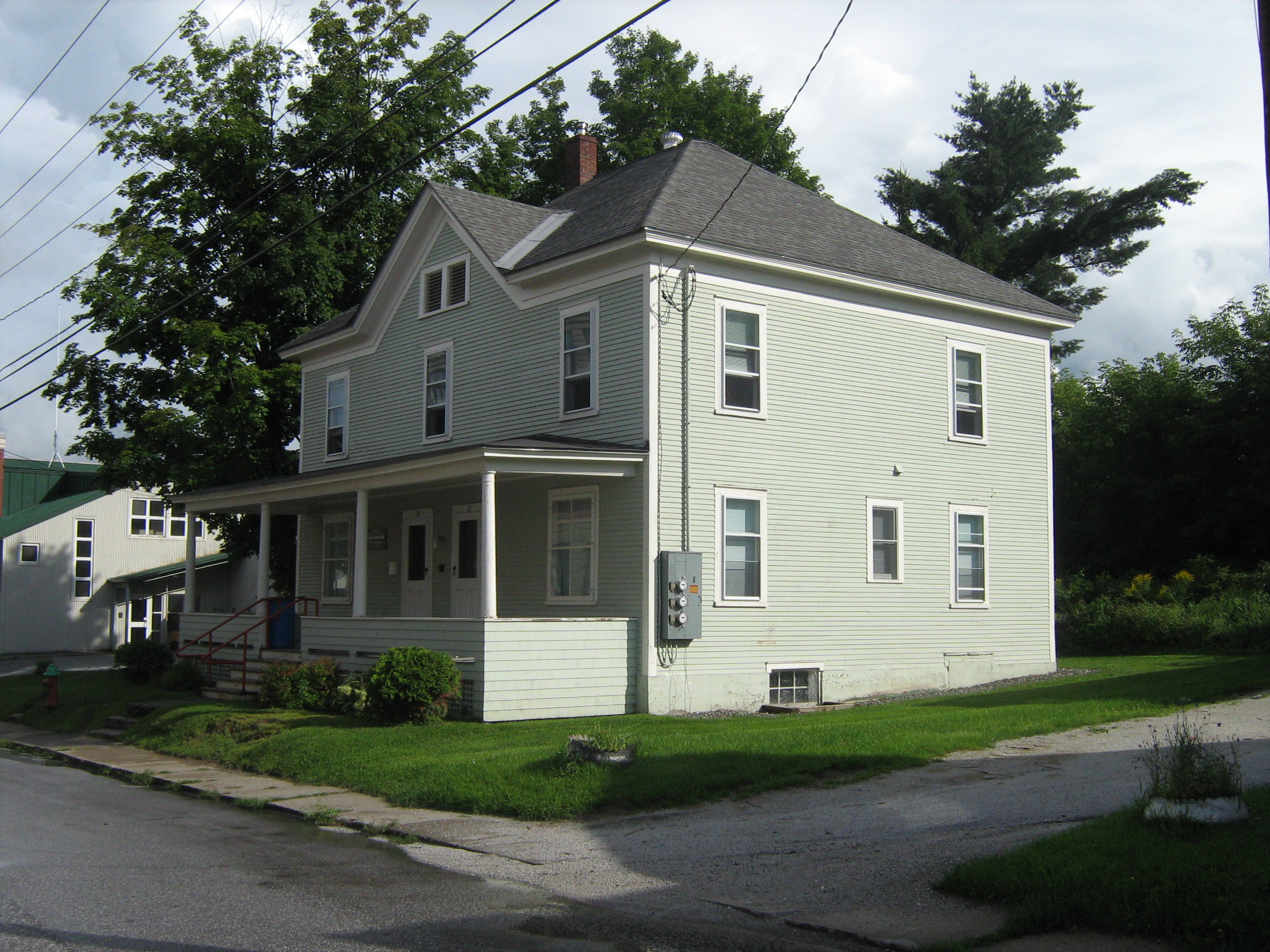

- Location within Vermont Location within the United States
- Location: 10-12 Powell St., Richford, Vermont
- Coordinates: 44°59′46″N 72°40′27″W
- Area: 0.1 acres (0.040 ha)
- Built: 1909
- Architectural style: Colonial Revival
- NRHP reference No.: 04000444
- Added to NRHP: May 12, 2004

The Sweat-Comings Company House is a historic two-family house at 10–12 Powell Street in Richford, Vermont. Built in 1909, it is a rare surviving example of an early company-built boarding house. It was sold into private ownership in 1924, and is a good local example of vernacular Colonial Revival architecture. It was listed on the National Register of Historic Places in 2004.

== Description and history ==
The Sweat-Comings Company House stands in the Richford's main village, on the south side of Powell Street, a residential street just off Main Street. The house is a two-story wood-frame structure, with a hip roof and clapboarded exterior. Its main facade is three bays wide, with sash windows in the upper floor, and sash windows flanking a pair of entrances in the center bay on the ground floor. A single-story hip-roofed porch extends across the front, with a shingled skirt and round posts. A gable rises in the roof above the central bay, with a small window at its center. The interior retains a number of original finishes, including hardwood floors, trim elements, plaster walls, and a French door in the downstairs unit.

The house was built in 1909, after a fire swept through Richford in 1907, destroying part of its downtown and the Sweat-Comings factory complex, located between Powell Street and the Missisquoi River. The factory complex was rebuilt in 1909, and this house was built next to it, on the site of a tenement house that had also been burned. According to local histories, this house was at first home to the factory's night watchman, and also served as a boarding house for single workers. It was moved in 1924 to its present location, roughly across the street from its original position. An attached garage was moved to a different location in Richford.

== See also ==
- National Register of Historic Places listings in Franklin County, Vermont
