= Memorial United Methodist Church =

Historic church in Vermont, United States

- Methodist Episcopal Church
- U.S. National Register of Historic Places
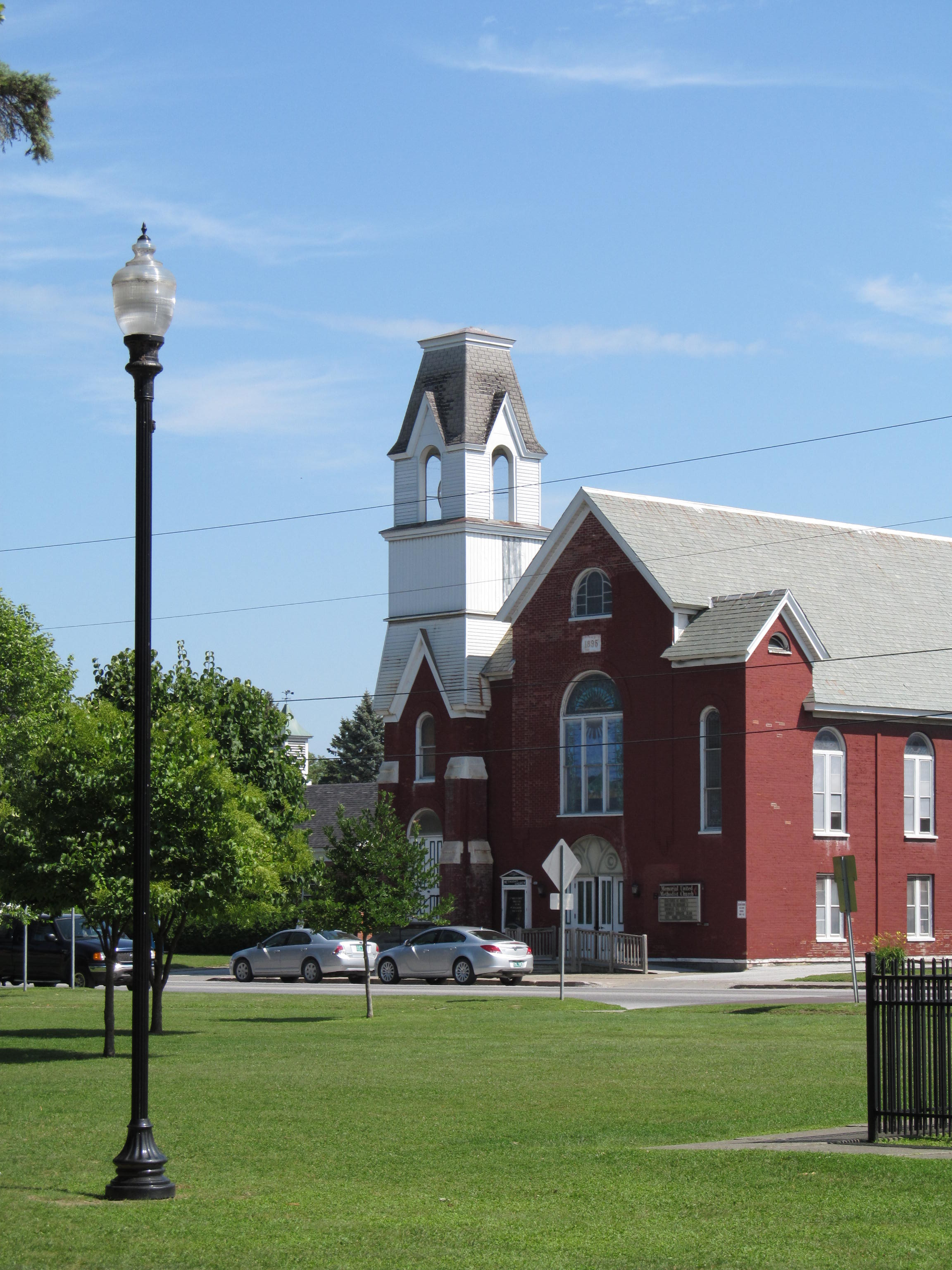

- Location within Vermont Location within the United States
- Location: 23 Grand Ave., Swanton Village, Vermont
- Coordinates: 44°55′7″N 73°7′30″W
- Area: less than one acre
- Built: 1895
- Architectural style: Queen Anne
- MPS: Religious Buildings, Sites and Structures in Vermont MPS
- NRHP reference No.: 01000219
- Added to NRHP: March 2, 2001

The Memorial United Methodist Church is a historic church in the village of Swanton, Vermont. Built in 1895, it is an architecturally distinctive example of Queen Anne architecture executed in brick. It was listed on the National Register of Historic Places in 2001.

== Description and history ==
The Swanton Methodist Episcopal Church faces Swanton's village green, between the post office and the public library on the east side of Grand Avenue. It is a 2-1/2 story brick building, with a gabled roof and black marble foundation. It has an asymmetrical facade, with a projecting square tower at the left corner. The tower's lower stages are brick with corner buttresses, while the upper levels are framed in wood. A belfry stage has open rounded arches capped by gables, and the tower is topped by a mansard roof. The main facade has rounded-arch openings for both doors and windows, with entrances in the tower base and at its center. Above the main entrance is a large stained glass window. Rounded arch windows are also found on the upper level of the sides.

Swanton's Methodist congregation has a history beginning with a circuit-riding priest in 1806, who led services in the local schoolhouse. The congregation was formally organized in 1815, and met in a building owned by Elisha Barney, a local mill owner. From 1822 until 1847 the congregation met in a union church shared with three other congregations. Its first dedicated church was built on this site in 1847 and replaced by a larger building in 1886. The present church was built in 1895 after that building was destroyed by a fire begun in a nearby hotel. The previous building's pews and several stained glass windows were saved from destruction.

== See also ==
- National Register of Historic Places listings in Franklin County, Vermont
