= Solomon Goodrich Homestead =

Historic house in Vermont, United States

- U.S. National Register of Historic Places
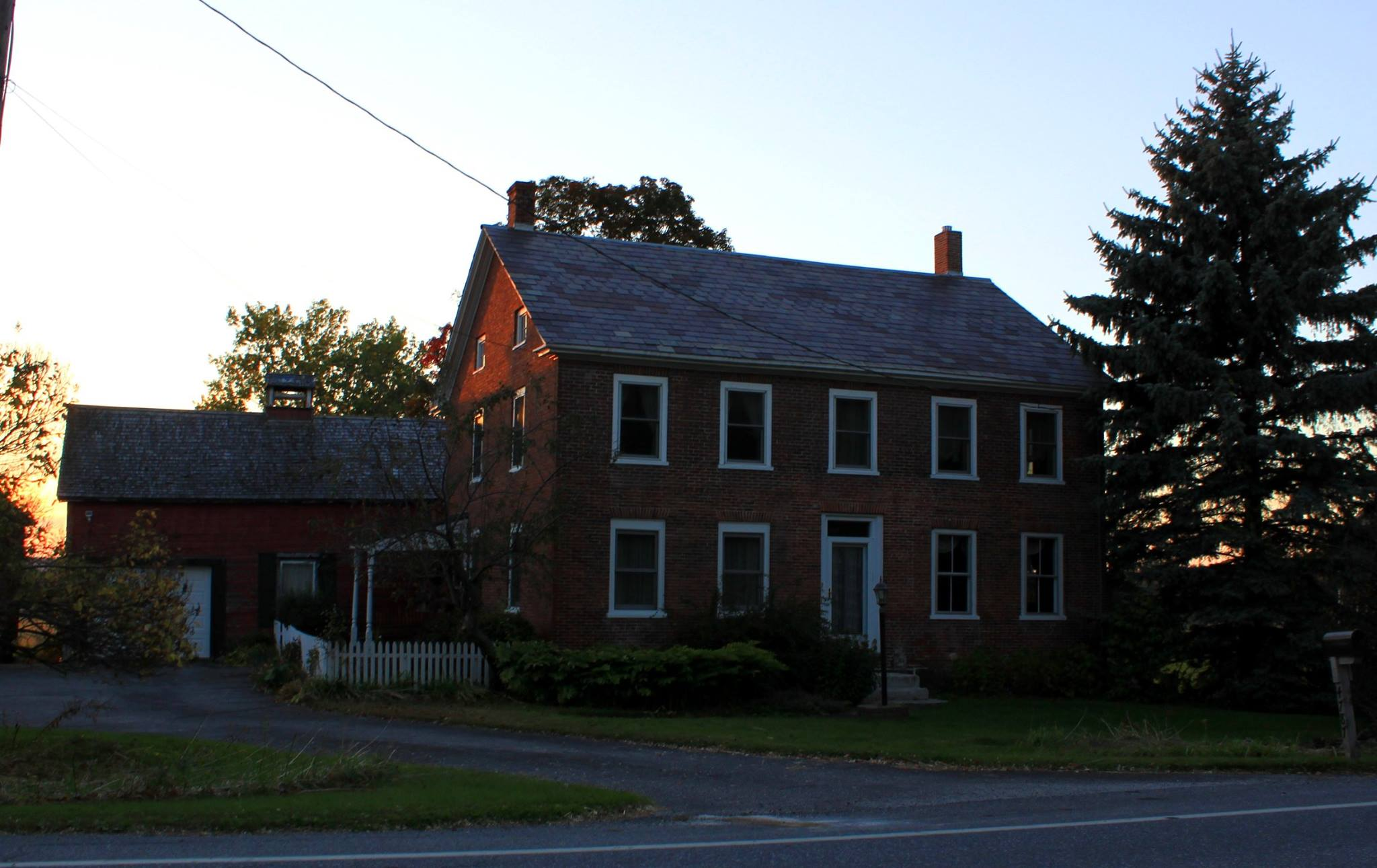

- Location within Vermont Location within the United States
- Location: 4787 Ethan Allen Highway, Georgia, Vermont
- Coordinates: 44°44′30″N 73°6′54″W
- Area: 2.1 acres (0.85 ha)
- Built: 1802
- Architectural style: Federal
- NRHP reference No.: 04000770
- Added to NRHP: July 28, 2004

The Solomon Goodrich Homestead is a historic house at 4787 Ethan Allen Highway (United States Route 7) in Georgia, Vermont. With its oldest section dating to the late 1780s, it is one of the community's oldest surviving buildings. Its later and more prominent brick front is a good early example of Federal period architecture. The house was listed on the National Register of Historic Places in 2004.

== Description and history ==
The Solomon Goodrich Homestead stands in a rural area of central Georgia, on the west side of US 7 north of its junction with Reynolds Road. The homestead consists of two conjoined structures, one brick and the other framed in timber. The main block is a 2 1/2-story brick structure, with a side gable roof and two end chimneys. The main facade is five bays, with a center entrance and windows that are simply framed and topped by brick lintels. Attached to the rear of this block is an older 1 1/2-story wood-frame structure. Its framing consists of ax-hewn timbers.

The house was built by Solomon Goodrich, one of Georgia's early settlers. Its oldest section appears to date to about 1786, not long after Goodrich arrived in the area, and the brick main block was built in the early 19th century, after a brickyard and sawmill had been established in the town. The older portion was thereafter historically used as a summer kitchen, and was probably used in farm-related operations such as the production of butter. The farm property remained in the Goodrich family until 1854, and was for many years owned and operated by the Ballards.

== See also ==
- National Register of Historic Places listings in Franklin County, Vermont
