= District No. 8 School =

- District School No. 8 School
- U.S. National Register of Historic Places
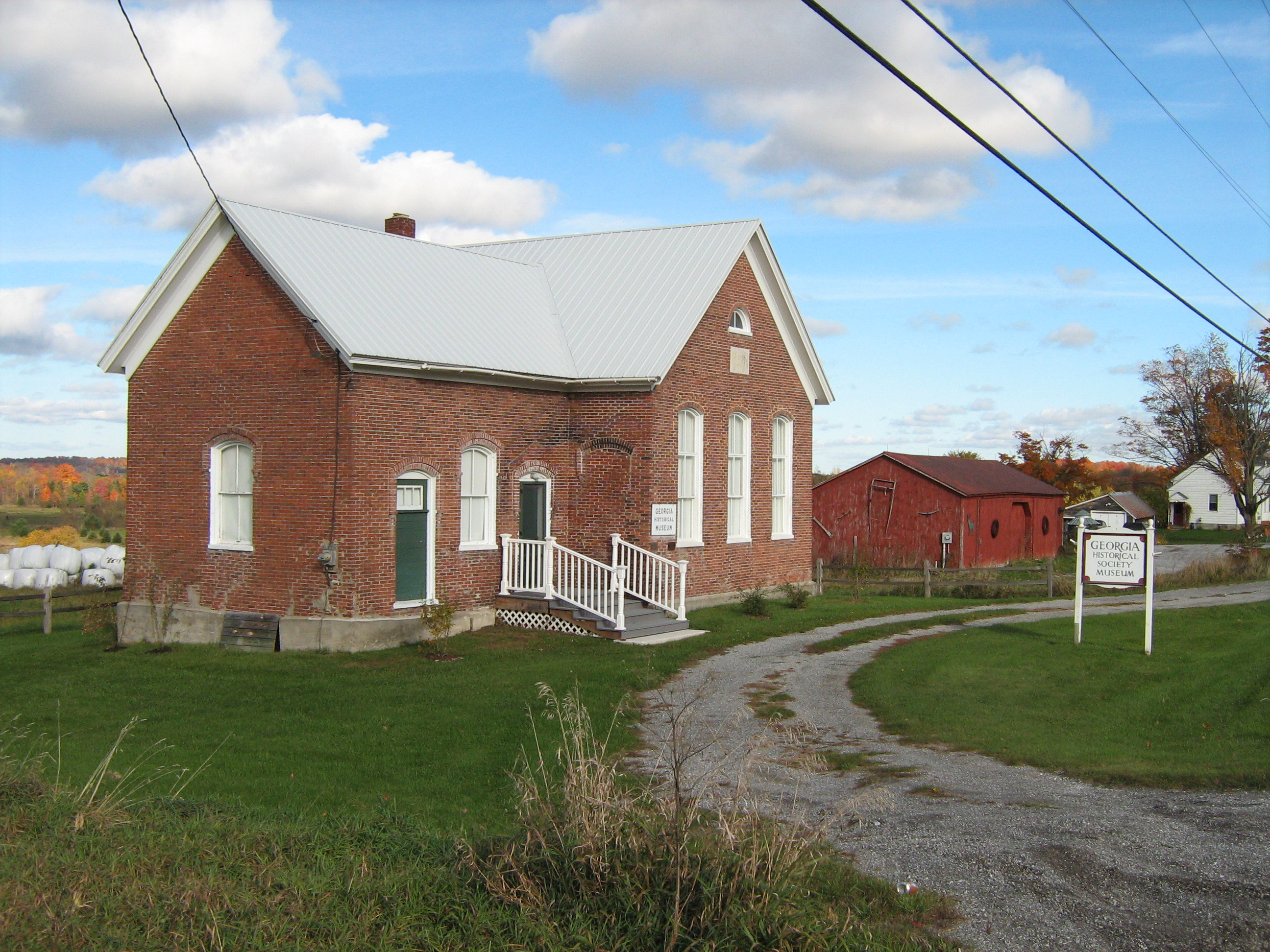

- Location within Vermont Location within the United States
- Location: US 7, Georgia, Vermont
- Coordinates: 44°43′51″N 73°7′4″W
- Area: 0.2 acres (0.081 ha)
- Built: 1891
- Architectural style: Italianate
- MPS: Educational Resources of Vermont MPS
- NRHP reference No.: 98001319
- Added to NRHP: October 30, 1998

The District No. 8 School, also known locally as the Brick School, is a historic school building on United States Route 7 in Georgia, Vermont. Built in 1891, it was one of the last district schools to be built in the state, which mandated town control over schools the following year. It now houses the collection of the Georgia Historical Society and is known as the Brick Schoolhouse Museum. It was listed on the National Register of Historic Places in 1998.

== Description and history ==
The Brick School stands about 0.5 miles (0.80 km) north of the village center of Georgia, on the west side of US 7. It is a single-story brick building in a T shape, with a front-gabled main block from which an ell extends to the left side. The main block is three bays wide, with sash windows set in segmented-arch openings, and a small half-round window in the gable above. The main entrances are in the front of the side ell, on either side of another window, all of which also set in segmented-arch openings. The interior has a single large chamber in the main block, and three small rooms in the ell, one of which historically served as a privy.

The school was built, apparently in stages, in 1891, on the site of a previous school building. There is some architectural evidence that elements of the previous building were reused in its constructions. Alterations were made to the building between 1927 and 1930 by the town to bring the building up to then-current state standards regarding lighting and plumbing. The school was closed in 1940, its students transferred to the Old White Meeting House. It burned down in 1952, at which time this school was reopened, again operating until 1959. The building was rehabilitated in the 1970s for use by the Georgia Historical Society; it continues to be owned by the town.

== See also ==
- National Register of Historic Places listings in Franklin County, Vermont
