= Moses P. Perley House =

Historic house in Vermont, United States

- U.S. National Register of Historic Places
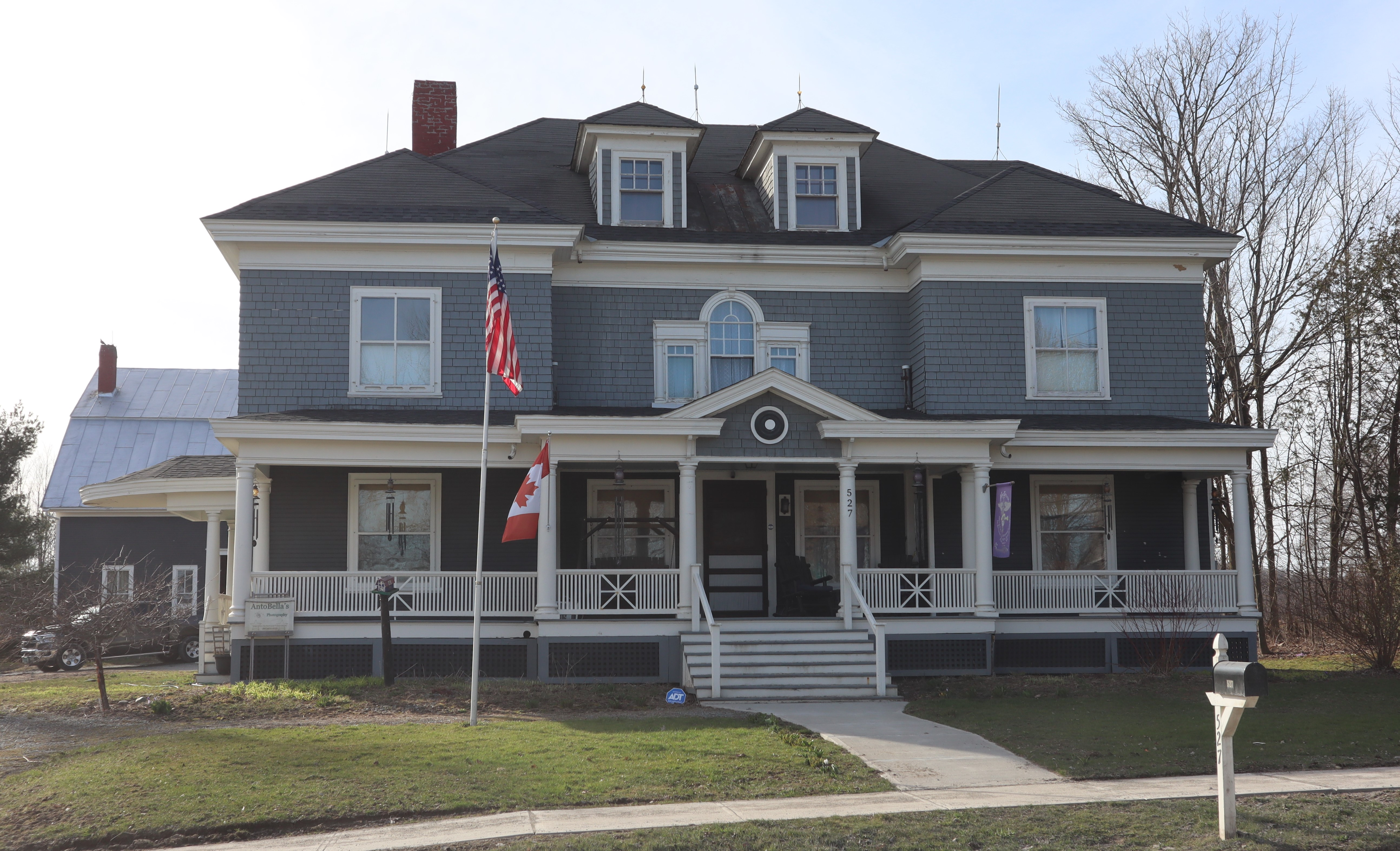
- Perley House in 2024

- Location within Vermont Location within the United States
- Location: 527 Main St., Enosburg Falls, Vermont
- Coordinates: 44°54′35″N 72°48′14″W
- Area: 4.5 acres (1.8 ha)
- Built: 1903
- Architect: Walter R. B. Willcox
- NRHP reference No.: 100005432
- Added to NRHP: August 6, 2020

The Moses P. Perley House is a historic house at 527 Main Street in Enosburg Falls, Vermont, United States. Built in 1903, it is a locally prominent example of the Shingle and Colonial Revival styles of architecture, designed by Burlington architect Walter R. B. Willcox for a local businessman. The house was listed on the National Register of Historic Places in 2020. It is now a bed and breakfast inn.

== Description and history ==
The Moses P. Perley House is located in the northern part of the village of Enosburg Falls, on the west side of Main Street (Vermont Route 108) north of its junction with Orchard Street. It is set on about 4.5 acres (1.8 ha), with a period carriage house behind. It is a 2-1/2 wood-frame structure, its exterior finished in wooden clapboards on the first floor, and wooden shingles on the second. Its massing is divided into a main block and rear ell, with these sections and various porches covered by intersecting hip roofs. The porches are supported by Doric columns, with similar pilasters articulating building corners. The interior retains many original high-style features and finishes.

The house was built in 1903 by local builder Allen Manley to a design by Burlington architect Walter R. B. Willcox. It was built for Moses P. Perley, a prominent local merchant. Perley established a series of general merchandise stores across northern Vermont which was one of the largest such operations in the state by the end of the 19th century. The house remained in the family until 2014, when it was sold, and restored for use as a bed and breakfast inn.

== See also ==
- National Register of Historic Places listings in Franklin County, Vermont
