= National Register of Historic Places listings in Franklin County, Vermont =

Location of Franklin County in Vermont

This is a list of the National Register of Historic Places listings in Franklin County, Vermont.

This is intended to be a complete list of the properties and districts on the National Register of Historic Places in Franklin County, Vermont, United States. Latitude and longitude coordinates are provided for many National Register properties and districts; these locations may be seen together in a map.

There are 65 properties and districts listed on the National Register in the county.

This National Park Service list is complete through NPS recent listings posted June 27, 2025.

Contents: Counties in Vermont
Addison - Bennington - Caledonia - Chittenden - Essex - Franklin - Grand Isle - Lamoille - Orange - Orleans - Rutland - Washington - Windham - Windsor

== Current listings ==
| | Name on the Register | Image | Date listed | Location | City or town | Description |
|---|---|---|---|---|---|---|
| 1 | Ballard Farm | Ballard Farm | November 4, 1993 (#93001241) | Junction of Ballard Rd. and Town Highway 6; 44°42′41″N 73°07′21″W | Georgia | |
| 2 | Billado Block | Billado Block | October 16, 2007 (#07001095) | 371 Main St. 44°54′36″N 72°48′18″W | Enosburgh | |
| 3 | Sheldon Boright House | Sheldon Boright House | June 2, 1989 (#89000433) | 122 River St. 45°00′01″N 72°40′44″W | Richford | |
| 4 | Bridge 9 | Bridge 9 | December 20, 2007 (#07001298) | Shawville Rd. 44°54′42″N 72°58′22″W | Sheldon | |
| 5 | Bridge 12 | Bridge 12 | December 20, 2007 (#07001299) | Boston Post Rd. 44°55′11″N 72°45′26″W | Enosburgh | |
| 6 | Bridge Number VT105-10 | | December 11, 2018 (#100003224) | VT 105 over Missisquoi River; 44°54′06″N 72°57′06″W | Sheldon | |
| 7 | Brigham Academy | Brigham Academy | December 13, 1995 (#95001428) | Junction of VT 108 and Academy Rd. 44°47′12″N 72°48′11″W | Bakersfield | |
| 8 | Central Vermont Railroad Headquarters | Central Vermont Railroad Headquarters | January 21, 1974 (#74000211) | Bounded roughly by Federal, Catherine, Allen, Lower Welden, Houghton, and Pine Sts. 44°48′41″N 73°05′15″W | St. Albans | |
| 9 | Community Baptist Church and Parsonage | | October 13, 2015 (#15000737) | 2 & 10 Mountain Rd. 44°52′38″N 72°36′28″W | Montgomery | |
| 10 | Comstock Covered Bridge | Comstock Covered Bridge | November 19, 1974 (#74000212) | Off VT 118 spanning the Trout River; 44°53′59″N 72°38′39″W | Montgomery | |
| 11 | District No. 2 School | District No. 2 School | February 4, 2000 (#00000063) | 2442 Polly Hubbard Rd. 44°45′22″N 73°09′24″W | Georgia | |
| 12 | District No. 8 School | District No. 8 School | October 30, 1998 (#98001319) | U.S. Route 7; 44°43′51″N 73°07′04″W | Georgia | |
| 13 | Douglas & Jarvis Patent Parabolic Truss Iron Bridge | Douglas & Jarvis Patent Parabolic Truss Iron Bridge | March 21, 1974 (#74000213) | U.S. Route 2 over the Missisquoi River in Highgate Falls; 44°56′03″N 73°02′53″W | Highgate | |
| 14 | Downtown Richford Historic District | Downtown Richford Historic District | August 22, 1980 (#80000333) | Main and River Sts. 44°59′47″N 72°40′19″W | Richford | |
| 15 | East Fairfield Covered Bridge | East Fairfield Covered Bridge | November 19, 1974 (#74000214) | Bridge Street, over Black Creek, near East Fairfield; 44°47′08″N 72°51′49″W | Fairfield | |
| 16 | Enosburg Congregational Memorial Church | Enosburg Congregational Memorial Church | March 2, 2001 (#01000222) | Town Highway 2; 44°52′58″N 72°45′15″W | Enosburgh | |
| 17 | Enosburg Opera House | Enosburg Opera House | September 20, 1978 (#78000235) | 123 Depot St. 44°54′31″N 72°48′08″W | Enosburg Falls | |
| 18 | Evarts-McWilliams House | Evarts-McWilliams House | October 21, 1982 (#82001765) | Georgia Shore Rd. 44°46′56″N 73°08′34″W | Georgia | Now a bed & breakfast inn |
| 19 | Fairfax Covered Bridge | Fairfax Covered Bridge | November 5, 1974 (#74000215) | Off VT 104 over Mill Brook; 44°39′49″N 73°00′39″W | Fairfax | Maple Street Covered Bridge |
| 20 | Fairfield Street School | Fairfield Street School | November 7, 1996 (#96001326) | 78 Fairfield St. 44°48′31″N 73°04′45″W | St. Albans | |
| 21 | First Congregational Church of Swanton | First Congregational Church of Swanton | March 2, 2001 (#01000220) | 42 Academy St. 44°55′02″N 73°07′21″W | Swanton | |
| 22 | Fletcher Union Church | Fletcher Union Church | May 17, 1982 (#82001702) | Town Highway 1 (Cambridge Rd.); 44°40′57″N 72°54′42″W | Fletcher | |
| 23 | Fuller Covered Bridge | Fuller Covered Bridge | December 23, 1974 (#74000216) | Fuller Bridge Rd. over Black Falls Brook at Montgomery Village; 44°54′12″N 72°38′23″W | Montgomery | |
| 24 | Georgia Plain Baptist Church | Georgia Plain Baptist Church | March 2, 2001 (#01000213) | 1493 Stonebridge Rd., at Plains Rd. 44°43′15″N 73°09′57″W | Georgia | |
| 25 | Giroux Furniture Company Building | Giroux Furniture Company Building | November 8, 2006 (#06001010) | 10-18 Catherine St. 44°48′39″N 73°05′10″W | St. Albans | |
| 26 | Solomon Goodrich Homestead | Solomon Goodrich Homestead | July 28, 2004 (#04000770) | 4787 Ethan Allen Highway; 44°44′25″N 73°06′55″W | Georgia | |
| 27 | Hathaway's Tavern | Hathaway's Tavern | July 14, 1983 (#83003209) | 255 N. Main St. 44°49′21″N 73°04′52″W | St. Albans | Franklin County was organized in 1795, but did not have a courthouse until 1803, during which time terms of the court were held at Silas Hathaway's tavern, the oldest house in the city. |
| 28 | Hectorville Covered Bridge | Hectorville Covered Bridge | November 20, 1974 (#74000217) | 1.8 mi (2.9 km) south of Montgomery Center over the South Branch of the Trout River; 44°51′13″N 72°36′50″W | Montgomery | Bridge has been dismantled and is awaiting repairs |
| 29 | Hopkins Covered Bridge | Hopkins Covered Bridge | November 20, 1974 (#74000218) | Town road over the Trout River; 44°55′15″N 72°40′23″W | Enosburgh | |
| 30 | Houghton House | Houghton House | September 4, 1972 (#72000092) | 86 S. Main St. 44°48′27″N 73°05′05″W | St. Albans | |
| 31 | Hutchins Covered Bridge | Hutchins Covered Bridge | December 30, 1974 (#74000219) | South of Montgomery Center over the South Branch of the Trout River; 44°51′30″N 72°36′45″W | Montgomery | |
| 32 | Kemp-Shepard House | | November 13, 1997 (#97001442) | VT 104A, 1 mi (1.6 km) southeast of U.S. Route 7; 44°40′56″N 73°05′24″W | Georgia | |
| 33 | Dr. B. J. Kendall Company | Dr. B. J. Kendall Company | August 2, 1993 (#93000721) | 228 N. Main St. 44°54′40″N 72°48′12″W | Enosburgh | |
| 34 | L'Ecole Saintes-Anges | L'Ecole Saintes-Anges | November 28, 1980 (#80000334) | 247 Lake St. 44°48′42″N 73°05′40″W | St. Albans | |
| 35 | Longley Covered Bridge | Longley Covered Bridge | December 30, 1974 (#74000220) | Northwest of Montgomery over the Trout River; 44°54′25″N 72°39′21″W | Montgomery | |
| 36 | Methodist Episcopal Church | Methodist Episcopal Church | March 2, 2001 (#01000219) | 25 Grand Ave. 44°55′07″N 73°07′30″W | Swanton | |
| 37 | Missisquoi River Bridge | Missisquoi River Bridge | October 11, 1990 (#90001494) | VT 105-A over the Missisquoi River; 45°00′49″N 72°35′16″W | Richford | |
| 38 | Montgomery House | Montgomery House | August 20, 1992 (#92000997) | VT 118; 44°54′05″N 72°38′27″W | Montgomery | |
| 39 | H.H. Mower General Store | | March 24, 2025 (#100011563) | 200 Bridge Street; 44°52′54″N 72°56′32″W | Sheldon | Now home to the Sheldon Historical Society & Museum. |
| 40 | Ovitt Grist Mill | Ovitt Grist Mill | September 17, 2021 (#100007004) | 1796 Tyler Branch Rd. 44°52′17″N 72°47′49″W | Enosburgh | |
| 41 | Parish of the Holy Trinity | Parish of the Holy Trinity | March 2, 2001 (#01000221) | 38 Grand Ave. 44°55′02″N 73°07′25″W | Swanton | |
| 42 | Perley Block | | December 6, 2021 (#100007221) | 366 Main St. 44°54′28″N 72°48′17″W | Enosburg Falls | |
| 43 | Moses P. Perley House | Moses P. Perley House | August 6, 2020 (#100005432) | 527 Main St. 44°54′35″N 72°48′14″W | Enosburg Falls | |
| 44 | Quincy Hotel | Quincy Hotel | February 4, 2019 (#100003415) | 57 Depot St. 44°54′30″N 72°48′12″W | Enosburgh | |
| 45 | Richford Primary School | Richford Primary School | May 12, 2004 (#04000443) | 140 Intervale Ave. 44°59′47″N 72°40′31″W | Richford | |
| 46 | Richwood Estate | Richwood Estate | November 3, 1988 (#88002175) | North of St. Albans off U.S. Route 7; 44°51′48″N 73°05′48″W | Swanton | Listed as being in the St. Albans vicinity. |
| 47 | Rockledge | Rockledge | May 19, 1994 (#94000474) | Highgate Rd. (Vermont Route 207); 44°52′25″N 73°04′27″W | Swanton | |
| 48 | St. Albans Historic District | St. Albans Historic District | May 1, 1980 (#80000335) | U.S. Route 7 and VT 36; also all or parts of: Academy Dr, Bank, Catherine, Center, Church, Congress, Fairfield, Federal, Kingman, Lake, North Main, and South Main Sts., Lincoln Ave., Hampton and Maiden Lns. 44°48′43″N 73°05′00″W | St. Albans | Second set of addresses represent a boundary increase approved March 17, 2023. |
| 49 | St. Albans Town Hall | St. Albans Town Hall | March 14, 1996 (#96000257) | VT 36 (Lake Rd.); 44°48′30″N 73°08′20″W | St. Albans | |
| 50 | St. Ann's Episcopal Church | St. Ann's Episcopal Church | March 12, 2001 (#01000259) | Junction of Church and Town Sts. 44°59′52″N 72°40′20″W | Richford | |
| 51 | St. Bartholomew's Episcopal Church | St. Bartholomew's Episcopal Church | September 1, 1988 (#88001467) | VT 118; 44°54′06″N 72°38′26″W | Montgomery | Now known as Pratt Hall. |
| 52 | St. George's Catholic Church | St. George's Catholic Church | March 2, 2001 (#01000218) | VT 25; 44°46′53″N 72°48′02″W | Bakersfield | |
| 53 | St. John's Episcopal Church | St. John's Episcopal Church | September 3, 1976 (#76000139) | Highgate Falls village green 44°55′48″N 73°02′56″W | Highgate | |
| 54 | Swanton Covered Railroad Bridge | Swanton Covered Railroad Bridge | June 18, 1973 (#73000195) | South of Swanton over the Missisquoi River; 44°54′58″N 73°07′40″W | Swanton | Destroyed in 1987 |
| 55 | Swanton School | Swanton School | March 1, 2002 (#02000118) | 53 Church St. 44°54′58″N 73°07′26″W | Swanton | |
| 56 | Sweat-Comings Company House | Sweat-Comings Company House | May 12, 2004 (#04000444) | 10-12 Powell St. 44°59′46″N 72°40′27″W | Richford | |
| 57 | U.S. Inspection Station-East Richford, Vermont | U.S. Inspection Station-East Richford, Vermont | September 10, 2014 (#14000604) | 357 Glen Sutton Rd. 45°00′40″N 72°35′16″W | Richford | Listed on the register as "U.S. Inspection Station-East Rockford, Vermont". |
| 58 | U.S. Inspection Station-Richford, Vermont | U.S. Inspection Station-Richford, Vermont | September 10, 2014 (#14000605) | VT 139; 45°00′49″N 72°39′46″W | Richford | |
| 59 | U.S. Inspection Station-West Berkshire, Vermont | U.S. Inspection Station-West Berkshire, Vermont | September 10, 2014 (#14000606) | VT 108; 45°00′55″N 72°49′33″W | Berkshire | |
| 60 | United States Post Office and Custom House | United States Post Office and Custom House | March 27, 2017 (#100000817) | 40 S. Main St. 44°48′33″N 73°05′02″W | St. Albans | |
| 61 | Warner Home | Warner Home | October 20, 1988 (#88002034) | 133 High St. 44°49′05″N 73°04′36″W | St. Albans | |
| 62 | West Berkshire School | West Berkshire School | November 4, 1993 (#93001174) | Junction of Town Highways 3 and 26; 44°59′10″N 72°48′36″W | Berkshire | |
| 63 | West Hill Covered Bridge | West Hill Covered Bridge | December 31, 1974 (#74000221) | 3.2 miles (5.1 km) south of Montgomery over West Hill Brook; 44°52′03″N 72°38′53″W | Montgomery | Restored in 2009 |
| 64 | F.W. Wheeler House | F.W. Wheeler House | May 12, 2004 (#04000445) | 31 Intervale Ave. 44°59′37″N 72°40′31″W | Richford | |
| 65 | Willard Manufacturing Company Building | Willard Manufacturing Company Building | December 6, 2006 (#06001116) | 25 Stowell St. 44°48′31″N 73°05′11″W | St. Albans | |

== See also ==
- List of National Historic Landmarks in Vermont
- National Register of Historic Places listings in Vermont
