= Ballard Farm =

- U.S. National Register of Historic Places
- U.S. Historic district
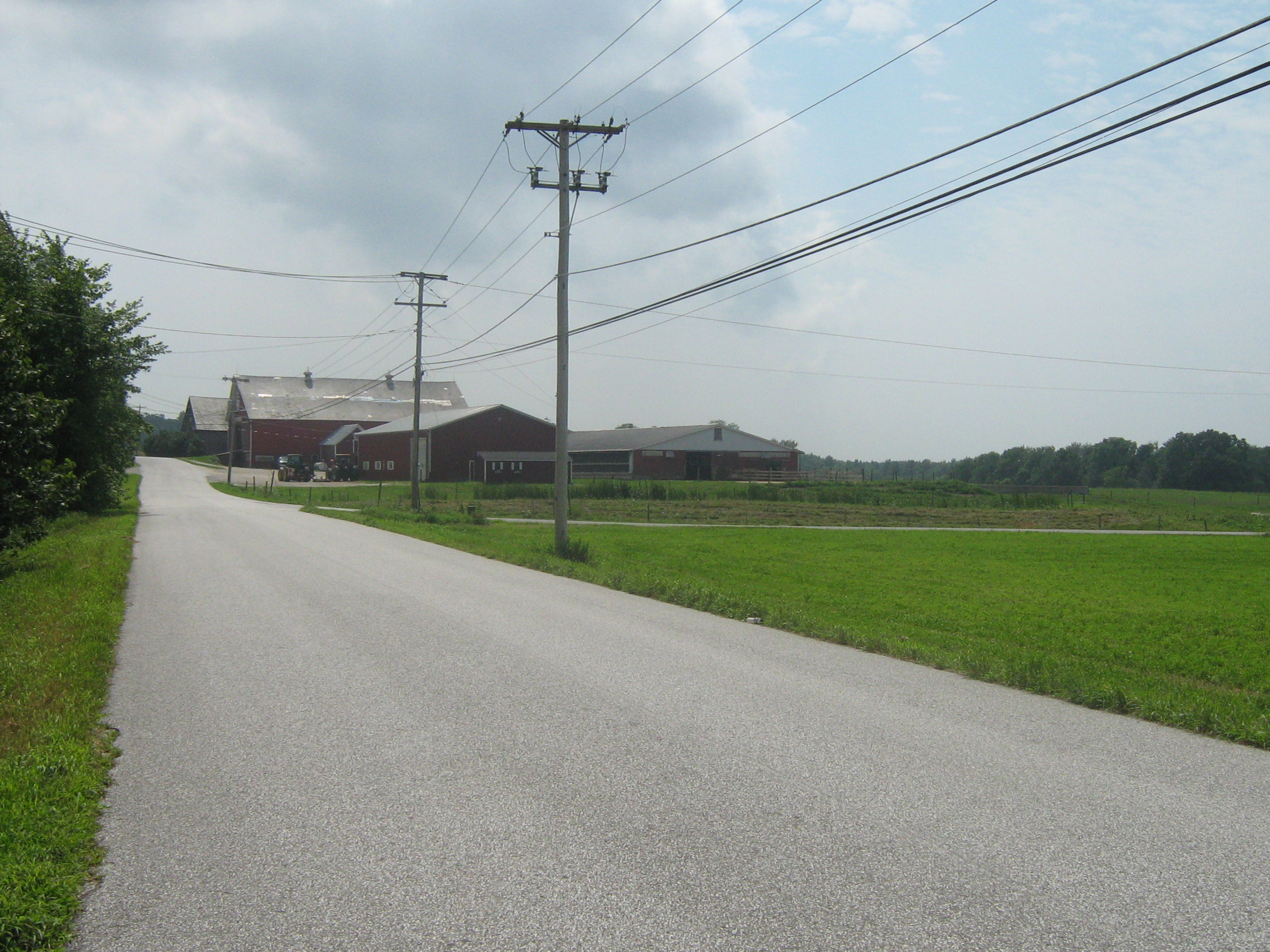

- Location within Vermont Location within the United States
- Location: Jct. of Ballard Rd. and Town Hwy. 6, Georgia, Vermont
- Coordinates: 44°42′41″N 73°7′21″W
- Area: 100 acres (40 ha)
- Built: 1788
- Architectural style: Greek Revival
- MPS: Agricultural Resources of Vermont MPS
- NRHP reference No.: 93001241
- Added to NRHP: November 4, 1993

The Ballard Farm is a historic farm property on Ballard Road in Georgia, Vermont. At the time of its listing on the National Register of Historic Places in 1993, it had been under cultivation by members of the Ballard family for more than 200 years, having been established in 1788 by a sale from Ira Allen to Joseph Ballard.

== Description and history ==
The Ballard Farm stands in a rural area of central southern Georgia, on more than 600 acres (240 ha) of land on Ballard Road near Town Highway 6 (Decker Road). The historic core of the farm is a 100-acre (40 ha) parcel located mostly west of Ballard Road and south of Decker Road. The property has about 15 acres (6.1 ha) each of pasture and cropland, with the balance, the westernmost portion, in steeply sloped woodlands. The farmstead consists of a cluster of buildings on either side of Ballard Road just south of the junction. The farmhouse is set on the east side of the road facing west, and is a 2 1/2-story brick I-house with Greek Revival features. Doors and windows are set in openings with marble sills and lintels. The main entrance is flanked by sidelight windows and topped by a transom window with X-shaped dividers. A wood-frame ell, like the main block topped by a gable roof, extends to the rear. Across the street from the house stand two late 19th-century barns, along with an array of other mostly 20th-century buildings. The oldest outbuilding, now serving as a garage, was built about 1800 as an icehouse.

Joseph Ballard was one of the first settlers of Georgia, purchasing the original 100-acre parcel from Ira Allen, the first white owner of the land, in 1788. Ballard purchased a single acre to the east (across what is now Ballard Road) where he built his first house. The wood-frame ell of the present brick house contains within it the elements of a house built about 1800. Now mainly a dairy operation, use of the farm by various generations of Ballards followed common trends in Vermont agriculture, beginning with generalized use, and eventually transitioning to sheep farming before turning to dairy farming. The family's success is reflective in the regular acquisition of land over time.

== See also ==
- National Register of Historic Places listings in Franklin County, Vermont
