= St. Albans Historic District =

Historic district in Vermont, United States

- U.S. National Register of Historic Places
- U.S. Historic district
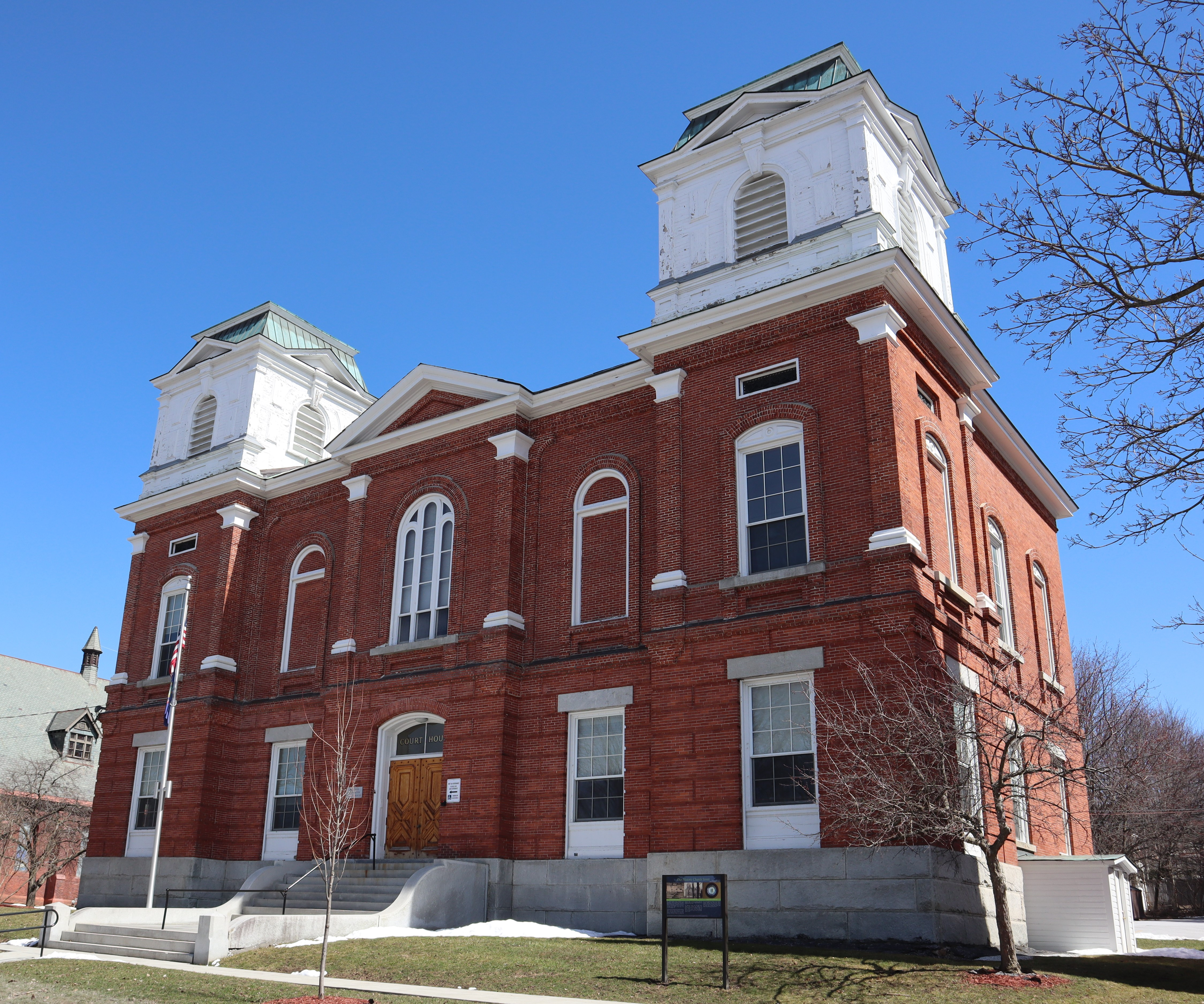
- Church Street Court House in the St. Albans Historic District

- Location within Vermont Location within the United States
- Location: U.S. 7 and VT 36, St. Albans, Vermont
- Coordinates: 44°48′43″N 73°5′0″W
- Area: 35 acres (14 ha)
- Architectural style: Greek Revival, Romanesque, Queen Anne
- NRHP reference No.: 80000335 (original); 100008758 (increase)

Significant dates
- Added to NRHP: May 1, 1980
- Boundary increase: March 17, 2023

The St. Albans Historic District encompasses most of the historic commercial core of the city of St. Albans, Vermont. The district includes the historic town common (Taylor Park), which acts as its focal center, and commercial and civic architecture dating from the early 19th to early 20th centuries. The district was listed on the National Register of Historic Places in 1980.

== Description and history ==
The town of St. Albans was chartered in 1763, but significant settlement in the town did not begin until after the American Revolutionary War. The town common, now Taylor Park, was laid out in 1792, and the major stagecoach route between Burlington and Montreal, now roughly United States Route 7, was laid out by Ira Allen to pass on its west side. The town saw prosperity in the early 19th century as the county seat of Franklin County, and gained a major boost to its economy by the location there of major railroad services of the Central Vermont Railroad, including its headquarters and a major service yard. The architecture of downtown St. Albans is colored by several fires which swept through different parts of the area in the second half of the 19th century, resulting in several different periods and styles of architecture. The city and town of St. Albans were formally separated in 1902, the city encompassing the area that had traditionally been associated with the town's principal village.

The historic district covers about 35 acres (14 ha) of downtown St. Albans. The focal point is Taylor Park, a rectangular greenspace bounded by streets with public and commercial buildings on the opposite side. It extends on the west side of North Main Street (US 7) as far north as Hoyt Street and south to Stebbins Street. It also includes buildings on the adjacent blocks between North Main and Federal Street. North and east of Taylor Park, it extends to Congress Street in the north and Fairfield Street in the south. In addition to commercial buildings, the district includes city hall, several churches, and the Franklin County Courthouse.

== See also ==
- National Register of Historic Places listings in Franklin County, Vermont
