= Perley Block =

- U.S. National Register of Historic Places
- Location within Vermont Location within the United States
- Location: 366 Main St., Enosburg Falls, Vermont
- Coordinates: 44°54′28″N 72°48′17″W
- Area: less than one acre
- Built: 1908
- Architectural style: Renaissance Revival
- NRHP reference No.: 100007221
- Added to NRHP: December 6, 2021

The Perley Block is a historic commercial building at 366 Main Street in the Enosburg Falls village of Enosburgh, Vermont. Built in 1908 in the Renaissance Revival style, its ground-floor facade was given a Modernist update c. 1960. It was listed on the National Register of Historic Places in 2021 for its architecture.

== Description and history ==
The Perley Block stands in the village center of Enosburg Falls, on the east side of Main Street (Vermont Route 180N) north of the village square. It is a 2 1/2-story masonry structure, with a steel frame and exterior principally finished in brick. Its main facade exhibits the original Renaissance Revival styling of the building on its second story, with groups of sash windows set between banded pilasters and topped by rounded blind arches. The ground floor has a distinctly Modernist appearance, with banded aluminum siding framing groups of aluminum-framed glass display windows. There are two recessed entries to the commercial spaces.

The Perley Block was built in 1908 for Moses Perley, owner of a local mercantile shop whose premises had been destroyed by fire. It was designed by Burlington architect Charles Crandall, and opened in early 1909, housing Perley's shop, a drugstore, and a men's clothing store. The upper floor of the building housed apartments, offices, and a small performance and meeting space. In 1955, the building was purchased by Pearl's Department Stores, a regional chain which eventually took over the entire ground floor and gave the building its Modernist appearance. Their store was an anchor of the village's retail business until its closure in 1988.

== See also ==
- National Register of Historic Places listings in Franklin County, Vermont
