= United States Post Office and Custom House (St. Albans, Vermont) =

- U.S. National Register of Historic Places
- "Haying" mural inside the post office

- Location within Vermont Location within the United States
- Location: 40 S. Main St., St. Albans, Vermont
- Coordinates: 44°48′34″N 73°6′2″W
- Area: less than one acre
- Built: 1938
- Architect: Lorimer Rich
- Architectural style: Georgian Revival
- NRHP reference No.: 100000817
- Added to NRHP: March 27, 2017

The United States Post Office and Custom House is a historic government building at 50 South Main Street in the city of St. Albans, Vermont. Built in 1938, and still in use housing federal offices, it is an enduring presence of the federal government in the city. The building was listed on the National Register of Historic Places in 2017.

== Description and history ==
The former United States Post Office and Custom House building is located at the southern end of downtown St. Albans, on the west side of South Main Street at its junction with Stebbins Street. It is a two-story L-shaped brick building with Colonial Revival styling. The main facade is nine bays wide, with a three-bay entrance area recessed behind a three-arch loggia. A narrow metal balcony runs above this loggia, with tall doubled windows above each arch. A band of Vermont marble runs below the eave, incised with the building identification. The former post office lobby space is adorned with murals painted by artist Philip von Saltza.

The building was constructed for the federal government in 1938 as part of a New Deal-era jobs program. It was designed by Lorimer Rich, a private architect, working in conjunction with Louis Simon, the supervising architect of the United States Department of the Treasury, and was located along United States Route 7, long a major north–south route to Canada. Increased road development and automotive traffic prompted the government to expand both the number of border stations and customs facilities in the region. Customs offices were moved out of the building in the 1960s, and the post office was enlarged by an addition in 1967–68. The post office moved out in 2008; the building continues to house other federal government offices.

== See also ==
- National Register of Historic Places listings in Franklin County, Vermont
