= Bridge Number VT105-10 =

- U.S. National Register of Historic Places
- Location within Vermont Location within the United States
- Location: VT 105 over Missisquoi River, Sheldon, Vermont
- Coordinates: 44°54′6″N 72°57′6″W
- Area: less than one acre
- Built: 1947
- Built by: Marston Construction Co.
- Architectural style: Steel girder
- MPS: Metal Truss, Masonry, and Concrete Bridges in Vermont MPS
- NRHP reference No.: 100003224
- Added to NRHP: December 20, 2007

Bridge Number VT105-10 is a historic bridge, carrying Vermont Route 105 across the Missisquoi River in Sheldon, Vermont. Built in 1947 and rehabilitated in 1980, it is the state's oldest surviving four-span girder bridge. It was listed on the National Register of Historic Places in 2018.

== Description and history ==
Bridge Number VT105-10 is located just west of the village of Sheldon Junction, which occupies a bend on the north side of Missisquoi River in central western Sheldon. Vermont Route 105, a major roadway that roughly parallels the river in this area, crosses the river in a roughly northeast–southwest orientation. The bridge consists of four spans, mounted on concrete abutments and three concrete piers. The two center spans are each 175 feet (53 m), while the approach spans are each 125 feet (38 m), giving the bridge a total length of just over 600 feet (180 m). Steel stringers support beams on which the concrete bridge deck is laid.

The bridge was built in 1947, as part of a program by the state to improve deficient pre-World War II structures. It is the fourth road bridge to be located in roughly this location: the first was probably a wooden structure, replaced in 1887 by an iron bridge that was washed away in the state's 1927 floods. The 1927 replace was also a steel girder bridge, but it was plagued by flooding caused by ice jams which formed between it and the nearby Central Vermont Railroad bridge. It was built by the Marston Construction Company of Somerville, Massachusetts, and was the longest steel girder bridge in the state until 1960.

== See also ==
- National Register of Historic Places listings in Franklin County, Vermont
- List of bridges on the National Register of Historic Places in Vermont
