= Willard Manufacturing Company Building =

- U.S. National Register of Historic Places
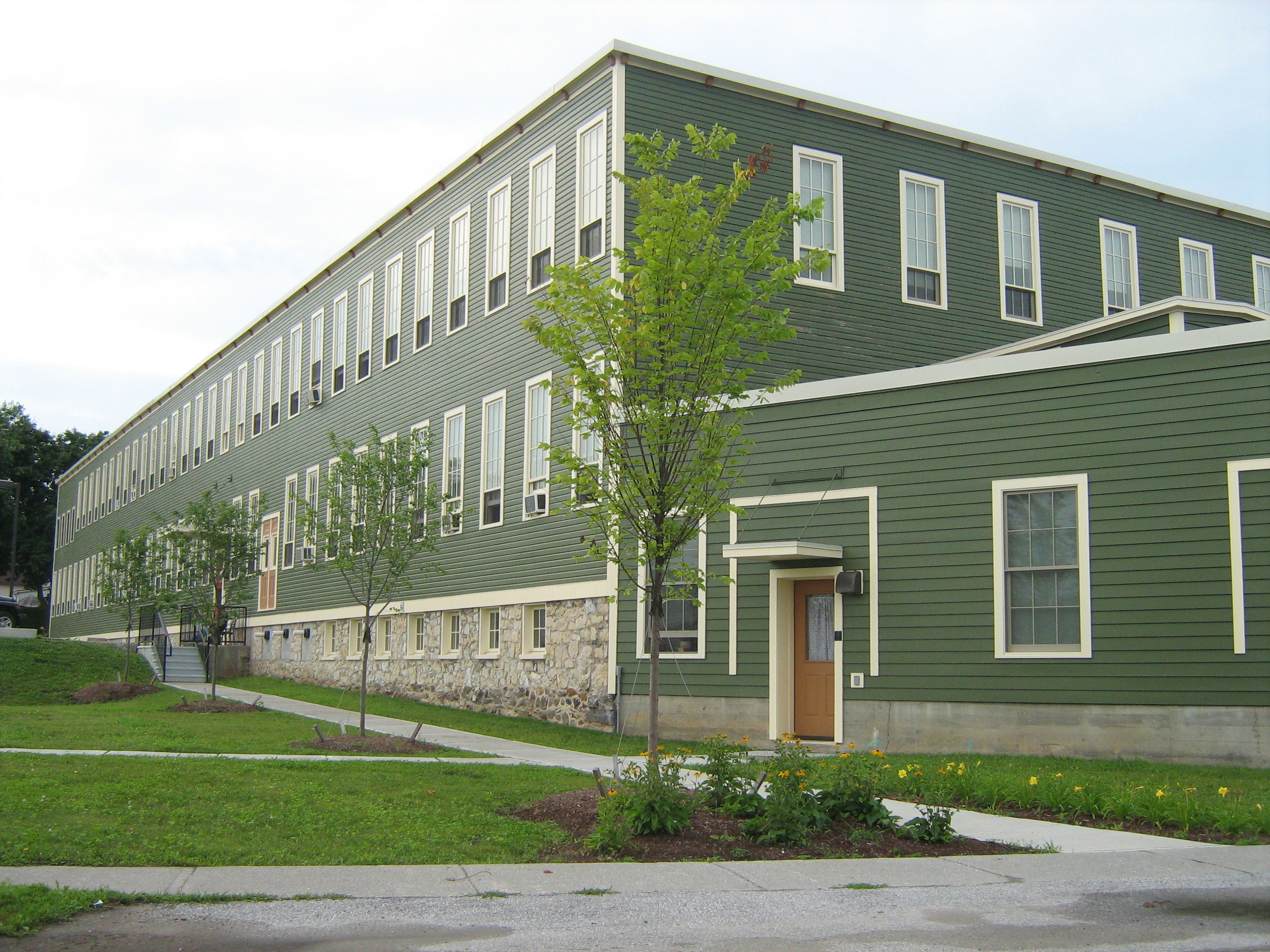

- Location within Vermont Location within the United States
- Location: 25 Stowell St., St. Albans, Vermont
- Coordinates: 44°48′38″N 73°5′11″W
- Area: less than one acre
- Built: 1896
- Architectural style: Italianate
- NRHP reference No.: 06001116
- Added to NRHP: December 6, 2006

The Willard Manufacturing Company Building is a historic factory building at 25 Stowell Street in the city of St. Albans, Vermont. Built in 1896, the building saw industrial uses continuously until 2006, retaining many original early period features. It was listed on the National Register of Historic Places in 2006.

== Description and history ==
The Willard Manufacturing Company is located in the industrial areas of St. Albans that flank the tracks of the Central Vermont Railroad. It is set on the north side of Stowell Street, at its junction with Allen Street, which runs north–south along the tracks. It is a flat-roofed two-story wood-frame building, extending for about 200 feet (61 m) along Stowell Street. It is set on a limestone foundation, and its roof has a slightly projecting cornice with occasional exposed rafter ends. Windows are tall and rectangular, with fixed upper portions and a short bottom sash. A single-story addition extends westward from the main block, with garage bay openings facing Allen Street. The interior has a lobby at the eastern end, and a largely open factory space on the balance of the ground floor, with offices and a showroom on the east end of the upper level.

The Willard Manufacturing Company was founded in 1886 by Rodney S. Willard, a prominent local garment manufacturer, by merging two businesses in which he was a partner. The business first produced overalls and frocks, but expanded to produce undergarments, hosiery, and swimwear. This factory was built in 1896 on land acquired from W. Beecher Fonda, a company board member who owned the adjacent lumber yard. The city had in 1895 suffered a devastating fire in its downtown area, and this factory was built using the latest in fire resistance and suppression methods. The Willard Company operated into the early 1940s, producing military uniforms during World War II. Its building was acquired in 1942 by the George H. Soule Company, makers of maple syrup evaporators. The Soule Company was responsible for partition some of the factory space for offices and other uses, and the addition of the garage to the west end. It was later owned by the Leader Evaporator Company, which moved to a modern plant in 2006. The building was later converted to apartments.

== See also ==
- National Register of Historic Places listings in Franklin County, Vermont

== See also ==
- Willard Mill Housing
