= Community Baptist Church and Parsonage =

Historic church in Vermont, United States

- U.S. National Register of Historic Places
- Location within Vermont Location within the United States
- Location: 2 and 10 Mountain Rd., Montgomery, Vermont
- Coordinates: 44°52′38″N 72°36′28″W
- Area: 4.7 acres (1.9 ha)
- Built: 1866
- Architectural style: Greek Revival; Colonial Revival
- NRHP reference No.: 15000737
- Added to NRHP: October 13, 2015

The Community Baptist Church and Parsonage are a historic church property at 2 and 10 Mountain Road in the center of Montgomery, Vermont. The church, built in 1866, is a prominently placed example of Greek Revival architecture, while the adjacent parsonage house is a well-preserved example of the Colonial Revival. The church was for many years a center of social activities in the town, prior to its closure in 2011. It was listed on the National Register of Historic Places in 2015.

== Architecture and history ==
The Community Baptist Church stands at the very center of Montgomery's main village on the east side of the triangular junction of Vermont Route 118 and Vermont Route 242 (Mountain Road), just north of the Trout River. It is a two-story wood-frame structure, with a gabled roof, clapboarded exterior, and fieldstone foundation. The west-facing front facade is distinguished by a tall Greek Revival temple portico, with four paneled square Doric columns supporting an entablature and plain gabled pediment. A two-stage square tower rises from the roofline, with corner pilasters on both stages, and louvered openings on the second belfry stage. Two entrances flank a central rectangular stained glass window on the main facade. The 1 1/2-story Colonial Revival parsonage stands just north of the church.

Montgomery's Baptist congregation was first organized in 1820, with ten people, and was the community's third Christian denomination. Divided by Millerism, this congregation disbanded about 1843, and a new one was organized in 1846. These organizations met in a variety of spaces until this church was built in 1866. A carriage barn (now demolished) was added behind the church in 1873, and the house next door was acquired as a parsonage. The present parsonage house was built on the foundation of the older one in 1922, the same year the Baptists merged with the Congregationalists. The church has long been a focal point of townwide activities, including the hosting of social events such as suppers, and organizations like the Boy Scouts. The Baptist congregation finally disbanded in 2011 due to its small size, and the building has been taken over by a local community group.

== See also ==
- National Register of Historic Places listings in Franklin County, Vermont
