= Giroux Furniture Company Building =

- U.S. National Register of Historic Places
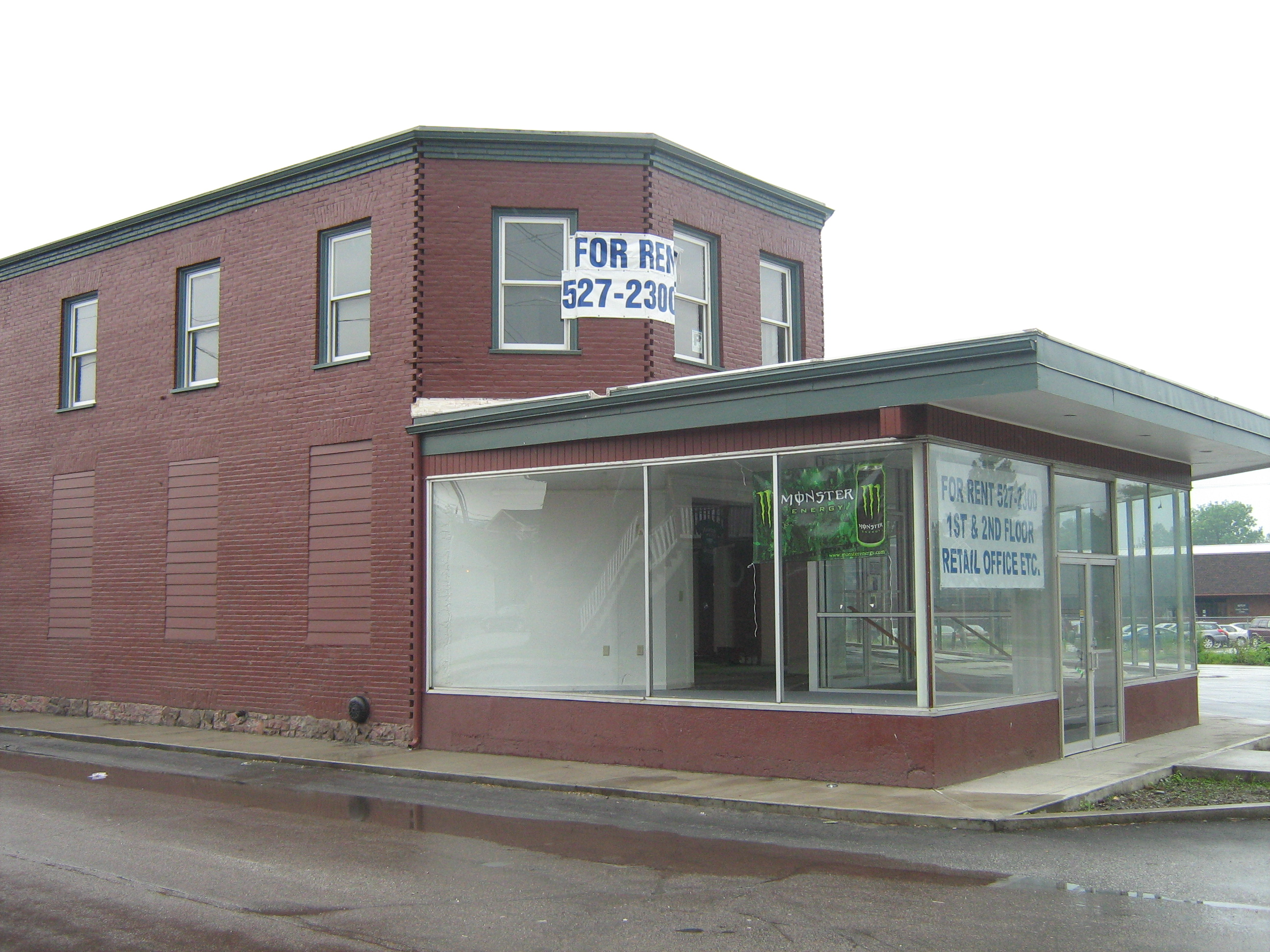

- Location within Vermont Location within the United States
- Location: 10-18 Catherine St., St. Albans, Vermont
- Coordinates: 44°48′39″N 73°5′10″W
- Area: less than one acre
- Built: 1896
- Architectural style: Early Commercial
- NRHP reference No.: 06001010
- Added to NRHP: November 8, 2006

The Giroux Furniture Company Building is a historic commercial building at 10-18 Catherine Street in the city of St. Albans, Vermont. Built in two parts (1896 and 1905), it is a reminder of the city's railroad-related history, and served for many years as an enduring commercial presence. It was listed on the National Register of Historic Places in 2006.

== Description and history ==
The former Giroux Furniture Company Building is located in central St. Albans, on a block bounded by Market, Lake, and Catherine Streets. It is set directly Lake Street from the Central Vermont Railway Office building, and across Market Street from the main railroad tracks. The front portion of the building is triangular in shape, an artifact of the historic alignment of Market Street, which angled toward Federal Street east of the railway office. It is two stories in height, built out of wood frame faced in brick veneer. A single-story showroom facade is built along the angled side of the building. To the rear of the triangular section is a large two-story warehouse of similar construction.

The rear warehouse portion of the building was built in 1896 by Hiram Weeks, who operated a feed store. He chose the location to efficiently move large volumes of goods from the railroad tracks to the west into the building, and then move smaller (but still large) quantities of goods to his customers on the east side. The feed business, eventually renamed or sold to City Feed Company, remained on the premises until 1936, adding the front triangular section in 1905. This addition was made to provide space for a vehicle repair business operated by Frederick Bedard and Henry Carlisle. In 1937 the building was acquired by the Giroux brothers, who opened what they claimed was Vermont's largest furniture retailer, also capitalizing on the presence of the nearby railroad for delivery of their goods. The Giroux Furniture Company closed in the 2000s, after nearly 70 years of operation.

== See also ==
- National Register of Historic Places listings in Franklin County, Vermont
