= L'Ecole Saintes-Anges =

- U.S. National Register of Historic Places
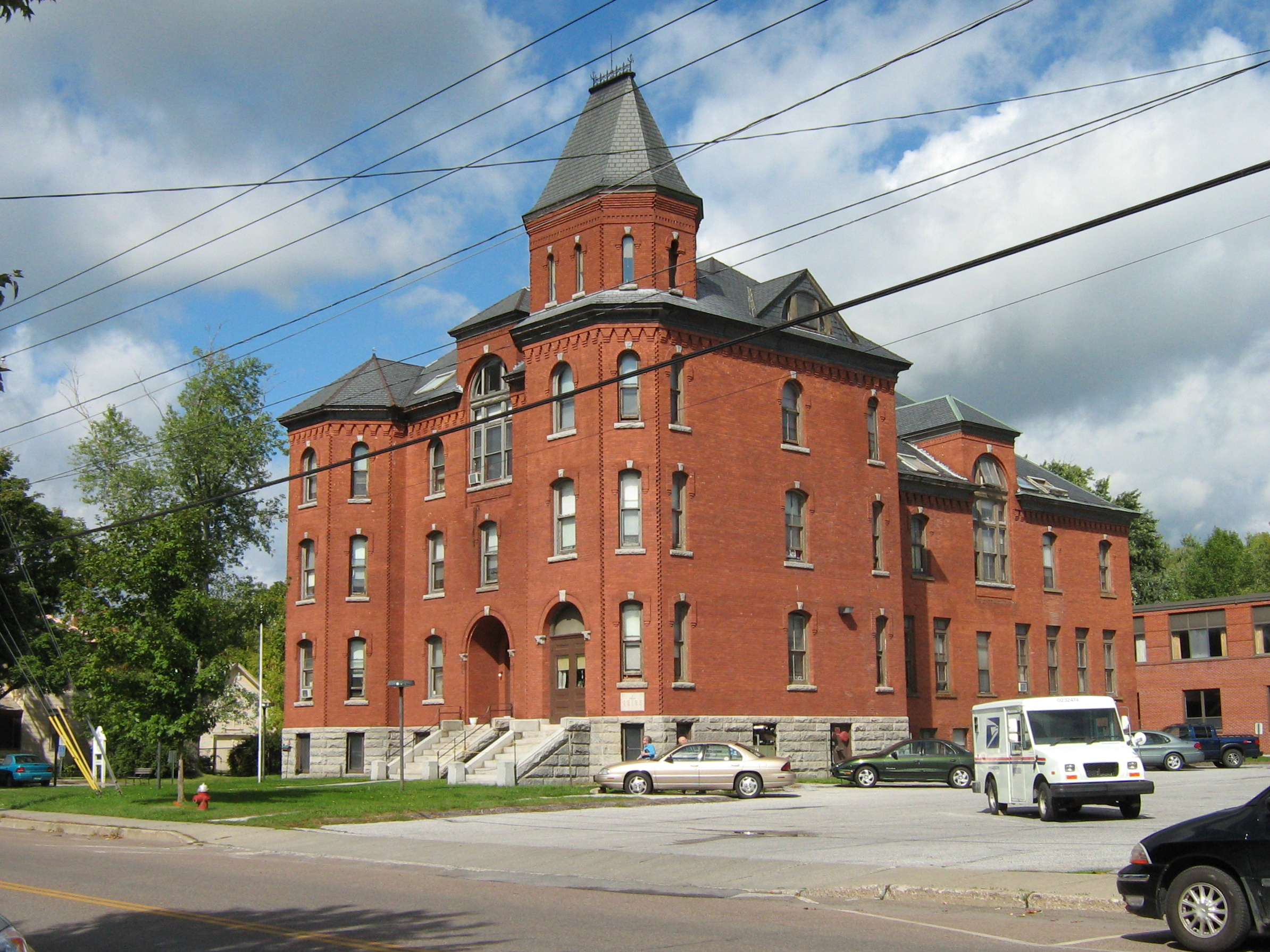

- Location within Vermont Location within the United States
- Location: 247 Lake St., St. Albans, Vermont
- Coordinates: 44°48′42″N 73°5′40″W
- Area: 1 acre (0.40 ha)
- Built: 1899
- Architectural style: Romanesque
- NRHP reference No.: 80000334
- Added to NRHP: November 28, 1980

The L'Ecole Saintes-Anges, or the Holy Angels Convent in English, is a historic religious and educational building at 247 Lake Street in the city of St. Albans, Vermont. Built in 1899, it is a prominent local example of Romanesque Revival architecture, and served historically as a significant cultural center for the local French Canadian immigrant population. It was listed on the National Register of Historic Places in 1980. The building has been readapted for residential use.

== Description and history ==
The former Holy Angels Convent stands a few blocks west of downtown St. Albans, on the north side of Lake Street (Vermont Route 36) opposited its junction with Edward Street, and across a parking lot with the Holy Angels Catholic Church. It is a three-story brick building, covered by a hip roof and set on a raised foundation of rusticated granite blocks. The main facade has projecting full-height bays flanking a central section with a recessed entrance. The right bay is topped by a tower capped by a steep hip roof with iron cresting. Windows are set in segmented-arch openings on the first two floors, and round-arch openings on the third, with stone keystones and sills. The eave features decorative brick corbelling.

St. Albans, located just 15 miles (24 km) from the Canada–United States border, has a long history of immigration from adjacent Quebec. By the 1850s its French-speaking population had grown to the point where the local Roman Catholic diocese established the Holy Angels Convent a few blocks north of the present site. The nuns taught classes in French to the local population in a bid to maintain their French language and culture. By the 1890s that space was outgrown, and the present building was constructed in 1899. It was for 75 years an educational and social center for the surrounding neighborhood, which still has many residents of French Canadian descent. The building has since been converted into residential units.

== See also ==
- National Register of Historic Places listings in Franklin County, Vermont
