= Houghton House (St. Albans, Vermont) =

Historic house in Vermont, United States

- U.S. National Register of Historic Places
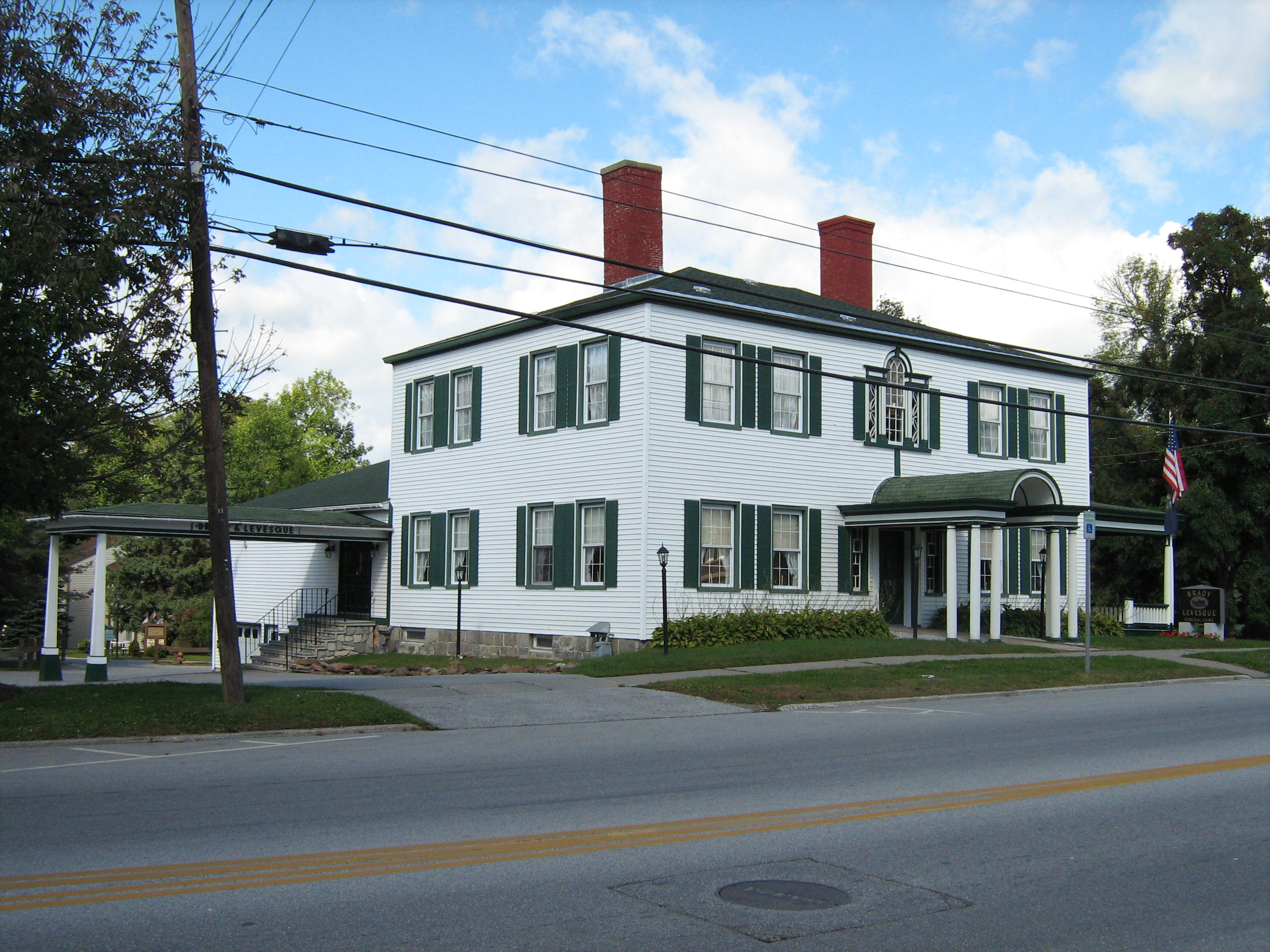

- Location within Vermont Location within the United States
- Location: 86 S. Main St., St. Albans, Vermont
- Coordinates: 44°48′27″N 73°5′5″W
- Area: less than one acre
- Built: 1800
- Built by: Curtis, John
- NRHP reference No.: 72000092
- Added to NRHP: September 4, 1972

The Houghton House is a historic house at 86 South Main Street in the city of St. Albans, Vermont. Built about 1800, with an interior dating to 1829–30, it is a fine and little-altered local example of transitional Georgian-Federal styling, and is one of the city's oldest surviving buildings. It was listed on the National Register of Historic Places in 1972. It presently houses a funeral home.

== Description and history ==
The Houghton House stands south of St. Albans's central business district, on the west side of South Main Street opposite the Bellows Free Academy. It is a two-story wood-frame structure, with a low-pitch hip roof and clapboarded exterior. The front facade is five bays wide and symmetrical, with a center entrance flanked by sidelight windows. Above the entrance is a Palladian window. The interior follows a Georgian central hall plan, with parlors on either side in the front, and a library and dining room to the rear. The original kitchen was located in an ell extending to the rear. The interior woodwork is mainly from the late 1820s, and is of high quality. The parlors feature particularly elaborate woodwork, with a pilastered fireplace mantel, and ropework and dentil moulding in the cornices.

The house was built about 1800 by John Curtis, and was acquired by Abel Houghton in 1828. Houghton was responsible for the later stylistic alterations to the interior, which are believed to have been executed by Henry Bridges, a local master carver. The house remained in the Houghton family until the late 20th century, and now serves as a funeral home.

== See also ==
- National Register of Historic Places listings in Franklin County, Vermont
