= St. George's Catholic Church (Bakersfield, Vermont) =

Historic church in Vermont, United States

- U.S. National Register of Historic Places
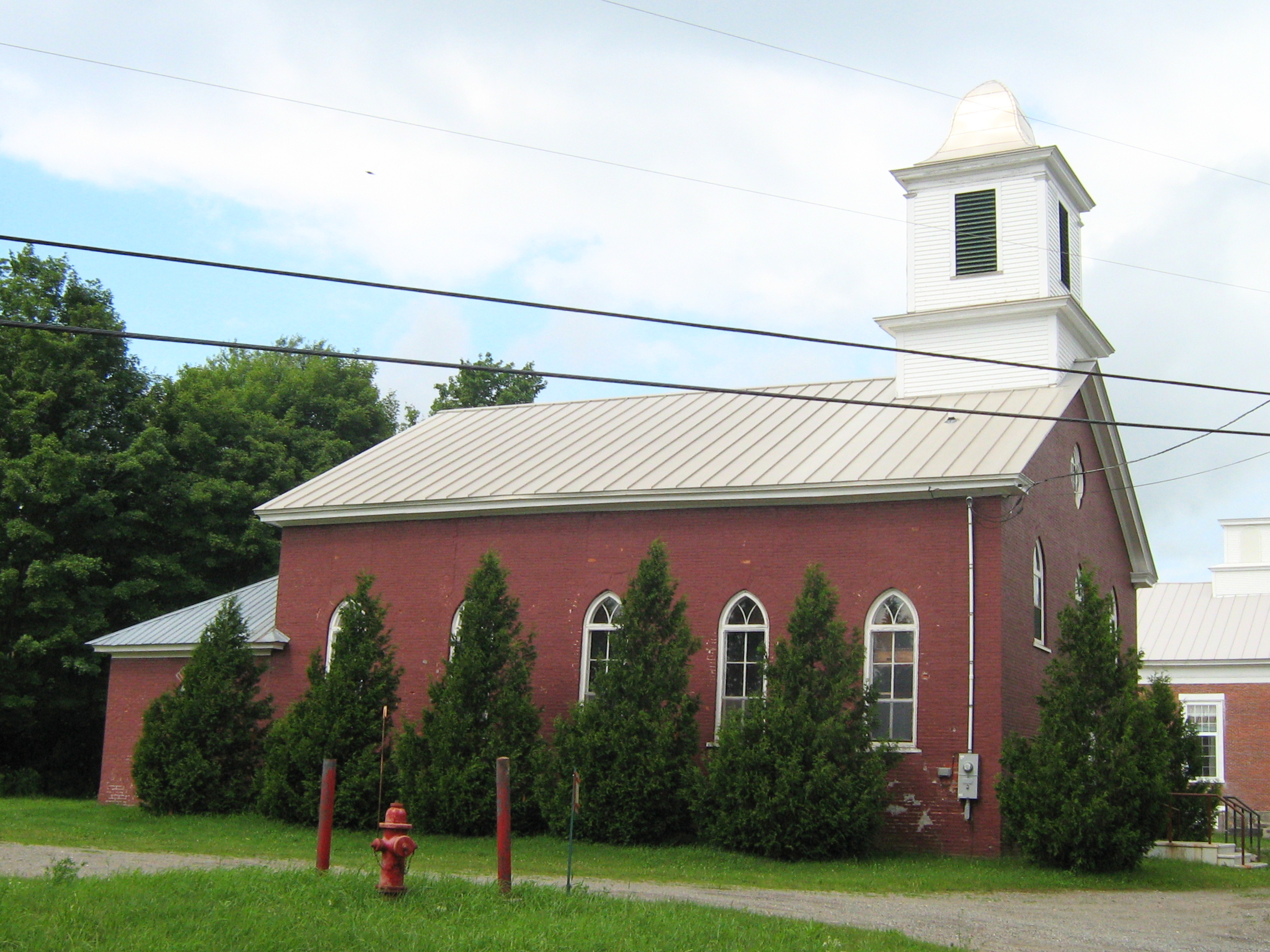

- Location within Vermont Location within the United States
- Location: VT 25, Bakersfield, Vermont
- Coordinates: 44°46′53″N 72°48′2″W
- Area: less than one acre
- Built: 1840
- Architectural style: Greek Revival, Gothic Revival
- MPS: Religious Buildings, Sites and Structures in Vermont MPS
- NRHP reference No.: 01000218
- Added to NRHP: March 2, 2001

St. George's Catholic Church is a historic church and school building on Vermont Route 25 in Bakersfield, Vermont. Built in 1840, it housed the South Academy until 1888, when it was purchased by the Roman Catholic Diocese of Burlington. It served as a church until 1996, and has since then housed the local historical society. It is a prominent local example of Gothic Revival architecture, and was listed on the National Register of Historic Places in 2001.

== Description and history ==
The former St. George's Church building stands in the village center of Bakersfield, on the south side of East Bakersfield Road, opposite the village cemetery. It is a two-story brick structure, with a gabled roof and a single-story rear addition. A squat square tower rises above the roof ridge, with a louvered belfry stage topped by a cornice and bellcast roof. The front facade is three bays wide, with a center entrance on the ground floor, three arched windows on the second, and a rose window in the gable above. The sides are five bays wide, also with arched windows. The interior has a vestibule, which opens to the two-story former sanctuary, with a gallery at the front of the building accessed by stairs in the vestibule area.

Bakersfield was settled in the 1790s, and its citizens began to raise money for a local institution of secondary education in the 1830s. In 1840 this building was erected, and the Bakersfield Academical Institution was established in its second story. The building was given the name "South Academy", and its ground floor was used for religious services by a Methodist congregation. The school reached its peak enrollment of 50 in 1850, and then began a gradual decline, in part due to competition from the North Academy, established in 1844 in the northern part of town. In 1864 the upper floor was taken over by a Masonic chapter, and in 1867 the Catholic diocese purchased the ground floor and bell tower. In 1885 the diocese purchased the rest of the building, and formally renamed it. In 1905 the upper floor was removed, and its windows were restyled in the Gothic Revival. The church closed in 1996, and the building has now been taken over by the local historical society.

== See also ==
- National Register of Historic Places listings in Franklin County, Vermont
