= Evarts-McWilliams House =

Historic house in Vermont, United States

- U.S. National Register of Historic Places
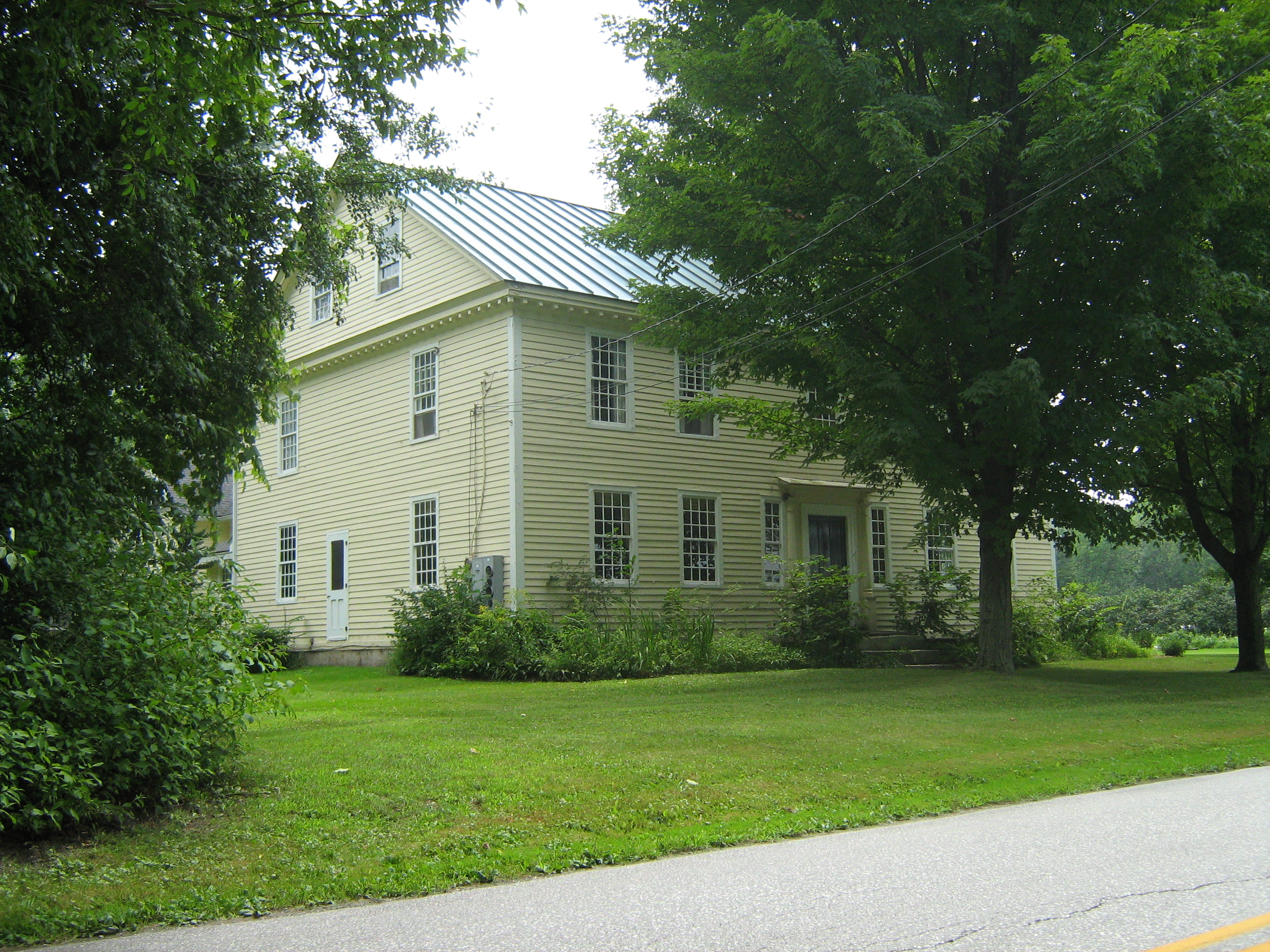

- Location within Vermont Location within the United States
- Location: Georgia Shore Rd., Georgia, Vermont
- Coordinates: 44°46′56″N 73°8′34″W
- Area: 2.6 acres (1.1 ha)
- Architectural style: Federal
- NRHP reference No.: 82001765
- Added to NRHP: October 21, 1982

The Evarts-McWilliams House is a historic house on Georgia Shore Road in Georgia, Vermont. Built about 1799, it is a prominent example of Federal period architecture in northwestern Vermont. It was listed on the National Register of Historic Places in 1982.

== Description and history ==
The Evarts-McWilliams House is located in a rural area of northwestern Georgia, on the east side of Georgia Shore Road a short way north of its junction with Mill River Road. It is a 2 1/2-story wood-frame structure, with a side-gable roof and clapboarded exterior. The main facade is five bays wide and symmetrical, with the centered entrance framed by engaged Tuscan columns supporting an entablature and cornice. The main eave line is decorated with a band of modillions. The interior retains many original period features, having seen only relatively modest alterations for the introduction of modern amenities.

The house was built about 1799, its construction attributed to William Sprats, a builder whose early career in Connecticut is well-documented, where he produced a number of prominent Federal period buildings. His later career in Vermont and adjacent New York is poorly understood, with only one building (the George Meeting House, destroyed by fire in 1952) definitely attributed to him. Of the Federal period houses known in the Franklin County area, this one is the best preserved.

== See also ==
- National Register of Historic Places listings in Franklin County, Vermont
