= Rockledge (Swanton, Vermont) =

Historic house in Vermont, United States

- U.S. National Register of Historic Places
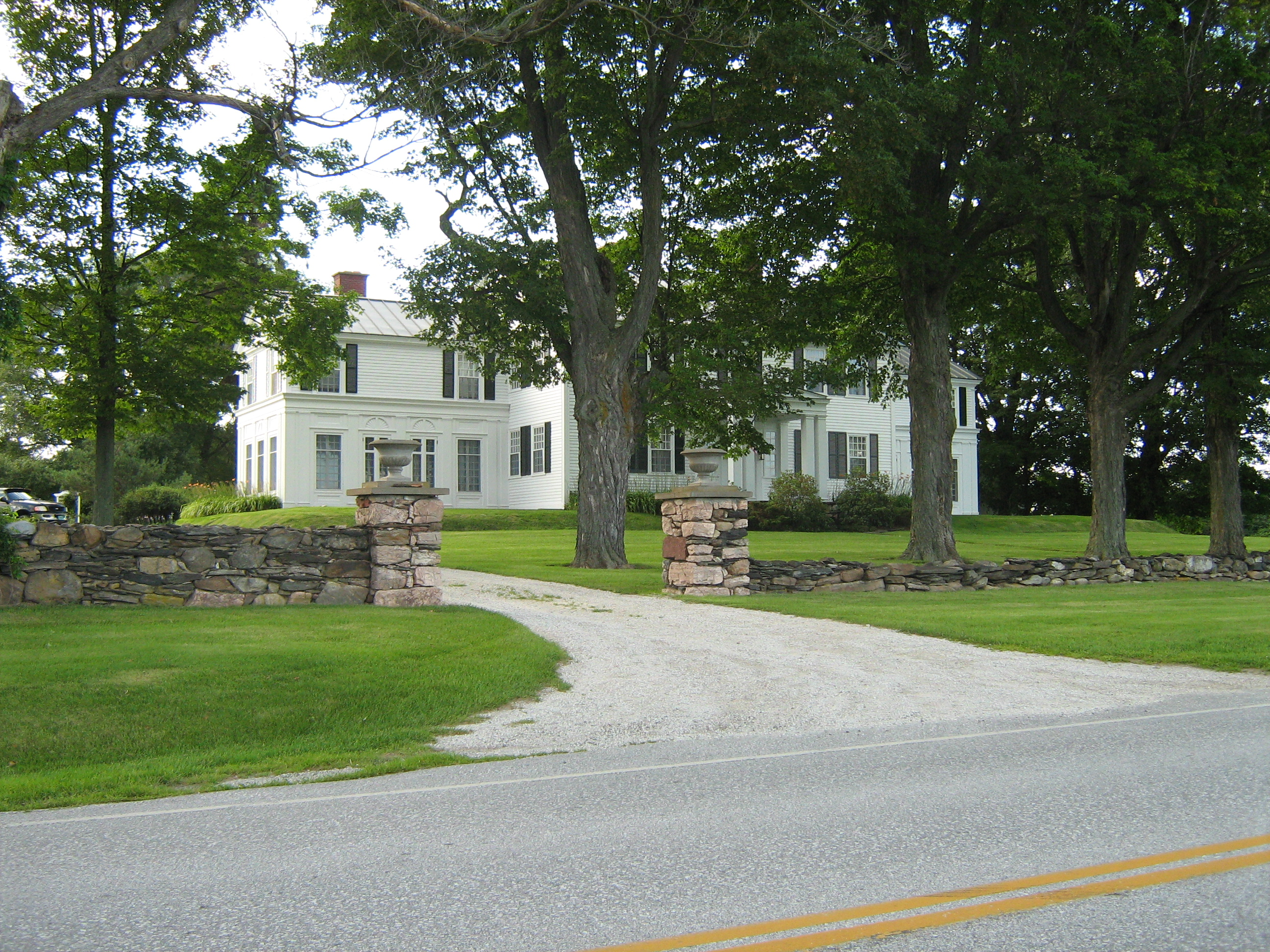

- Location within Vermont Location within the United States
- Location: St. Alban's-Highgate Rd., VT 207, Swanton, Vermont
- Coordinates: 44°52′25″N 73°4′27″W
- Area: 8 acres (3.2 ha)
- Built: 1918
- Architect: Saxe, Charles
- Architectural style: Colonial Revival
- NRHP reference No.: 94000474
- Added to NRHP: May 19, 1994

Rockledge is a historic summer estate house on Vermont Route 207 in Swanton, Vermont. Architect Charles Saxe in 1918 designed alterations to an early 19th-century farmhouse, that is the principal surviving element of an early 20th-century gentleman's farm. The property was listed on the National Register of Historic Places in 1994.

== Description and history ==
Rockledge is located in southern Swanton, on the west side of VT 207 south of its junction with Decker Road. The property is a square about 8 acres (3.2 ha) in size, most of the surrounding historic farmland having been sold off. A stone wall lines the front of the property, with a row of maple trees between that wall and the house. A semicircular drive provides access at two points from the road to the rear of the house. The house is a 2 1/2-story wood-frame structure, with a side-gable roof and flanking two-story wings. The main block facade is five bays wide, with a center entrance sheltered by a Colonial Revival portico supported by clustered Tuscan columns. The gable ends on the sides have Federal-style fans at their center.

The construction date of the house is not known. It exhibits architectural features suggesting it was built about 1803, but shows signs of modifications c. 1819, using technology not available earlier. Much of its inside and out appearance results from a major renovation by Clark Jennison between 1918 and 1920 to a design by Montreal architect Charles Saxe. The home was extensively expanded, and formal Colonial Revival finishes were applied to its interior areas. This era is also marked by the landscaping on the site, which once featured many outbuildings and barns before they were destroyed by fire in 1980. The property is one of Vermont's finer examples of adaptive reuse of an early 19th-century farm property as a summer estate, in this case by members of the same family.

== See also ==
- National Register of Historic Places listings in Franklin County, Vermont
