= Enosburg Opera House =

- U.S. National Register of Historic Places
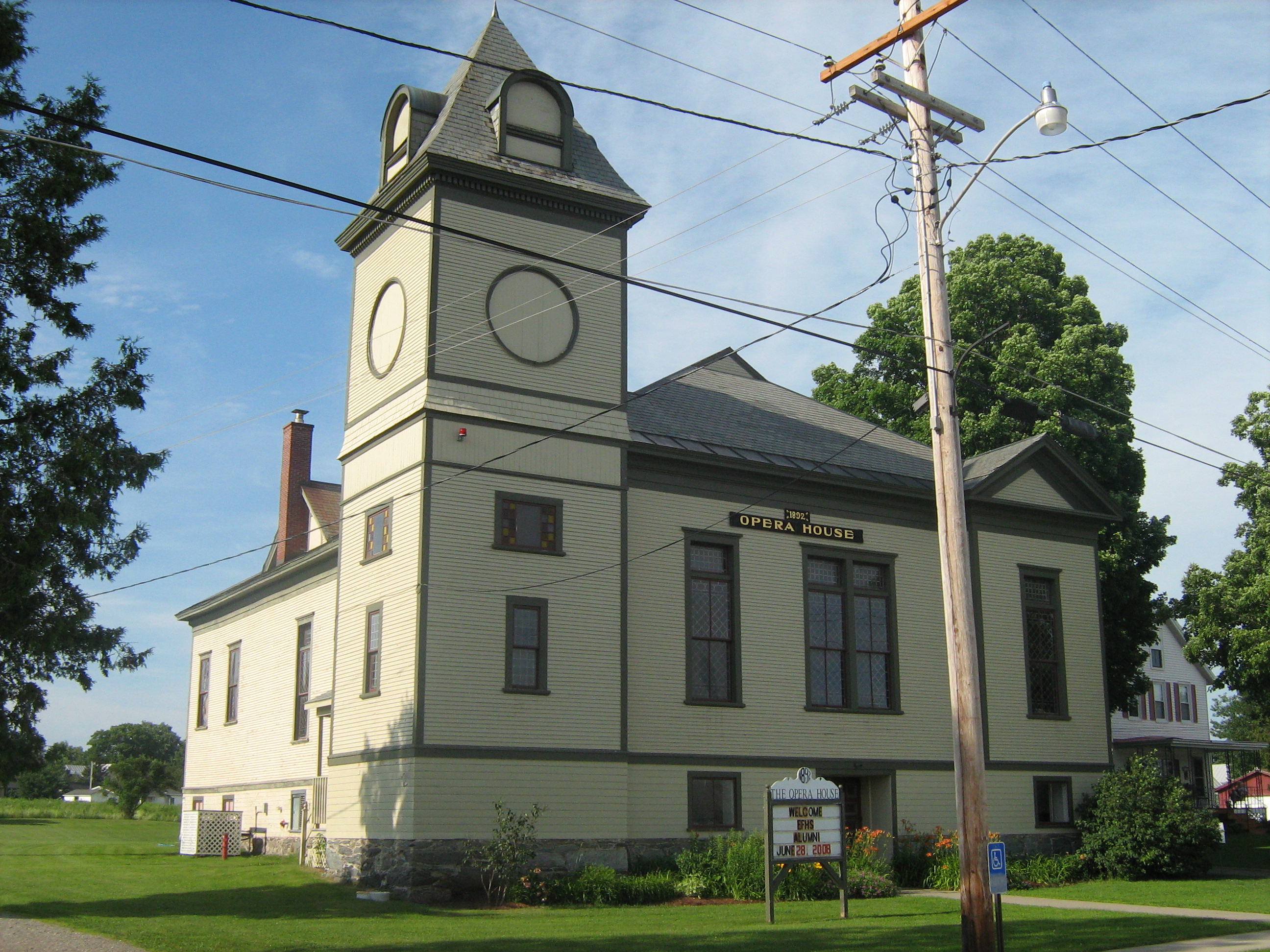

- Location within Vermont Location within the United States
- Location: 123 Depot St., Enosburg Falls, Vermont
- Coordinates: 44°54′31″N 72°48′8″W
- Area: less than one acre
- Built: 1892
- Built by: B.J. Kendall Co.
- NRHP reference No.: 78000235
- Added to NRHP: September 20, 1978

The Enosburg Opera House is a historic performance venue and meeting space at 123 Depot Street in Enosburg Falls, Vermont. Built in 1892 by the B.J. Kendall Company, a prominent local employer, it has been used since then as a regionally prominent performance venue. It also serves as the site of Enosburg's town meetings. It was listed on the National Register of Historic Places in 1978.

== Description and history ==
The Enosburg Opera House stands in the village of Enosburg Falls, on the north side of Depot Street midway between Pleasant Street and Vermont Route 108. It is a large rectangular wood-frame structure, with a single story set on a high basement and stone foundation. A 3 1/2-story square tower rises from one corner, forming a highly visible landmark in the village. It has a gable-on-hip roof and its exterior is finished in clapboards. The main entrance is set in a recess on the street-facing front facade, providing access to the basement level.

The opera house was built in 1892, and was a gift to the town of the B.J. Kendall Company. B.J. Kendall was a local pharmacist who became wealthy marketing remedies for horse ailments. It was formally given to the town in 1894, and has hosted its town meetings since. It also continues to serve as a performance space, having hosted such notables as John Philip Sousa in its early days.

== See also ==
- National Register of Historic Places listings in Franklin County, Vermont
