= Arizona City, Arizona =

CDP in Pinal County, Arizona

- CDP
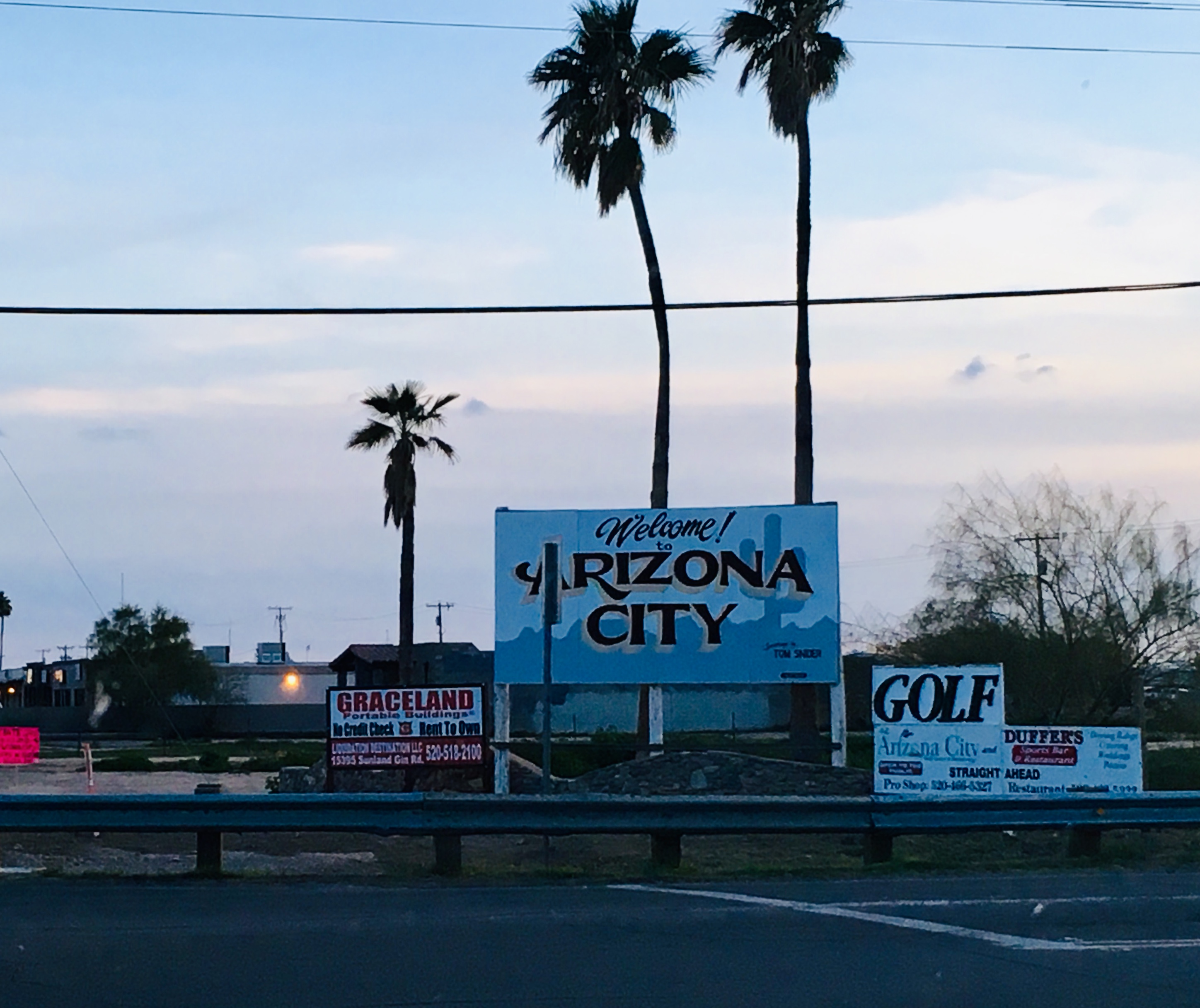

- Location in Pinal County and Arizona

- Location in the United States
- Coordinates: 32°45′6″N 111°40′45″W
- Country: United States
- State: Arizona
- County: Pinal
- Established: 1959

Area
  - Total: 6.21 sq mi (16.08 km^{2})
  - Land: 6.13 sq mi (15.88 km^{2})
  - Water: 0.077 sq mi (0.20 km^{2})
- Elevation: 1,510 ft (460 m)

Population (2020)
  - Total: 9,868
  - Density: 1,609.0/sq mi (621.23/km^{2})
- Time zone: UTC-7 (MST (no daylight saving time))
- ZIP code: 85123
- Area code: 520
- FIPS code: 04-03530
- GNIS feature ID: 0000770

Arizona City is an unincorporated census-designated place (CDP) in southwestern Pinal County, Arizona, United States. It is located near the junction of Interstate 8 and Interstate 10 at the midpoint between Phoenix and Tucson, approximately 60 miles (97 km) from the downtown of both cities. The population was 9,868 as of the 2020 United States census, a decrease from 10,475 people from the 2010 United States census.

Arizona City is a rural, primarily residential community that features a 48-acre (19 ha) man-made lake. These attributes make the community a popular snowbird destination, with the population increasing by as much as 5,000 people in the winter months.

== History ==
The area around what is now known as Arizona City was used as a resting area for Juan Bautista de Anza's expedition party after they emerged from Apache land in 1775. The area is considered an official part of the Juan Bautista de Anza National Historic Trail. This historic trail begins in Sonora, Mexico, and ends at the Presidio in San Francisco, California.

The unincorporated census-designated place was founded in 1959 when Jack McRae, president of the Arizona City Development Corporation, purchased and developed 2.5 acres (1.0 hectare) of land in the Santa Cruz Valley in the area that would eventually grow to become the 6.2 square-mile modern day townsite. The location was selected because of the abundance of deep water from the Santa Cruz River found in the valley. At the time, the water was considered some of the purest in Arizona; every 14 days samples were sent to the state Health Department and would come back consistently rated 100% pure. As the community grew, a Contracted United States Post Office with Free Group E PO Box service was established on April 1, 1962, and Arizona City began appearing on Rand McNally road atlases in 1963. It is uncertain how the name of the community was chosen. Many attempts have been made to establish another form of mail delivery and do away with the outdated method of Free Group E PO Boxes, last vote being held several years ago (which had originally passed) but a re-vote was conducted in winter when part-time residence (winter visitors) returned and it was rejected. Many new full-time families have located in recent years (approximately 2018–2023) and the current method is inadequate. It has negatively affected residents for decades. USPS does not deliver to homes and is a contracted office that holds the bid. Petitions have been established on change.org to establish curbside mail delivery as surrounding areas receive. Many residents are unhappy with the current method.

From time to time, most recently in 2007, attempts have been made to incorporate as a municipality, but they have so far always been defeated at the ballot box, except for the first effort in the early 1980s, which succeeded at the ballot box but was overturned in court because there were not enough residents at that time to incorporate.

The area in and around Arizona City contained several of the 272 concrete Corona Satellite Calibration Targets, which were used to calibrate cameras on the satellites in the Corona Satellite Program that lasted from 1959 to 1972. These satellites were used for espionage on the Soviet Union and China during the Cold War. Many of these have since been removed, but one still exists at the corner of West Alsdorf Road and South Sunland Gin Road in the center of the community.

== Geography ==
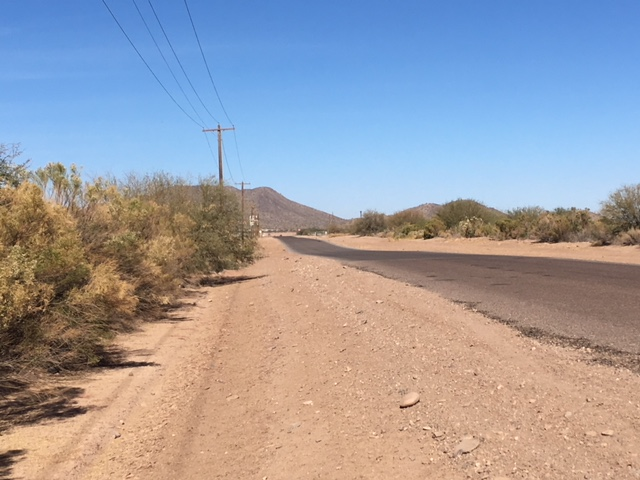
Northerly view towards the Casa Grande Mountains along Henness Road in Arizona City.

Arizona City is located at 32°45′6″N 111°40′45″W (32.751641, −111.679283). According to the United States Census Bureau, the CDP has a total area of 6.2 square miles (16 km^{2}), of which 6.1 square miles (16 km^{2}) is land and 0.1 square miles (0.26 km^{2}) (1.29%) is water.

The CDP is approximately 1,509 feet (460 m) above sea level and located in an area of Pinal County known as the Santa Cruz Flats. According to the Arizona Geological Survey, the valley floor surrounding Arizona City and nearby Eloy has lowered by more than 20 feet (6.1 m) in the past 50 years due to rapid depletion of the groundwater aquifers underneath the region. In 2017, a new earth fissure approximately 1.8 miles (2.9 km) long and 30 feet (9.1 m) wide opened up just south of Arizona City, another consequence caused by the rapid consumption of groundwater.

Arizona City itself is mostly flat, lying in the Santa Cruz Valley in the center of three low mountain ranges; the Sawtooth Mountains to the south, the Picacho Mountains to the east, and the Casa Grande Mountains to the north. Picacho Peak, a prominent peak with a summit elevation of 3,374 feet (1,028 m), is located approximately 20 miles (32 km) to the southeast adjacent to Interstate 10. Directly to the west of the CDP is the expansive Tohono O'odham Indian Reservation, which stretches 80 miles (130 km) south to the international border with Mexico.

== Climate ==
Arizona City

Climate chart (precipitation, max. and min. temperature)
J	F	M	A	M	J	J	A	S	O	N	D
0.2 69 37	0.8 72 40	0.3 79 45	0.1 87 51	0.1 96 59	0.1 105 68	0.8 106 76	0.8 104 75	0.6 100 68	0.6 90 55	0.5 77 43	0.6 67 36
- █ Average max. and min. temperatures in °F
- █ Precipitation totals in inches
Metric conversion
J	F	M	A	M	J	J	A	S	O	N	D
5.1 21 3	20 22 4	7.6 26 7	2.5 31 11	2.5 36 15	2.5 41 20	20 41 24	20 40 24	15 38 20	15 32 13	13 25 6	15 19 2
- █ Average max. and min. temperatures in °C
- █ Precipitation totals in mm

Arizona City has a hot desert climate (Köppen climate classification BWh), normal for the Sonoran Desert. The community experiences long, extremely hot summers and mild winters. The area averages only 5.28 inches (134 mm) of annual rainfall. Winter months are defined by frequent sunshine and consist of mild daytime highs between 65 and 75 °F (18 and 24 °C). At nighttime, the temperature drops rapidly, with lows averaging between 35 and 45 °F (2 and 7 °C). Nighttime lows at or below the freezing mark are not uncommon. During the winter, an occasional cold front will pass through the area sometimes containing a brief shower. The lowest temperature ever recorded in Arizona City was 13 °F (−11 °C). During the entirety of the summer and the second half of May, high temperatures are usually between 100 and 110 °F (38 and 43 °C), with the occasional heat wave spiking daytime high temperatures above 115 °F (46 °C). The highest temperature ever recorded in Arizona City was 119 °F (48 °C).

Along with the rest of Arizona, the community is affected by the North American Monsoon during summer, which brings high winds and occasional heavy rain. A large portion of the community is located in Pinal County's floodplain, and is very susceptible to flash flooding during heavy monsoon rains. Due to extensive farmland in the valley, the area is also very prone to dust storms, which can occur any month of the year during windy conditions.

Climate data for Arizona City, Arizona
Month	Jan	Feb	Mar	Apr	May	Jun	Jul	Aug	Sep	Oct	Nov	Dec	Year
Record high °F (°C)	87 (31)	91 (33)	98 (37)	103 (39)	114 (46)	119 (48)	118 (48)	116 (47)	113 (45)	107 (42)	94 (34)	85 (29)	119 (48)
Mean daily maximum °F (°C)	68.5 (20.3)	72.0 (22.2)	78.5 (25.8)	87.4 (30.8)	96.4 (35.8)	105.1 (40.6)	106.4 (41.3)	104.2 (40.1)	100.3 (37.9)	90.0 (32.2)	77.4 (25.2)	67.4 (19.7)	87.8 (31.0)
Mean daily minimum °F (°C)	36.7 (2.6)	40.0 (4.4)	44.5 (6.9)	50.8 (10.4)	59.2 (15.1)	67.7 (19.8)	75.5 (24.2)	74.9 (23.8)	67.8 (19.9)	55.1 (12.8)	43.1 (6.2)	36.0 (2.2)	54.3 (12.4)
Record low °F (°C)	13 (−11)	19 (−7)	23 (−5)	27 (−3)	29 (−2)	44 (7)	58 (14)	54 (12)	38 (3)	30 (−1)	22 (−6)	15 (−9)	13 (−11)
Average precipitation inches (mm)	0.22 (5.6)	0.79 (20)	0.25 (6.4)	0.05 (1.3)	0.06 (1.5)	0.07 (1.8)	0.76 (19)	0.84 (21)	0.61 (15)	0.59 (15)	0.46 (12)	0.58 (15)	5.28 (134)

== Demographics ==
Historical population
Census	Pop.	Note	%±
1990	1,940		—
2000	4,385		126.0%
2010	10,475		138.9%
2020	9,868		−5.8%
U.S. Decennial Census

Arizona City first appeared on the 1990 U.S. Census as a census-designated place (CDP).

=== 2020 census ===
As of the 2020 census, Arizona City had a population of 9,868. The median age was 44.8 years. 22.5% of residents were under the age of 18 and 25.7% of residents were 65 years of age or older. For every 100 females there were 97.8 males, and for every 100 females age 18 and over there were 95.4 males age 18 and over.

96.2% of residents lived in urban areas, while 3.8% lived in rural areas.

There were 3,908 households in Arizona City, of which 26.2% had children under the age of 18 living in them. Of all households, 46.9% were married-couple households, 19.1% were households with a male householder and no spouse or partner present, and 25.6% were households with a female householder and no spouse or partner present. About 25.7% of all households were made up of individuals and 14.0% had someone living alone who was 65 years of age or older.

There were 4,586 housing units, of which 14.8% were vacant. The homeowner vacancy rate was 2.3% and the rental vacancy rate was 7.0%.

Racial composition as of the 2020 census
Race	Number	Percent
White	6,088	61.7%
Black or African American	454	4.6%
American Indian and Alaska Native	318	3.2%
Asian	78	0.8%
Native Hawaiian and Other Pacific Islander	12	0.1%
Some other race	1,384	14.0%
Two or more races	1,534	15.5%
Hispanic or Latino (of any race)	3,398	34.4%

=== 2010 census ===
The 2010 Census determined that Arizona City had a population of 10,475, a 126% increase from the 2000 Census figure of 4,385. The racial and ethnic composition of the population was 50.3% non-Hispanic white, 2.1% black or African American, 5.3% Native American, 0.3% Asian American, 0.0% Pacific Islander, and 40.9% Hispanic. Population density was 1,713.6 people per square mile.

=== Demographic estimates ===
Average household size was 2.56 persons. 62.3% of households were owner-occupied, and the median value of these housing units was $99,300. The median gross rent in Arizona City was $844 per month.

7.5% of the population was under 5 years of age, 26.5% of the population was between the ages of 5 and 18, and 7.4% of Arizona City's population was born in a country other than the United States.

Only 13.4% of the population in Arizona City has a bachelor's degree or higher, although 83.4% of the population has at least a high school diploma. The mean travel time to work was 27.7 minutes, and the median household income was $42,853, with 20.4% of the population living below the poverty line.

== Economy ==
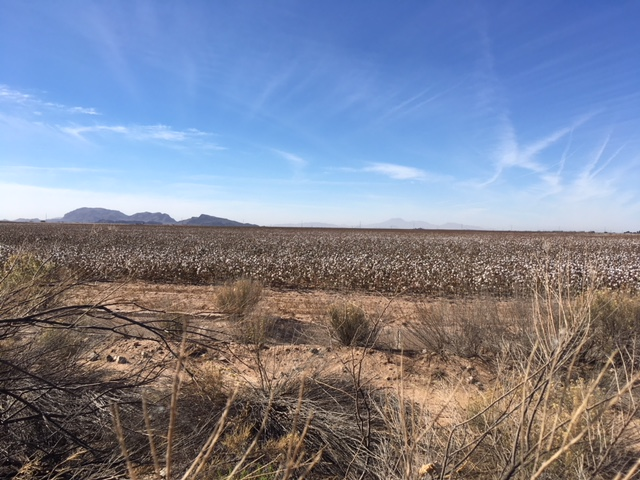
A cotton farm on the west side of Arizona City.

Historically, Arizona City's only employers have been the farms that surround the area and the few service jobs that exist within the townsite. However, being located in the middle of the Arizona Sun Corridor region, Arizona City's economy may soon be impacted by several large proposed attractions and factories that will potentially add 30,000 new jobs and attract up to 4 million visitors annually.

One of these developments is the Podium Club at Attesa, a motorsports complex featuring two 2.8-mile (4.5 km) road courses, a driver experience center, and an event center. This project alone is expected to create more than 10,000 permanent jobs and will be located 10 miles (16 km) to the northwest of Arizona City, adjacent to Interstate 8.

Phoenixmart was promised to boost the economy, the project never came to fruition and the site is just an empty building. Lucid Motors, a Silicon Valley electric car company startup, has confirmed that it will build a $700 million electric car manufacturing plant in the nearby city of Casa Grande that will employ 2,000 workers by 2022.

Services in the area are very limited and travel outside of area is required for basic necessities (30 minutes - 1 Hour) to surrounding cities. USPS in the area is a contracted post office which offers free Group E PO Box service to residents since they do not service the area (curbside delivery or home delivery) as surrounding areas do. Petitions have been established to change the current inefficient and inadequate method.

=== Transportation ===
- Interstate 8
- Interstate 10

Interstate 8 and transcontinental Interstate 10 intersect only 3 miles (4.8 km) north of Arizona City, providing freeway access to major Arizona cities such as Phoenix, Tucson, and Yuma, as well as San Diego and Los Angeles in California. Both freeways can be accessed via Sunland Gin Road. The main east–west surface street through the CDP is Battaglia Drive, which has an intersection with the main north–south street, Sunland Gin Road, at the north end of Arizona City at the community's only signalized intersection. Other main north–south surface streets in the community include Henness Road, Lamb Road, and Overfield Road. Major east-west surface streets include Alsdorf Road and Milligan Road.

The closest major airports to Arizona City are Phoenix Sky Harbor International Airport and Tucson International Airport. Casa Grande Shuttle provides an airport shuttle to Sky Harbor.

=== Attractions ===
- Arizona City Golf Course, opened in 1963, is an 18-hole golf course located within Arizona City that includes a clubhouse, pro shop, and restaurant.
- Paradise Lake, a 48-acre (19 ha) man-made residential lake, is located in the southern portion of Arizona City and can be used for sailing and fishing.
- Skydive Arizona, the world's largest skydiving center, is located 9 miles (14 km) to the northeast.
- Picacho Peak State Park is located approximately 20 miles (32 km) east of Arizona City on Interstate 10 and features several miles of hiking trails, camping, and picnic areas.
- Casa Grande Ruins National Monument is located 20 miles (32 km) north of the CDP and features well-preserved Hohokam ruins and public tours during certain times of the year.

== Events ==
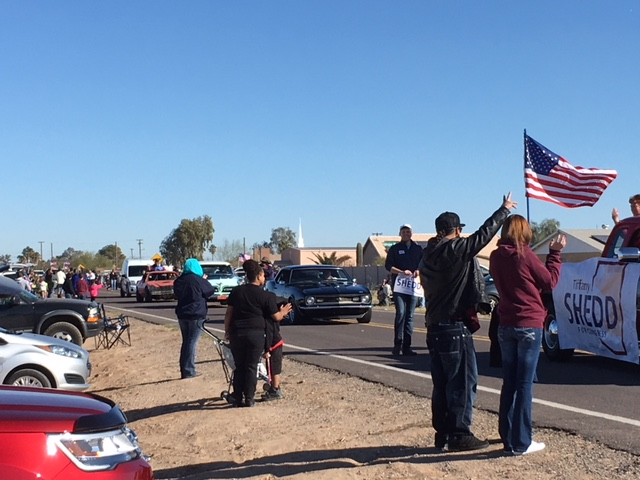
The classic car portion of the 2018 Arizona City Daze parade.

Every February, the community is host to the Arizona City Daze, which is a street festival featuring vendor booths selling food and merchandise, a car show, a parade, carnival rides, and live entertainment. This annual event typically takes place on the final weekend of February.

== Education ==
It is within Toltec Elementary School District and the Casa Grande Union High School District.

The only education facility located in the community is Arizona City Elementary School, operated by the Toltec School District. The nearest high schools are located in Casa Grande and accept students from Arizona Elementary School.

- Arizona City Elementary School, a K–8 school located in the western part of the Arizona City.
- Casa Grande Union High School, a high school located 16 miles (26 km) north in Casa Grande.
- Vista Grande High School, a high school located 11 miles (18 km) north in Casa Grande.

== See also ==
- Coolidge, Arizona
- Florence, Arizona
