= Vermont dairy industry =

Milk producing industry in Vermont, U.S.

Dairy is a primary source of agricultural output in the state of Vermont. As of December 2021, the state had 568 dairy farms milking cattle, sheep, and/or goats which produced 2.5 billion pounds of milk annually. Vermont ranks 15th in the United States for raw milk production.

Dairy farming in Vermont, like in much of the US, is increasingly scaling upwards due to market and governmental pressures. Each year, Vermont loses dairy farms. In 2021, the number of dairy farms shrank by 6.9%, a decline of 68 farms from the previous year.

Family farms with small herds of dairy cows historically defined Vermont agriculture and the cultural landscape of the state. A 2019 survey found that Vermont's dairy industry is considered very important to 72% of Vermonters.

Vermont produces cheese, butter, and yogurt that are consumed across the United States. There are over 140 firms in the state that process milk into dairy products. Some of its better known producers are Vermont Creamery, Cabot Creamery, Ehrmann Commonwealth Dairy, Jasper Hill Farm, and the Grafton Village Cheese Company. The Crowley Cheese Factory in Healdville, Vermont, is believed to be the oldest indigenous manufacturer of cheese in the United States.

The dairy industry is celebrated in various parades and festivals throughout the year, the two most notable being the Vermont Dairy Festival in Enosburg Falls and the Strolling of the Heifers parade in Brattleboro. Each year, the Vermont Cheese Council runs the Vermont Cheesemakers Festival.

== History ==
Dairy farming is the primary source of agricultural income in Vermont. In the second half of the 20th century, developers had plans to build condos and houses on what was relatively inexpensive, open land. Vermont's government responded with a series of laws controlling development and with some pioneering initiatives to prevent the loss of Vermont's dairy industry. Still, the number of Vermont dairy farms has declined more than 85% from the 11,206 dairy farms operating in 1947. In 2003 there were fewer than 1,500 dairy farms in the state; in 2006 there were 1,138; in 2019 there were 658. The number of dairy farms has been diminishing by 10% annually. 80% of open land is controlled by dairy farms.

The number of cattle in Vermont had declined by 40%; however, milk production doubled in the same period due to tripling of production per cow. While milk production rose, Vermont's market share declined. Within a group of states supplying the Boston and New York City markets (called "Federal order Class I"), Vermont was third in market share, with 10.6%; New York has 44.9% and Pennsylvania has 32.9%. In 2007 dairy farmers received a record $23.60 for 100 pounds (45 kg) (11.63 gallons at $2.03/gallon) of milk. This dropped in 2008 to $17 ($1.46/gallon). The average dairy farm produced 1.3 million pounds of milk annually in 2008.

In 2009, there were 543 organic farms. Twenty percent of the dairy farms were organic and 23% (128) vegetable farms were organic. Organic farming increased in 2006–07, but leveled off in 2008–09.

A significant amount of milk is shipped into the Boston market. Therefore, the Commonwealth of Massachusetts certifies that Vermont farms meet Massachusetts sanitary standards. Without this certification, a farmer may not sell milk for distribution into the bulk market. In 2019, two-thirds of all milk in New England was produced by Vermont dairies.

The COVID-19 pandemic led to the dumping of milk.

In April 2025, the industry was reported to have $5.4 billion impact on the Vermont economy, according to a report by the Vermont Agency of Agriculture that was commissioned by the Vermont Dairy Promotion Council.
