= Lewis Storey =

American singer-songwriter and musician (born 1950)

- Born: Lewis Gerald Storey; February 11, 1950 (age 76); Casa Grande, Arizona, US
- Genres: Country, Folk rock, Latin American music, Blues
- Occupations: Singer-songwriter, musician, teacher
- Instruments: Vocals, guitar, piano
- Years active: 1966–present
- Labels: Sony Music Entertainment, PolyGram, independent
- Website: lewisstorey.com

Lewis Gerald Storey (born February 11, 1950) is an American singer-songwriter and musician. He was nominated for Top New Male Vocalist of the Year by the Academy of Country Music, won several Songwriters Guild of America awards, and has collaborated with country music acts like Pam Tillis, Rosanne Cash and John Jorgenson. His most recent album, Storey Road, was released in August 2015.

== Biography ==
Storey was born in Casa Grande, a farming community in southern Arizona, to parents Jerry Storey and Ida Mae Storey. After getting kicked out of high school, he earned his GED and studied political science at Arizona State University. Here he helped plan and performed in the first Mill Avenue street festivals. After graduating, he and his wife Jane Storey joined the Peace Corps and carried out their service in Costa Rica and Venezuela.

In the early 1980s while performing around the American Southwest with the Storey-Richards Band, a Nashville-based repertoire agent spotted and contacted Storey. He was offered a record deal with CBS/Epic Records (later becoming Sony Music Entertainment) and had a couple of charting singles, the highest being "Ain't No Tellin'" which peaked at No. 48 in 1986. In 1987, he was nominated for the Top New Male Vocalist Award by the Academy of Country Music, along with Tom Wopat, Dwight Yoakam, Steve Earle, and Michael Johnson, but lost to Dwight. Later he was hired by PolyGram Records as a full-time staff songwriter and returned to Arizona. This led to collaborations with musicians like Pam Tillis on the 8 Seconds movie. Even though recognized as part of "the rising Nashville elite" in the 1980s, Storey's time in Arizona and Latin America has given rise to a style often described as border music.

He also spent several years teaching music-oriented courses at Casa Verde High School and Central Arizona College where he was distinguished as an award-winning instructor before retiring in 2012. He currently resides in Flagstaff, Arizona, where he creates most of his music.

== Discography ==
=== Albums ===
- 1995: Crazy Heart
- 2013: Roots and Wings
- 2015: Storey Road

=== Singles ===
Year	Single	Peak positions
Year	Single	US Country
1986	"Ain't No Tellin'"	48
1986	"Katie, Take Me Dancin'"	60

== Chart Singles written by Lewis Storey ==
The following is a list of Lewis Storey compositions that were chart hits.

Year	Single Title	Recording Artist	Chart Positions	
Year	Single Title	Recording Artist	Billboard Country	RPM Country
1998	One Night co-written with Rick Carnes and Janis Carnes	J.C. Jones	61	82

== Awards and nominations ==
Year	Organization	Award	Nominee/Work	Result
1987	Academy of Country Music Awards	Top New Male Vocalist	Lewis Storey	Nominated
