= Chuichu, Arizona =

CDP in Pinal County, Arizona

Chuichu, Arizona O'odham: Ce:co
- CDP
- Location of Chuichu in Pinal County, Arizona.

- Location in the United States
- Coordinates: 32°44′41″N 111°47′52″W
- Country: United States
- State: Arizona
- County: Pinal

Area
  - Total: 6.87 sq mi (17.79 km^{2})
  - Land: 6.87 sq mi (17.79 km^{2})
  - Water: 0 sq mi (0.00 km^{2})
- Elevation: 1,460 ft (445 m)

Population (2020)
  - Total: 240
  - Density: 34.9/sq mi (13.49/km^{2})
- Time zone: UTC-7 (Mountain (MST))
- ZIP code: 85193
- Area code: 520
- FIPS code: 04-13190
- GNIS feature ID: 0002910

Chuichu (O'odham: Ce:co name translates as "Many Caves") is a census-designated place (CDP) in Pinal County, Arizona, United States. The population was 308 at the 2020 census. It is the northernmost traditional village on the Tohono O'odham Nation reservation.

== Geography ==
Chuichu is located at 32°44′41″N 111°47′52″W (32.744825, −111.797906).

According to the United States Census Bureau, the CDP has a total area of 2.5 square miles (6.5 km^{2}), all land.

== Demographics ==
Historical population
Census	Pop.	Note	%±
2020	240		—
U.S. Decennial Census

As of the census of 2020, there were 308 people, 82 households, and 65 families residing in the CDP. The population density was 45 inhabitants per square mile (17/km^{2}). There were 102 housing units at an average density of 35.0 per square mile (13.5/km^{2}). The racial makeup of the CDP was 1% White, 98% Native American, and 1% from two or more races. 6% of the population were Hispanic or Latino of any race.

There were 84 households, out of which 44% had children under the age of 18 living with them, 37% were married couples living together, 36% had a female householder with no husband present, and 12% were non-families. 11% of all households were made up of individuals, and none had someone living alone who was 65 years of age or older. The average household size was 4.0 and the average family size was 4.3.

In the CDP, the population was spread out, with 40% under the age of 18, 11% from 18 to 24, 26% from 25 to 44, 18% from 45 to 64, and 5% who were 65 years of age or older. The median age was 24 years. For every 100 females, there were 92.6 males. For every 100 females age 18 and over, there were 86.4 males.

The median income for a household in the CDP was $28,088, and the median income for a family was $32,970. Males had a median income of $31,429 versus $19,583 for females. The per capita income for the CDP was $8,299. About 13% of families and 22% of the population were below the poverty line, including 16% of those under age 18 and 29% of those age 65 or over.

== Education ==
It is within the Casa Grande Elementary School District and the Casa Grande Union High School District.

== Notable person ==
- Augustine Lopez, tribal chairman of the Tohono O'odham Nation
