= Dairy industry in the United States =

The dairy industry in the United States includes the farms, cooperatives, and companies that produce milk, cheese and related products such as milking machines, and distribute them to the consumer. By 1925, the United States had 1.5-2 million dairy cows, each producing an average of 4200 lb of milk per year. By 2007, there were 9.1 million dairy cows with an average milk production of over 20,000 pounds per year and eight pounds per gallon.

== History ==
European dairy practices varied from place to place, and immigrants to the United States would work together to import and improve on the best Europe traditions. One result was a variety of dairy practices across the United States.

== 21st-century farms ==
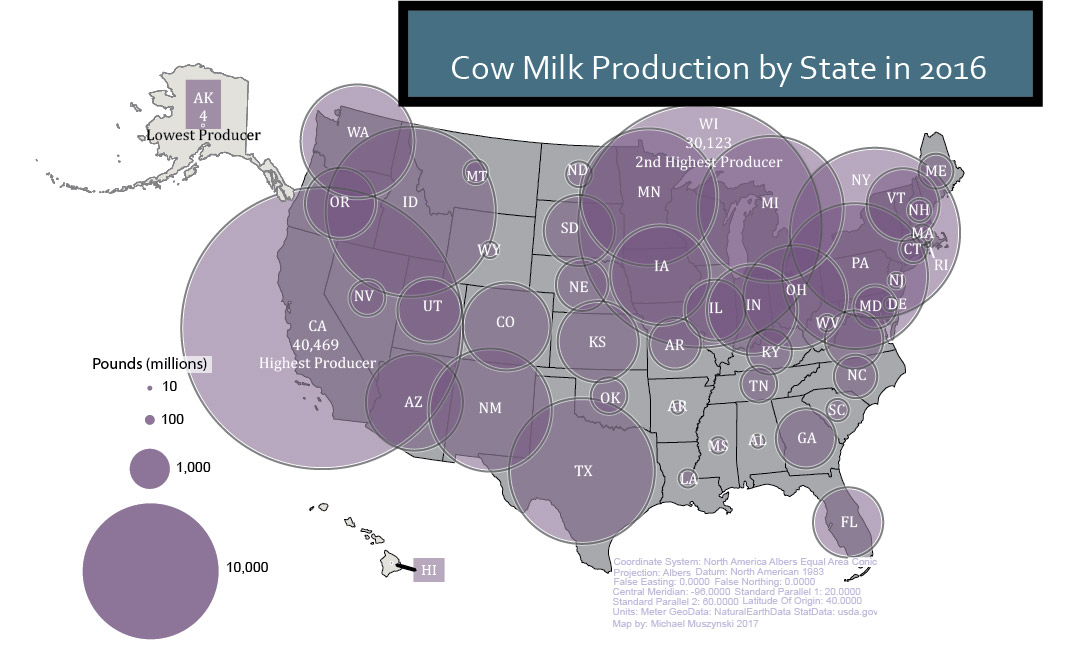
Cow milk production by state in 2016

Number of dairy cows per state in 2025 0–50,000 cows 50,001–100,000 cows 100,001–500,000 cows 500,001+ cows

There were 40,200 dairy farms in the United States in 2018, down from 111,800 in 1995. In 2017 the top five dairy states are, in order by total milk production; California, Wisconsin, New York, Idaho, and Texas. Dairy farming remains important in Florida, Minnesota, Ohio and Vermont.

Herd size in the US varies between 1,200 on the West Coast and Southwest, where large farms are commonplace, to roughly 50 in the Midwest and Northeast, where land-base is a significant limiting factor to herd size. The average herd size in the U.S. is about one hundred cows per farm but the median size is 900 cows with 49% of all cows residing on farms of 1000 or more cows.

== Production by state ==
Production of milk per state in 2019 was as follows:

2019 production of milk
State	Production (million pounds)	Production (%)
Alabama	60	<0.1%
Alaska	N/A	N/A
Arizona	4,769	2.2%
Arkansas	67	0.0%
California	40,564	18.6%
Colorado	4,807	2.2%
Connecticut	428	0.2%
Delaware	74	<0.1%
Florida	2,346	1.1%
Georgia	1,771	0.8%
Hawaii	N/A	N/A
Idaho	15,631	7.2%
Illinois	1,748	0.8%
Indiana	4,073	1.9%
Iowa	5,291	2.4%
Kansas	3,819	1.7%
Kentucky	941	0.4%
Louisiana	135	0.1%
Maine	621	0.3%
Maryland	840	0.4%
Massachusetts	192	0.1%
Michigan	11,385	5.2%
Minnesota	9,931	4.5%
Mississippi	126	0.1%
Missouri	1,100	0.5%
Montana	259	0.1%
Nebraska	1,409	0.6%
Nevada	762	0.3%
New Hampshire	238	0.1%
New Jersey	100	0.0%
New Mexico	8,187	3.7%
New York	15,122	6.9%
North Carolina	902	0.4%
North Dakota	326	0.1%
Ohio	5,425	2.5%
Oklahoma	731	0.3%
Oregon	2,592	1.2%
Pennsylvania	10,108	4.6%
Rhode Island	10.6	<0.1%
South Carolina	206	0.1%
South Dakota	2,810	1.3%
Tennessee	551	0.3%
Texas	13,850	6.3%
Utah	2,262	1.0%
Vermont	2,697	1.2%
Virginia	1,490	0.7%
Washington	6,783	3.1%
West Virginia	90	<0.1%
Wisconsin	30,601	14.0%
Wyoming	146.6	0.1%
Sum	218,382	100%

== See also ==
- Animal husbandry
- Dairy
- Dairy cattle
- Dairy farming
- Dairy products
- Factory farming
- Family farm
- List of dairy products
- List of cheesemakers
- List of dairy products
- List of dairy product companies in the United States
- Managed intensive grazing
- Veal
- Wisconsin dairy industry
