= Billado Block =

- U.S. National Register of Historic Places
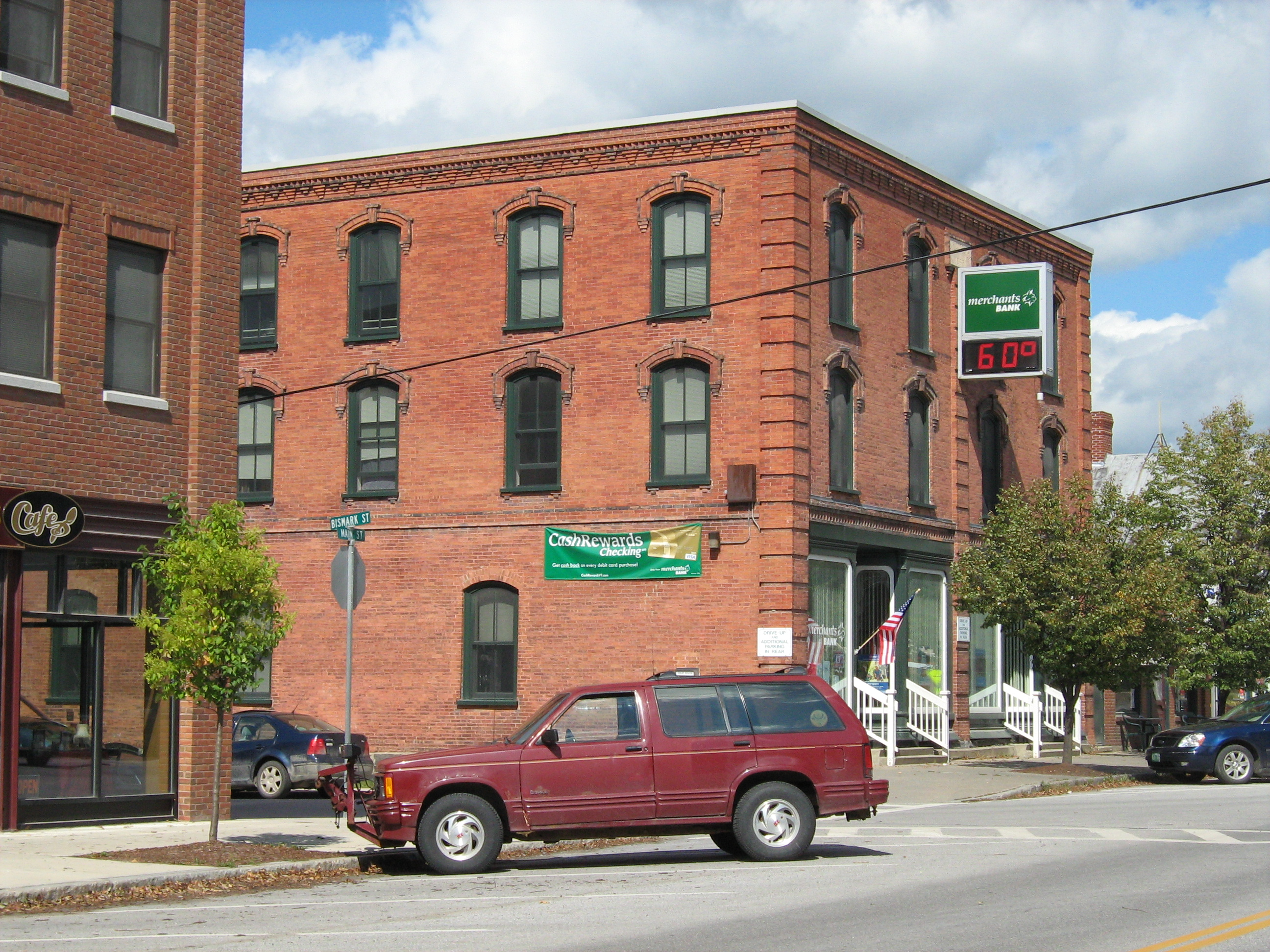

- Location within Vermont Location within the United States
- Location: 371 Main St., Enosburgh, Vermont
- Coordinates: 44°54′28″N 72°48′18″W
- Area: 0.3 acres (0.12 ha)
- Built: 1885
- Architectural style: Italianate
- NRHP reference No.: 07001095
- Added to NRHP: October 16, 2007

The Billado Block is a historic commercial building at 371 Main Street in the Enosburg Falls village of Enosburgh, Vermont. Erected about 1885, it is the town's oldest surviving brick commercial building, built during a period of growth occasioned by the arrival of the railroad in the village. It was listed on the National Register of Historic Places in 2007.

== Description and history ==
The Billado Block stands in the village of Enosburg Falls, at the northwest corner of Bismarck Street and Main Street (Vermont Route 108N), a short way south of the former Missisquoi Railroad right-of-way. It is a three-story rectangular structure, built out of load-bearing red brick walls and covered by a flat roof. Its Italianate styling includes brick corner quoins brick hoods over segmented-arch windows, and a decorative cornice. The front facade is four bays wide, with the ground floor divided into two storefronts, each with plate glass windows flanking a recessed entrance. A banded brick pilaster, similar to the corner quoins, rises at the center of the facade. The ground floor is used for commercial purposes, while the second floor houses apartments. The third floor is open, and was probably used as a storage area when the building housed a general store.

The block was built about 1885 for William Billado, an immigrant from Canada who had established a general store in the village after moving there in 1876. Billado operated the general store on these premises, probably occupying one of the second-floor units as a residence, until his death in 1925. He rented a portion of the ground-floor space to a local bank, and the Enosburg Falls Bank acquired the entire building in 1960. It is now occupied by a successor via merger of that organization.

== See also ==
- National Register of Historic Places listings in Franklin County, Vermont
