= Casa Grande, Arizona =

City in Pinal County, Arizona

Casa Grande, Arizona O'odham: Wainom Wo:g
- City
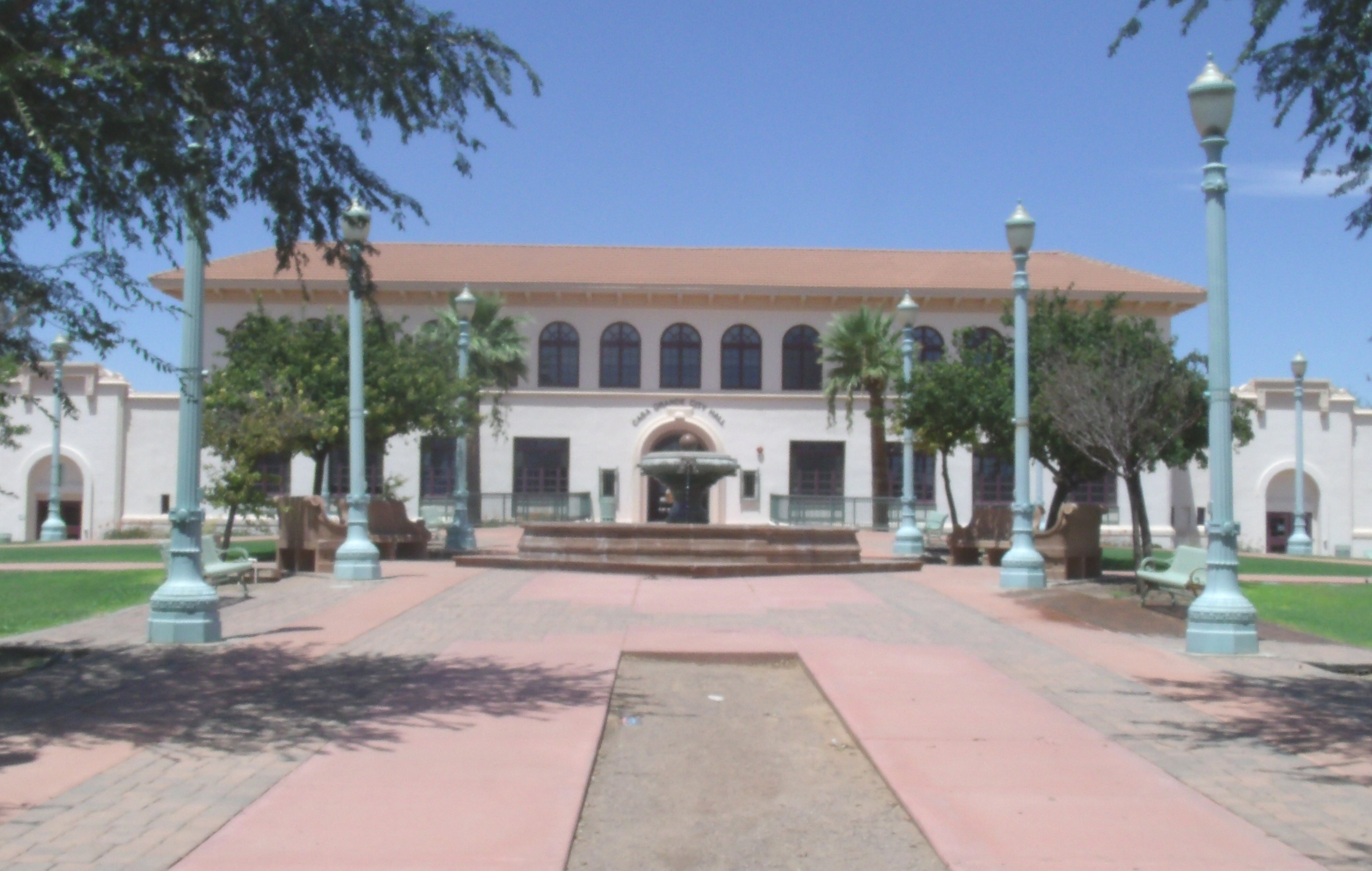
- Historic Casa Grande Union High School which now serves as the Casa Grande City Hall.

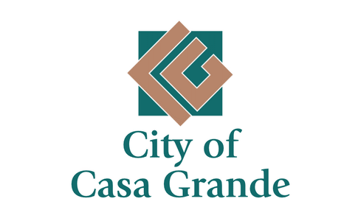
- Flag

- Location of Casa Grande, Arizona

- Location within Arizona Location within the United States
- Coordinates: 32.906895°N 111.763503°W
- Country: United States
- State: Arizona
- County: Pinal
- Founded: 1879
- Incorporated: 1915

Government
  - Type: Council–manager
  - Mayor: Lisa Fitzgibbons
  - Mayor Pro-Tem: Matt Herman
  - City Council: Robert Huddleston; Anthony Edwards; Brent BeDillon; Sean Dugan; Rebecca Romo
  - City manager: Larry Rains

Area
  - City: 113.903 sq mi (295.008 km^{2})
  - Land: 113.903 sq mi (295.008 km^{2})
  - Water: 0 sq mi (0.000 km^{2}) 0.0%
- Elevation: 1,381 ft (421 m)

Population (2020)
  - City: 53,658
  - Estimate (2024): 68,927
  - Density: 605.0/sq mi (233.59/km^{2})
  - Urban: 50,981
  - Metro: 5,186,958
- Time zone: UTC–7 (Mountain (MST) (no DST))
- ZIP Codes: 85122, 85130, 85193, 85194
- Area code: 520
- FIPS code: 04-10530
- GNIS feature ID: 2409401
- Website: casagrandeaz.gov

Casa Grande (O'odham: Wainom Wo:g) is a city in Pinal County, approximately halfway between Phoenix and Tucson, in the U.S. state of Arizona. The population was 53,658 at the 2020 census, and was estimated to be 68,927 in 2024. It is named after the Casa Grande Ruins National Monument which is actually located in Coolidge. Casa Grande is Spanish for "big house". Among resident English speakers, there is no consensus on how to pronounce the city's name. As of 2025 the population of Casa Grande is 70,156.

== History ==
Casa Grande was founded in 1879 during the Arizona mining boom due to the presence of the Southern Pacific Railroad. In January 1880, the community of Terminus, meaning "end-of-the-line," was established with just five residents and three buildings. In September 1880, railroad executives renamed the settlement Casa Grande after nearby Hohokam ruins with the same name. Casa Grande grew slowly and suffered several setbacks both in 1886 and 1893 when fires ravaged the town, destroying all wooden housing structures within. When the mining boom slowed in the 1890s, the town was nearly abandoned, but, with the advent of agriculture, the town survived and was incorporated in 1915.

One of the founding fathers of Casa Grande was Thompson Rodney Peart. Notable fixtures of Casa Grande like Peart Road, Peart Park, and the Peart Center are named after him.

Casa Grande was home to one of the Farm Security Administration's collective farm societies.

From 1942 to 1945, a Japanese-American relocation camp known as the Gila River War Relocation Center was set up outside of Casa Grande. Notable internees included future actor Pat Morita and baseball player Kenichi Zenimura who constructed a baseball field and set up a league in the relocation camp.

Casa Grande is home to the Francisco Grande Hotel & Golf Resort, a former spring training location for the San Francisco Giants. The Giants' then owner, Horace Stoneham, began developing the property in 1959. The first exhibition game was played in Casa Grande in 1961 with Willie Mays hitting a 375-foot (114 m) home run. The Giants no longer play at Francisco Grande, but the baseball bat and ball shaped pool remains in memory of the past ballgames.

During the Cold War, Casa Grande was the location of the Casa Grande Photogrammetric Test Range. These targets consisted of concrete arrows located in and to the south of the city which calibrated aerial cartographic cameras.

Casa Grande has also played a prominent role in semi-professional and collegiate baseball. The Casa Grande Cotton Kings, founded in 1948, qualified to play in the National Baseball Congress World Series ten straight times by winning Arizona state championships in the 1940s and 1950s and were reactivated in the 2000s. They are now members of the Pacific Southwest Baseball League.

== Geography ==
According to the United States Census Bureau, the city has a total area of 113.903 square miles (295.01 km^{2}), all land.

== Climate ==
Casa Grande has a hot desert climate (Köppen climate classification BWh), typical for the Sonoran Desert. The city experiences long, extremely hot summers and brief winters consisting of mild afternoons and chilly evenings. Along with the rest of southern Arizona, the community is prone to dust storms and, in the summer months, is affected by the North American Monsoon which brings high winds and heavy rain.

Climate data for Casa Grande, Arizona, 1991–2020 normals, extremes 1908–present
Month	Jan	Feb	Mar	Apr	May	Jun	Jul	Aug	Sep	Oct	Nov	Dec	Year
Record high °F (°C)	89 (32)	94 (34)	100 (38)	106 (41)	116 (47)	125 (52)	123 (51)	120 (49)	117 (47)	111 (44)	97 (36)	89 (32)	125 (52)
Mean maximum °F (°C)	78.8 (26.0)	82.7 (28.2)	90.8 (32.7)	99.2 (37.3)	106.8 (41.6)	113.9 (45.5)	114.8 (46.0)	113.1 (45.1)	108.9 (42.7)	102.0 (38.9)	89.9 (32.2)	79.1 (26.2)	116.1 (46.7)
Mean daily maximum °F (°C)	68.7 (20.4)	72.6 (22.6)	79.9 (26.6)	87.5 (30.8)	96.4 (35.8)	105.8 (41.0)	106.8 (41.6)	105.3 (40.7)	100.4 (38.0)	90.7 (32.6)	77.5 (25.3)	67.6 (19.8)	88.3 (31.3)
Daily mean °F (°C)	53.9 (12.2)	57.0 (13.9)	63.6 (17.6)	70.3 (21.3)	78.4 (25.8)	87.9 (31.1)	92.5 (33.6)	91.3 (32.9)	85.5 (29.7)	73.8 (23.2)	61.4 (16.3)	53.0 (11.7)	72.4 (22.4)
Mean daily minimum °F (°C)	39.1 (3.9)	41.5 (5.3)	47.2 (8.4)	53.0 (11.7)	60.4 (15.8)	69.9 (21.1)	78.1 (25.6)	77.3 (25.2)	70.7 (21.5)	56.9 (13.8)	45.3 (7.4)	38.4 (3.6)	56.5 (13.6)
Mean minimum °F (°C)	26.1 (−3.3)	29.0 (−1.7)	33.6 (0.9)	38.5 (3.6)	46.5 (8.1)	56.3 (13.5)	66.5 (19.2)	66.7 (19.3)	56.6 (13.7)	42.7 (5.9)	29.1 (−1.6)	25.7 (−3.5)	23.0 (−5.0)
Record low °F (°C)	8 (−13)	11 (−12)	21 (−6)	25 (−4)	32 (0)	44 (7)	51 (11)	55 (13)	37 (3)	25 (−4)	17 (−8)	14 (−10)	8 (−13)
Average precipitation inches (mm)	0.79 (20)	1.00 (25)	0.76 (19)	0.21 (5.3)	0.18 (4.6)	0.18 (4.6)	0.91 (23)	1.52 (39)	0.72 (18)	0.48 (12)	0.43 (11)	0.73 (19)	7.91 (201)
Average precipitation days (≥ 0.01 in)	3.5	3.9	3.3	1.2	1.3	0.7	2.9	4.5	2.5	1.9	1.9	3.8	31.4
Source 1: NOAA
Source 2: National Weather Service

== Demographics ==
Historical population
Census	Pop.	Note	%±
1880	33		—
1890	328		893.9%
1920	948		—
1930	1,351		42.5%
1940	1,545		14.4%
1950	4,182		170.7%
1960	8,311		98.7%
1970	10,536		26.8%
1980	14,971		42.1%
1990	19,082		27.5%
2000	25,224		32.2%
2010	48,671		93.0%
2020	53,658		10.2%
2024 (est.)	68,927	▲	28.5%
U.S. Decennial Census; 2020 Census

According to realtor website Zillow, the average price of a home as of June 30, 2025, in Casa Grande is $321,915.

As of the 2023 American Community Survey, there are 20,816 estimated households in Casa Grande with an average of 2.75 persons per household. The city has a median household income of $66,354. Approximately 14.1% of the city's population lives at or below the poverty line. Casa Grande has an estimated 56.8% employment rate, with 21.1% of the population holding a bachelor's degree or higher and 89.1% holding a high school diploma.

The top five reported ancestries (people were allowed to report up to two ancestries, thus the figures will generally add to more than 100%) were English (74.5%), Spanish (22.5%), Indo-European (1.0%), Asian and Pacific Islander (1.4%), and Other (0.5%).

=== Racial and ethnic composition ===
Casa Grande, Arizona – racial and ethnic composition Note: the US Census treats Hispanic/Latino as an ethnic category. This table excludes Latinos from the racial categories and assigns them to a separate category. Hispanics/Latinos may be of any race.
Race / ethnicity (NH = non-Hispanic)	Pop. 1980	Pop. 1990	Pop. 2000	Pop. 2010	Pop. 2020
White alone (NH)	9,359 (62.51%)	10,904 (57.14%)	12,707 (50.38%)	24,226 (49.88%)	25,089 (46.76%)
Black or African American alone (NH)	600 (4.01%)	945 (4.95%)	1,020 (4.04%)	1,998 (4.11%)	2,413 (4.50%)
Native American or Alaska Native alone (NH)	313 (2.09%)	501 (2.63%)	992 (3.93%)	1,620 (3.34%)	1,500 (2.80%)
Asian alone (NH)	83 (0.55%)	134 (0.70%)	270 (1.07%)	799 (1.65%)	1,005 (1.87%)
Pacific Islander alone (NH)	—	—	20 (0.08%)	74 (0.15%)	158 (0.29%)
Other race alone (NH)	28 (0.19%)	16 (0.08%)	25 (0.10%)	71 (0.15%)	179 (0.33%)
Mixed race or multiracial (NH)	—	—	319 (1.26%)	851 (1.75%)	1,746 (3.25%)
Hispanic or Latino (any race)	4,588 (30.65%)	6,582 (34.49%)	9,871 (39.13%)	18,932 (38.98%)	21,568 (40.20%)
Total	14,971 (100.00%)	19,082 (100.00%)	25,224 (100.00%)	48,571 (100.00%)	53,658 (100.00%)

=== 2020 census ===
As of the 2020 census, Casa Grande had a population of 53,667 and 19,777 households, of which 13,934 were families; the population density was 483.98 inhabitants per square mile (186.9/km^{2}).

There were 23,512 housing units at an average density of 212.07 per square mile (81.9/km^{2}), of which 15.9% were vacant. The homeowner vacancy rate was 2.2% and the rental vacancy rate was 9.7%.

Among all households, 31.6% had children under the age of 18 living in them. Married-couple households accounted for 49.7%, households with a male householder and no spouse or partner present made up 16.5%, and households with a female householder and no spouse or partner present comprised 26.2%. About 23.6% of all households were made up of individuals and 12.7% had someone living alone who was 65 years of age or older.

The median age was 40.1 years; 24.7% of residents were under the age of 18 and 23.1% were 65 years of age or older. For every 100 females there were 92.8 males, and for every 100 females age 18 and over there were 89.5 males.

91.0% of residents lived in urban areas, while 9.0% lived in rural areas.

Racial composition as of the 2020 census
Race	Number	Percent
White	30,274	56.4%
Black or African American	2,629	4.9%
American Indian and Alaska Native	2,254	4.2%
Asian	1,076	2.0%
Native Hawaiian and Other Pacific Islander	180	0.3%
Some other race	8,250	15.4%
Two or more races	8,995	16.8%
Hispanic or Latino (of any race)	21,568	40.2%

=== 2010 census ===
As of the 2010 census, there were 48,571 people, 17,651 households, and _ families living in the city. The population density was 441.15 inhabitants per square mile (170.3/km^{2}). There were 22,400 housing units at an average density of 203.45 per square mile (78.6/km^{2}). The racial makeup of the city was 67.30% White, 4.62% African American, 4.60% Native American, 1.80% Asian, 0.18% Pacific Islander, 16.37% from some other races and 5.13% from two or more races. Hispanic or Latino people of any race were 38.98% of the population.

There were 17,651 households, of which _% had children under the age of 18 living with them, _% were married couples living together, _% had a female householder with no husband present, _% had a male householder with no wife present, and _% were non-families. _% of all households were made up of individuals, and _% had someone living alone who was 65 years of age or older. The average household size was _ and the average family size was _.

The median age in the city was _ years. _% of residents were under the age of 18; _% were between the ages of 18 and 24; _% were from 25 to 44; _% were from 45 to 64; and _% were 65 years of age or older. The gender makeup of the city was _% male and _% female.

=== 2000 census ===
As of the 2000 census, there were 26,224 people, 8,920 households, and 6,547 families residing in the city. The population density was 523.7 inhabitants per square mile (202.2/km^{2}). There were 11,041 housing units at an average density of 229.2 per square mile (88.5/km^{2}). The racial makeup of the city was 64.90% White, 4.27% African American, 4.91% Native American, 1.17% Asian, 0.10% Pacific Islander, 21.09% from some other races and 3.56% from two or more races. Hispanic or Latino people of any race were 39.13% of the population.

There were 8,920 households out of which 37.1% had children under the age of 18 living with them, 52.3% were married couples living together, 15.1% had a female householder with no husband present, and 26.6% were non-families. 21.7% of all households were made up of individuals and 8.9% had someone living alone who was 65 years of age or older. The average household size was 2.80 and the average family size was 3.24.

In the city the population was spread out with 30.9% under the age of 18, 9.3% from 18 to 24, 26.4% from 25 to 44, 19.6% from 45 to 64, and 13.8% who were 65 years of age or older. The median age was 32 years. For every 100 females there were 97.1 males. For every 100 females age 18 and over, there were 91.5 males.

The median income for a household in the city was $36,212, and the median income for a family was $40,827. Males had a median income of $34,858 versus $23,533 for females. The per capita income for the city was $15,917. About 12.4% of families and 16.0% of the population were below the poverty line, including 21.2% of those under age 18 and 12.3% of those age 65 or over.

== Economy ==
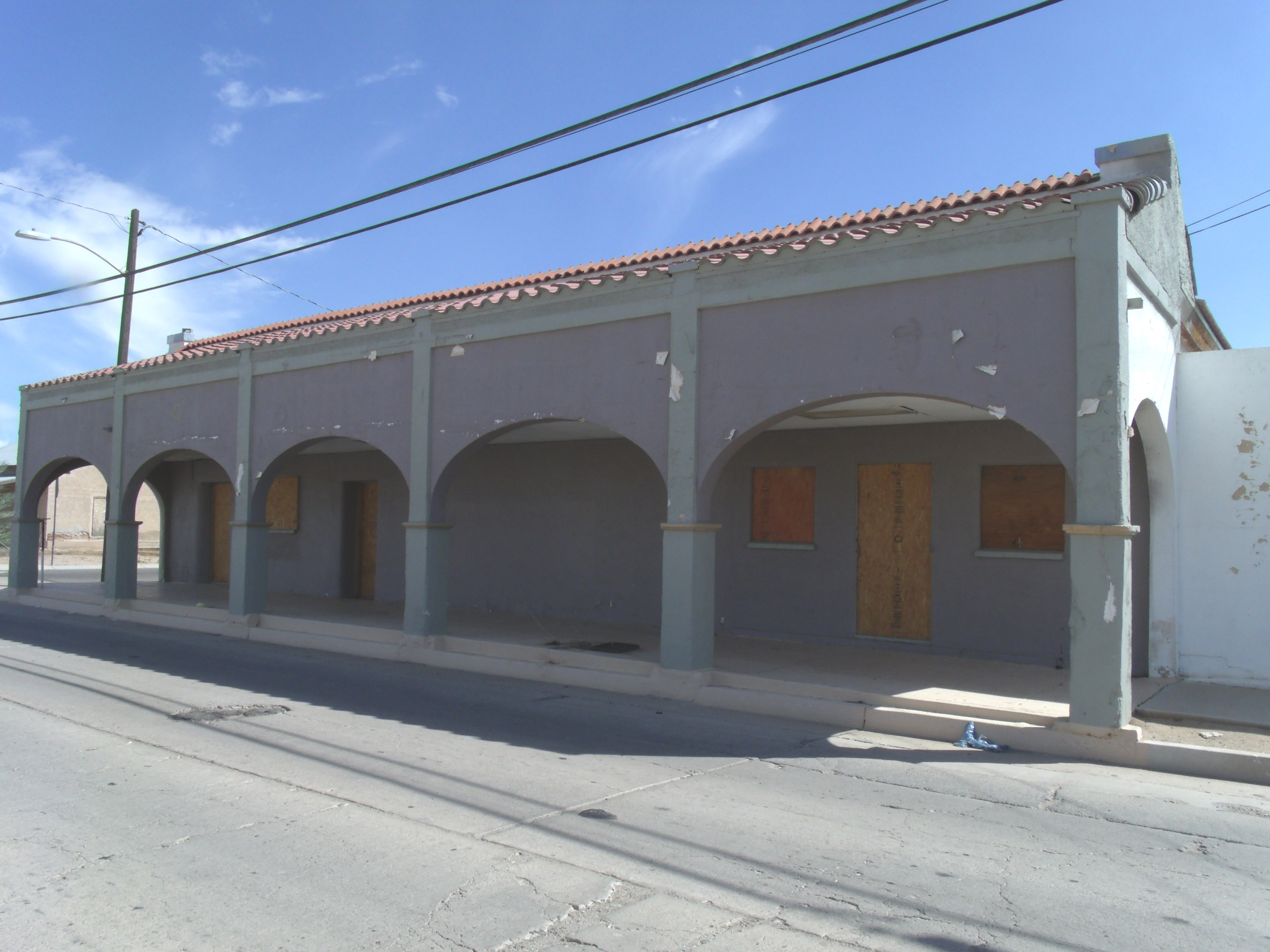
The historic Southern Pacific Railroad Depot was built in 1925 and is located at 201 W. Main St.

The economy of Casa Grande was historically based on rural, agricultural industries, such as cotton and dairy farms. Over time, the city has become home to many Phoenix or Tucson urbanites who own homes in Casa Grande. Most residents either commute north to work in the Phoenix metropolitan area, or to the south, to work in Tucson. This trend has contributed to growth in the service industry of Casa Grande. Many new businesses such as restaurants, gas stations, and retail outlets are opening throughout the city in order to keep up with demand from the growing population.

A retail shopping mall operates in southern Casa Grande. Phase one of The Promenade at Casa Grande opened on November 16, 2007. Built by Westcor and the Pederson Group, it is similar to Desert Ridge Marketplace (an outdoor shopping center in northeast Phoenix). The Promenade at Casa Grande is an outdoor mall, built on a 100-acre (0.40 km^{2}) patch of desert, and contains nearly a million square feet. An additional $11 million was spent by the city to fund the reconstruction of the Florence Blvd./I-10 freeway overpass.

Ehrmann Commonwealth Dairy operates a major dairy processing facility in the town that opened in 2013 and employs about 110 people.

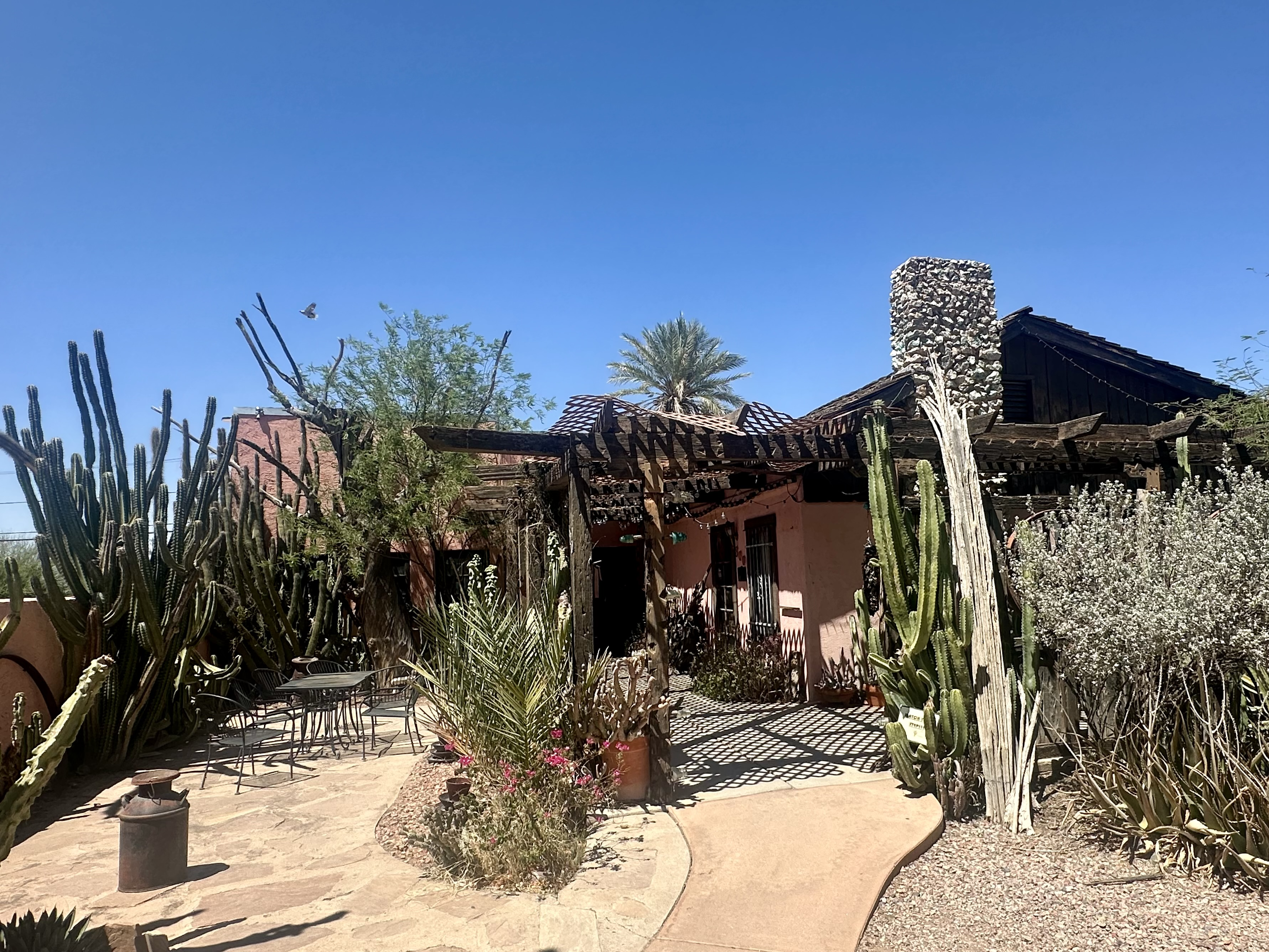
BeDillon’s Restaurant, Casa Grande. BeDillon’s has been featured in Phoenix Home and Garden, The Arizona Republic, The cover of Arizona Highways and BeDillon’s garden has hosted several hundred weddings.

=== Top Employers ===
According to the city's 2024 Annual Comprehensive Financial Report, the largest employers in the city are:

Number	Employer	Number of employees	Percentage
1	Lucid Motors	2,450	10.43%
2	Casa Grande Elementary School District	967	4.16%
3	Walmart Distribution Center	850	3.69%
4	Abbott Nutrition	750	3.26%
5	Banner Casa Grande Medical Center	625	2.72%
6	U.S. Customs and Border Protection	500	2.17%
7	City of Casa Grande	433	1.88%
8	Hexcel Corporation	350	1.52%
9	Tractor Supply Company	322	1.40%
10	Casa Grande Union High School District	318	1.38%
11	Frito-Lay, Inc.	300	1.30%
12	Fry's	300	1.30%
13	Walmart Store	280	1.22%
14	Kohler	270	1.17%
15	Price Industry	270	1.17%
16	Dillard's	200	0.87%
17	Pinal County	200	0.87%
18	National Vitamin Company	180	0.78%
19	Lowe's	150	0.65%
20	Kohl's	123	0.53%
21	Casa Grande Valley Newspapers	118	0.51%
22	Unique Aquariums	104	0.48%
—	Total	13,106	56.98%

=== Electric Cars ===
On November 29, 2016, officials from the state and the Lucid Motors car company announced a $700 million manufacturing plant would be constructed in Casa Grande that would employ up to 2,000 workers by 2022. The Lucid car manufacturing plant opened in November 2020.

== News ==
- Casa Grande Valley Newspapers

== Fire Department ==
The Casa Grande Fire Department (CGFD), ISO Class 2, provides fire protection and emergency medical services to the City of Casa Grande. The Casa Grande Fire Department operates out of 4 Fire Stations and an Administrative Headquarters at the Public Safety Building.

CGFD is serving 109.65 square miles with over 60,000 residents.

Dave Kean is the Fire Chief for the City of Casa Grande. In 2021-22 Chief Kean led the fight for the City to form their own ambulance transportation service and obtain a “Certificate of Necessity” from the Arizona Department of Health. This allowed the CGFD to expand by 26 members. Just prior to that he had added a full-time Ladder company (12 new firefighters) to the Department.

In 2023, Chief Kean got funding for a new Fire Station 503 at a cost over $13.4 million. This is the first new fire facility in over 14 years.

== Library ==
The Casa Grande Public Library provides the standard services of access to reading materials, as well as some special services, including a volunteer reading club for elementary school, internet access, and a talking book program. The main library is 16,000 square feet (1,500 m^{2}), provides 75,000 volumes, and provides 38 public access computers with internet access. The Vista Grande Public Library, a branch of the Casa Grande Library System, opened in the summer of 2009.

== City Court ==
The Casa Grande Municipal Court is the judicial branch of Casa Grande City government and accepted 6,609 filings, conducted 2,486 arraignments and held 156 civil, criminal and jury trials in Fiscal Year 2006–2007.

== Notable people ==
- Mike Candrea, UA Softball Coach, Olympic Softball Coach
- Eduardo C. Corral, award-winning poet and teacher
- Fred Enke, University of Arizona basketball, football and golf coach
- Fred Enke, Jr., professional football quarterback and cotton farmer
- Pablo Francisco, stand-up comedian
- Pedro E. Guerrero, photographer
- Jesus Ramos Jr., Boxer - super welterweight the WBC Interim Middleweight Champion
- Joe Jonas, pop singer, musician, actor, and dancer
- Joy Oladokun, singer-songwriter
- Lewis Storey, singer-songwriter
- Michael Sullivan, stonemason who built many structures of fieldstone in Casa Grande
- Alex Torres, guitarist

== Education ==
Most of Casa Grande is in the Casa Grande Elementary School District, while a portion is in the Toltec Elementary School District. All of Casa Grande is in the Casa Grande Union High School District.

The following schools are located in Casa Grande.

Public Elementary

- Cottonwood Elementary School
- Saguaro Elementary School
- Center for Online and Innovative Learning (COIL)
- Ironwood Elementary School
- Cholla Elementary School
- Palo Verde Elementary School
- Mesquite Elementary School
- Desert Willow Elementary School
- McCartney Ranch Elementary School

Public Middle School

- Casa Grande Middle School
- Cactus Middle School
- Villago Middle School

Public High School

- Casa Grande Union High School
- PACE (Pathways Accelerating Career Experiences)
- Vista Grande High School

Charter High School

- Pinnacle Charter High School
- Casa Verde High School
- ASU Preparatory Academy, Casa Grande
- Mission Heights Preparatory High School
- PPEP TEC High School

Charter Schools

- Grande Innovation Academy
- Legacy Traditional School

Private

- St Anthony of Padua Catholic School (Private)
- Logos Christian Academy (Private)

Colleges

- Central Arizona College
- Northern Arizona University (Extended Learning Campus)

== Transportation ==
These highways serve Casa Grande.

- Interstate 8
- Interstate 10
- the proposed Interstate 11 would begin in Casa Grande and end in Las Vegas, Nevada
- Arizona State Route 287
- Arizona State Route 84
- Arizona State Route 387

The City of Coolidge operates Central Arizona Regional Transit (CART), which provides transportation between Florence, Coolidge, Central Arizona College and Casa Grande. Greyhound serves Casa Grande from a stop in Eloy.

Casa Grande Municipal Airport serves the city but it lacks commercial airline service. The closest major airports to Casa Grande with commercial airlines are Phoenix Sky Harbor International Airport and Tucson International Airport. Casa Grande Shuttle provides an airport shuttle to Sky Harbor.

== See also ==
- List of historic properties in Casa Grande, Arizona
- Gila River Indian Community Emergency Medical Services
- Casa Grande bombing
