= VGHS (disambiguation) =

VGHS stands for Video Game High School, an American web series. It may also refer to:

- Hazrat Shahjalal International Airport, the largest airport in Bangladesh
- Victoria Girls' High School, Grahamstown, South Africa
- Video Game High School, a fictional school within a web series by the same name
- Vista Grande High School, Casa Grande, Arizona, United States
- Vivian G. Harsh Society, an American literary society
