= New Jersey dairy industry =

Overview of the milk producing industry in New Jersey

Dairy was formerly an important part of the agricultural production of the state of New Jersey. As of 2018, the state has 50 dairies, down from 200 around the year 2000, and a total of 5,500 cows. The state produces around 119 million pounds (54 million kilograms) of milk per year. New Jersey ranks 44th of the 50 states in milk production.

== History ==
In the middle of the 20th century, New Jersey had over 500 dairy farms, with many delivering milk directly to residents homes.

Due to both governmental and industry changes since that time, many small New Jersey dairy farms have disappeared. Many were lost to the waves of suburban development and others simply could not compete with the larger, more industrial operations of the Midwest. Dairies in the state no longer sold directly to the residents of their particular region, but sold their milk to processing plants which would then handle milk distribution. This led to a fall in prices, which led to the merger or closure of many state dairy farms.
