= New York dairy industry =

Overview of the milk producing industry in New York

Dairy is a significant part of the agricultural output of New York state. New York ranks fourth out of the fifty states in dairy production. The state's nearly 4,000 dairy farms annually produce over 15 billion pounds of milk.

== History ==
During the colonial era, dairy cows were a typical part of farms. Their milk was turned into butter and cheese which could be stored easily

At the end of the 19th century, with the population of the state rapidly expanding, farms began to focus entirely on dairy. Farms became larger operations that shipped their products to cities in their regions on railroad. With the advent of refrigeration and strict food safety laws, fresh unadulterated milk could easily be purchased by all classes.

Today, dairy farming is concentrated in Upstate New York.

== Environmental impact ==
The manure produced by the New York dairy industry has been a notable source of pollution to nearby bodies of water. For instance, streams in Upstate New York have seen elevated levels of estrogen linked with manure lagoons either overflowing or leaking into groundwater. Higher levels of estrogen in water ecosystems can inhibit reproduction in aquatic creatures such as fish. In the Cannonsville watershed, agriculture that is mainly dairy production is estimated to be responsible for 55-70% of phosphorus non-point source pollution.

== See also ==
- Swill milk scandal
