= Augustine Lopez =

American politician (1935–2013)

Augustine Baptisto Lopez, Sr. (February 1, 1935 – April 18, 2013) was the tribal chairman of the Tohono O'odham Nation, Arizona.

Born in Santa Rosa, Arizona, Lopez served in the United States Air Force and was a cowboy, irrigator, musician and rancher. He served in the Tohono O'odham tribal government, was vice-chairman, and then served as tribal chairman of the Tohono O'odham 1971–1973. He is father to Gerti Lopez, one of the only woman bandleaders for waila music. He died in Chuichu, Arizona.
