= Vermont Dairy Festival =

American annual event

- Location: Vermont
- Country: United States

The Vermont Dairy Festival is an annual festival dedicated to the Vermont dairy industry, typically held on the first weekend of June in Enosburg Falls, Vermont.

== History ==
The Vermont Dairy Festival was first held in 1956. Initially known as Dairy Days with a focus on celebrating the dairy industry for farmers, it eventually became the Franklin County Dairy Festival and then the Vermont Dairy Festival.

It is run by the Enosburg Falls Lions Club and proceeds from the festival are disbursed to local community causes and organizations. About 20,000 people attended the event in past years.

In 2020 and again in 2021, it was cancelled due to the COVID-19 pandemic. The festival resumed in 2022, with farmers recognizing consumer concerns with the environmental impacts of dairy farming, stating that the festival would be an educational opportunity.
