= Casa Verde High School =

Coordinates: 32.8862°N 111.7479°W

Casa Grande Verde High School

Location
- 2730 N. Trekell Road; Casa Grande, Arizona 85122; United States

Information
- School type: Charter high school
- Established: 2001
- Closed: 2017
- School district: Casa Grande Union High School District
- CEEB code: 030693
- Principal: Thomas Trigalet
- Grades: 9-12
- Mascot: Panthers

Casa Verde High School is a career and college preparatory high school in Casa Grande, Arizona. It is part of the Casa Grande Union High School District.
