= Francisco Grande =

Hotel and golf resort in Arizona

- Interactive map of the Francisco Grande area

General information
- Location: 26000 W Gila Bend Hwy., Casa Grande, Arizona, US, 85193
- Coordinates: 32°52′49″N 111°50′50″W
- Opening: 1959

Website
- franciscogrande.com

Francisco Grande is a hotel and golf resort located in Casa Grande, Arizona, approximately 46 miles south east of Phoenix.

== History ==
In 1959 the San Francisco Giants' owner Horace Stoneham developed the property as a spring training camp for his popular Major League Baseball team. The name of the property was taken from the San "Francisco" Giants and Casa "Grande".

During its early years, the hotel was popular with celebrities like John Wayne and Pat Boone. Guests are able to stay in their eponymously titled suites.

After the Giants moved to the original Scottsdale Stadium, the California Angels used the facility from 1982 until 1984. The next two years saw the transformation of the baseball fields into football fields, which were used as the training camp headquarters for the USFL's Arizona Wranglers and the Denver Gold.

From 1984 to 2002, the Francisco Grande operated as a destination golf resort. The course was 5,224 yards from the front tees and a long 7,545 yards from the championship tees.

In 2003, the resort was closed for renovations which cost approximately $8.5 million. It reopened in 2005.

== Facilities ==
There are two restaurants within the hotel – Duke's and Legends. Duke's is named after John Wayne and Legends specializes in Southwestern cuisine.
