= Casa Grande Photogrammetric Test Range =

Satellite camera test range

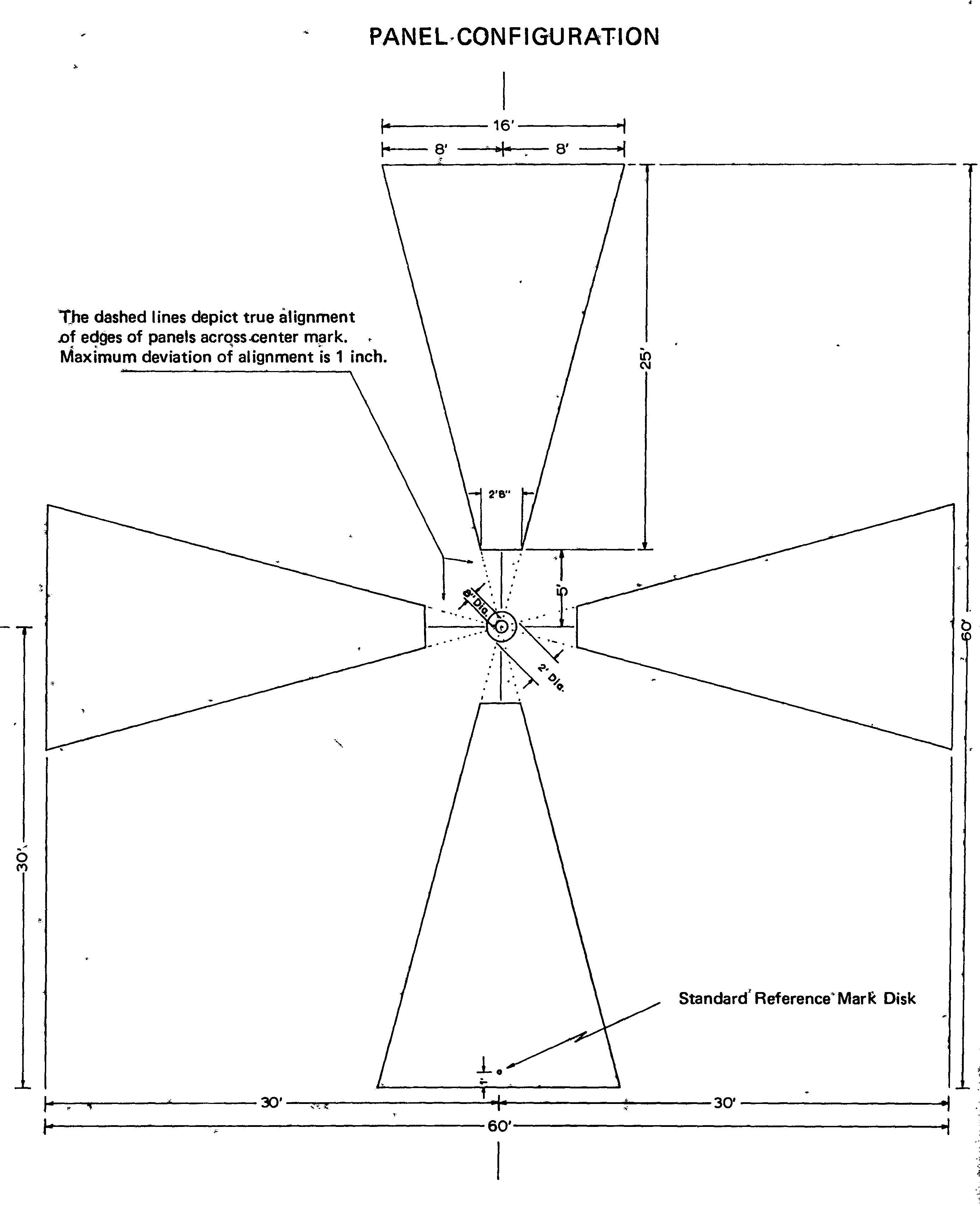
- Target dimensions of the Casa Grande Test Range crosses

General information
- Location: Casa Grande, Arizona, US
- Coordinates: 32°45′46″N 111°44′19″W
- Closed: 1972
- Owner: National Foreign Intelligence Program

The Casa Grande Photogrammetric Test Range is a test range established in the mid-1960s to test the dynamic performance of aerial survey cameras. The range consisted of 272 concrete calibration markers embedded into the Earth's surface in and around Casa Grande, Arizona, United States. The markers are commonly (and erroneously) believed to have been used to aid camera calibration for the US Central Intelligence Agency's Corona spy satellite program; in fact, they were used as references for aerial surveys through photogrammetry. The markers formed a square 16-by-16-mile (26 by 26 km) grid, and were maintained from 1959 to 1972. Some of the original markers can still be found on satellite maps and ground inspection. See links to maps below.

== Background ==
Following the launch of Corona satellites in the 1960s, the US National Foreign Intelligence Program determined that there was a need for calibration under the Controlled Range Network. Working with the Arizona Real Estate Office, the US Army Map Service was directed to lease land for office space in Casa Grande, Arizona. Land was leased in 100-by-100-foot (30 by 30 m) parcels, with access to a road. Large concrete Maltese crosses in the ground, each 60 feet (18 m) in width, were in place by 1967. The crosses were arranged in a 16-by-16-mile (26 by 26 km) grid. The cross-shaped patterns were used to calibrate aerial photography equipment for aircraft. The Corona satellite program used a different "tri-bar" calibration pattern.

The majority of the targets were abandoned when the program ended in 1972. By the late-1970s, the US Army Map Service considered the targets to be obsolete for their use as the land on which they were situated had subsided because of groundwater extraction. Land lessees were then given the option of having the targets removed and dumped near Eloy, Arizona. As of 2013, at least 143 targets remain in place, unless they have been removed because the location has been redeveloped.

== Images ==
The Casa Grande Calibration Targets pictured in the image gallery are two of the few remaining ones in the Sonoran Desert. The first one is located on the southeast corner of South Montgomery and West Cornman Roads. The second one is located on the northeast corner of West Cornman Road and Carmel Boulevard.

Two calibration targets in Casa Grande, Arizona.
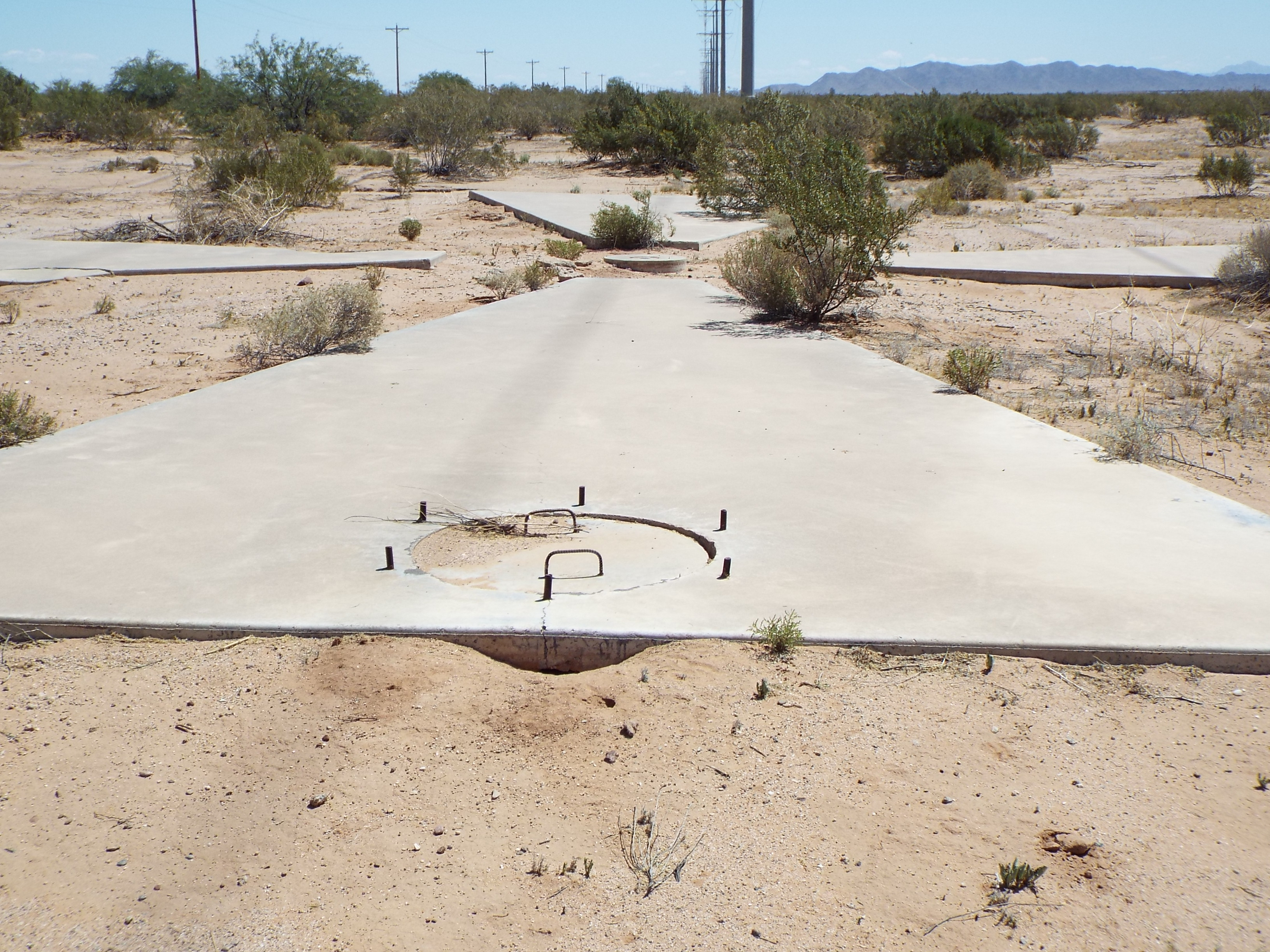
Target X47, in Casa Grande, the first target installed.

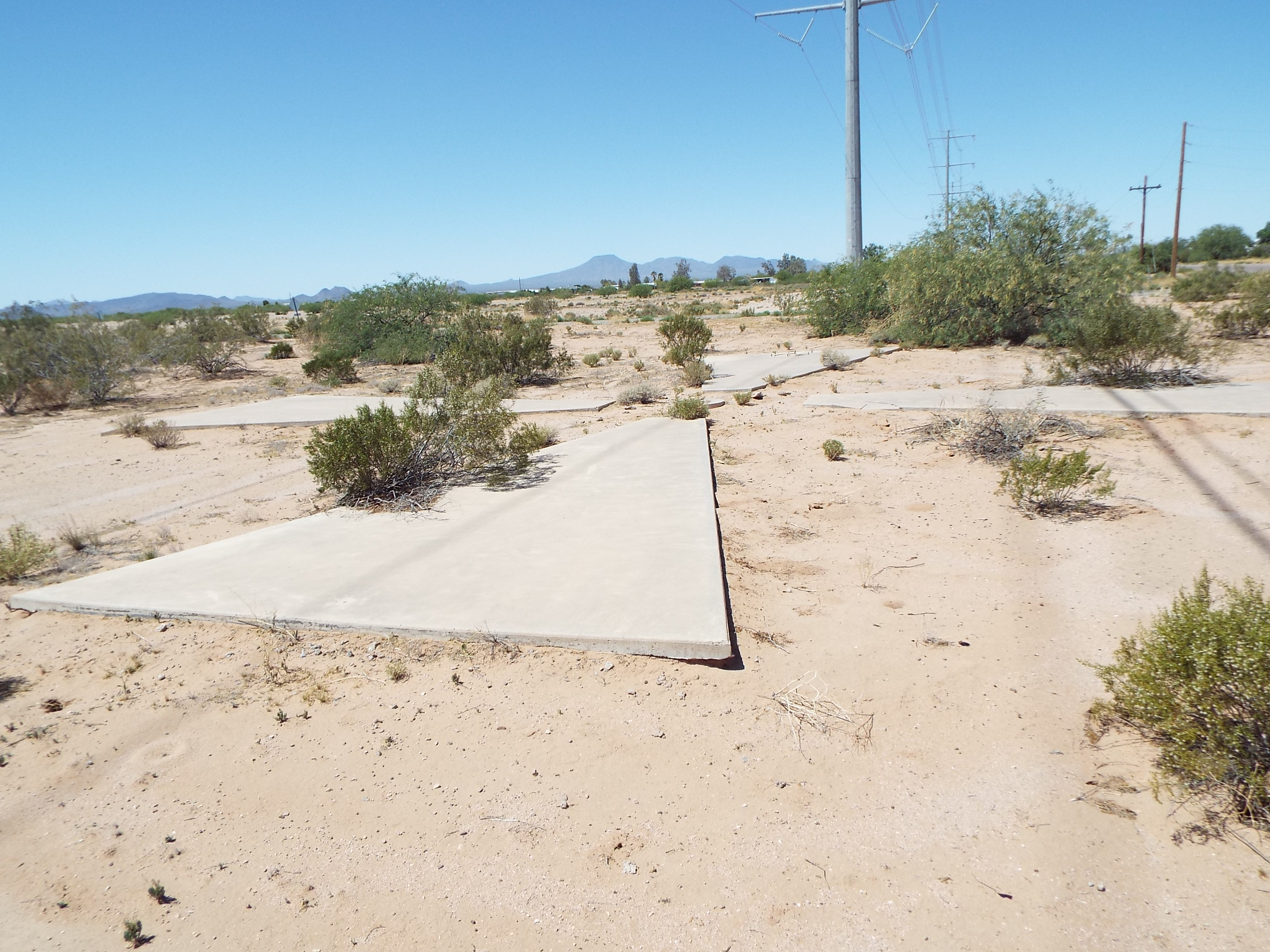
The first calibration target is located on the southeast corner of South Montgomery Road and West Cornman Road.

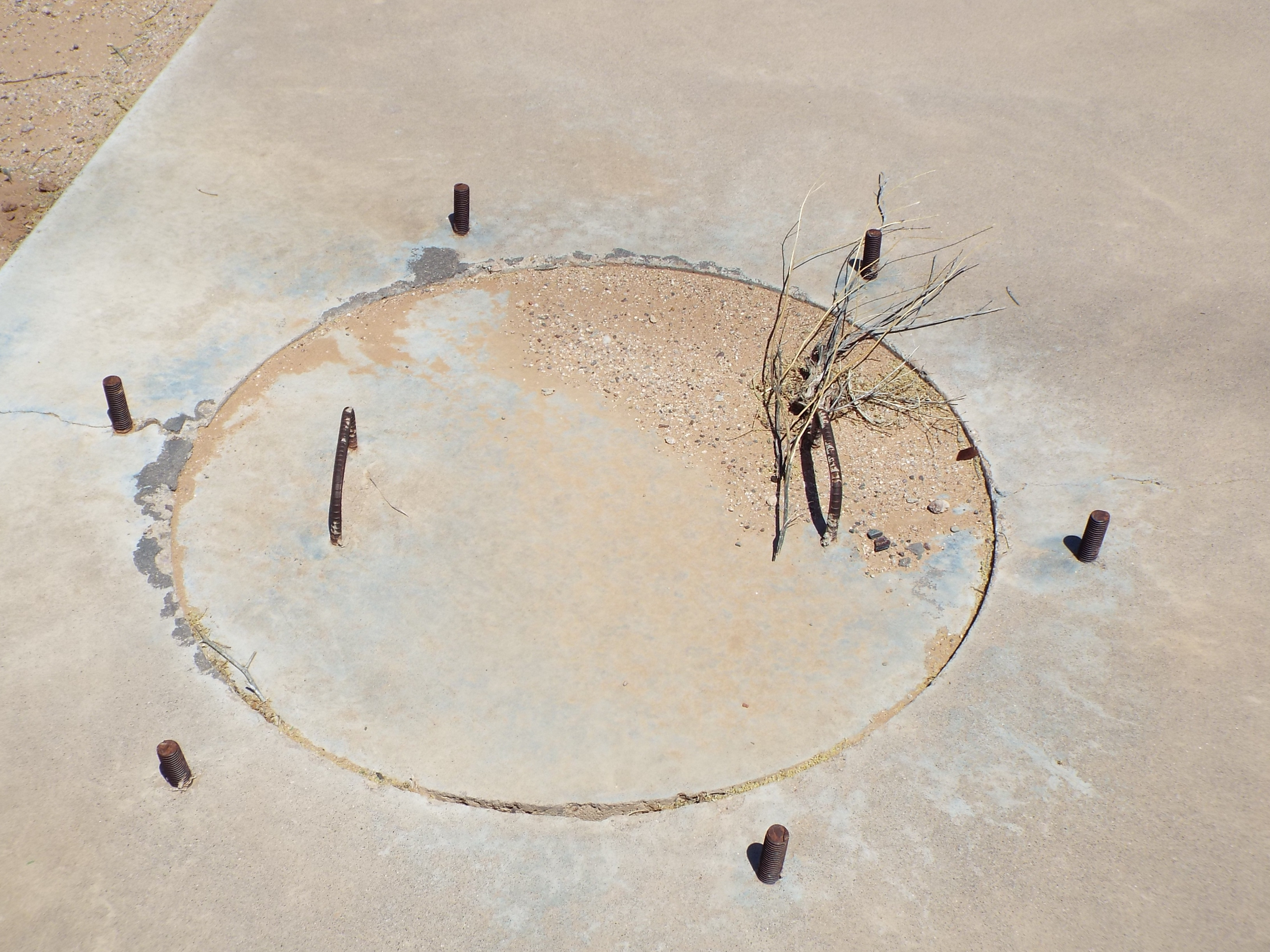
A close-up view of the first calibration target manhole, with cement cover and rebar handles. Around the cover protrude six equidistant pieces of rebar.

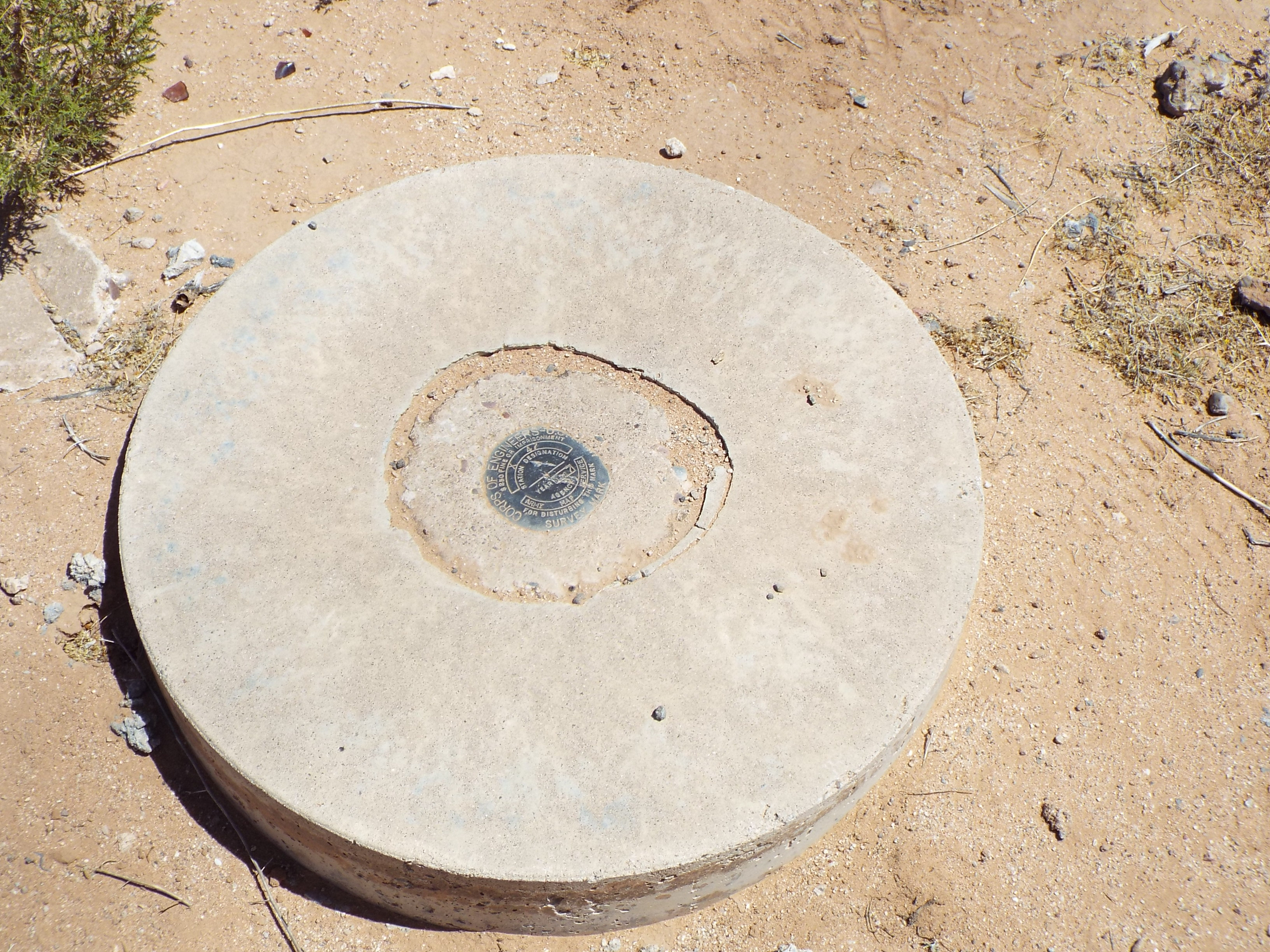
Close-up view of the first calibration target US Corps of Engineers 1967 survey mark.

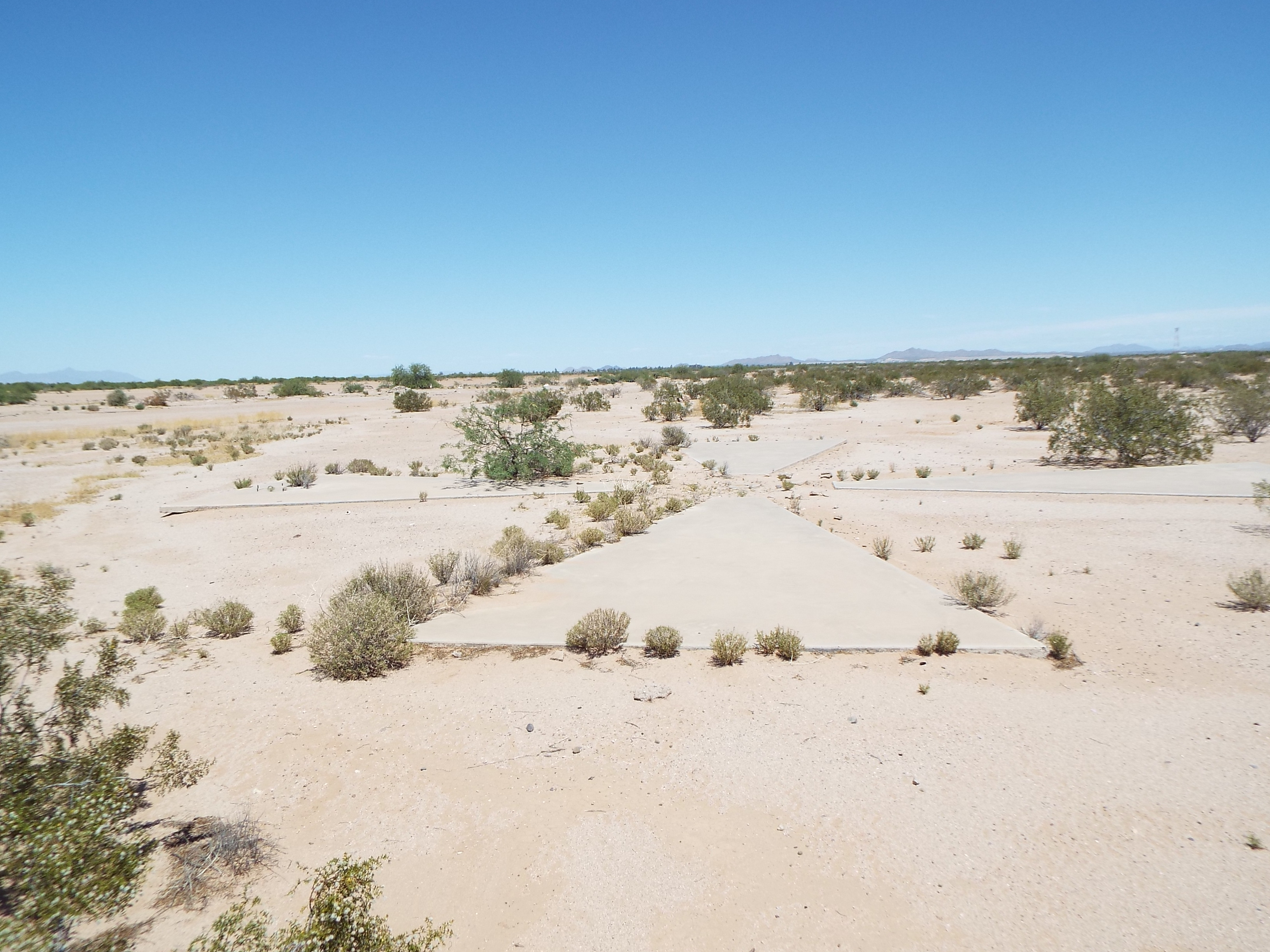
The second calibration target is located on the northeast corner of West Cornman Road and Carmel Blvd.

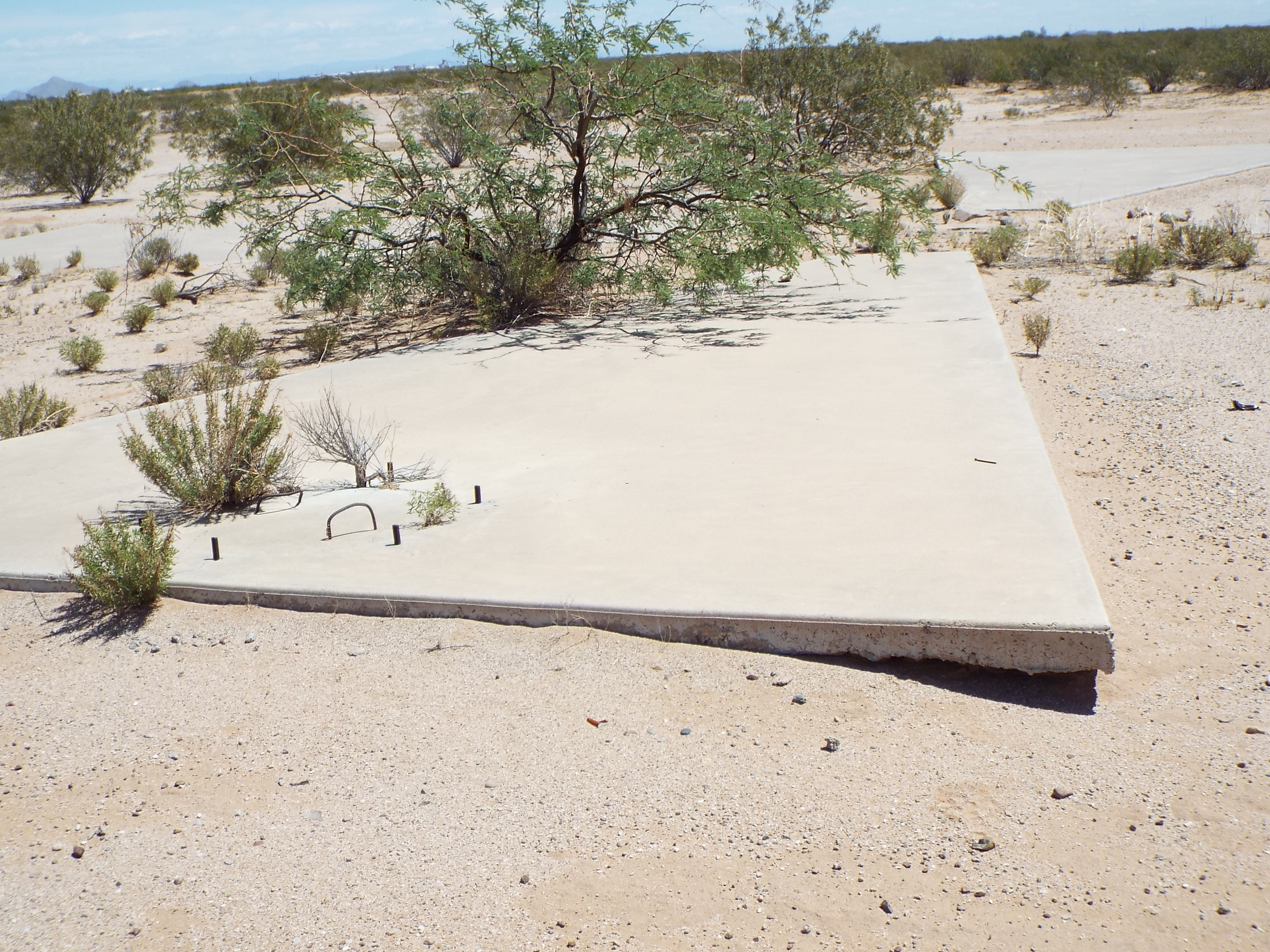
The calibration target manhole cover.

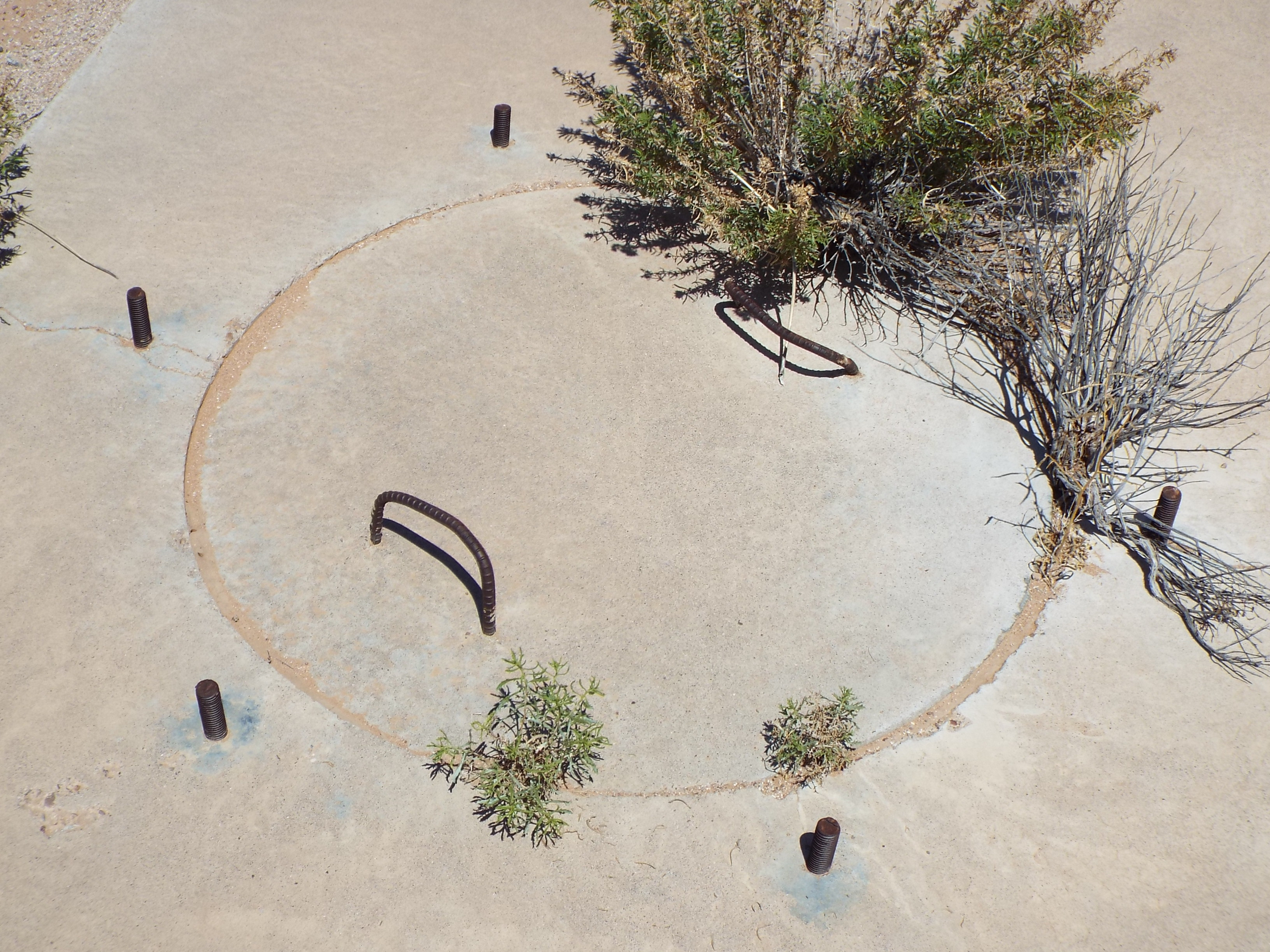
Close-up view of the second calibration target manhole cover. Around the cover protrude six equidistant pieces of rebar.

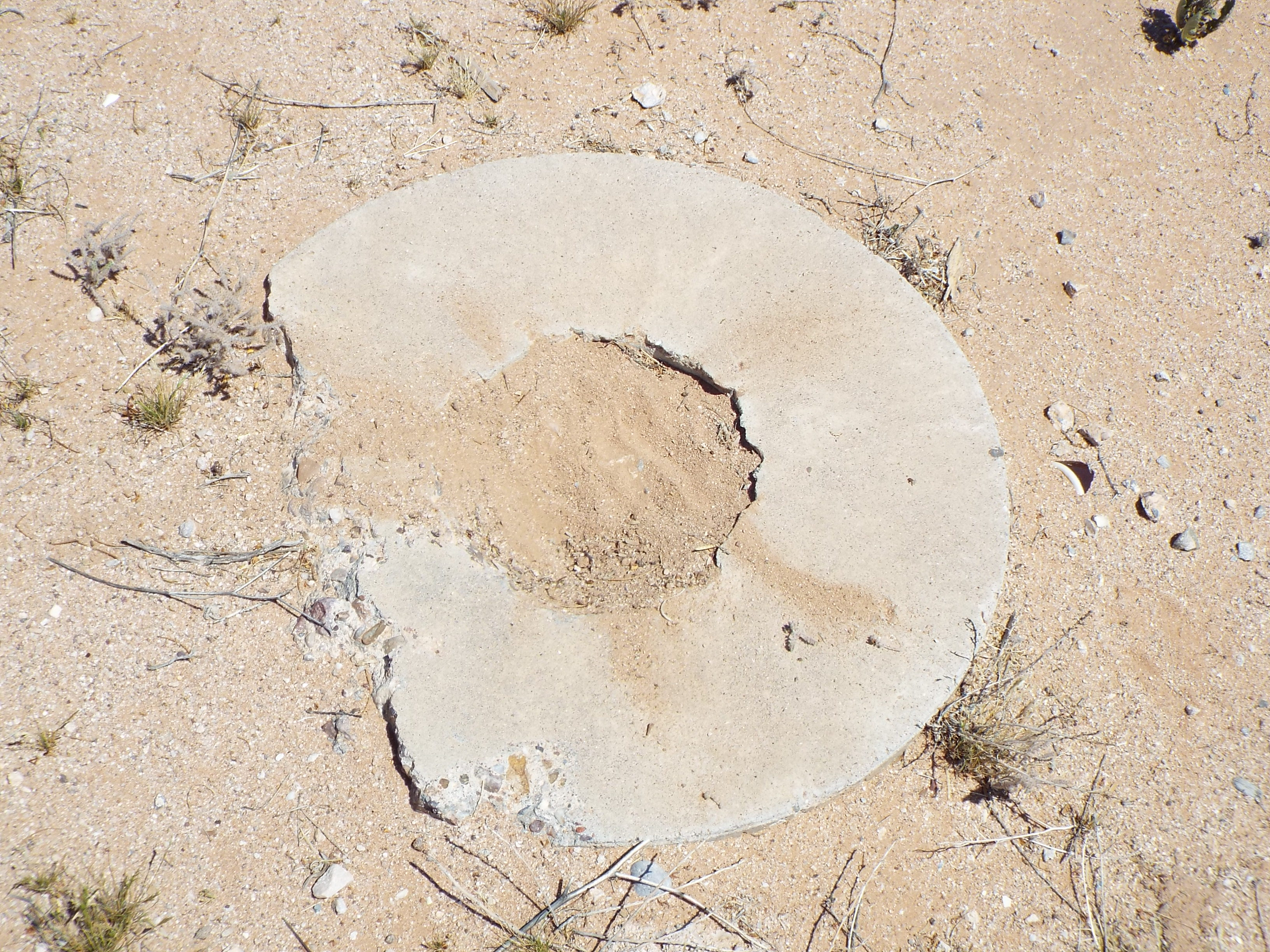
The survey mark of the US Corps of Engineers was once located here.

== See also ==
- Transcontinental Airway System

== Links ==
Candy CORN: analyzing the CORONA concrete crosses myth *

- All Corona Satellite Calibration Targets - Google map of the locations of all targets, identified as Present, Damaged, or Missing.
- Remaining Corona Satellite Calibration Targets — Google map of 145 remaining markers which formed a grid, used from 1959 to 1972 to calibrate the Corona spy satellite cameras, by Andrei Conovaloff, 2018.
- 3 online reports, Arizona Republic, July 2, 2016. — "Corona spy satellite timeline"; "How Casa Grande crosses calibrated spy-satellite camera"; "How Casa Grande crosses helped fight the Cold War".
- NPR, National Public Radio, October 11, 2016. - "Decades-Old Mystery Put To Rest: Why Are There X's In The Desert?"
- All points in OpenStreetMap
