= Vista Grande High School =

Location
- 1556 N. Arizola Road; Casa Grande, Arizona 85122; United States; 32°53′24″N 111°42′40″W

Information
- School type: Public high school
- Established: 2009 (17 years ago)
- School district: Casa Grande Union High School District
- CEEB code: 030081
- Principal: Kevin Hubbard
- Teaching staff: 81.20 (FTE)
- Grades: 9-12
- Enrollment: 1,932 (2023–2024)
- Student to teacher ratio: 23.79
- Colors: Black and gold
- Mascot: Spartans
- Website: vghs.cguhsd.org/o/vghs

Vista Grande High School is a high school in Casa Grande, Arizona, United States, started in 2009. It is part of the Casa Grande Union High School District.

It was opened to relieve continuing enrollment growth at Casa Grande Union High School, which had swelled to over 3,300 students and become Arizona's largest single-campus high school during the mid-2000s as the town it served exploded in population. Ground was broken in 2007 on the 259,000 square feet (24,100 m^{2}) of space on the 60-acre (24 ha) campus.
