= Ehrmann Commonwealth Dairy =

Yogurt production company

Coordinates: 42.8272°N 72.5780°W

Commonwealth Dairy, LLC, formally known as Ehrmann Commonwealth Dairy, LLC is a Vermont food company that produces yogurt and other products in United States facilities for sale under its own brand and for relabeling by other retailers. It is a wholly owned subsidiary of Lactalis US Yogurt Holding, Inc.

== History ==
The company was founded as a partnership between Thomas Moffit and Benjamin Johnson, who formed the company after seeing strong demand for yogurt while working in the food service industry. They began searching for partners and funding for the project in 2008, and entered into a joint venture with Ehrmann in September 2009. In March 2010, with investment from Ehrmann, state and federal funding, and tax incentives from the state of Vermont, the company broke ground on a $32 million processing facility in Brattleboro, Vermont. The plant began production in March 2011.

In November 2012, Ehrmann Commonwealth began a $12 million expansion at the Brattleboro plant, increasing its size by 23,000 square feet (2,100 m^{2}) from the original 39,000 square feet (3,600 m^{2}). The project was completed in June 2013, increasing the workforce at the facility from 110 to over 140. For 2013, the company's estimated revenue was $70 million.

In October 2013, the company opened a second yogurt production plant in Casa Grande, Arizona, under the name Ehrmann Arizona Dairy, LLC. Constructed at a cost of $50 million and employing 110 people, the facility was built to distribute products to West Coast markets, while providing capacity to expand into the central United States.

In December 2016, Ehrmann Commonwealth announced a second expansion project in Brattleboro, relocating administrative offices in the production facility and other areas into a new central headquarters building to allow added manufacturing space in the existing plant. The $2 million project was partially financed by public funding, including $1 million from the Windham County Economic Development program and various indirect incentives from local and state governments.

In July 2019, Ehrmann Commonwealth Dairy, LLC and Ehrmann Arizona Dairy, LLC were purchased by the French based food company, The Groupe Lactalis and renamed Commonwealth Dairy, LLC and Casa Grande Dairy Products, LLC, respectively.

== Products ==
Commonwealth Dairy, LLC and Casa Grande Dairy Products, LLC produces yogurt, quarg (or quark), and other dairy products under its in-house Green Mountain Creamery, Liebe, and Yo Yummy brands, as well as making yogurt for retailers to sell under their house brands. It also is a contract manufacturer for other brands that do not have production facilities. In 2016, the company produced around 75,000,000 pounds (34,000,000 kg) of yogurt. Its Green Mountain Creamery vanilla Greek yogurt was awarded first place prize at the 2012 World Dairy Expo Dairy Product Championship Contest, and the brand's maple Greek yogurt was named the International Dairy Food Association's most innovative product in 2013.
