= Ohio dairy industry =

Milk producing industry in Ohio, US

Dairy is a significant part of the overall agricultural production of the US state of Ohio. The state ranks 11th in milk production in the United States. In 2018, the roughly 2,000 dairy farms with 263,000 cows produced more than 5.59 billion pounds, or 650 million gallons, of milk.

== History ==
The first dairy cows came to what is now Ohio in the mid to late 18th century. Native Americans managed small cattle herds, which they acquired by trade or gift from Fort Detroit and by raiding frontier settlements in what is now Pennsylvania and Virginia.

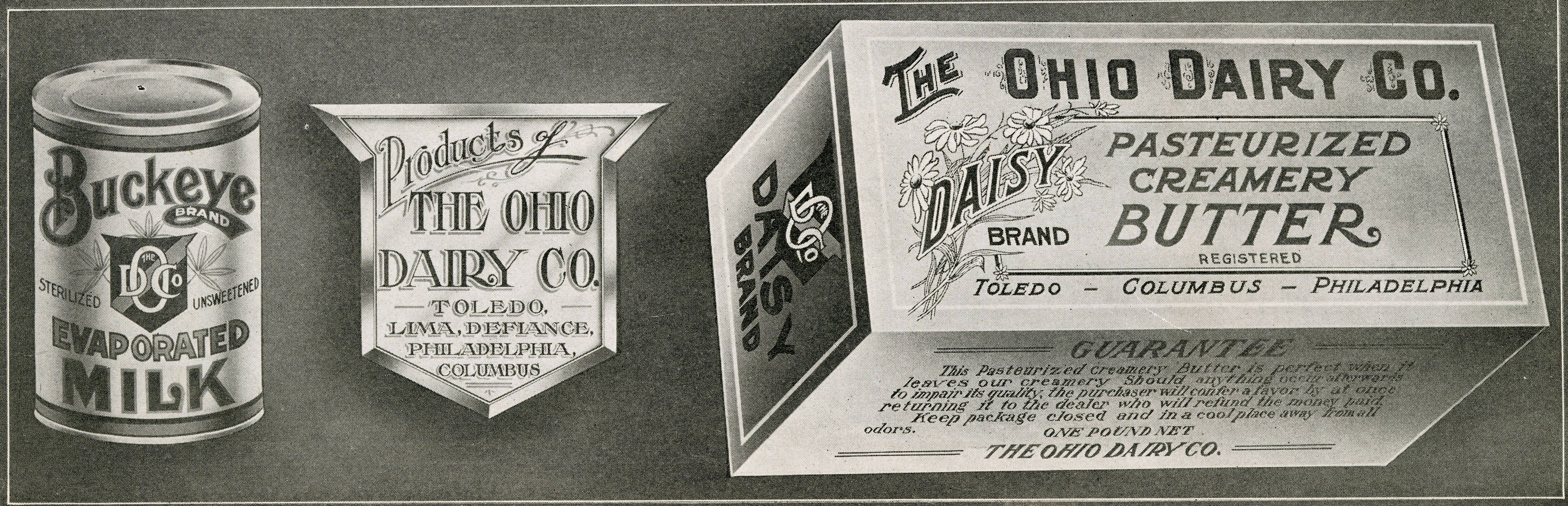
An advertisement for the Ohio Dairy Company in 1912

== Present day ==
The increasing growth of large, industrial dairy farms combined with low milk prices has led to the loss of many of Ohio's small family dairies.

Ohio lost nearly a quarter of its dairy farms from January 2017 to January 2019. The state went from 2,647 dairy farms to 2,045.

== Environmental impact ==
Large scale production of dairy in Ohio has had notable impacts on water and air quality in surrounding area, largely from cow manure. The dairy industry in Ohio produces around 23 million kilograms of manure daily as of 2016. Inside that manure is around 136,000 kg of nitrogen and 15,000 kg of phosphorus which often runs off and pollutes surrounding bodies of water such as Lake Erie.
