= Enosburgh, Vermont =

- Town
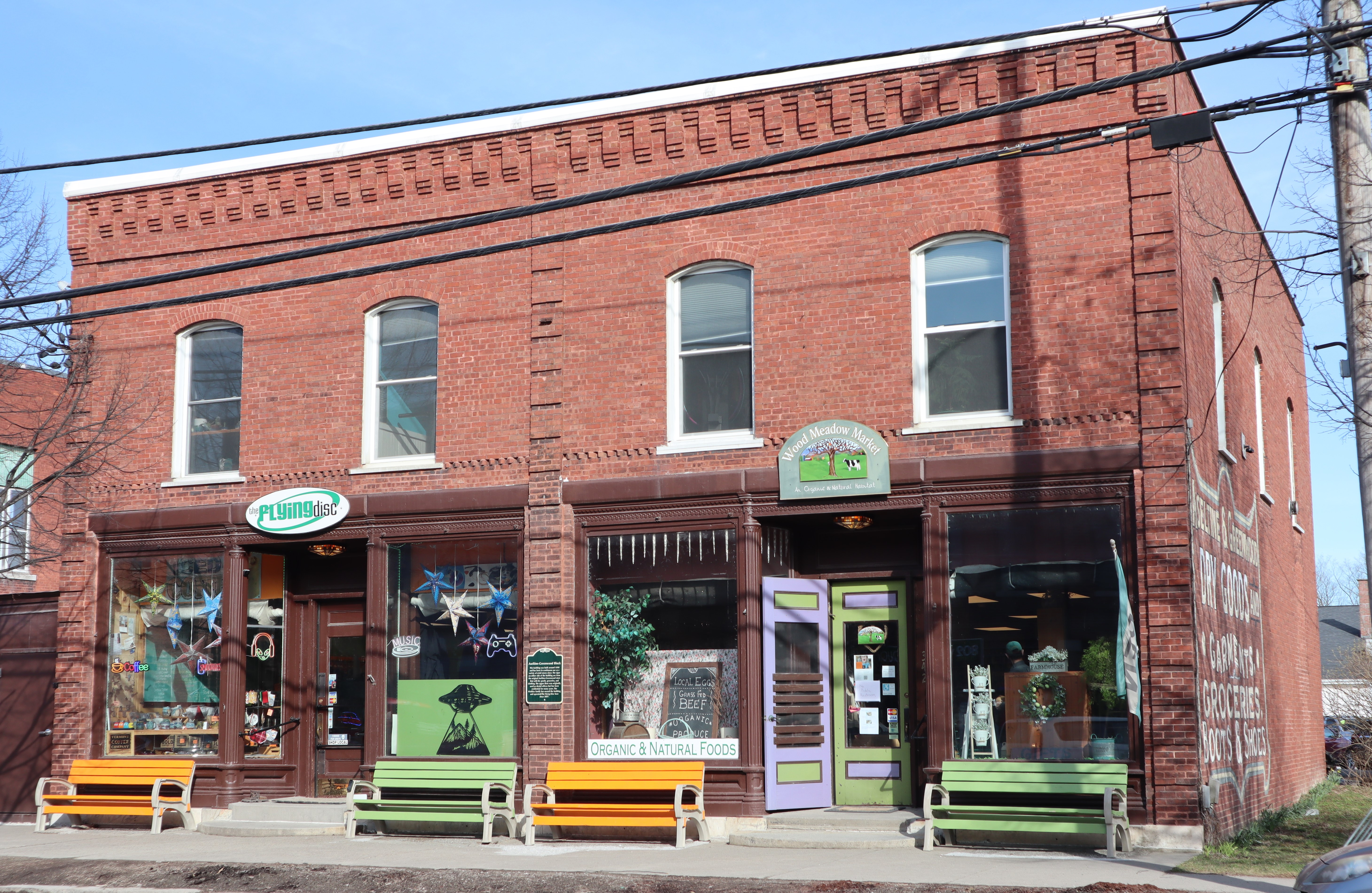
- Brick commercial building characteristic of Enosburgh

- Location in Franklin County and the state of Vermont
- Coordinates: 44°53′38″N 72°45′56″W
- Country: United States
- State: Vermont
- County: Franklin
- Communities: Enosburg Falls; Bordoville; East Enosburg; Enosburg Center; North Enosburg; Samsonville; West Enosburg

Area
  - Total: 48.7 sq mi (126.2 km^{2})
  - Land: 48.2 sq mi (124.9 km^{2})
  - Water: 0.50 sq mi (1.3 km^{2})
- Elevation: 751 ft (229 m)

Population (2020)
  - Total: 2,810
  - Density: 58/sq mi (22.5/km^{2})
- Time zone: UTC-5 (Eastern (EST))
  - Summer (DST): UTC-4 (EDT)
- ZIP Codes: 05450 (Enosburg Falls); 05476 (Richford)
- Area code: 802
- FIPS code: 50-23875
- GNIS feature ID: 1462090
- Website: www.enosburghvermont.org

Enosburgh /ˈiːnəsbɜːrɡ/ is a town in Franklin County, Vermont, in the United States. The population was 2,810 at the 2020 census. Enosburgh includes the village of Enosburg Falls and the settlements of Bordoville, East Enosburgh, North Enosburgh, Sampsonville, West Enosburgh, and Enosburgh Center. Enosburgh was named for Roger Enos, who had been a commander of all the Vermont Forces in the American Revolution. He was also the father-in-law of Ira Allen, founder of Vermont. The spelling of Enosburgh differs from the spelling of Enosburg Falls.

The town is a commercial center for the eastern half of Franklin County. It has several stores, restaurants, gas stations, and pharmacies.

== Geography ==
The Town of Enosburgh is located in eastern Franklin County. The village of Enosburg Falls is in the northwest corner of the town, and on the Missisquoi River. This flows west to Lake Champlain.

According to the United States Census Bureau, the town has a total area of 48.7 square miles (126.2 km^{2}), of which 48.2 square miles (124.9 km^{2}) is land and 0.50 square miles (1.3 km^{2}), or 1.00%, is water.

== Demographics ==
Historical population
Census	Pop.	Note	%±
1800	143		—
1810	704		392.3%
1820	932		32.4%
1830	1,560		67.4%
1840	2,022		29.6%
1850	2,009		−0.6%
1860	2,066		2.8%
1870	2,077		0.5%
1880	2,213		6.5%
1890	2,299		3.9%
1900	2,054		−10.7%
1910	2,212		7.7%
1920	2,231		0.9%
1930	2,093		−6.2%
1940	2,082		−0.5%
1950	2,101		0.9%
1960	1,966		−6.4%
1970	1,918		−2.4%
1980	2,070		7.9%
1990	2,535		22.5%
2000	2,788		10.0%
2010	2,781		−0.3%
2020	2,810		1.0%
U.S. Decennial Census

As of the census of 2000, there were 2,788 people, 1,058 households, and 727 families residing in the town. The population density was 57.4 people per square mile (22.2/km^{2}). There were 1,149 housing units at an average density of 23.7 per square mile (9.1/km^{2}). The racial makeup of the town was 95.80% White, 0.14% African American, 1.76% Native American, 0.29% Asian, 0.22% from other races, and 1.79% from two or more races. Hispanic or Latino of any race were 0.72% of the population.

There were 1,058 households, out of which 34.3% had children under the age of 18 living with them, 54.7% were married couples living together, 9.9% had a female householder with no husband present, and 31.2% were non-families. 24.4% of all households were made up of individuals, and 12.9% had someone living alone who was 65 years of age or older. The average household size was 2.60 and the average family size was 3.11.

In the town, the population was spread out, with 28.0% under the age of 18, 7.0% from 18 to 24, 27.6% from 25 to 44, 23.0% from 45 to 64, and 14.4% who were 65 years of age or older. The median age was 37 years. For every 100 females, there were 96.3 males. For every 100 females age 18 and over, there were 91.6 males.

The median income for a household in the town was $33,683, and the median income for a family was $38,958. Males had a median income of $29,625 versus $22,125 for females. The per capita income for the town was $16,281. About 8.3% of families and 11.4% of the population were below the poverty line, including 13.5% of those under age 18 and 13.8% of those age 65 or over.

== Education ==
It is in the Franklin Northeast Supervisory Union.

Enosburgh has an elementary school, a middle school, and a high school.

== Notable people ==
- Larry Gardner, Major League Baseball third baseman
- Susan Tolman Mills, co-founder of Mills College in Oakland, California
