= Rick & Janis Carnes =

American husband and wife country music duo

- Origin: Nashville, Tennessee, U.S.
- Genre: Country
- Years active: 1982-1984
- Labels: RCA Records; Elektra Records; Warner Bros. Records; MCA Records
- Past members: Rick Carnes; Janis Carnes

Rick & Janis Carnes are an American husband-and-wife singer-songwriter duo consisting of Rick Carnes (born June 30, 1950, in Fayetteville, Arkansas) and Janis Carnes (born May 21, 1947, in Shelbyville, Tennessee).

== History ==
They were married in 1973 before moving to Nashville, Tennessee in 1978. Janis was signed to RCA Records in 1980 as a solo artist before her and Rick signed with Elektra Records in 1982. They later signed with Warner Bros. Records and had a minor hit with "Does He Ever Mention My Name", which peaked at No. 32.

After being dropped from Warner, they were signed to MCA Records but were later dropped. The couple have since continued working as songwriters, and their songs have been recorded by artists including J.C. Jones, Reba McEntire, Steve Wariner and Garth Brooks.

== Discography ==
=== Singles ===
Year	Single	Peak positions
Year	Single	US Country
1982	"Have You Heard"	67
1983	"Poor Girl"	51
1983	"Does He Ever Mention My Name"	32
1984	"Long Lost Causes"	74
