= Alaska dairy industry =

Dairy is a small part of the overall agricultural production of the U.S. state of Alaska. As of 2020, the state has one dairy.

== History ==
From 1869 to 1965, there were over 12 dairies in the agricultural region around Juneau. The farms were operated by people who had come from the lower 48 states as well as by immigrants from Europe.

During the Presidency of Franklin Roosevelt, the federal government sent more than 200 families to the Matanuska Valley to farm, establishing the Matanuska Valley Colony in and around Palmer. Many of these families started dairy operations. In the Matanuska Valley, the Alaska Railroad ran a creamery from 1927 to 1932. In the early 1940's, the establishment of air service into southeast Alaska allowed the direct importation of fresh milk. This made Alaska dairying lose a great deal of its profitability. In 1959, there were 525 dairy farms in the state. From 1964 to 1980, the state's cattle population and milk production decreased. This was partially due to urban pressure from Anchorage on the valley. Milk production value began rising in the early 1970's, and rose over $7 million from 1984 to 1986 (adjusted for inflation). The Trans-Alaska Pipeline was starting to be constructed at this time, and as the value of other farm products rose, it's likely that Alaskans were investing in local industries. In 1988, the dairy industry's receipts represented 21% of all farm receipts in the state.

In 2019, in governor Mike Dunleavy's proposed budget, he eliminated the funding for the state’s only dairy inspector, which would force the closure of the states last commercial dairy- Havemeister Dairy in Palmer, Alaska. On October 8, 2021, Havemeister Dairy shut down.

== See also ==
- Agriculture in Alaska
- Creamer's Field Migratory Waterfowl Refuge
