= Enosburg Falls, Vermont =

- Village
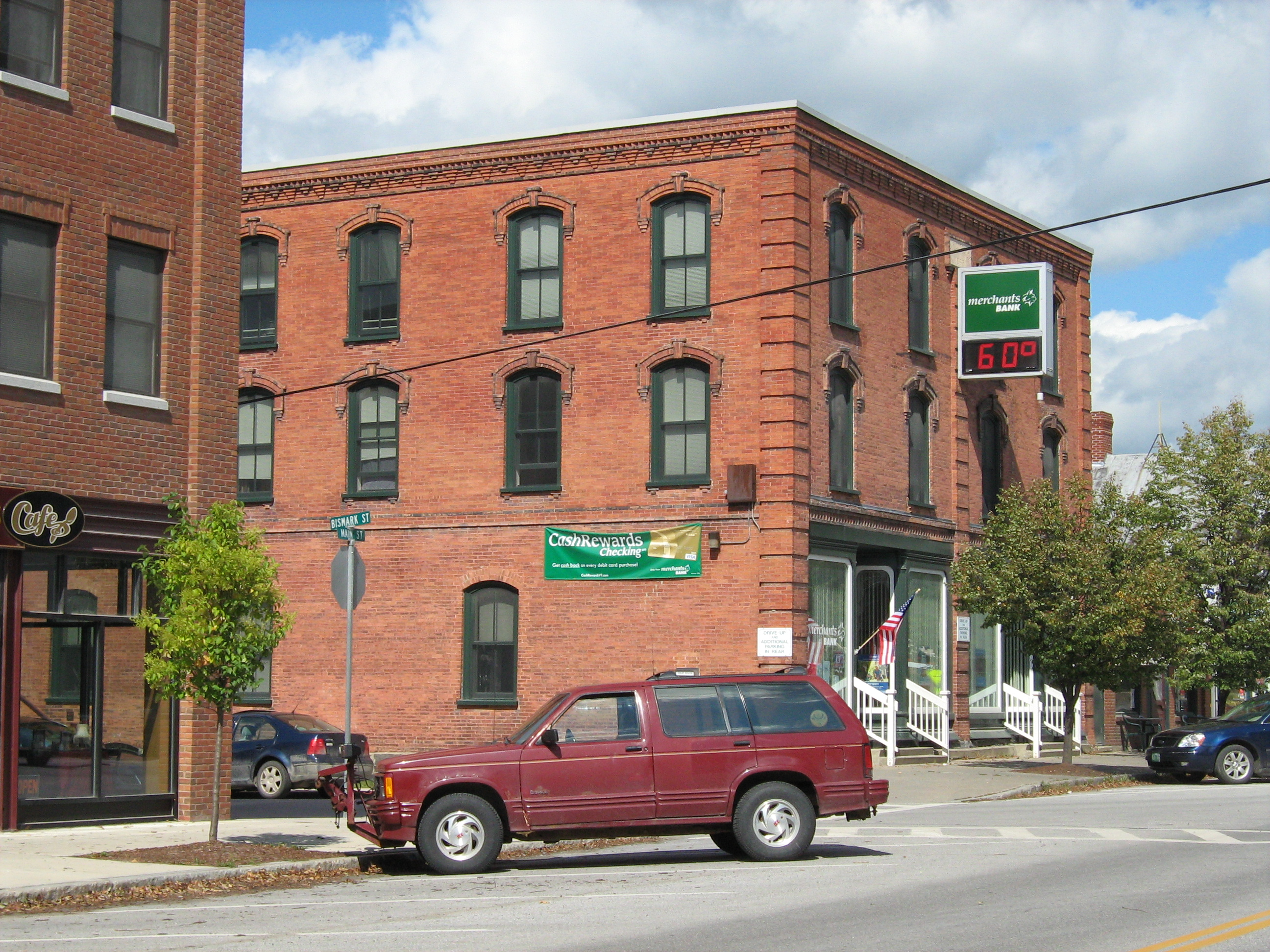
- Billado Block

- Location in Franklin County and the state of Vermont
- Coordinates: 44°54′30″N 72°48′09″W
- Country: United States
- State: Vermont
- County: Franklin
- Town: Enosburgh

Area
  - Total: 3.67 sq mi (9.50 km^{2})
  - Land: 3.57 sq mi (9.24 km^{2})
  - Water: 0.10 sq mi (0.26 km^{2})
- Elevation: 427 ft (130 m)

Population (2020)
  - Total: 1,356
  - Density: 380/sq mi (147/km^{2})
- Time zone: UTC-5 (Eastern (EST))
  - Summer (DST): UTC-4 (EDT)
- ZIP code: 05450
- Area code: 802
- FIPS code: 50-24025
- GNIS feature ID: 2378305
- Website: villageofenosburgfalls.org

Enosburg Falls is a village in the town of Enosburgh in Franklin County, Vermont, in the United States. The population was 1,356 at the 2020 census.

== Geography ==
The village is located in the northwest corner of the town of Enosburgh along the Missisquoi River and its falls. The village center is north of the river, but the village limits extend south of the river as well. Vermont Routes 105 and 108 pass through the village together as Main Street. Route 105 leads northeast 10 miles (16 km) to Richford and southwest 18 miles (29 km) to St. Albans, the Franklin County seat. Route 108 leads north 8 miles (13 km) to the West Berkshire Border Crossing at the Canada–United States border north of East Franklin and south 20 miles (32 km) to Jeffersonville.

According to the United States Census Bureau, the village has a total area of 3.7 square miles (9.5 km^{2}), of which 3.6 square miles (9.2 km^{2}) is land and 0.1 square miles (0.3 km^{2}), or 2.77%, is water.

=== Climate ===
This climatic region is typified by large seasonal temperature differences, with warm to hot (and often humid) summers and cold (sometimes severely cold) winters. According to the Köppen Climate Classification system, Enosburg Falls has a humid continental climate, abbreviated "Dfb" on climate maps.

Climate data for Enosburg Falls 2, Vermont 1991–2020 normals, 1993-2020 snowfall: 425ft (130m)
Month	Jan	Feb	Mar	Apr	May	Jun	Jul	Aug	Sep	Oct	Nov	Dec	Year
Record high °F (°C)	59 (15)	71 (22)	82 (28)	88 (31)	97 (36)	103 (39)	97 (36)	95 (35)	94 (34)	85 (29)	83 (28)	67 (19)	103 (39)
Mean maximum °F (°C)	48 (9)	52 (11)	60 (16)	79 (26)	87 (31)	90 (32)	91 (33)	90 (32)	87 (31)	77 (25)	67 (19)	53 (12)	90 (32)
Mean daily maximum °F (°C)	26.9 (−2.8)	30.3 (−0.9)	39.6 (4.2)	54.4 (12.4)	68.2 (20.1)	75.7 (24.3)	81.0 (27.2)	80.4 (26.9)	73.2 (22.9)	58.7 (14.8)	45.3 (7.4)	33.2 (0.7)	55.6 (13.1)
Daily mean °F (°C)	15.2 (−9.3)	16.6 (−8.6)	27.3 (−2.6)	41.9 (5.5)	54.3 (12.4)	62.9 (17.2)	68.1 (20.1)	67.0 (19.4)	59.6 (15.3)	47.2 (8.4)	35.1 (1.7)	23.9 (−4.5)	43.3 (6.3)
Mean daily minimum °F (°C)	3.5 (−15.8)	2.9 (−16.2)	15.0 (−9.4)	29.4 (−1.4)	40.4 (4.7)	50.1 (10.1)	55.3 (12.9)	53.5 (11.9)	46.0 (7.8)	35.7 (2.1)	25.0 (−3.9)	14.5 (−9.7)	30.9 (−0.6)
Mean minimum °F (°C)	−24 (−31)	−19 (−28)	−10 (−23)	16 (−9)	26 (−3)	37 (3)	45 (7)	42 (6)	31 (−1)	22 (−6)	6 (−14)	−11 (−24)	−26 (−32)
Record low °F (°C)	−38 (−39)	−33 (−36)	−31 (−35)	5 (−15)	24 (−4)	27 (−3)	40 (4)	37 (3)	20 (−7)	15 (−9)	−16 (−27)	−24 (−31)	−38 (−39)
Average precipitation inches (mm)	1.87 (47)	1.98 (50)	2.23 (57)	3.26 (83)	3.83 (97)	4.01 (102)	4.52 (115)	3.92 (100)	3.99 (101)	4.33 (110)	3.11 (79)	2.98 (76)	40.03 (1,017)
Average snowfall inches (cm)	15.7 (40)	17.0 (43)	14.1 (36)	3.3 (8.4)	trace	0.0 (0.0)	0.0 (0.0)	0.0 (0.0)	0.0 (0.0)	0.5 (1.3)	5.6 (14)	16.1 (41)	72.3 (183.7)
Source 1: NOAA
Source 2: XMACIS (snowfall, temp records & monthly max/mins)

== Demographics ==
Historical population
Census	Pop.	Note	%±
1890	974		—
1900	954		−2.1%
1910	1,153		20.9%
1920	1,236		7.2%
1930	1,195		−3.3%
1940	1,168		−2.3%
1950	1,289		10.4%
1960	1,321		2.5%
1970	1,266		−4.2%
1980	1,207		−4.7%
1990	1,350		11.8%
2000	1,473		9.1%
2010	1,329		−9.8%
2020	1,356		2.0%
U.S. Decennial Census

As of the census of 2000, there were 1,473 people, 591 households, and 378 families residing in the village. The population density was 414.0 people per square mile (159.8/km^{2}). There were 618 housing units at an average density of 173.7/sq mi (67.0/km^{2}). The racial makeup of the village was 96.81% White, 0.14% African American, 1.02% Native American, 0.20% Asian, 0.14% from other races, and 1.70% from two or more races. Hispanic or Latino of any race were 1.22% of the population. 36% reported French Canadian and French ancestry, 15% English, and 9% Irish.

There were 591 households, out of which 32.3% had children under the age of 18 living with them, 48.2% were married couples living together, 11.2% had a female householder with no husband present, and 36.0% were non-families. 30.6% of all households were made up of individuals, and 19.1% had someone living alone who was 65 years of age or older. The average household size was 2.44 and the average family size was 3.03.

In the village, the population was spread out, with 26.7% under the age of 18, 7.1% from 18 to 24, 25.3% from 25 to 44, 20.9% from 45 to 64, and 20.0% who were 65 years of age or older. The median age was 38 years. For every 100 females, there were 84.8 males. For every 100 females age 18 and over, there were 81.8 males.

The median income for a household in the village was $30,221, and the median income for a family was $37,813. Males had a median income of $30,395 versus $20,542 for females. The per capita income for the village was $15,195. About 8.0% of families and 12.2% of the population were below the poverty line, including 15.0% of those under age 18 and 16.9% of those age 65 or over.

== Arts and Culture ==
Enosburg Falls is the home of the Vermont Dairy Festival.

== Notable people ==
- Juan Babauta, former Governor of the Northern Mariana Islands
- Larry Gardner, third baseman with the three teams; born in Enosburg Falls (1886)
- Olin M. Jeffords, Chief Justice of the Vermont Supreme Court and father of Senator Jim Jeffords

== Education ==
It is in the Franklin Northeast Supervisory Union.

== In popular culture ==
Enosburg Falls is mentioned in the Ian Fleming short story "For Your Eyes Only". James Bond targets an antagonist in a house that is located outside the village.
