= Casa Grande Union High School =

Location
- 2730 N Trekell Road; Casa Grande, Arizona 85122; United States; 32°56′09″N 111°44′13″W

Information
- School type: Public high school
- Established: 1920 (106 years ago)
- School district: Casa Grande Union High School District
- CEEB code: 030040
- Principal: Frank Armenta
- Faculty: 91.00
- Grades: 9–12
- Enrollment: 1,970 (2023–2024)
- Student to teacher ratio: 21.65
- Colors: Blue and gold
- Mascot: Cougars
- Website: cghs.cguhsd.org

Casa Grande Union High School is a high school in Casa Grande, Arizona. It is part of the Casa Grande Union High School District.

The original high school and gym, now used as the Casa Grande City Hall, are listed on the National Register of Historic Places.

== History ==
- Casa Grande Union High School and Gymnasium
- U.S. National Register of Historic Places
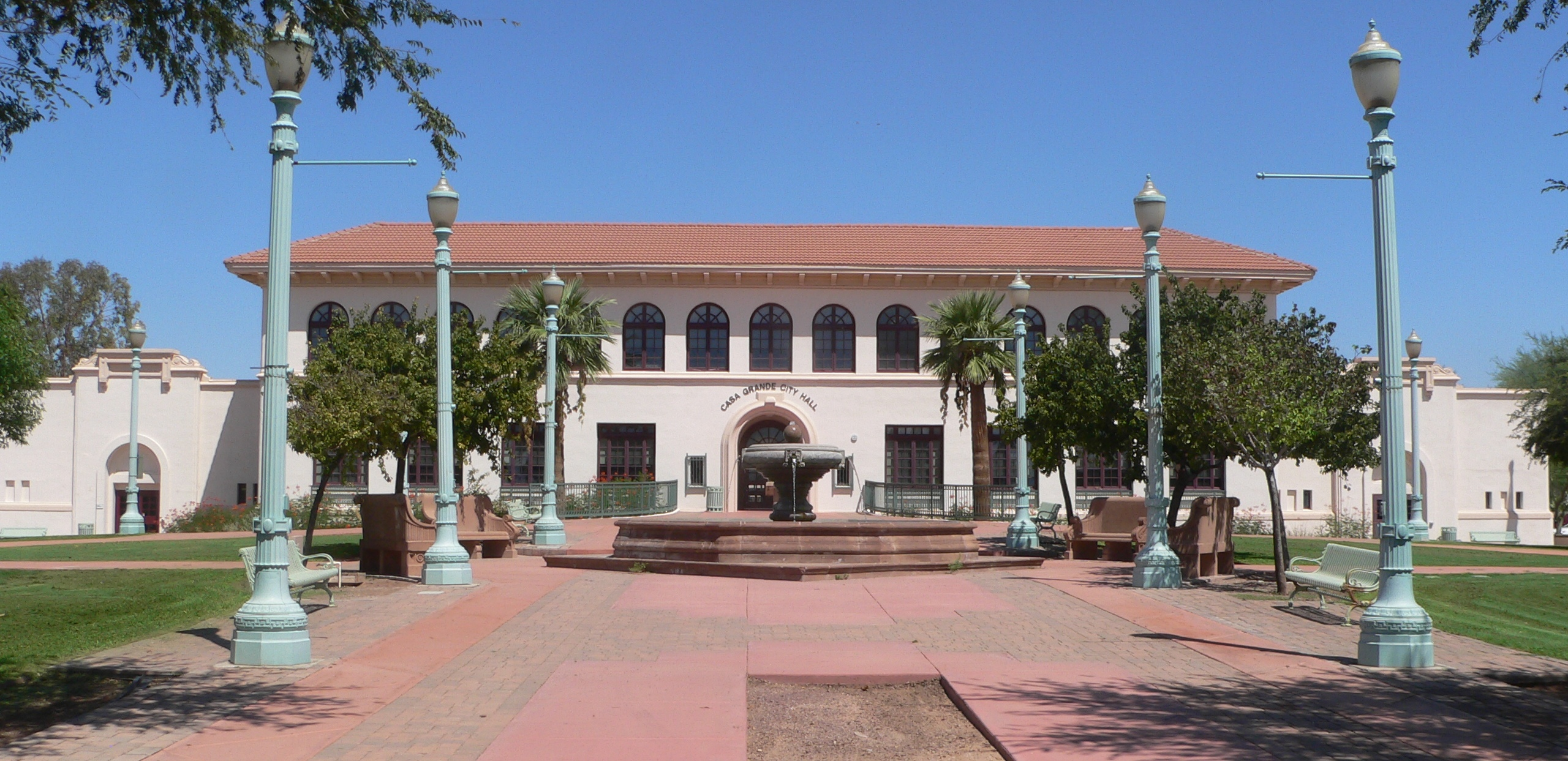
- Former high school, now Casa Grande city hall

- Location within Arizona Location within the United States
- Location: 510 E. Florence Blvd., Casa Grande, Arizona
- Coordinates: 32°52′49″N 111°44′52″W
- Area: 2.8 acres (1.1 ha)
- Built: 1920–1921; 1936
- Architects: Lyman & Place
- Architectural style: Mission/Spanish Revival
- MPS: Casa Grande MRA
- NRHP reference No.: 86000821
- Added to NRHP: February 3, 1986

The original Casa Grande Union High School was built in 1920–21 at a cost of $135,000. It featured an indoor swimming pool and an auditorium. The large building's construction was a major milestone for the growing town between Phoenix and Tucson.

The gymnasium was added in 1936. It is Arizona's only adobe gymnasium. $12,000 was used to build the structure ($7,200 of it came from the Depression-era Works Progress Administration). The adobe was locally made with on-site earth; manufacturing it provided much-needed jobs during the Depression in hard-hit Casa Grande. It was in use as the high school until 1997, when a new, modern school with the capacity to serve 2,800 students opened at a different location. This new school quickly filled up and now has 3,200 students as of 2022-2023.

== Academics ==
The academic departments that Casa Grande Union High offers include the following:

- English
- Mathematics
- World Languages
- Mathematics
- Fine Arts
- Science
- Social Sciences
- Exceptional Student Services
- CTE (Career and Technical Education)

=== Band ===
In 2015, 2016, 2017, 2018, and 2019 the Casa Grande Indoor Percussion Ensemble were the Percussion Scholastic Open State Champions. Scholastic Open is the highest competing High School drumline division in Arizona. Additionally, the Pride of Casa Grande Marching Band ended the 2023 season Division 4A Champion at 3A/4A Class Championships. The Milton B. Nunamaker award was also awarded to the group in 2018 and 2023.

== See also ==
- List of historic properties in Casa Grande, Arizona
