= Casa Grande Elementary School District =

School district in Arizona, United States

Address
- 220 West Kortsen Road CASA GRANDE, Arizona, 85122; United States

District information
- Type: Public
- Grades: PreK–8
- NCES District ID: 0401710

Students and staff
- Students: 6,161
- Teachers: 302.13
- Staff: 477.23
- Student–teacher ratio: 20.39

Other information
- Website: www.cgesd.org

Casa Grande School District 4 is a school district in Pinal County, Arizona, that serves over 7,000 students in 13 schools. The school district has received six A+ awards from the Arizona Educational Foundation since 2007.
