= Casa Grande Union High School District =

School district in Arizona, United States

Address
- 2730 North Trekell Road Casa Grande, Arizona, 85122; United States

District information
- Type: Public
- Grades: 9–12
- NCES District ID: 0401740

Students and staff
- Students: 3,610
- Teachers: 155.8
- Staff: 172.44
- Student–teacher ratio: 23.17

Other information
- Website: www.cguhsd.org

The Casa Grande Union High School District is the high school district for Casa Grande, Arizona. It operates Casa Grande Union and Vista Grande high schools, which each have some 1,650 students.
