= South Branch Trout River =

Location
- Country: United States
- State: Vermont
- County: Lamoille County, Franklin County, Vermont

Physical characteristics
- Source: Unidentified Lake
  - location: Lamoille County
  - coordinates: 44.797°N 72.624°W
- Mouth: Trout River
  - location: Montgomery
  - coordinates: 44.878°N 72.612°W
- Length: 6.0 km (3.7 mi)

Basin features
- Progression: Trout River, Missisquoi River, Lake Champlain (via Missisquoi Bay), Richelieu River, Saint Lawrence River
- Tributaries
  - left: (upstream) Unidentified brook, discharge of a lake, unidentified brook, Tamarack Brook, 6 unidentified brooks.
  - right: (upstream) 7 unidentified brook, Pacific Brook, 2 unidentified brooks.

The South Branch Trout River is a tributary of the Trout River, flowing successively in Belvidere and in Montgomery, in Lamoille County and in Franklin County, in northern Vermont in the United States.

The valley of the South Branch Trout River is served by South Main Street (VT 118) passing on the eastern shore of the river.

The surface of the South Branch Trout River is usually frozen from mid-December to mid-March, except the rapids areas; however, safe circulation on the ice is generally from late December to early March.

== Course ==
The South Branch Trout River rises at an unidentified Lake (length: 0.35 km (0.22 mi); altitude: 414.5 m (1,360 ft) ) in Lamoille County. This lake is encased between the mountains.

From its source, the South Branch Trout River flows over 6.0 kilometres (3.7 mi) mainly in forested and mountainous, and following more or less the route 118, with a drop of , according to the following segments:

- 0.7 kilometres (0.43 mi) towards north in a deep valley of Lamoille County, entering in Franklin, up to an unidentified brook (coming from south-west);
- 1.8 kilometres (1.1 mi) towards north in a deep valley, following more or less the route route 118, collecting two brooks from east and three from west, up to Pacific Brook (coming from east);
- 1.4 kilometres (0.87 mi) towards the north, forming a hook to the west and a loop to the east near Hectorville, collecting three brooks from east and three from east, up to Tamarack Brook (coming from southwest);
- 2.1 kilometres (1.3 mi) towards the north going forming a loop towards east before Hutchins Bridge Road, collecting three brooks from east and one brook from east, up to the mouth.

The mouth of the Trout River is emptying on the southwest shore of Trout River on the south side of Montgomery Center. From there, the current goes generally northwest on 9.1 km (5.7 mi) following the Trout River; then, westward on 66.3 km (41.2 mi) up to eastern shore of Lake Champlain.

== Toponymy ==
The toponym "South Branch Trout River" was registered on October 29, 1980 in the USGS (US Geological Survey).

== See also ==
- List of rivers of Vermont
