= Hutchins Covered Bridge =

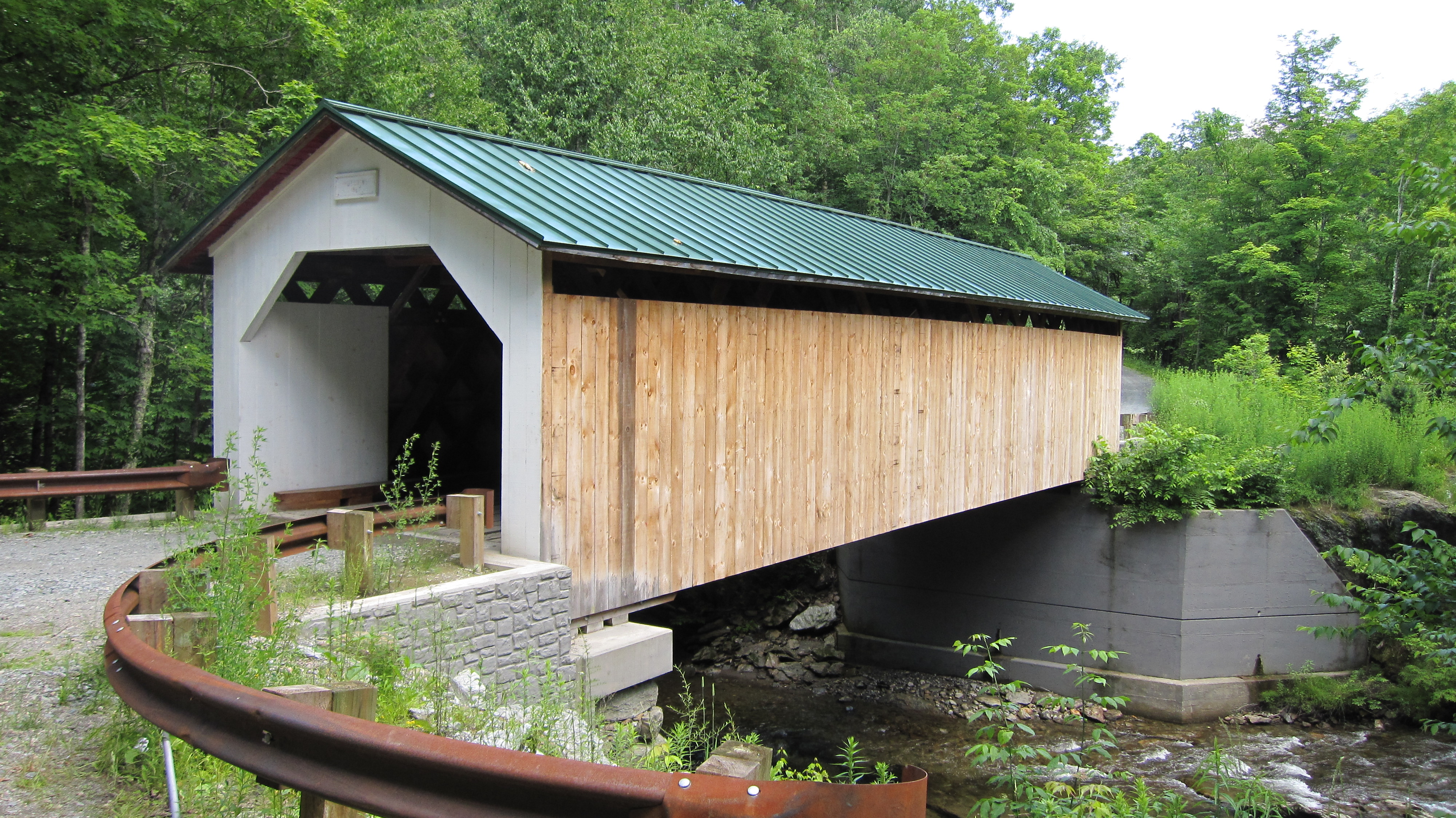
- Bridge in U.S. state of Vermont
- Coordinates: 44°51′31″N 72°36′45″W
- Carries: Hutchins Bridge Road
- Crosses: South Branch of Trout River
- Locale: Montgomery, Vermont
- Maintained by: Town of Montgomery
- ID number: VT-06-07

Characteristics
- Design: Covered, Town lattice
- Material: Wood
- Total length: 76 ft 11.5 in (23.46 m)
- Width: 16 ft 0 in (4.88 m)
- No. of spans: 1
- Clearance above: 11 ft 4 in (3.45 m)

History
- Constructed by: Sheldon and Savannah Jewett
- Construction end: 1883
- Hutchins Covered Bridge
- U.S. National Register of Historic Places
- Location within Vermont Location within the United States
- Coordinates: 44.85857°N 72.61256°W
- Area: 1 acre (0.4 ha)
- NRHP reference No.: 74000219
- Added to NRHP: December 30, 1974

The Hutchins Covered Bridge is a wooden covered bridge that crosses the South Branch of the Trout River in Montgomery, Vermont on Hutchins Bridge Road. It was built in 1883 by Sheldon & Savannah Jewett, brothers who are credited with building most of the area's covered bridges. It was listed on the National Register of Historic Places in 1974.

== Description and history ==
The Hutchins Covered Bridge stands in what is now a rural area of central Montgomery, carrying the dead-end Hutchins Bridge Road over the South Branch Trout River a short way west of Vermont Route 118. It is a single-span Town lattice truss, 77 feet (23 m) long and 19.5 feet (5.9 m) wide, with a roadway width of 16 feet (4.9 m) (one lane). It has a metal gable roof, and its exterior is clad in vertical board siding, which extends around to the interior of the portals. The siding stops short of the roof eaves, leaving an open strip. The bridge deck is wood planking, and the abutments consist of dry-laid stone blocks; those at one end are laid on a large stone outcrop.

The bridge was completed in 1883 by the Jewett Brothers, who operated a sawmill in Montgomery's West Hill area. They prepared the wood for the bridges at their sawmill. The brothers are credited with building seven area surviving covered bridges, distinctive in Vermont as the highest concentration of bridges in the state with a single attributed builder.

Like the nearby West Hill Covered Bridge, the Hutchins bridge was located in a bustling area at one time. Although it served a dead-end road, a butter tub company was situated there and used the bridge frequently. Also like the West Hill bridge, activity slackened and the bridge was essentially abandoned, falling into serious disrepair. At one time, large steel beams were installed below the deck, and tied to even larger beams running through the bridge over the deck to prevent it from falling into the river below. In 2009 it was reconstructed by Alpine Construction of Schuylerville, New York (the same company that rebuilt the West Hill bridge). Today the bridge shares another commonality with the West Hill bridge: the approach road is little more than a one lane gravel drive. A series of articles chronicling the work can be found at the Vermont Covered Bridges web site.

== See also ==
- List of covered bridges in Vermont
- National Register of Historic Places listings in Franklin County, Vermont
- List of bridges on the National Register of Historic Places in Vermont
