= Hectorville Covered Bridge =

- U.S. National Register of Historic Places
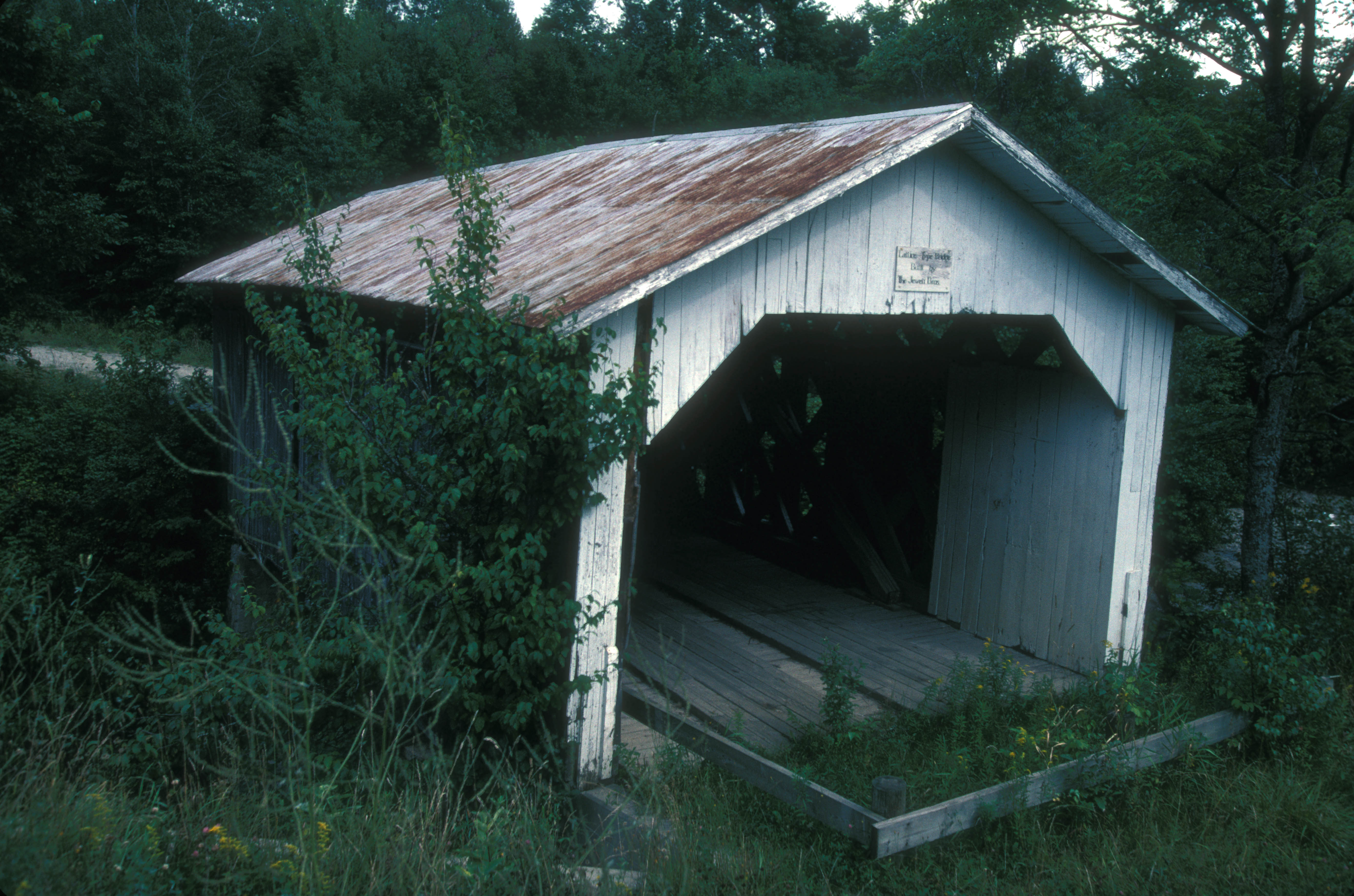
- The bridge in 1970

- Location within Vermont Location within the United States
- Location: Originally on Gibou Rd., Montgomery, Vermont
- Coordinates: 44°51′13″N 72°36′50″W
- Area: 1 acre (0.40 ha)
- Built: 1860
- Built by: Jewett, Sheldon & Savannah
- Architectural style: Town lattice truss
- NRHP reference No.: 74000217
- Added to NRHP: November 20, 1974

The Hectorville Covered Bridge is a historic covered bridge in Montgomery, Vermont. Originally located on Gibou Road off Vermont Route 118 in central Montgomery, the bridge is currently (2016) in storage. It was built by Sheldon & Savannah Jewett, who are credited with building all of Montgomery's surviving 19th century covered bridges. It was listed on the National Register of Historic Places in 1974.

== Description and history ==
The Hectorville Covered Bridge consists of two Town lattice trusses, 52.5 feet (16.0 m) long, with a structure width of 19.5 feet (5.9 m) and a roadway width of 16 feet (4.9 m) (one lane). The bridge's exterior is clad in vertical board siding, and it is covered by a metal gable roof. The siding extends a short way into the portals to shelter the truss ends. The bridge decking consists of wooden planking on wooden stringers. When situated across the Trout River on Gibou Road, it sat on irregularly laid stone abutments faced in concrete.

The bridge's construction date is not known. It is known to have been built by the town's Jewett brothers, who are credited with building Montgomery's other surviving covered bridges. This assemblage is one of the most concentrated in Vermont all attributable to a single builder. The Jewetts used standardized dimensions for their construction (except for the bridge length), and prepared wood for the bridges at their lumberyard in Montgomery's West Hill area. The bridge was originally located in Montgomery Center, and was relocated to the Gibou Road location in the early 1900s. As of 2003, the bridge was reported to be in a local construction yard, awaiting repairs and a determination by the town of where to place it.

== See also ==
- List of covered bridges in Vermont
- National Register of Historic Places listings in Franklin County, Vermont
- List of bridges on the National Register of Historic Places in Vermont
