= Sheldon & Savannah Jewett =

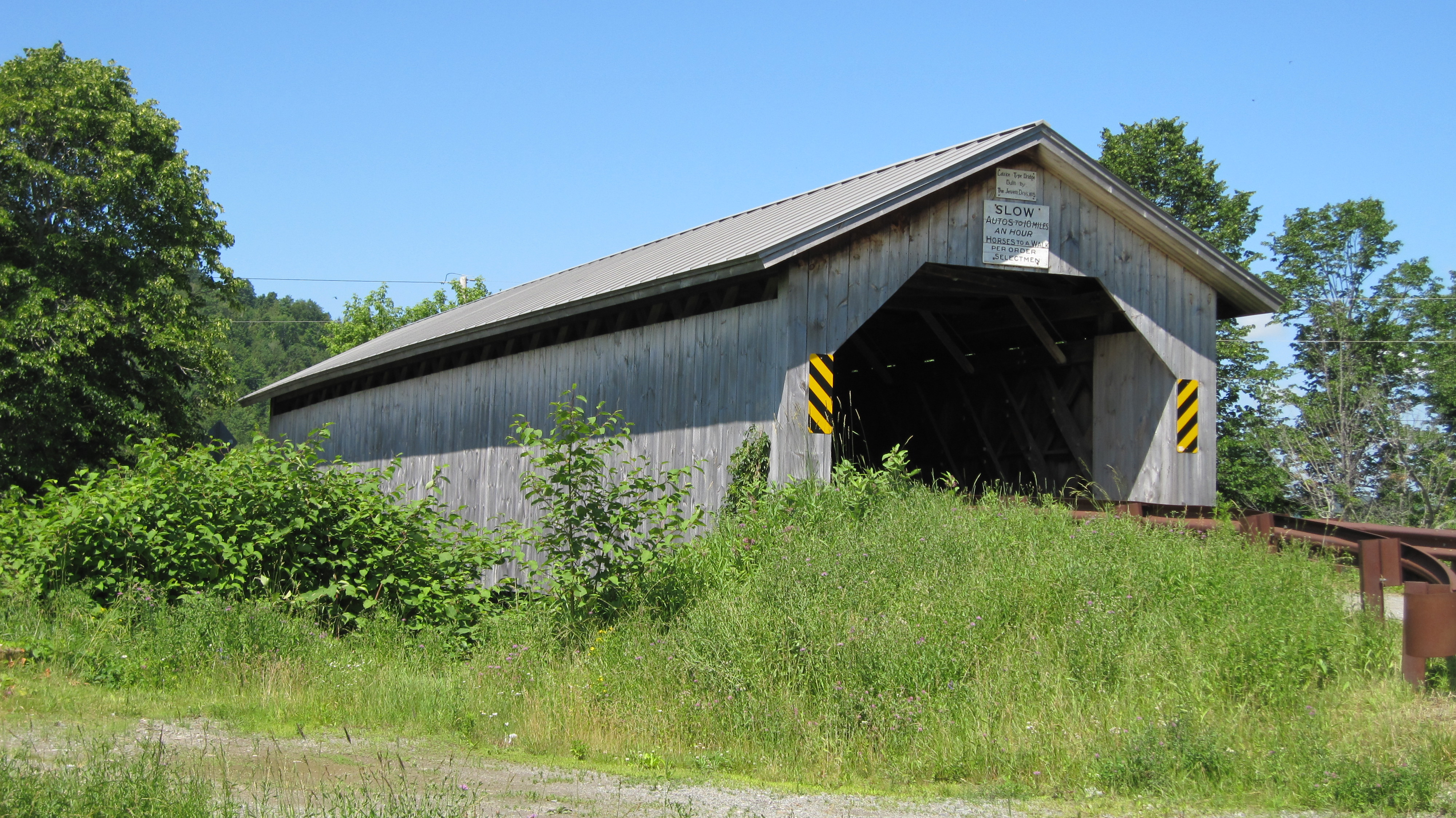
Hopkins Covered Bridge

Sheldon & Savannah Jewett were brothers who built covered bridges, including of the Town lattice design.

A number of their works are listed on the U.S. National Register of Historic Places.

Works include (attribution):

- Comstock Covered Bridge, off VT 118 over Trout River Montgomery, VT Jewett, Sheldon & Savannah
- Fuller Covered Bridge, Town Rd. over Black Falls Brook at Montgomery Village Montgomery, VT Jewett, Sheldon & Savannah
- Hectorville Covered Bridge, 1.8 mi. S of Montgomery Center over South Branch of Trout River Montgomery, VT Jewett, Sheldon & Savannah
- Hopkins Covered Bridge, Town Rd. over Trout River Enosburg, VT Jewett, Sheldon & Savannah
- Hutchins Covered Bridge, S of Montgomery Center over South Branch of Trout River Montgomery, VT Jewett, Sheldon & Savannah
- Longley Covered Bridge, NW of Montgomery over Trout River Montgomery, VT Jewett, Sheldon & Savannah
- West Hill Covered Bridge, 3.2 mi. S of Montgomery over West Hill Brook Montgomery, VT Jewett, Sheldon & Savannah
