= Longley Covered Bridge =

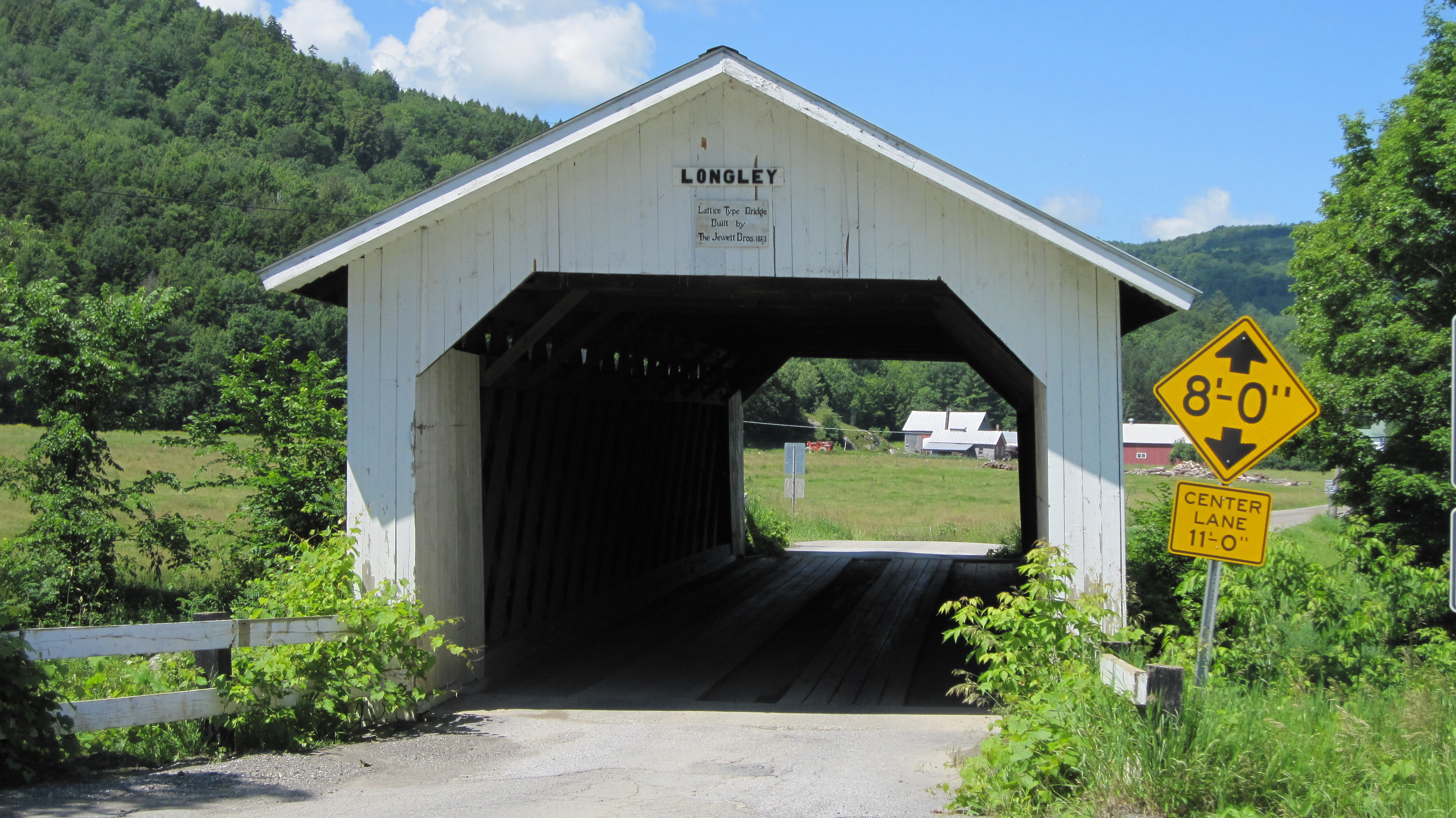
- Bridge in U.S. state of Vermont
- Coordinates: 44°54′25″N 72°39′18″W
- Carries: Automobile
- Crosses: Trout River
- Locale: Montgomery, Vermont
- Maintained by: Town of Montgomery
- ID number: VT-06-08

Characteristics
- Design: Covered, Town lattice
- Material: Wood
- Total length: 84 ft 7 in (25.78 m)
- Width: 16 ft 1.25 in (4.91 m)
- No. of spans: 1
- Load limit: 3 tons
- Clearance above: 11 ft 0 in (3.35 m)

History
- Constructed by: Sheldon and Savannah Jewett
- Construction end: 1863
- Longley Covered Bridge
- U.S. National Register of Historic Places
- Location within Vermont Location within the United States
- Coordinates: 44°54′26″N 72°39′19″W
- Area: 1 acre (0.40 ha)
- NRHP reference No.: 74000220
- Added to NRHP: December 30, 1974

The Longley Covered Bridge, also known as the Harnois Covered Bridge, is a wooden covered bridge that crosses the Trout River in Montgomery, Vermont on Longley Bridge Road. Built in 1863, this Town lattice truss bridge is the oldest of a group of area bridges built by brothers Sheldon & Savannah Jewett. It was listed on the National Register of Historic Places in 1974. The bridge is closed to traffic, and has been bypassed by an adjacent temporary bridge.

== Description and history ==
The Longley Covered Bridge is located in a rural area northwest of the village center of Montgomery, on Longley Bridge Road just west of its junction with Vermont Route 118. It crosses the Trout River in an east–west orientation, resting on abutments of stone and concrete. The bridge consists of flanking Town lattice trusses 84.5 feet (25.8 m) long. The bridge is 19.5 feet (5.9 m) wide, with a roadway width of 16 feet (4.9 m) (one lane). The exterior is finished in vertical board siding, which extends around to the interior of the portals. The siding does not extend the full height on the sides, leaving an open strip below the eaves. The bridge deck consists of wooden planking, and reinforcing stringers have been added to its underside. The bridge has a roof of standing seam metal.

The bridge was built in 1863 by the Jewett brothers, who are credited with the construction of all of Montgomery's surviving covered bridges; it is the oldest of their surviving bridges. The brothers operated a sawmill in Montgomery's West Hill area. They prepared the wood for the bridges at their sawmill. The brothers are credited with building seven area surviving covered bridges, distinctive in Vermont as the highest concentration of bridges in the state with a single attributed builder.

A complete restoration of the bridge was conducted in 1992 by Jan Lewandoski. The bridge is currently leaning to one side and the trusses are bowed in the middle. It has been closed and bypassed by a temporary bridge.

== See also ==
- List of covered bridges in Vermont
- National Register of Historic Places listings in Franklin County, Vermont
- List of bridges on the National Register of Historic Places in Vermont
