= Montgomery House (Montgomery, Vermont) =

- U.S. National Register of Historic Places
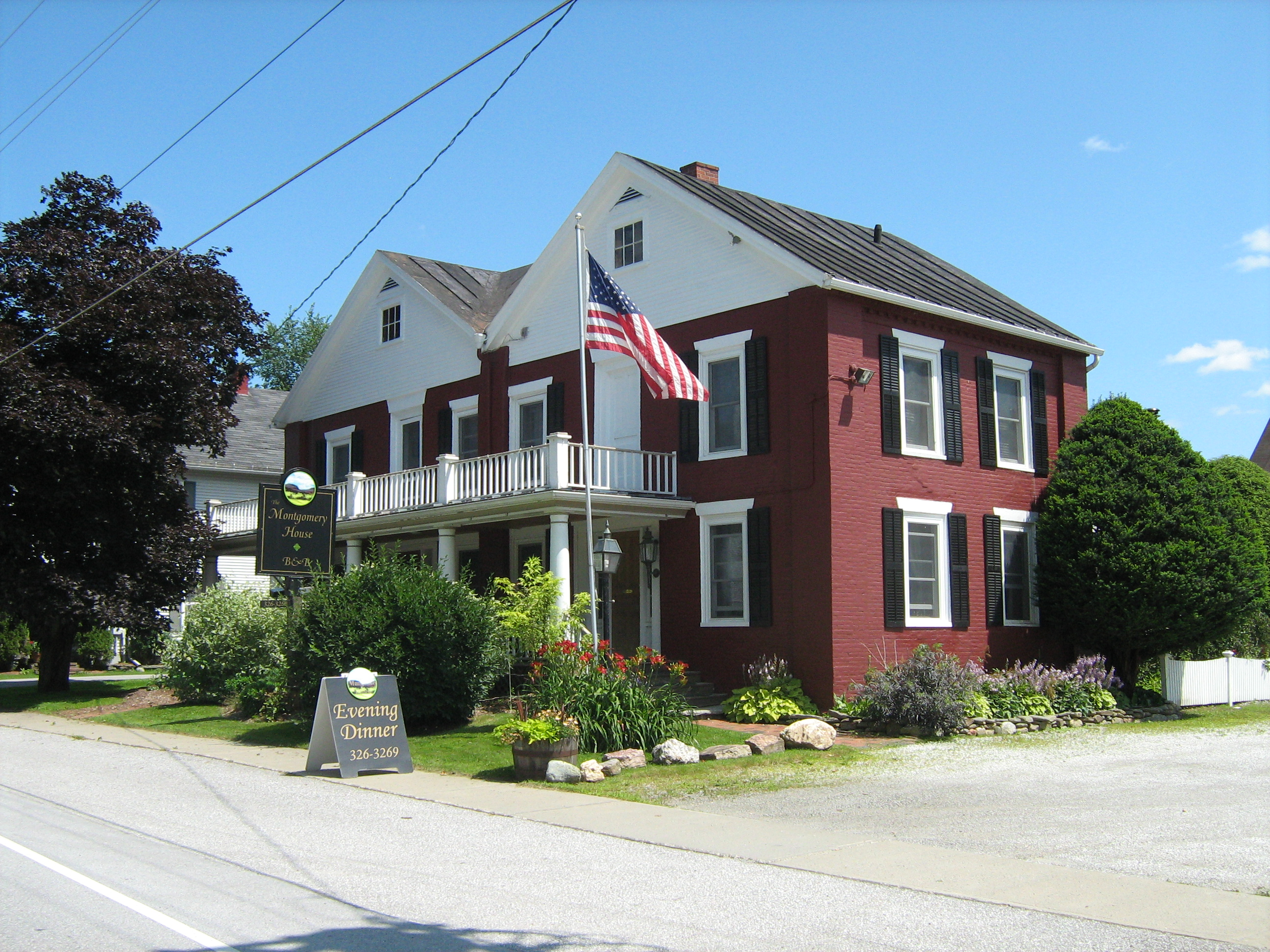

- Location within Vermont Location within the United States
- Location: VT 118, Montgomery, Vermont
- Coordinates: 44°54′5″N 72°38′27″W
- Area: less than one acre
- Built: 1803
- Architectural style: Federal
- NRHP reference No.: 92000997
- Added to NRHP: August 20, 1992

The Montgomery House is a historic travel accommodation on Vermont Route 118 in the center of Montgomery, Vermont. Built in 1803, it is one of the town's oldest buildings, and it served for many years as a social and civic center in the small community. It was listed on the National Register of Historic Places in 1992.

== Description and history ==
The Montgomery House stands just west of the town's triangular green, on the south side of North Main Street (Vermont 118). It is a 2-1/2 story brick building, with a twin-gabled roof and stone foundation. Its front is basically a pair of three-bay facades, each with center entrances on both levels, the upper doorways providing access to the roof of a porch extending across the building's center four bays. The gable ends are framed in wood and finished in clapboards, with small square windows near the gable peak. The interior of the building retains a number of original features, including wooden floors fastened with cut nails, and a 19th-century room layout on the upper level.

The building was erected in 1803, on the route of the American Revolutionary War-era Bayley-Hazen Military Road, and is the oldest known building in the town. It served for many years as a major civic and social meeting point, since the community had no other public buildings. Church services and town meetings were held here until the mid-19th century. As tourism arose as a trade in the late 19th century, the inn became more of a hotel, a role it has had intermittently through the 20th century.

== See also ==
- National Register of Historic Places listings in Franklin County, Vermont
