= Montgomery Center, Vermont =

- Village
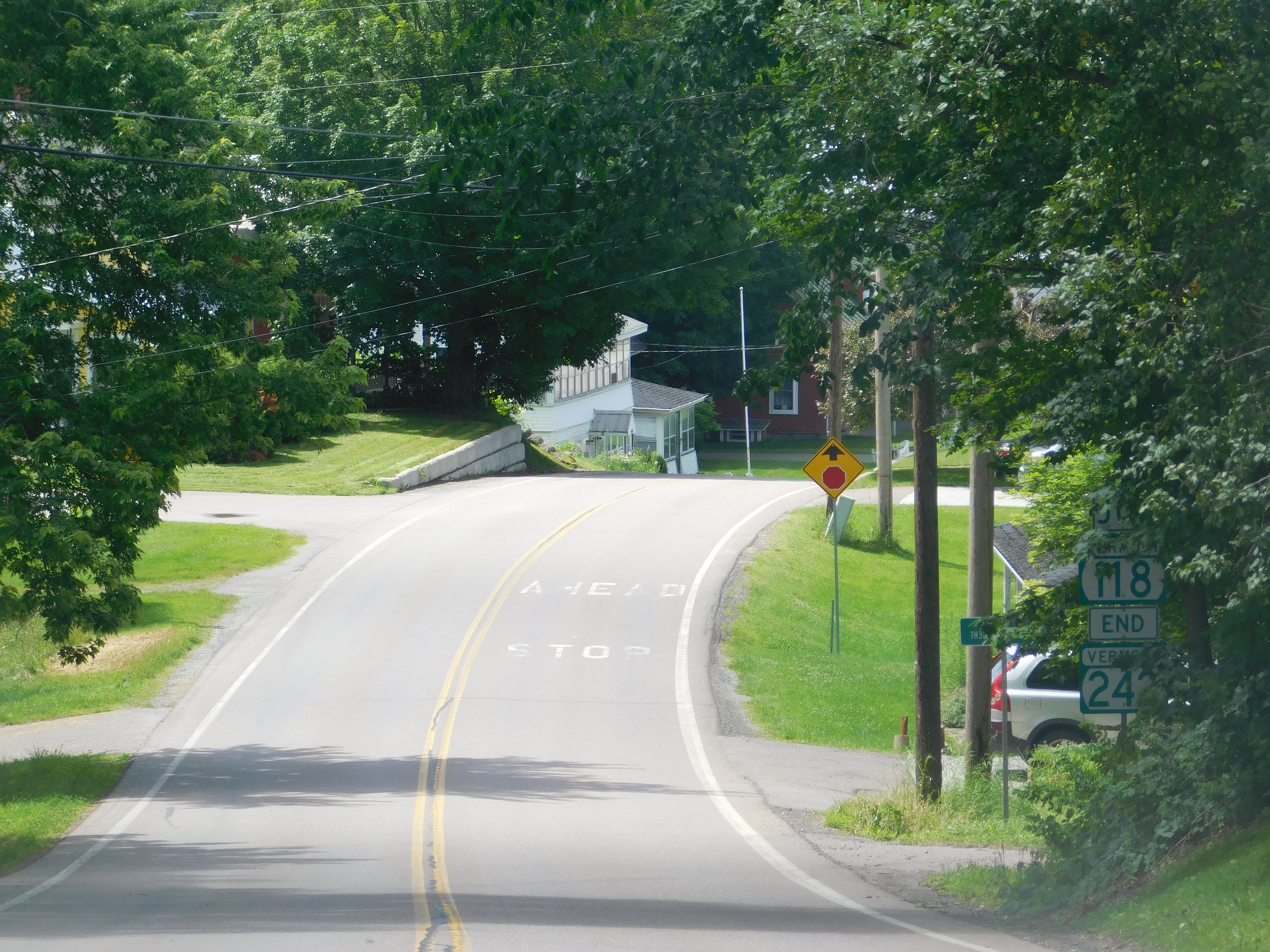
- Vermont Route 242 in Montgomery Center, 2017

- Location within Vermont
- Coordinates: 44°52′41″N 72°36′08″W
- Country: United States
- State: Vermont
- County: Franklin
- Elevation: 591 ft (180 m)
- Time zone: UTC-5 (Eastern (EST))
  - Summer (DST): UTC-4 (EDT)
- ZIP code: 05471
- Area code: 802
- GNIS feature ID: 1458522

Montgomery Center is an unincorporated village in the town of Montgomery, Franklin County, Vermont, United States. The community is located at the intersection of Vermont Routes 58, 118, and 242, 10 miles (16 km) east-southeast of Enosburg Falls. Montgomery Center has a post office with ZIP code 05471.

== Notable people ==
- Elle Purrier St. Pierre (born 1995), middle- and long-distance runner
