= Vermont Route 101 =

State highway in Orleans County, Vermont, US

Vermont Route 101
- Map of Orleans County in northern Vermont with VT 101 highlighted in red

Route information
- Maintained by VTrans
- Length: 4.333 mi (6.973 km)

Major junctions
- South end: VT 100 in Troy
- North end: VT 105 in Troy

Location
- Country: United States
- State: Vermont
- Counties: Orleans

Highway system
- State highways in Vermont
← VT 100C	→ VT 102

Vermont Route 101 (VT 101) is a state highway in the U.S. state of Vermont. The highway runs 4.333 miles (6.973 km) from VT 100 north to VT 105 within Troy in northwestern Orleans County.

== Route description ==
VT 101 begins at an intersection with VT 100 in the unincorporated village of Troy in the town of Troy. The two-lane highway heads north between the western town line and the Missisquoi River to the east. VT 101 crosses Bugbee Brook and meets the eastern end of VT 242. Near its northern end, the highway crosses Jay Branch and intersects Vielleux Road, which leads to the River Road Covered Bridge. VT 101 ends at a T-intersection with VT 105, which heads west toward Richford and north toward the incorporated village of North Troy.

== Major intersections ==
The entire route is in Troy, Orleans County.

mi	km	Destinations	Notes
0.000	0.000	VT 100 – Lowell, Morrisville, Newport	Southern terminus
3.132	5.040	VT 242 west – Jay, Montgomery	Eastern terminus of VT 242
4.333	6.973	VT 105 – North Troy, Stevens Mills, Richford	Northern terminus
1.000 mi = 1.609 km; 1.000 km = 0.621 mi
