= Hopkins Covered Bridge =

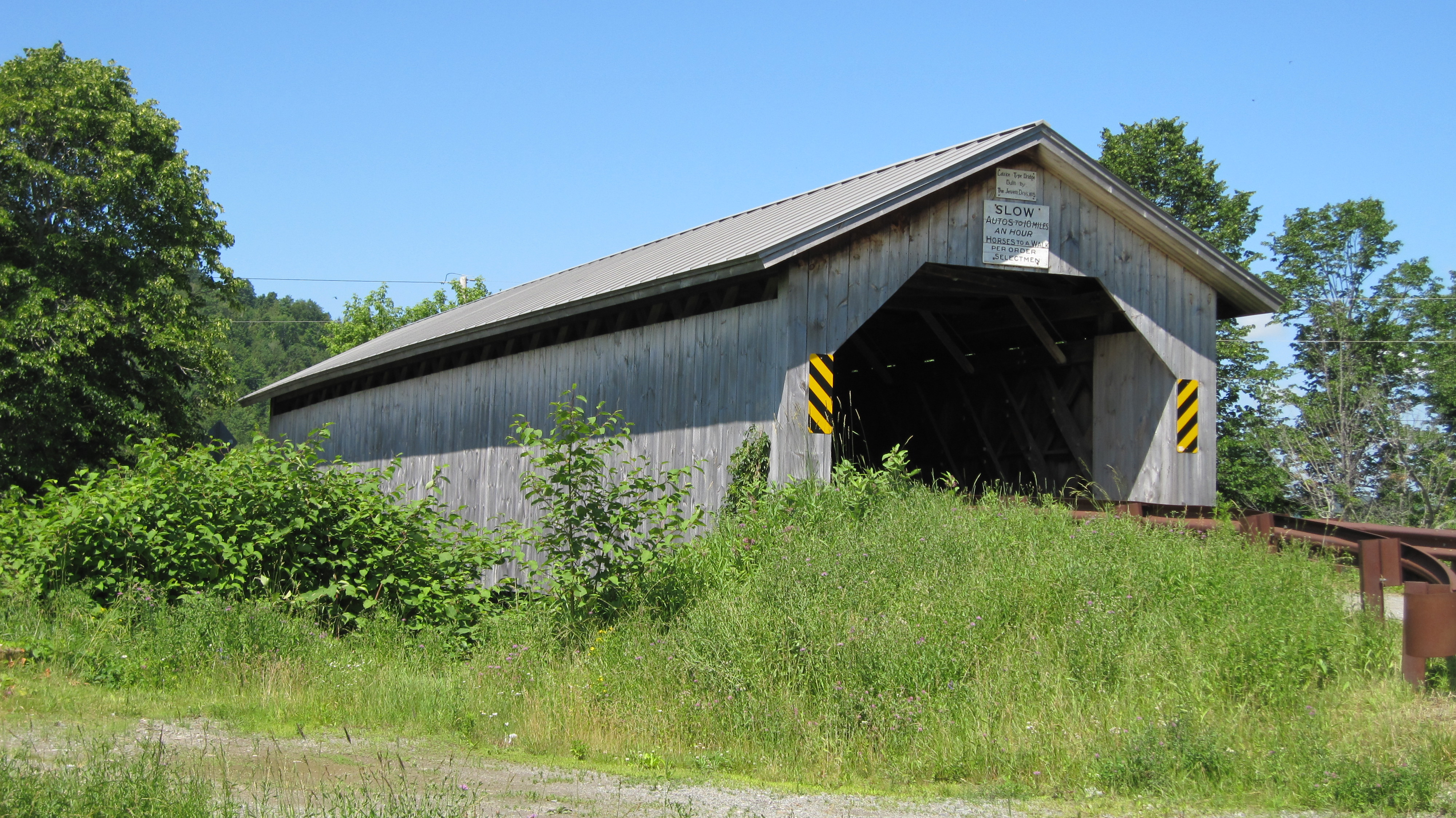
- Bridge in U.S. state of Vermont
- Coordinates: 44°55′16″N 72°40′23″W
- Carries: Hopkins Bridge Road
- Crosses: Trout River
- Locale: Enosburgh, Vermont
- Maintained by: Town of Enosburgh
- ID number: VT-06-01 (2)

Characteristics
- Design: Covered, town lattice
- Material: Wood
- Total length: 90 ft 5 in (27.56 m)
- Width: 15 ft 8.75 in (4.79 m)
- No. of spans: 1
- Clearance above: 8 ft 8 in (2.64 m)

History
- Constructed by: Sheldon and Savannah Jewett
- Construction end: 1875
- Hopkins Covered Bridge
- U.S. National Register of Historic Places
- Location within Vermont Location within the United States
- Coordinates: 44°55′14″N 72°40′22″W
- Area: 1 acre (0.40 ha)
- NRHP reference No.: 74000218
- Added to NRHP: November 20, 1974

The Hopkins Covered Bridge is a wooden covered bridge that crosses the Trout River in Enosburg, Vermont on Hopkins Bridge Road. Built in 1875 by brothers Sheldon & Savannah Jewett, it is one of a cluster of area covered bridges all attributed to the same builders. It was listed on the National Register of Historic Places in 1974.

== Description and history ==
The Hopkins Covered Bridge stands in a rural area of northeastern Enosburg, just west of Vermont Route 118 on Hopkins Bridge Road, which provides access to a single farm property. The bridge spans the Trout River in an east–west orientation. It is of Town lattice truss design, 91 feet (28 m) in length and 19.5 feet (5.9 m) in width, with a roadway width of 16 feet (4.9 m) (one lane). It is covered by a gabled roof, and is sheathed by vertical board siding, which extends a short way inside the portals to shelter the truss ends. The siding stops short of the truss tops, providing openings at the top. The bridge decking consists of wooden planking.

The bridge was built in 1875 by the Jewett brothers of adjacent Montgomery, who are credited with building Montgomery's six surviving covered bridges. This assemblage is one of the most concentrated in Vermont all attributable to a single builder. The Jewetts used standardized dimensions for their construction (except for the bridge length), and prepared wood for the bridges at their lumberyard in Montgomery's West Hill area.

The Vermont Agency of Transportation in 1993 reported that the bridge was over-stressed and it was closed. The one farm that the bridge served was provided with a temporary bridge. It was completely renovated by Renauld Bros. of Vernon and reopened in 1999.

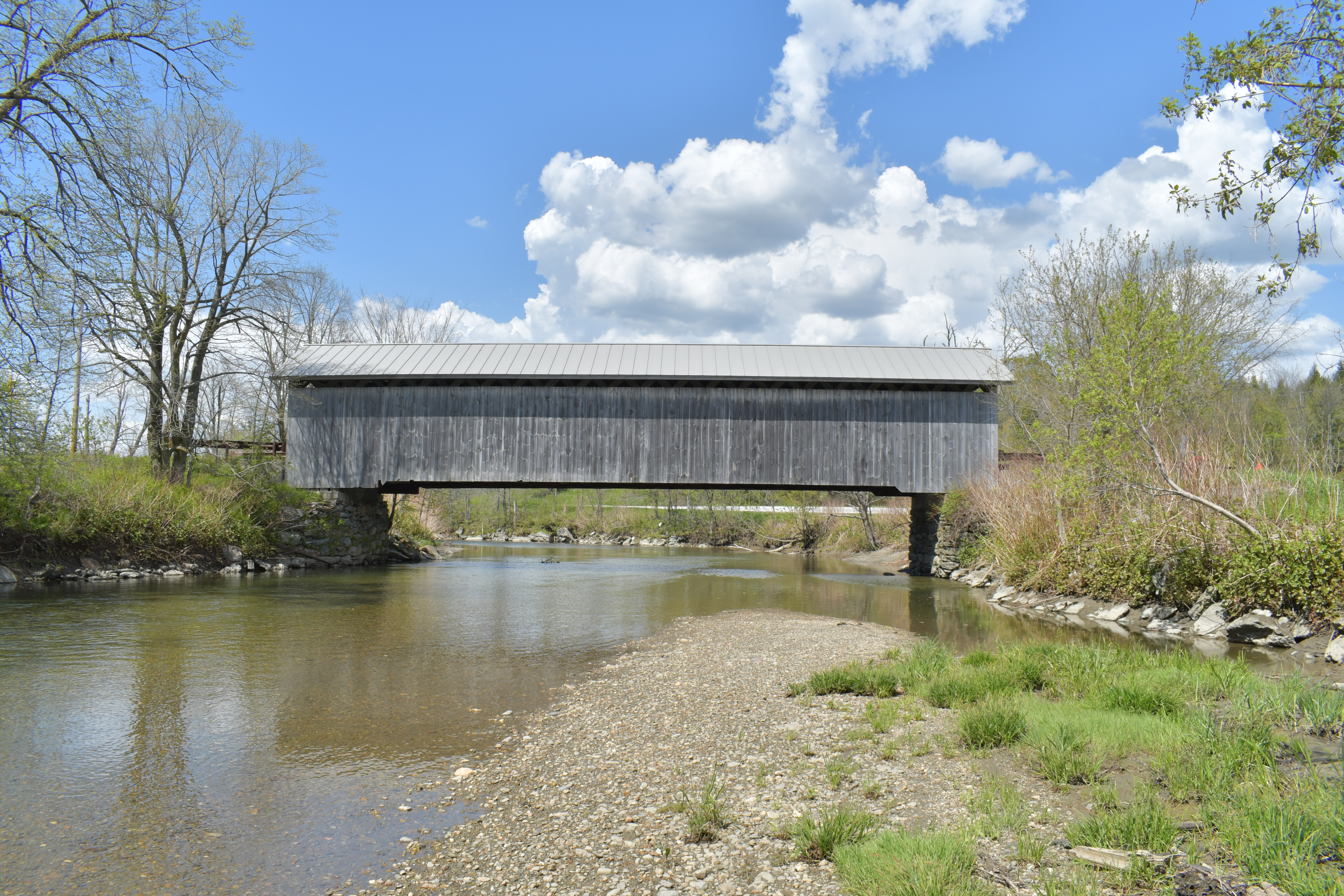

== See also ==
- List of covered bridges in Vermont
- National Register of Historic Places listings in Franklin County, Vermont
- List of bridges on the National Register of Historic Places in Vermont
