= West Berkshire School =

- U.S. National Register of Historic Places
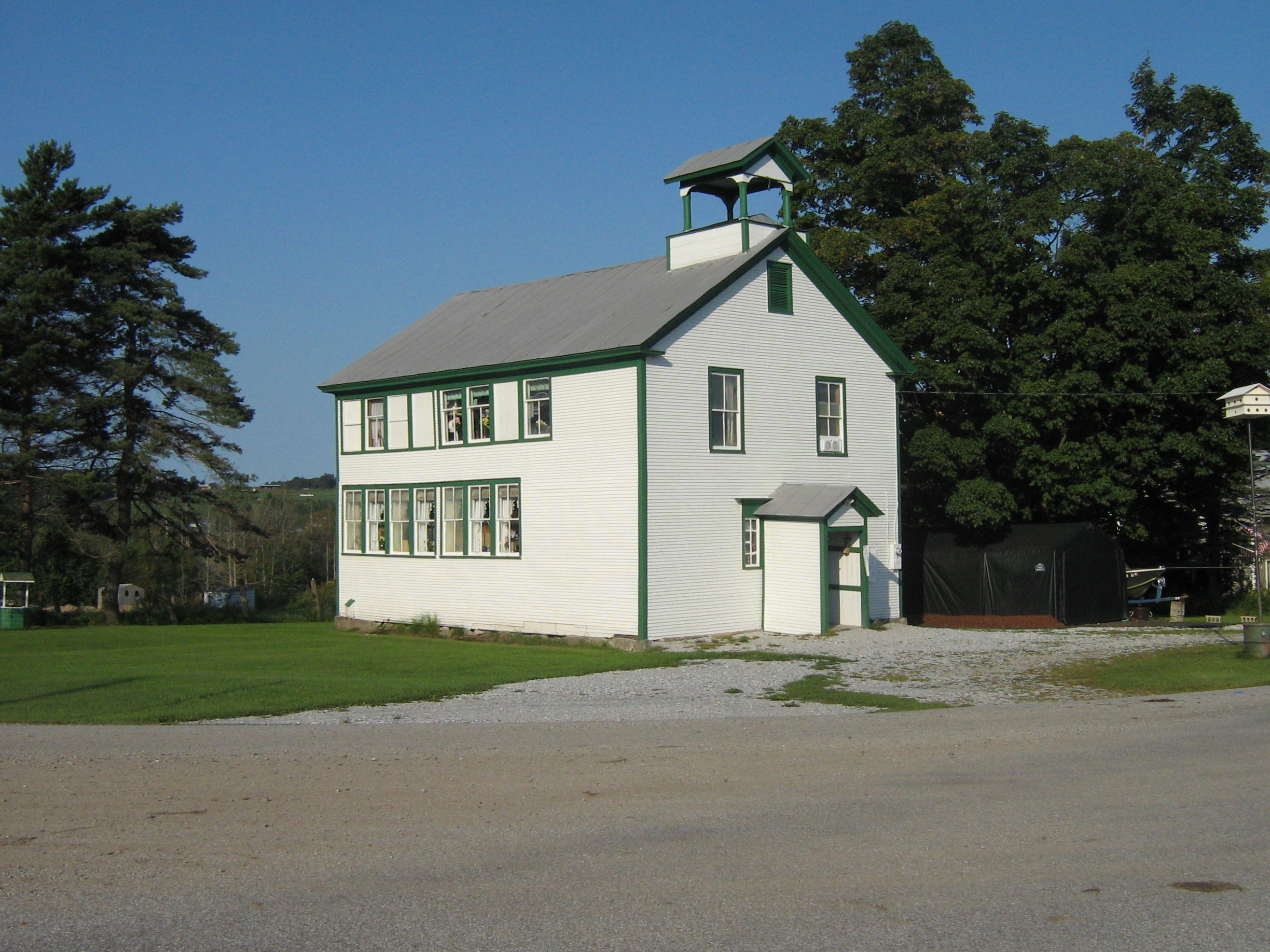

- Location within Vermont Location within the United States
- Location: Jct. of Berkshire Center and Mineral Brook Rds., Berkshire, Vermont
- Coordinates: 44°59′10″N 72°48′36″W
- Area: 0.3 acres (0.12 ha)
- Built: 1820
- MPS: Educational Resources of Vermont MPS
- NRHP reference No.: 93001174
- Added to NRHP: November 4, 1993

The West Berkshire School is a historic school building at Berkshire Center and Mineral Brook Roads in Berkshire, Vermont. Built about 1820, it is one of the state's oldest surviving two-room two-story schoolhouses. It was used as a school until 1970. It was listed on the National Register of Historic Places in 1993.

== Description and history ==
The West Berkshire School is near the southeastern fringe of the crossroads village of West Berkshire, at the western corner of Berkshire Center Road (Vermont Route 118) and Mineral Brook Road. It is a vernacular two-story wood-frame building with a gabled roof and clapboarded exterior. A small square belltower rises from the roof ridge, with an open belfry covered by a gabled roof. The front facade is symmetrical, with a center entrance sheltered by an open gable-roofed vestibule. The vestibule is flanked by narrow windows, and there are sash windows on the second level. Fenestration on the side walls is irregular, the most significant arrangement being a bank of seven sash windows on the lower level of the east side, a likely early 20th-century alteration made to satisfy new state regulations regarding natural lighting. The interior consists of single chambers on each floor, with a staircase in a corner near the entrance. The building has been fitted with electricity, but has never had plumbing or heat other than a wood stove. An enclosed wood-frame fire escape was added to the west side in the 20th century, which also served to shelter the privy area.

The school was probably built about 1820, based on stylistic analysis of its architecture. It is extremely unusual as a two-story two-room district schoolhouse, since most of Vermont's district schools (surviving and otherwise) were single-story single-room buildings. At the time of its National Register listing in 1993, there were six known examples of such schools in the state.

== See also ==
- National Register of Historic Places listings in Franklin County, Vermont
