= Comstock Covered Bridge (Montgomery, Vermont) =

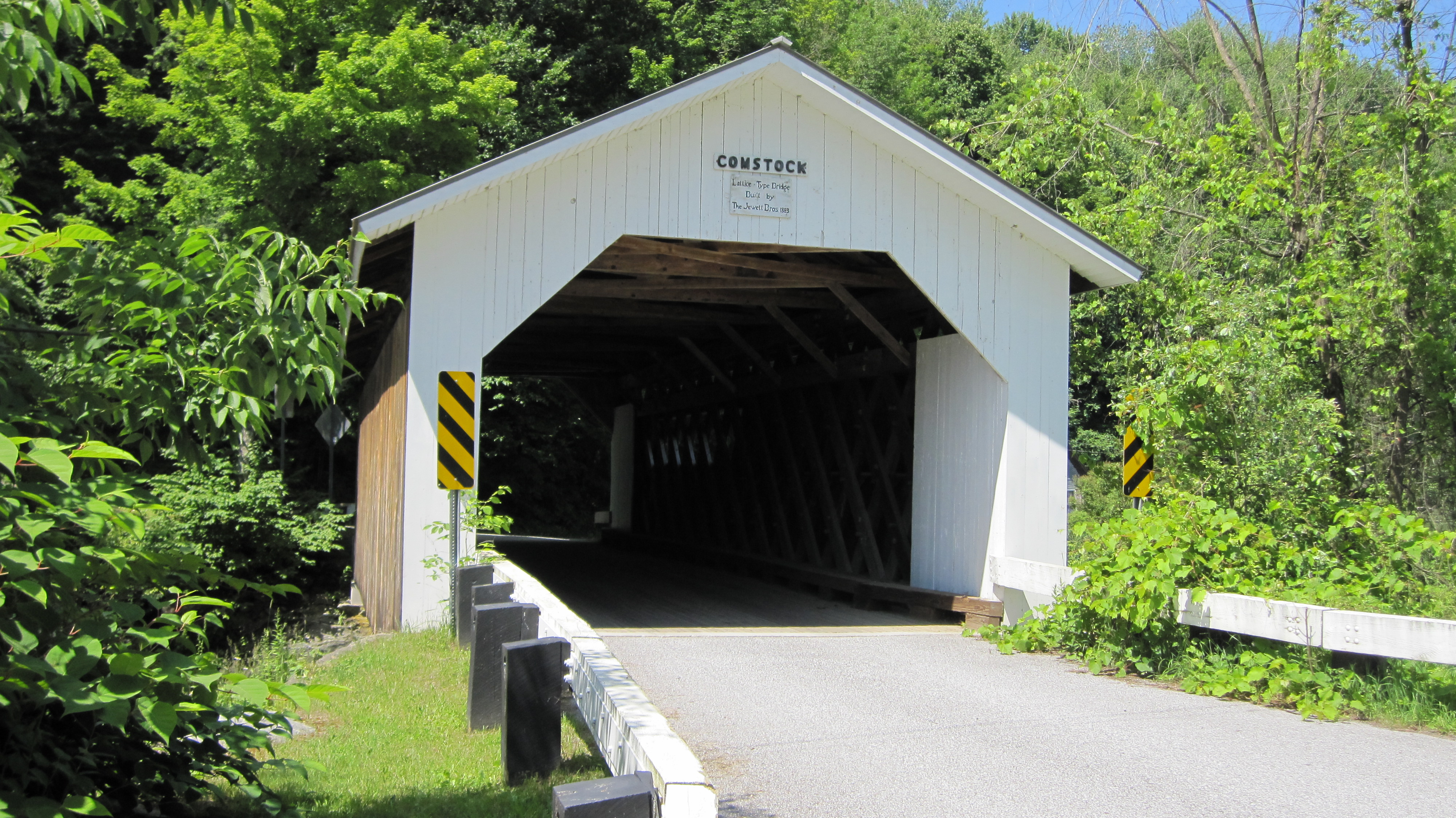
- Coordinates: 44°53′56″N 72°38′38″W
- Carries: Automobile
- Crosses: Trout River
- Locale: Montgomery, Vermont
- Maintained by: Town of Montgomery
- ID number: VT-06-04

Characteristics
- Design: Covered, Town lattice
- Material: Wood
- Total length: 68 ft 10.5 in (21.0 m)
- Width: 16 ft 1.25 in (4.9 m)
- No. of spans: 1
- Clearance above: 10 ft 8 in (3.3 m)

History
- Constructed by: Sheldon and Savannah Jewett
- Construction end: 1883
- Comstock Covered Bridge
- U.S. National Register of Historic Places
- Location within Vermont Location within the United States
- Coordinates: 44°53′58″N 72°38′39″W
- Area: 1 acre (0.4 ha)
- Built: 1883
- NRHP reference No.: 74000212
- Added to NRHP: November 19, 1974

The Comstock Covered Bridge is a wooden covered bridge that crosses the Trout River in Montgomery, Vermont on Comstock Bridge Road. Built in 1883, it is one of several area bridges built by Sheldon & Savannah Jewett. It was listed on the National Register of Historic Places in 1974.

== Description and history ==
The Comstock Covered Bridge stands just west of the Montgomery Village, carrying Comstock Bridge Road over the Trout River south of Vermont Route 118. It is a Town lattice design, 69 feet (21 m) long, resting on abutments of dry laid stone and concrete. Its roadway is 16 feet (4.9 m) wide (one lane), and has a total overall width of 19.5 feet (5.9 m). The exterior is clad in vertical board siding, and it is covered by a metal roof. The portal ends are also finished in vertical board siding, which extends a short way inside, and whose exterior parts are normally painted white.

The bridge was built in 1883 by Sheldon & Savannah Jewett, brothers who lived in Montgomery. The Jewett brothers are credited with building six surviving bridges in Montgomery as well as some in surrounding communities, representing one of the best-documented concentrations of bridges by a single builder in the state. The original timber for the bridge was prepared by the Jewetts at their mill in Montgomery's West Hill area.

A complete renovation of the bridge was carried out by Blow & Cote, of Morrisville, Vermont, in 2003. A comprehensive series of articles chronicling the work can be found at the Vermont Covered Bridges web site.

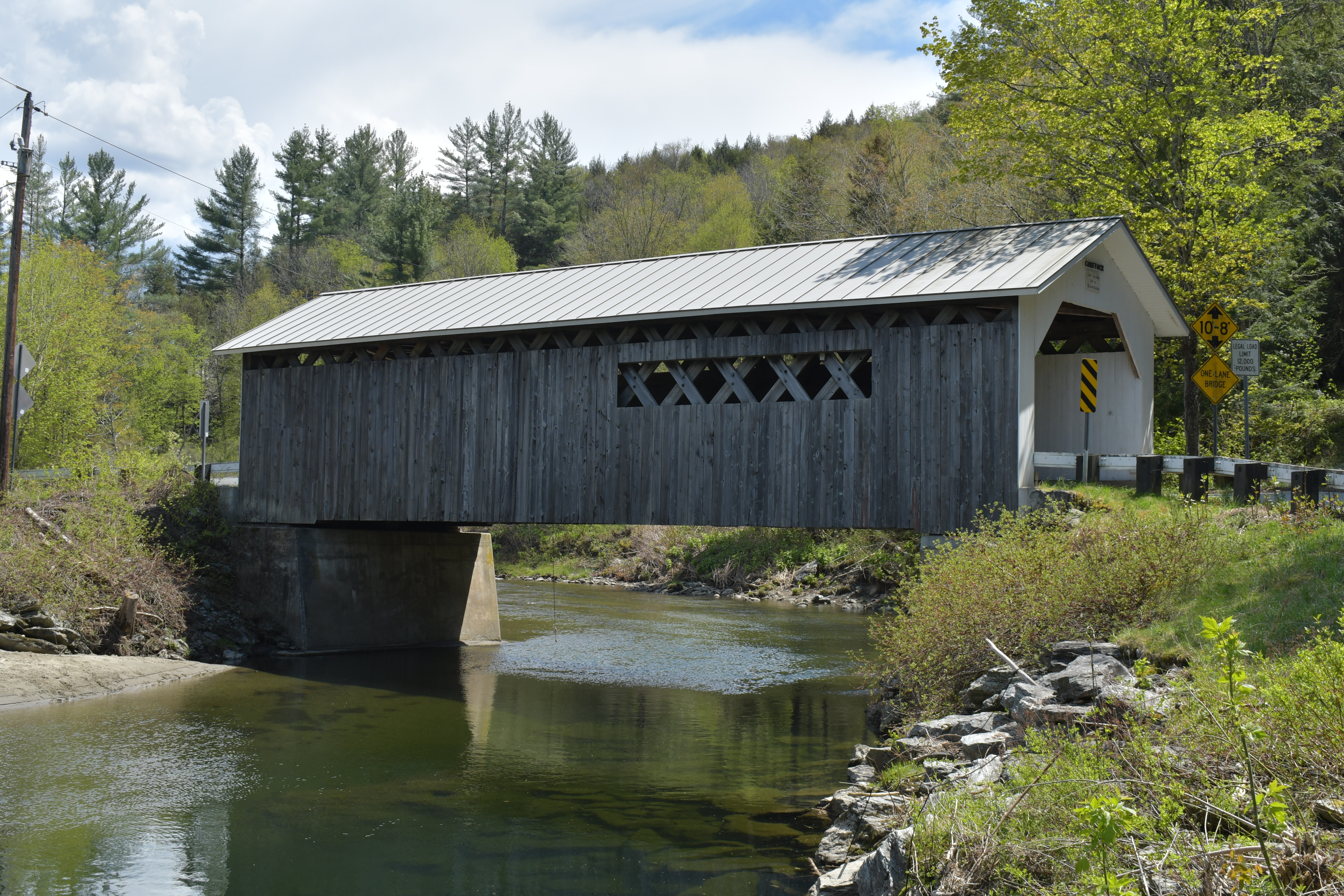

== See also ==
- List of covered bridges in Vermont
- National Register of Historic Places listings in Franklin County, Vermont
- List of bridges on the National Register of Historic Places in Vermont
