= East Berkshire, Vermont =

- Village
- Location within Vermont
- Coordinates: 44°56′07″N 72°42′33″W
- Country: United States
- State: Vermont
- County: Franklin
- Elevation: 420 ft (130 m)
- Time zone: UTC-5 (Eastern (EST))
  - Summer (DST): UTC-4 (EDT)
- ZIP code: 05447
- Area code: 802
- GNIS feature ID: 1457251

East Berkshire is an unincorporated village in the town of Berkshire, Franklin County, Vermont, United States. The community is located along the Missisquoi River at the intersection of Vermont Route 105 and Vermont Route 118, 5 miles (8.0 km) east-northeast of Enosburg Falls. East Berkshire had a post office until February 14, 2004; it still has its own ZIP code, 05447.
