= St. Bartholomew's Episcopal Church (Montgomery, Vermont) =

Historic church in Vermont, United States

- U.S. National Register of Historic Places
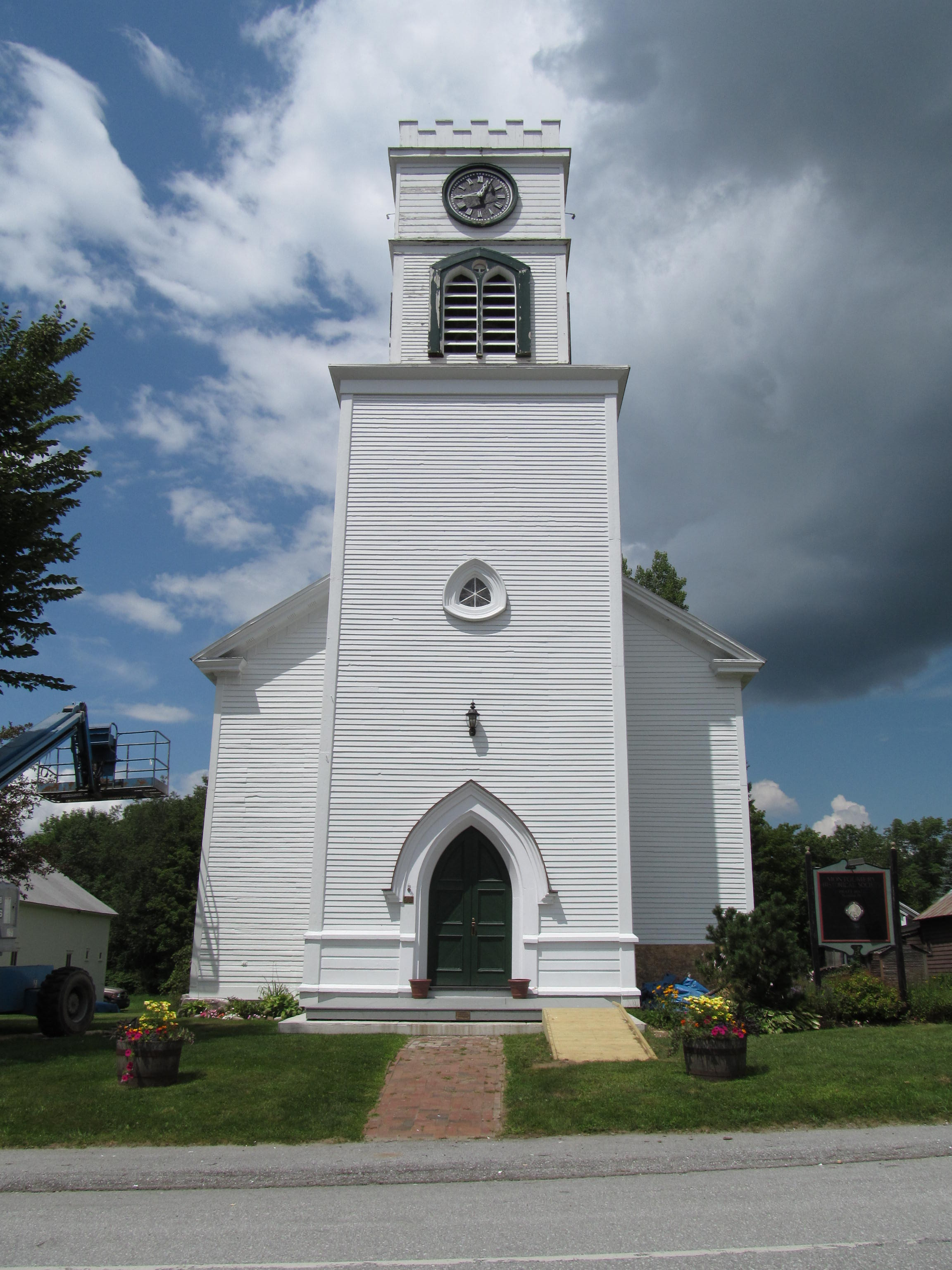

- Location within Vermont Location within the United States
- Location: VT 118, Montgomery, Vermont
- Coordinates: 44°54′6.2″N 72°38′25.8″W
- Area: 0.5 acres (0.20 ha)
- Built: 1835
- Architectural style: Gothic Revival
- NRHP reference No.: 88001467
- Added to NRHP: October 1, 1988

St. Bartholomew's Episcopal Church is a historic church building located on Vermont Route 118 in Montgomery, Vermont in the United States. Its congregation was formed in 1821 as Union Episcopal Church. Church construction began in 1833 and was completed in 1835, when it was consecrated by the Rt. Rev. John Henry Hopkins, first bishop of the Episcopal Diocese of Vermont. In 1897 its name was changed to St. Bartholomew's Episcopal Church.

The congregation disbanded and the church was deconsecrated in 1974. It is owned by the Montgomery Historical Society and is now known as Pratt Hall. On October 1, 1988, it was added to the National Register of Historic Places. The building is a prominent early example of Gothic Revival architecture in the state.

== Description and history ==
Pratt Hall stands in the village of Montgomery, just southwest of its triangular common on the northwest side of Vermont 118. It is a single-story wood-frame structure, with a gabled roof, clapboarded exterior, and square tower. The tower projects from the otherwise unadorned front facade, with a Gothic-arched entrance at the base, with narrow lancet-arch windows on the sides, and an oculus window above the entrance. The second stage houses the belfry, and is separated from the clock stage by a cornice. The tower is topped by a crenelated parapet. The interior contains elaborate woodwork in the Gothic style.

Montgomery's Episcopal congregation was one of the first in the town. This was its first church building, erected from 1832 to 1835 on land purchased in 1829. The church is one of Vermont's oldest examples of Gothic Revival architecture. Its construction began not long after completion of the first documented example of this style in Arlington. Originally a union church (shared by multiple congregations), this was soon used exclusively by the Episcopalians, as other denominations built their own churches. With its congregation in decline, in 1927 the church reduced its services to summer only, when more visitors came to town.

In 1972 the diocese decided that the building was no longer safe for use and was going to demolish it. The Montgomery Historical Society bought the building in 1974, and has restored and maintained it since then. In addition to using Pratt Hall for its own meetings, the society makes it available for others to use as a venue for weddings, small concerts, talks, or other community gatherings. The society named the building in honor of its founder, Lawrence Pratt, who was the driving force in rescuing the building from destruction.

== See also ==
- National Register of Historic Places listings in Franklin County, Vermont
- St. Bartholomew's Church (disambiguation)
- Union Church (disambiguation)
