= Vermont Route 242 =

State highway in Vermont, US

Vermont Route 242
- VT 242 highlighted in red

Route information
- Maintained by VTrans
- Length: 12.878 mi (20.725 km)
- Existed: 1959–present

Major junctions
- West end: VT 118 in Montgomery
- East end: VT 101 in Troy

Location
- Country: United States
- State: Vermont
- Counties: Franklin, Orleans

Highway system
- State highways in Vermont
← VT 236	→ VT 243

Vermont Route 242 (VT 242) is a 12.878-mile-long (20.725 km) state highway located in Franklin and Orleans counties, Vermont, United States. The route begins at an intersection with VT 118 (Main Street) in the town of Montgomery and runs through the Green Mountains of Vermont past Jay Peak to a junction with VT 101 in the town of Troy. The route was first designated by the state of Vermont in 1959 from the town of Jay to Troy, with the piece in the town of Montgomery being added five years later. In 1972, the segment in Westfield and Jay that connected the two segments was added to the state highway system.

== Route description ==
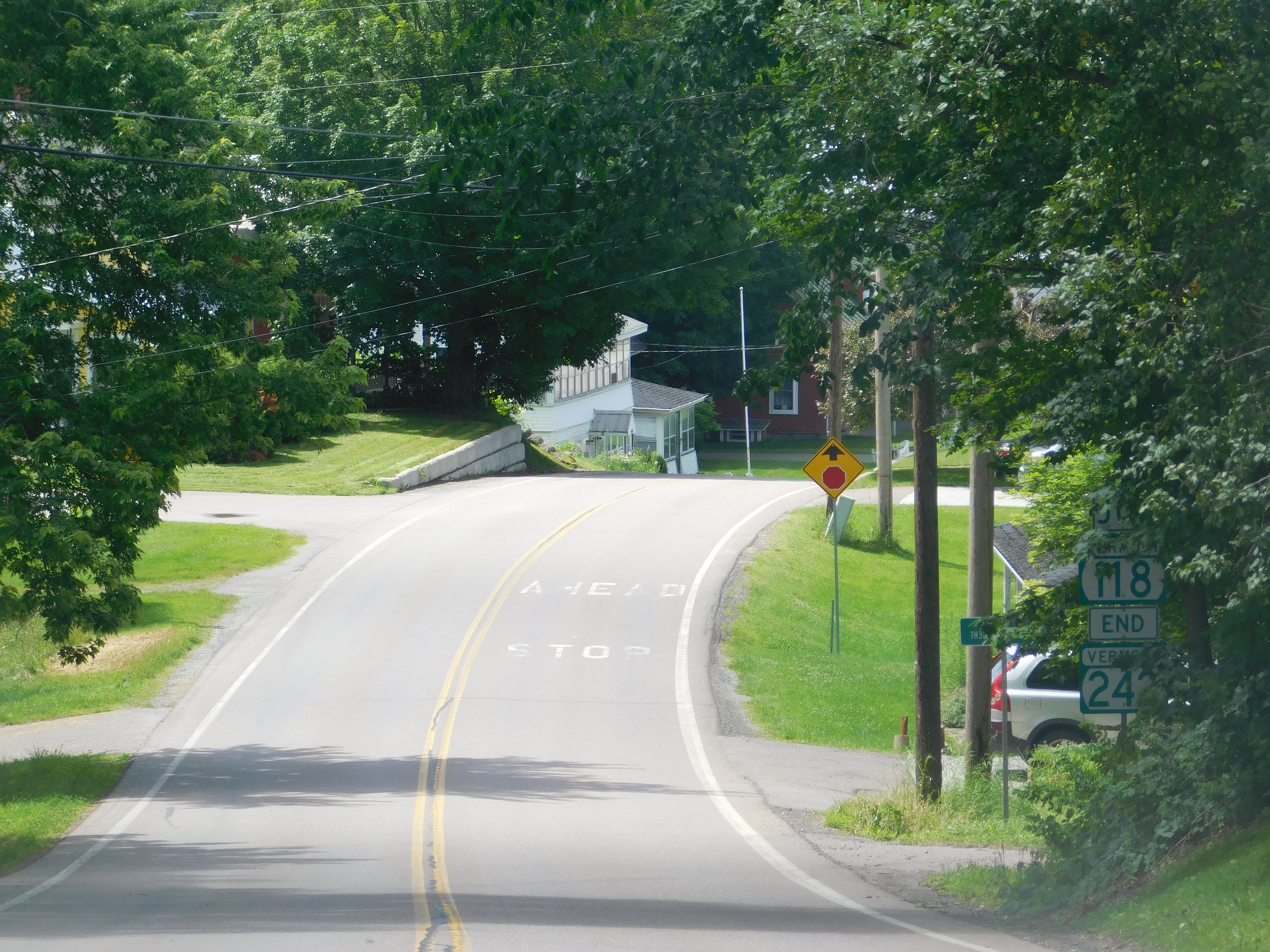
VT 242 approaching the junction with VT 118 in Montgomery Center

VT 242 begins at an intersection with VT 118 (Main Street) in the hamlet of Montgomery Center (in the town of Montgomery just north of the western terminus of VT 58. Running northeast through Montgomery Center, VT 242 runs along Mountain Road, a two-lane residential street through the eastern side of the hamlet. The route soon bends east and leaves the hamlet, turning east through the town of Montgomery, into a mix of dense woods and residences. The route winds east for a distance, reaching a junction with Minglewood Road, where VT 242 turns northeast running along the base of Big Jay Mountain. At the junction with Christmas Road, VT 242 turns northeast and crosses into Orleans County and into the town of Westfield.

VT 242 continues northeast through Westfield, dropping the Mountain Road moniker as it runs along Jay Peak. The route passes through dense woods along Jay Peak, running up the mountainside. After making a northwestern jog, VT 242 turns northeast, passing Access Road, which connects drivers to Jay Peak Ski Resort. Winding northeast, the route parallels Access Road, which soon meets Shortcut, which connects back to VT 242. Now in the town of Jay, VT 242 runs northeast past some residences before bending east to Graham Hill Road. At that junction, the route turns northeast again, reaching the hamlet of Jay. Through Jay, VT 242 passes a local restaurant and store at Cross Road. Leaving Jay, the route soon turns southeast into the town of Troy. In Troy, VT 242 goes east and reaches a junction with VT 101. This junction marks the eastern terminus of VT 242.

== History ==
VT 242 was first designated as two state-maintained highways, known as the Jay–Troy State Highway (which was 4.097 miles (6.593 km) long) and the Montgomery State Highway (3.382 miles (5.443 km) and consisted only of the route in the town of Montgomery). By petition, the state of Vermont re-designated the section between Jay and Troy as VT 242 in 1959. The section through the town of Montgomery was added on May 1, 1964. The remaining 4.965-mile (7.990 km) segment, located in the towns of Westfield and Jay, was added to the state highway system by executive order in 1972.

== Major intersections ==
County	Location	mi	km	Destinations	Notes
Franklin	Montgomery	0.000	0.000	VT 118 (Main Street) to VT 58 – Montgomery, East Berkshire, Eden, Hyde Park	Western terminus
Orleans	Troy	12.878	20.725	VT 101	Eastern terminus
1.000 mi = 1.609 km; 1.000 km = 0.621 mi
