= Henry Leavens =

American politician

Henry Paoli Leavens (1836–1917) was a member of the Wisconsin State Assembly during the 1877 session. Other positions he held include village president and town chairman (positions similar to mayor), alderman, board of education (similar to school board) member and county supervisor. He was a Republican.

Leavens was born on June 4, 1836, in Berkshire, Vermont and died March 17, 1917, in Neenah, Wisconsin.
