= Vermont Route 58 =

State highway in Franklin and Orleans counties in Vermont, US

Vermont Route 58
- VT 58 highlighted in red

Route information
- Maintained by VTrans and the towns of Lowell and Montgomery
- Length: 30.908 mi (49.742 km)

Major junctions
- West end: VT 118 in Montgomery
- VT 100 in Lowell; I-91 near Orleans
- East end: VT 5A in Brownington

Location
- Country: United States
- State: Vermont
- Counties: Franklin, Orleans

Highway system
- State highways in Vermont
| ← VT 56 | → VT 62 |

Vermont Route 58 (VT 58) is a 30.908-mile (49.742 km) east–west state highway in Franklin and Orleans counties in northern Vermont, United States. The western terminus of the route is at VT 118 in Montgomery. The eastern terminus of VT 58 is at VT 5A north of Westmore and Lake Willoughby. In Orleans, VT 58 runs concurrent to U.S. Route 5 (US 5) for a short distance, interchanging with Interstate 91 (I-91) at exit 26 during that interval. The portion of VT 58 west of VT 100 in Lowell is town-maintained. This section is a dirt road and is closed during the winter months because it goes through Hazens Notch.

== Route description ==
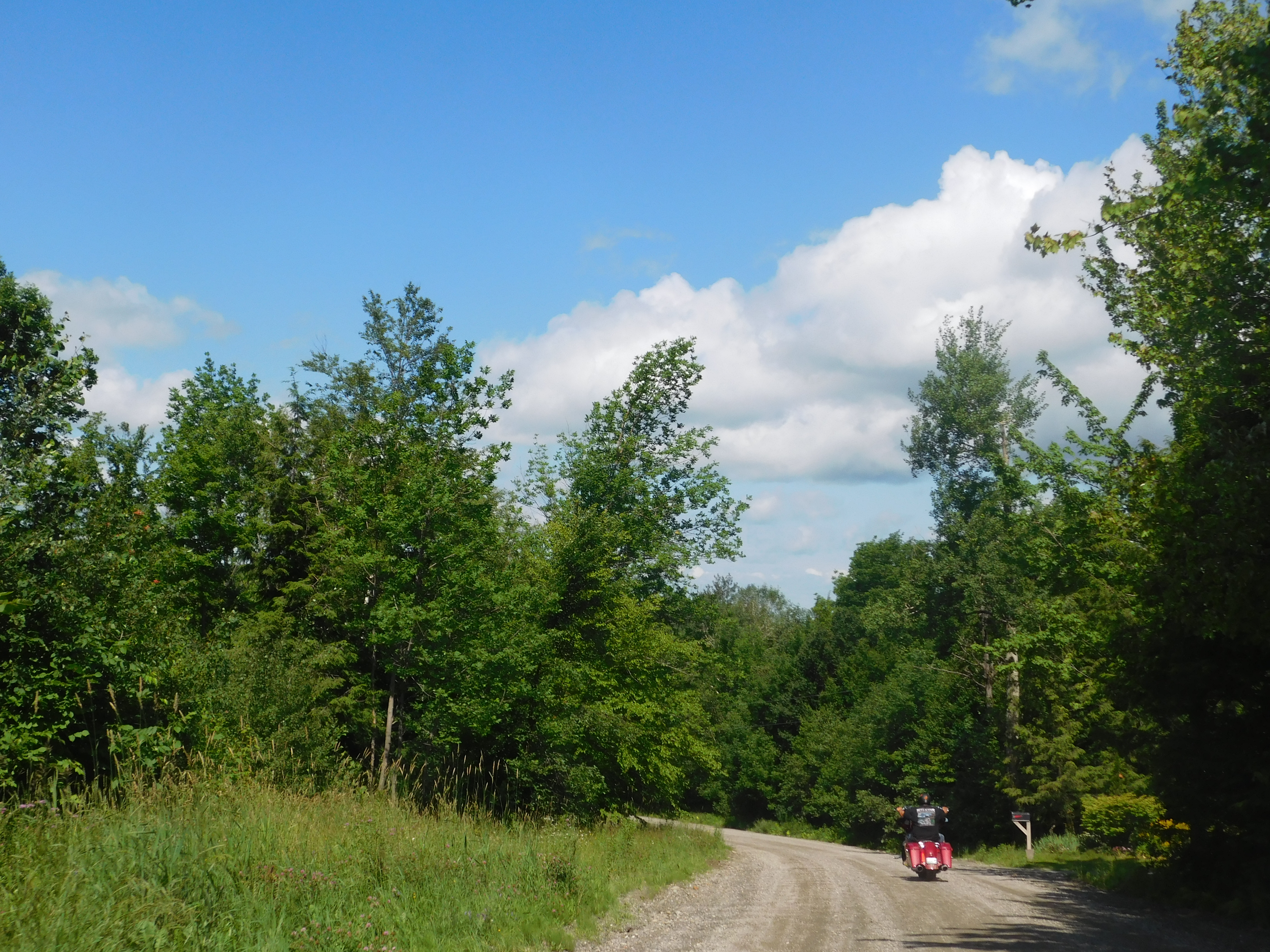
VT 58 through Hazens Notch

VT 58 begins at an intersection with VT 118 (South Main Street) just south of the junction with VT 242 in the Franklin County town of Montgomery. VT 58 is town-maintained in Montgomery, running southeast as a two-lane concrete Hazen's Notch Road. The route parallels the Trout River out of the Montgomery Center neighborhood, converting itself to a dirt road as it runs southeast as it enters Hazens Notch, a local mountain pass in Montgomery. The route crosses through dense woods as a dirt road, turning southeast past residences through the densely wooded mountainside. Soon the residences give way to just woods as VT 58 reaches the Orleans County line along the ridge of Hazens Notch. VT 58 crosses through the town of Westfield, entering Hazen's Notch State Park.

Running along the southern ridge of the park, VT 58 bends southeast and leaves the park, but remains in the dense woods as a two-lane dirt road. The route crosses a junction with Monteith Road, which connects to nearby Balance Rock Road. Soon crossing into the town of Lowell, the dense woods around VT 58 begin to break as it leaves Hazens Notch, passing nearby Green Hill Road. Winding southeast, the town-maintained road reaches Buck Hill Road as the route becomes residential. Retaining the Hazens Notch Road name, VT 58 winds southeast at the East Branch of the Missisquoi River, paralleling the river and reaching the residential area of Lowell. In Lowell, the route reaches a junction with VT 100. At this junction, VT 58 becomes maintained by the Vermont Agency of Transportation rather than the town of Lowell.

VT 58 drops the Hazen's Notch Road name, winding east through flat lands of Lowell. Turning northeast, the route becomes rural with no residences left until a few farmhouses near McAllister Road. The route winds northeast until Mitchell Road, where the route bends southeast for a jog. Turning northeast again, VT 58 begins an eastern wind through Lowell, crossing into the town of Irasburg. The route continues southeast through Irasburg, doing the same southeast–northeast jog it made in Lowell, climbing a ridge and past some large farms before reaching VT 14, where it passes a small housing development. At this junction, VT 58 and VT 14 become concurrent, running southeast through Irasburg and crossing the Black River near the junction with Under the Hill Road. Running along the riverside, VT 58 and VT 14 enter the center of Irasburg, where VT 58 turns east and off of VT 14.

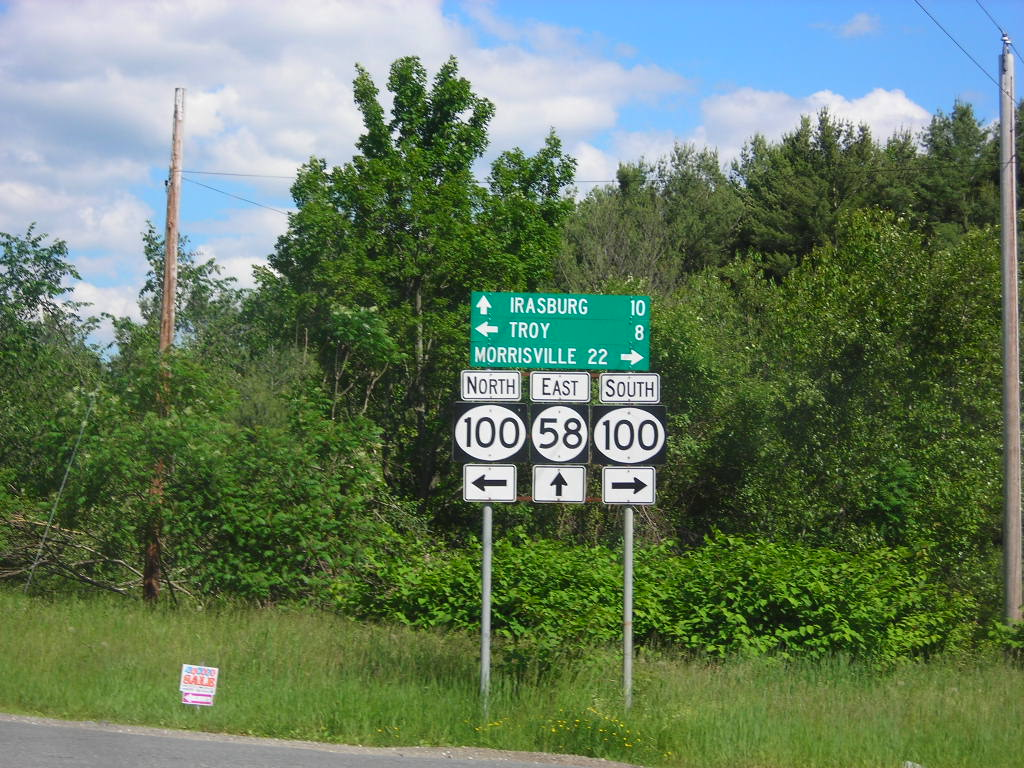
VT 58 at VT 100 in Lowell

Running alongside the Black River, VT 58 passes the eastern end of Under the Hill Road, leaving the center of Irasburg. Now winding east along the riverside, VT 58 quickly turns away from the river in Irasburg, soon reaching a junction with U.S. Route 5. At this junction, US 5 and VT 58 become concurrent, running southeast as a divided highway as it enters a partial cloverleaf interchange with Interstate 91 (exit 26). Remaining a divided highway, VT 58 and US 5 turns northeast and enters the center of Orleans, where US 5 turns south. Paralleling the Barton River, VT 58 runs on Main Street, crossing the nearby railroad tracks. Now known as Church Street, VT 58 merges into East Street, changing to that name before turning southeast on the Willoughby River as Willoughby Avenue.

Now in the town of Barton, VT 58 begins winding through some woods along the river, turning away from the river as Willoughby Avenue. Now reaching the hamlet of Evansville, the route enters the town of Brownington. At Hunt Hill Road, VT 58 leaves Evansville and winds southeast along the returned Willoughby River as Evansville Road. Remaining a two-lane road, the route is rural and runs through fields and dense woods until reaching a junction with VT 5A (Willoughby Lake Road). This junction marks the eastern terminus of VT 58.

== Major intersections ==
| County | Location | mi | km | Destinations | Notes |
|---|---|---|---|---|---|
| Franklin | Montgomery | 0.000 | 0.000 | VT 118 (South Main Street) to VT 242 east – Montgomery, Jay Peak Ski Area, Eden, Hyde Park | Western terminus; to VT 242 east via VT 118 north |
| Orleans | Lowell | 10.470 | 16.850 | VT 100 – Westfield, Morrisville | |
| Orleans | Irasburg | 18.786 | 30.233 | VT 14 north – Coventry, Newport | Western end of concurrency with VT 14 |
| Orleans | Irasburg | 20.064 | 32.290 | VT 14 south – Albany, Hardwick | Eastern end of concurrency with VT 14 |
| Orleans | Irasburg | 23.391 | 37.644 | US 5 north – Coventry, Jay Peak Ski Area | Western end of concurrency with US 5 |
| Orleans | Barton | 23.635– 23.860 | 38.037– 38.399 | I-91 – Barton, St. Johnsbury, Newport | Exit 26 on I-91; partial cloverleaf interchange |
| Orleans | Orleans | 23.900 | 38.463 | US 5 south (Barton Orleans Road) | Eastern end of concurrency with US 5 |
| Orleans | Brownington | 30.908 | 49.742 | VT 5A (Willoughby Lake Road) – West Charleston, Derby Center, Lake Willoughby, West Burke | Eastern terminus |
1.000 mi = 1.609 km; 1.000 km = 0.621 mi: Concurrency terminus

== See also ==
- List of state highways in Vermont
