= West Hill Covered Bridge =

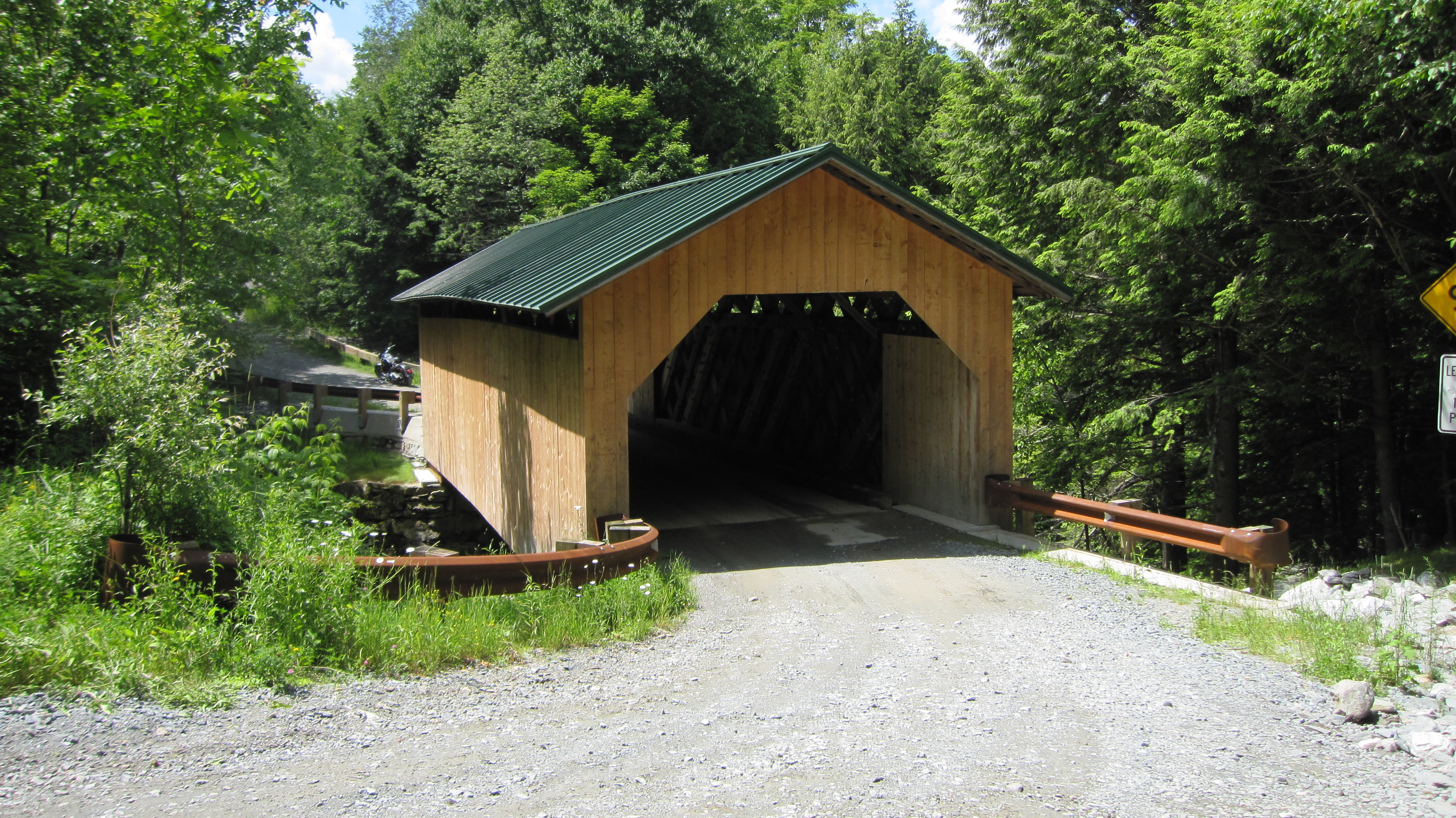
- Bridge in U.S. state of Vermont
- Coordinates: 44°52′01″N 72°38′53″W
- Carries: Automobile
- Crosses: West Hill Brook
- Locale: Montgomery, Vermont
- Maintained by: Town of Montgomery
- ID number: VT-06-09

Characteristics
- Design: Covered, Town lattice
- Material: Wood
- Total length: 58 ft 9 in (17.91 m)
- Width: 16 ft 6 in (5.03 m)
- No. of spans: 1
- Load limit: 8 tons
- Clearance above: 9 ft 5 in (2.87 m)

History
- Constructed by: Sheldon and Savannah Jewett
- Construction end: 1883
- West Hill Covered Bridge
- U.S. National Register of Historic Places
- Location within Vermont Location within the United States
- Coordinates: 44°52′02″N 72°38′53″W
- Area: 1 acre (0.40 ha)
- NRHP reference No.: 74000221
- Added to NRHP: December 31, 1974

The West Hill Covered Bridge, also known as the Crystal Springs Covered Bridge is a wooden covered bridge that crosses West Hill Brook on Creamery Bridge Road in Montgomery, Vermont. It is one of six surviving 19th-century bridges built in Montgomery by the brothers Sheldon & Savannah Jewett. It was listed on the National Register of Historic Places in 1974.

== Description ==
The West Hill Covered Bridge stands in a rural area about 3 miles (4.8 km) south of Montgomery's village center, carrying Creamery Bridge Road across West Hill Brook west of Hill West Road. It is a single-span Town lattice truss, 59 feet (18 m) long and 19.5 feet (5.9 m) wide, with a roadway width of 16 feet (4.9 m) (one lane). It is covered by a gabled roof, and its exterior is finished in vertical board siding, which is wrapped around to the insides of the portals. The siding ends before the roof eaves, leaving an open strip. The bridge deck consists of wooden planking.

== History ==
The bridge was built by Sheldon & Savannah Jewett – brothers who built several bridges in the area, and had a farm and lumber mill nearby this area, where they prepared the lumber for the bridges they built. This bridge's date of construction is unknown; the Jewetts are known to have been active between about 1860 and 1890. Although not officially cited, this bridge also goes by the name of "Creamery Covered Bridge" due to a creamery that was located adjacent to the bridge site. Remains of the creamery are still visible in the woods next to the bridge.

Once a busy area, the location which the bridge served was slowly abandoned. The bridge and the road leading up to it fell into serious disrepair, and the bridge was closed in 1994. A complete renovation was carried out by Alpine Construction of Schuylerville, New York in 2009. A comprehensive series of articles chronicling the work can be found at the Vermont Covered Bridges web site. Despite the renovation of the bridge, the road as it approaches the bridge from either direction is little more than a one-lane, loose-gravel and rock path which is closed seasonally. The remote location has unfortunately allowed many acts of graffiti to be carried out inside the bridge.

== See also ==
- National Register of Historic Places listings in Franklin County, Vermont
- List of Vermont covered bridges
- List of bridges on the National Register of Historic Places in Vermont
