= Fuller Covered Bridge =

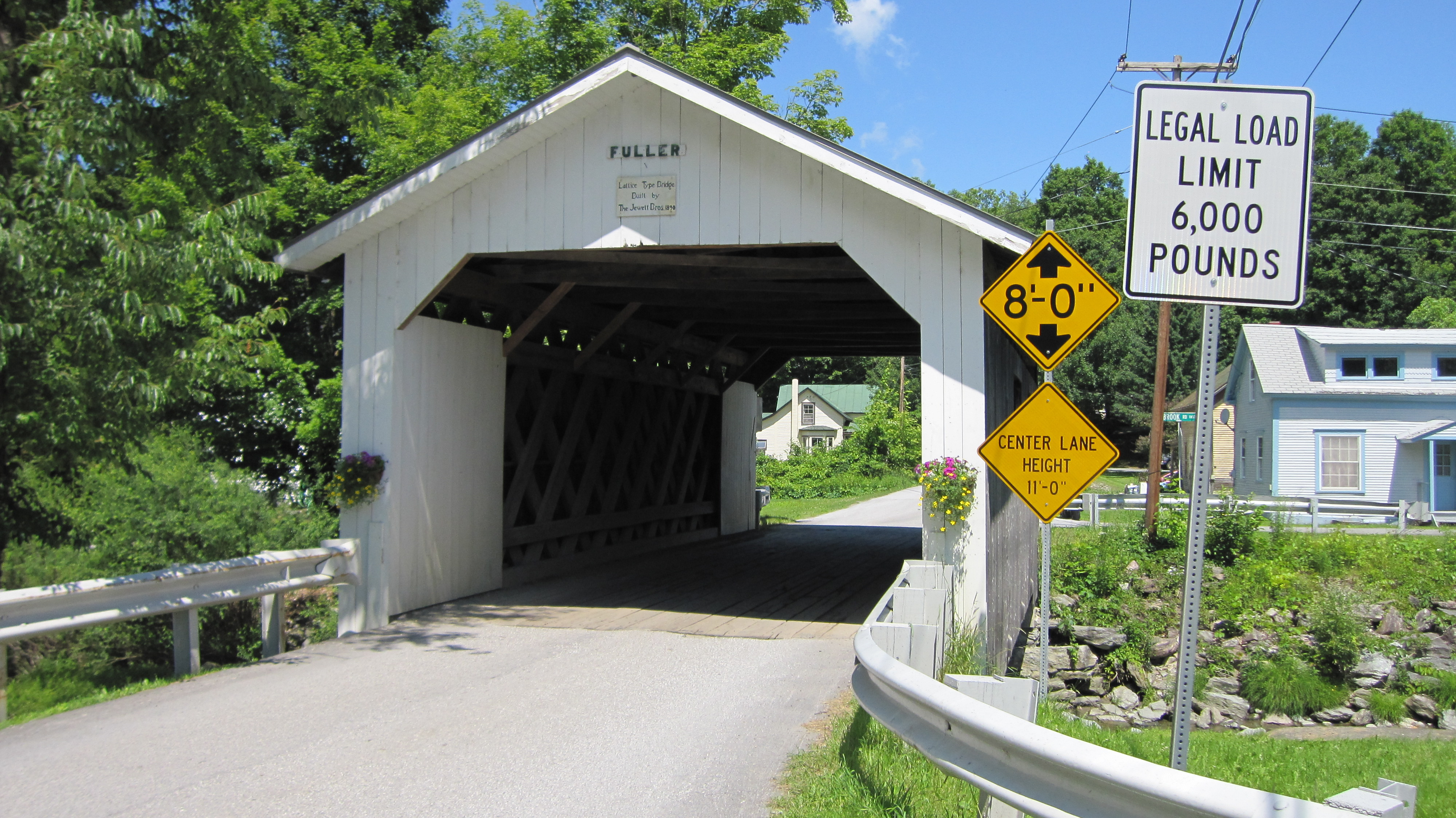
- Bridge in U.S. state of Vermont
- Coordinates: 44°54′11″N 72°38′24″W
- Carries: Automobile
- Crosses: Black Falls Brook
- Locale: Montgomery, Vermont
- Maintained by: Town of Montgomery
- ID number: VT-06-05

Characteristics
- Design: Covered, Town lattice
- Material: Wood
- Total length: 49 ft 6 in (15.09 m)
- Width: 16 ft 4.75 in (5.00 m)
- No. of spans: 1
- Load limit: 3 tons
- Clearance above: 11 ft 0 in (3.35 m)

History
- Constructed by: Sheldon and Savannah Jewett
- Construction end: 1890
- Fuller Covered Bridge
- U.S. National Register of Historic Places
- Location within Vermont Location within the United States
- Coordinates: 44°54′12″N 72°38′23″W
- Area: 1 acre (0.4 ha)
- NRHP reference No.: 74000216
- Added to NRHP: December 23, 1974

The Fuller Covered Bridge, also known as the Blackfalls Covered Bridge is a wooden covered bridge that crosses Black Falls Brook in Montgomery, Vermont on Fuller Bridge Road. It was listed on the National Register of Historic Places in 1974. The bridge is one of a concentrated regional collection built by brothers Sheldon & Savannah Jewett.

== Description and history ==
The Fuller Covered Bridge is located on the north side of Montgomery village, on Fuller Bridge Road (a continuation of South Richford Road), just north of its junction with Black Falls Road. The bridge is a single-span Town lattice truss, 49.5 feet (15.1 m) long and 19.5 feet (5.9 m) wide, with a roadway width of 16 feet (4.9 m) (one lane). It rests on abutments of mortared stone, one of which has afterwards been faced in concrete. The bridge is covered by a metal gabled roof, and is sheathed in vertical board siding, which extends around a short distance into the portals. The deck is made of wooden planks.

The bridge was built in 1890 by Sheldon and Savannah Jewett, brothers who are credited with building Montgomery's other surviving covered bridges. This assemblage is one of the most concentrated in Vermont all attributable to a single builder. The Jewetts used standardized dimensions for their construction (except for the bridge length), and prepared wood for the bridges at their lumberyard in Montgomery's West Hill area.

The Fuller bridge underwent a restoration in 1981 but the very next year, at Christmas time, a logging truck destroyed the roof with its loading beam... the driver apparently oblivious to the fact. It may not have been known how the bridge had been damaged had the truck not passed the town garage with Christmas lights that had adorned the bridge and pieces of the roof dragging behind it. The trusses of the bridge were braced for the winter and repairs made the next year. In 1997 a flood threatened to wash the bridge out. In 2000, a complete reconstruction of the bridge was carried out by Blow & Cote of Morrisville, Vermont.

== See also ==
- National Register of Historic Places listings in Franklin County, Vermont
- List of Vermont covered bridges
- List of bridges on the National Register of Historic Places in Vermont
