= Trout River (Vermont) =

Location
- Country: United States
- State: Vermont
- County: Franklin County, Vermont

Physical characteristics
- Source: Confluence of Jay Brook and Wade Brook
  - location: Montgomery
  - coordinates: 44.875°N 72.580°W
- Mouth: Missisquoi River)
  - location: East Berkshire
  - coordinates: 44.935°N 72.704°W
  - elevation: 123 m (404 ft)
- Length: 10.7 km (6.6 mi)

Basin features
- Progression: Missisquoi River, Lake Champlain (via Missisquoi Bay), Richelieu River, Saint Lawrence River
- Tributaries
  - left: (upstream) 6 unidentified brooks, West Hill Brook, 2 unidentified brooks, South Branch Trout River, 1 unidentified brook, Wade Brook.
  - right: (upstream) 3 unidentified brook, Alder brook, 2 unidentified brooks, Black Falls Brooks, 2 unidentified brooks, Hannah Clark Brook, Jay Brook.

National Wild and Scenic River
- Type: Recreational
- Designated: December 19, 2014

The Trout River is a tributary of the Missisquoi River, flowing successively in municipalities of Montgomery, in Enosburg and in East Berkshire, in Franklin County, in northern Vermont in the United States.

The Trout River Valley is served by North Main Street (VT 118) passing on the northeast bank of the river. While the upper part is served by Jay Mountain Road (route 242) (north side of the river) and by Hazens Notch Road (route 58) on the south side.

The surface of the Trout River is generally frozen from mid-December to mid-March, with the exception of the rapids; however, safe circulation on the ice generally takes place from late December to early March.

== Course ==
The Trout River rises at the confluence of Jay Brook (coming from East) and Wade Brook (coming from South-East) in Franklin County, Vermont, East of Montgomery, Vermont, at an altitude just shy of 365 metres (1,198 ft). This source is located at the North of the route 58 and south of route 242 (Mountain Road).

From its source, the Trout River flows over 10.7 kilometres (6.6 mi) mainly in agricultural area except the crossing of Montgomery Center and crossing the Missisquoi & Trout Wild and Scenic River, with a drop of 242 metres (794 ft), according to the following segments:

- 1.6 kilometres (0.99 mi) towards west, by collecting the Hannah Clark brook (coming from North-East), crossing the route 242 (Mountain Road) in the middle of Montgomery Center, up to the mouth of South Branch Trout River (coming from South);
- 3.6 kilometres (2.2 mi) towards the northwest, following more or less the route route 118 (North Main Street), passing south of the village of Montgomery, crossing the North Main Street, up to Black Falls Brook (coming from the north-east);
- 2.9 kilometres (1.8 mi) towards the northwest, doing a loop to the southwest and crossing the North Main Street, then branching north, crossing the Longley Bridge Road, going shortly along the Main North Street (on south side), branching west in order to collect a brook (coming from southwest), then curving to northwest, entering Enosburg and doing some serpentines, up to Alder Brook (coming from East);
- 2.0 kilometres (1.2 mi) at first towards the north going along with North Main Street (on the west side), doing a loop to the North after crossing the Hopkins Bridge Road, branching to the ouest, then to the northwest entering in East Berkshire, up to the route 118;
- 0.6 kilometres (0.37 mi) towards the northwest, doing two serpentines, up to the mouth.

The mouth of the Trout River is emptying on the south shore of Missisquoi River, right downstream of a river elbow. From there, the current goes generally westward on 66.3 km (41.2 mi) up to eastern shore of Lake Champlain.

== Toponymy ==
The toponym "Trout River" was registered on October 29, 1980, in the USGS (US Geological Survey).

== See also ==
- Franklin County, Vermont
- South Branch Trout River
- Missisquoi River
- Lake Champlain
- Richelieu River
- List of rivers of Vermont
