= Vermont Route 118 =

Highway in Vermont

Vermont Route 118
- Map of northern Vermont with VT 118 highlighted in red

Route information
- Maintained by VTrans
- Length: 28.549 mi (45.945 km)

Major junctions
- South end: VT 100 in Eden
- North end: VT 108 in Berkshire

Location
- Country: United States
- State: Vermont
- Counties: Lamoille, Franklin

Highway system
- State highways in Vermont
← VT 117	→ VT 119

Vermont Route 118 (VT 118) is a state highway in the U.S. state of Vermont. The highway runs 28.549 miles (45.945 km) from VT 100 in Eden north to VT 108 in Berkshire. VT 118 connects several towns in northern Lamoille County and eastern Franklin County, including the covered bridge–rich town of Montgomery. The town of Berkshire maintains the highway north of VT 105.

== Route description ==
VT 118 begins at VT 100 in the town of Eden. The highway heads north along two-lane Belvidere Road, which crosses the Frying Pan River as the route follows the stream to its source, a mountain pass in which the highway intersects the Long Trail. VT 118 descends west to Belvidere Pond, one of the headwaters sources of the North Branch Lamoille River, and crosses the pond's outlet immediately before entering the town of Belvidere. The highway crosses Calavale Brook and the North Branch proper at the T-intersection of Belvidere Corners, where VT 109 continues west while VT 118 turns north. VT 118 follows the North Branch to its source and crosses the Lamoille–Franklin county line and enters the town of Montgomery just north of the source of the Trout River. The highway follows the river north, crosses Pacific Brook, and passes near the Hectorville Covered Bridge and the Hutchins Covered Bridge in the namesake hamlets.

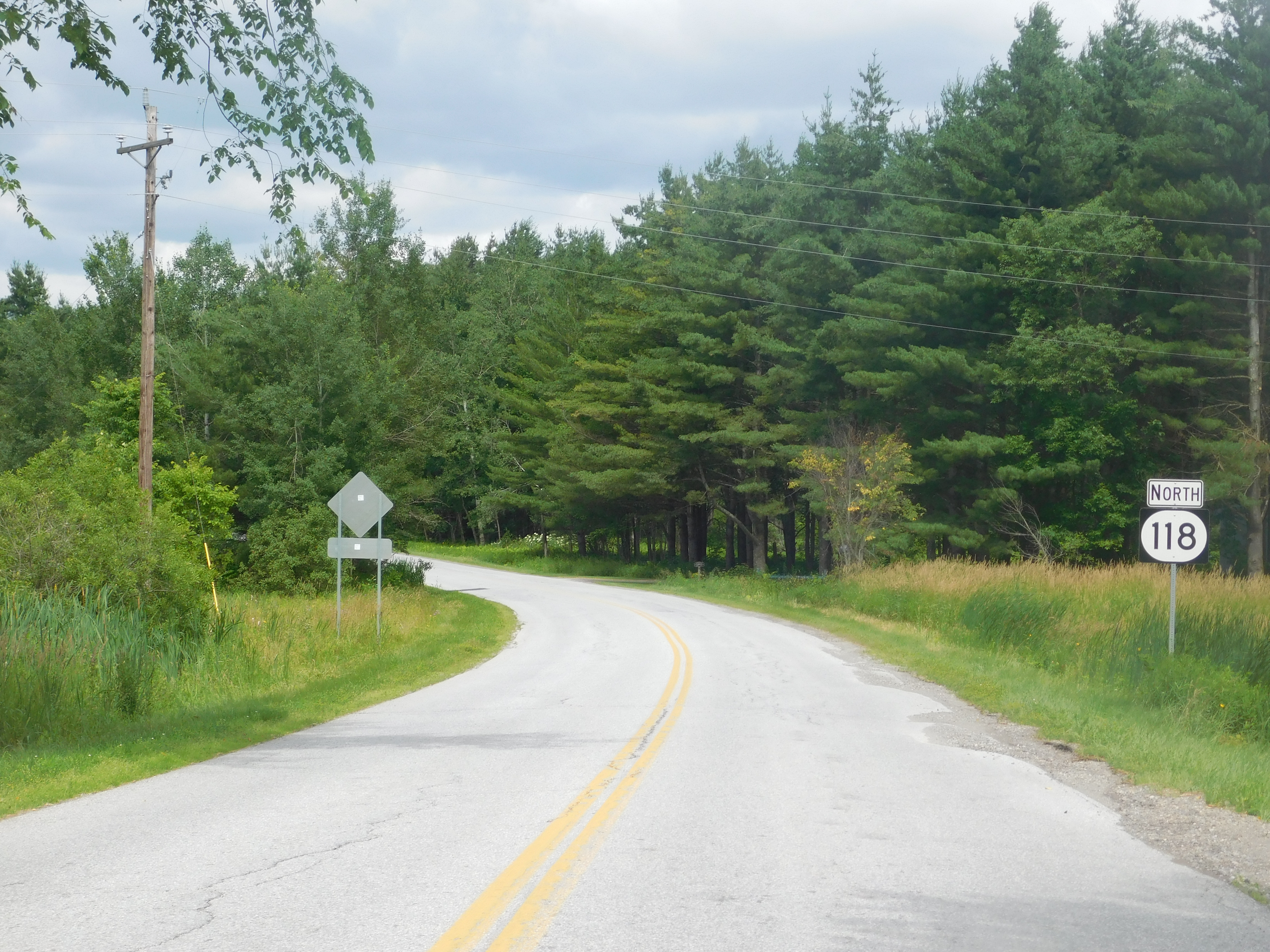
VT 118 in Berkshire

VT 118 continues north to Montgomery Center, where the highway crosses the Trout River between its closely spaced junctions with the west end of VT 58 (Hazens Notch Road) and VT 242 (Mountain Road). The highway continues northwest through the river valley to the village of Montgomery, which contains the historic Montgomery House, St. Bartholomew's Episcopal Church, and the Fuller Covered Bridge. Leaving the village, VT 118 passes near the Comstock Covered Bridge and crosses the South Branch Trout River twice between a crossing of West Hill Brook. The highway passes the Longley Covered Bridge and then the Hopkins Covered Bridge while passing through the northeast corner of the town of Enosburg. VT 118 enters the town of Berkshire as Montgomery Road, which crosses the Trout River and then the Missisquoi River west of its confluence with the Trout River. At the north end of the bridge, the highway has a T-intersection with VT 105 in the village of East Berkshire.

VT 118 briefly runs concurrently with VT 105 before splitting northwest onto Berkshire Center Road, which immediately intersects the Missisquoi Valley Rail Trail. VT 118 heads northwest through the village of Berkshire Center, where the highway meets Water Tower Road and Richford Road. The highway crosses the Pike River and passes the historic West Berkshire School before reaching its northern terminus at VT 108 (West Berkshire Road). The town of Berkshire maintains the portion of VT 118 north of VT 105; the Vermont Agency of Transportation maintains the Eden–East Berkshire portion of the highway.

== Major intersections ==
County	Location	mi	km	Destinations	Notes
Lamoille	Eden	0.000	0.000	VT 100 – Eden Mills, Lowell, North Hyde Park, Morrisville	Southern terminus
Lamoille	Belvidere	6.615	10.646	VT 109 south – Belvidere Center, Jeffersonville	Northern terminus of VT 109
Franklin	Montgomery	14.571	23.450	VT 58 east (Hazens Notch Road) – Lowell	Western terminus of VT 58
Franklin	Montgomery	14.609	23.511	VT 242 east (Mountain Road) – Jay Peak Ski Area, Jay	Western terminus of VT 242
Franklin	Berkshire	21.799	35.082	VT 105 east – Richford	Northern end of state-maintained segment; southern end of concurrency with VT 105
Franklin	Berkshire	21.889	35.227	VT 105 west – Enosburg Falls, West Berkshire, St. Albans	Southern end of town-maintained segment; northern end of concurrency with VT 105
Franklin	Berkshire	28.549	45.945	VT 108 – Franklin, Enosburg Falls	Northern terminus
1.000 mi = 1.609 km; 1.000 km = 0.621 mi: Concurrency terminus
