= Jay Peak Resort =

Ski area in Vermont, United States

- Interactive map of Jay Peak Resort
- Location: Jay, Vermont
- Nearest city: Burlington, Vermont
- Coordinates: 44°55′46″N 72°31′56″W
- Status: Operating
- Owner: Pacific Group Resorts
- Vertical: 2,153 feet (656 m)
- Top elevation: 3,862 feet (1,177 m)
- Base elevation: 1,815 feet (553 m)
- Skiable area: 385 acres (1.56 km^{2})
- Trails: 81
- Longest run: 4.828 kilometres (3.000 mi)
- Lift system: 9 (1 Aerial tramway, 6 chairs, 2 surface lifts)
- Snowfall: 359 inches (911.86 cm); 29.9 feet (9.11 m)
- Website: www.jaypeakresort.com

Jay Peak Resort is an American ski resort located on Jay Peak in the northern Green Mountains, between Jay, Vermont and Montgomery Center, Vermont. Its vertical drop of 2,153 feet (656 m) is the eighth largest in New England and the fifth largest in Vermont. Although mostly located in the town of Jay, part of the resort, including the summit of Jay Peak, the Jet Triple Chair area, and much of the Big Jay backcountry descent, is located in the town of Westfield, Vermont, to the south. The northernmost part of the resort is located 4 miles (6.5 km) south of the border with Quebec, Canada.

The resort opened for skiing in 1957 and later expanded to year-round activities. The mountain offers 81 trails served by nine lifts. It receives the most snowfall of any ski area in the Northeastern U.S. and is known for its gladed skiing.

In 2008, Jay Peak Resort was purchased by a group of investors headed by Ariel Quiros and the resort's CEO, Bill Stenger. They raised money from EB5 investors and undertook a major expansion of the resort's facilities, adding, among other things, new hotels, condos, an ice rink and a water park. In 2016, Jay Peak and another Vermont mountain, Burke Mountain Ski Area, were seized by U.S. government officials amid investigations regarding fraudulent offerings of securities. Quiros and Stenger pleaded guilty and received prison sentences.

The resort was operated under US government receivership for more than six years, and in 2022 it was purchased by Pacific Group Resorts, Inc., with proceeds going to the defrauded EB5 investors.

== History ==
=== First half century ===
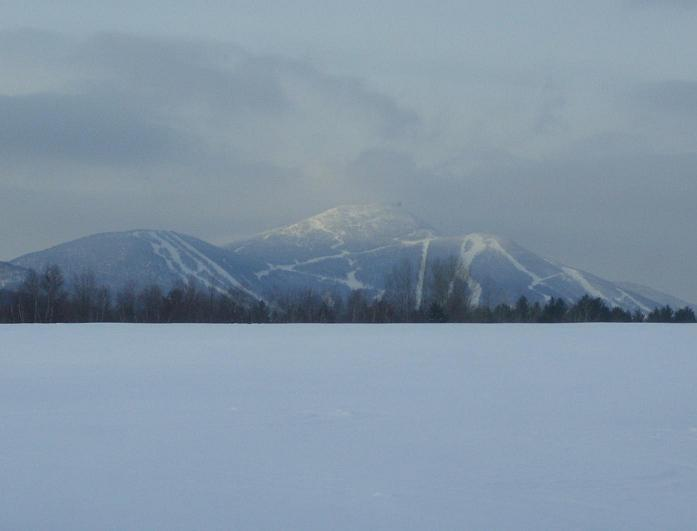
View of Jay Peak from the north, showing many of its ski trails

Jay Peak was incorporated by Harold Haynes in 1955. That same year, the resort purchased its first ski lift, a T-bar, and in January 1957 it opened for skiing. Many ski trails were carved into the mountain during the 1950s by its first ski school director/general manager, Walter Foeger, an Austrian and former racer who had previously trained the Spanish Olympic ski team. In 1968 Weyerhaeuser invested $300,000 in the predecessor organization, Jay Peak, Inc., and loaned it $2.2 million. A 48-room hotel was built in the mid-1970s. In 1978 Mont Saint-Sauveur International, a Canadian firm, bought the resort.

In 2006, the resort employed 550 people in the winter, 100 in the summer. The following year, the resort agreed to pay the State of Vermont $105,000 for violating stormwater rules in polluting a stream while building a new golf course. Despite a drop in skier visits statewide during the 2006–2007 season, Jay Peak saw a record year with skier visits up 7%. In 2007–2008, the resort reported a record 320,000 skiers for the winter. In 2008, it was the second biggest employer in the area. In 2008, the resort was valued by the town of Jay at slightly over $12 million.

=== EB-5 fraud; water park, ice arena, hotel and other improvements ===
By 2008, the resort's owner, Mount Saint-Sauveur, began an EB-5 visa program to finance development. That year, a group headed by Miami businessman Ariel Quiros and the resort's CEO, Bill Stenger, purchased the resort. Before the purchase of Jay, Quiros claimed that he needed to verify the existence of the $18 million already raised by Mount Saint-Sauveur through the EB-5 program. He persuaded the sellers to put the funds into an account at Raymond James Financial, which employed his son-in-law, who helped to retitle the accounts in Quiros' name immediately before the closing of the sale of Jay. They transferred the funds to other accounts, misusing the EB-5 funds to pay part of the purchase price; they used more EB-5 funds raised later to complete the payments owed to Mount Saint-Sauveur.

The new resort company's plan was to invest $100 million in capital improvements for the resort over the next few years. The resort company raised $250 million by 2010, for improvements at Jay and other nearby projects and purchases, including Burke Mountain Ski Area, from 250 investors from 43 companies through the incentive of the EB-5 program. Under this visa program, every $500,000 invested in the U.S. that results in ten new jobs gains the investor permanent U.S. residence. Separately from that program, but as part of its ongoing planning, the resort engaged in a three-way swap with the State of Vermont in 2010. The State deeded 59.8 acres (24.2 ha) to the resort. The resort relinquished its lease to a 418 acres (169 ha) parcel of nearby undeveloped forest back to the state and sold 166 acres (67 ha) to the Green Mountain Club to ensure that the nearby 3.5 miles (5.6 km) of Long Trail would have a permanent buffer from ski-area development.

In 2010, $13 million worth of improvements at Jay were completed including an indoor ice arena, a parking garage, an enclosed beginners surface lift, and a new RFID ticketing system. The old Hotel Jay was razed and replaced with a new 170-room hotel. The new facilities also include a spa, conference center, movie theatre and 33,000 square feet (3,066 m^{2}) water park. Also in 2010, Yankee magazine named Jay as the best ski resort in New England. In 2011, the resort agreed to pay an $80,000 fine to the United States Environmental Protection Agency for filling in 2 acres (0.81 ha) of wetlands to construct a golf course in 2004–2006, without a permit from the U.S. Army Corps of Engineers. This was the same event for which the resort had paid a fine to the state in 2007. Over the ensuing years, the resort repeatedly postponed plans to expand its skiing terrain to a new area to be known as the West Bowl; it is not clear whether the resort ever obtained the support of the state to conduct the necessary cutting and construction in the forest.

By 2014, some EB-5 investors had complained to the Vermont Department of Financial Regulation (DFR) and the U.S. Securities and Exchange Commission (SEC) that the resort company had abruptly reclassified their investments. The investigators found the resort company's answers to their questions about the use of the funds to be evasive. They eventually found that Quiros had diverted millions of the dollars raised for his personal use and that Stenger had lied to investors and the SEC about, among other things, the status of some of the construction projects, some of which were never built, including a biotechnology plant in Newport, Vermont.

On April 14, 2016, Jay Peak and Burke Mountain were seized by U.S. government officials. The resort remained operational under management of an SEC-designated receiver, Michael Goldberg, and acting CEO Steve Wright, who was previously Jay Peak's marketing director. On January 15, 2019, Goldberg announced that the resort had been offered for sale. The SEC recovered $81 million from Quiros (including the ski area assets), who pleaded guilty in 2020 to federal crimes including wire fraud, money laundering and obstructing investigators. He was sentenced to five years in prison. Stenger cooperated with the investigation and pleaded guilty in 2021 to supplying false statements to federal investigators. He was sentenced to 18 months in prison (but served 10 months) and a further 3 years of home confinement, and he was fined $250,000. A third conspirator, William Kelly, also received fines and a prison sentence. Raymond James Financial paid a $150 million settlement for its part in the fraud.

=== 2022–present; purchase by Pacific Group Resorts ===
As of 2022, Jay Peak employed more than 1,200 people in the winter and about half that number year-round; profits increased, during the receivership, from $2 million to $10 million annually.

In September 2022, after operating the resort for more than six years, Goldberg conducted an auction of the resort in which the winner was Pacific Group Resorts, Inc. of Park City, Utah, with a bid of $76 million. The sale was approved by the federal court, which ordered that approximately $70 million of the purchase funds were to be distributed to the defrauded EB-5 investors, representing about 40% of their original investments. The transaction was completed in November 2022. Pacific stated that it had no plans to make "major changes" to winter operations at the resort.

In February 2024, five Jay Peak Resort employees working in the water park under the J-1 visa program were fired by the resort after posting a photo of themselves on social media wearing home-made Swastika armbands and giving a Nazi salute.

== Trails and lifts ==
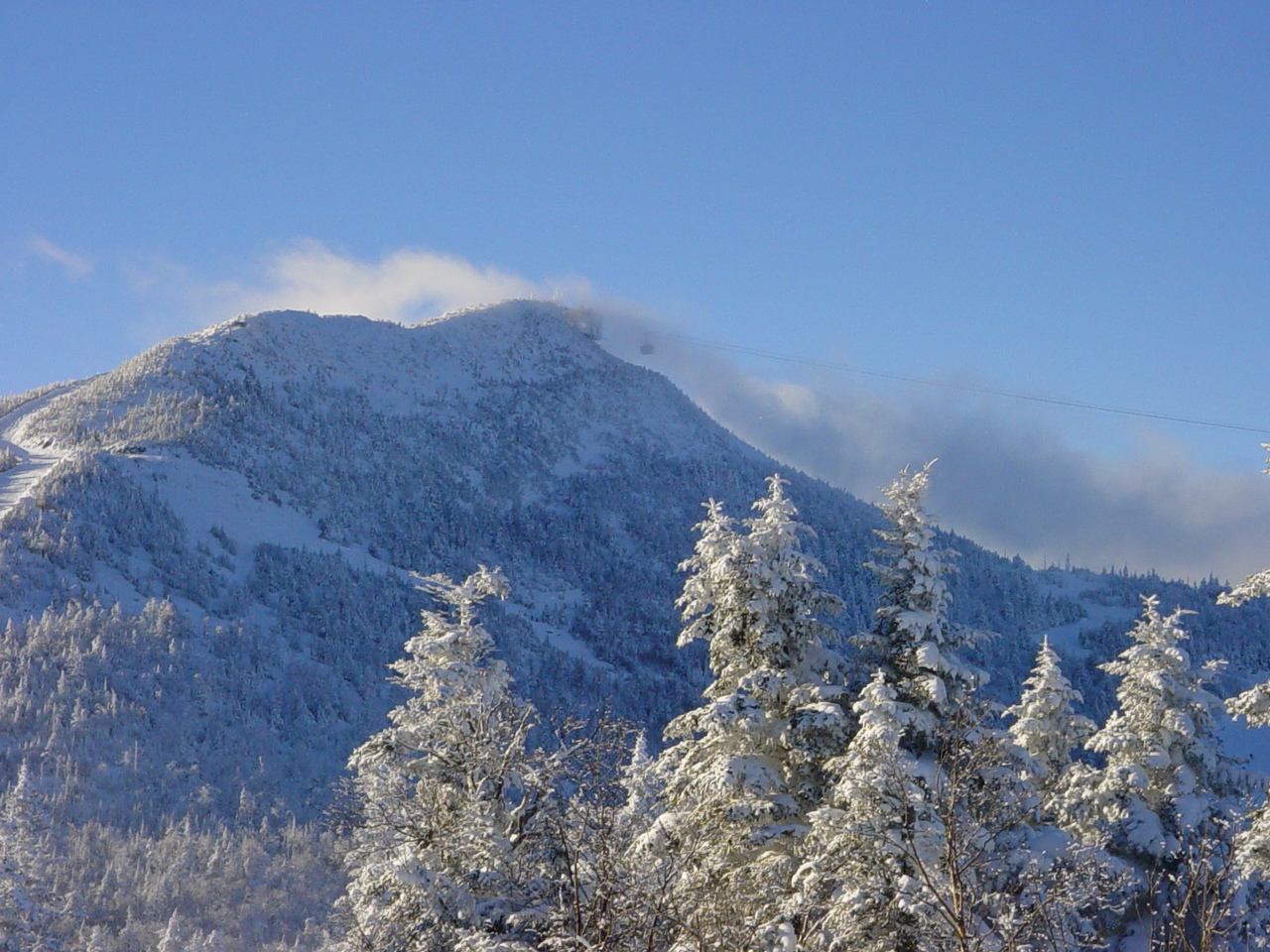
The summit, showing a Tram on the cable near at the top

As of 2024, the mountain offers 81 trails covering nearly 385 acres (156 ha) of skiable terrain. About two dozen of these are off-piste tree-skiing areas, or glades, covering approximately 100 acres (40 ha). Jay Peak is home to the "Face Chutes," arguably the most challenging and steepest marked terrain in the east with an average slope of 56.5 percent (almost 30°) and a maximum slope of 73.9 percent (37°). The "Face Chutes" consist of four skiable lines, the most challenging being the 3 lines to skier's right, all of which are extremely narrow and include a mandatory cliff drop. The ski area is known for its gladed skiing.

Jay Peak has a lift fleet consisting of an aerial tram, six chairlifts and two magic carpet surface lifts. It is one of two ski resorts on the east coast that has an aerial tram, the other being Cannon Mountain in New Hampshire.

Lift Name	Type	Manufacturer	Built	Vertical (feet)	Length (feet)	Notes
Aerial Tram	Tram 60	VonRoll / Garaventa	1966	1,969	7,779	Cabins were replaced in 2000; it was retrofitted in 2017.
Flyer Express Quad	High Speed Quad	Leitner	1999	1,620	7,350	The Flyer is the only detachable quad on the mountain.
Bonaventure	Quad	Doppelmayr USA	1987	1,340	4,650	
Metro	Quad	Doppelmayr USA	2002	486	2,855	Relocated from Sugarbush Resort in 2002.
Taxi	Quad	Doppelmayr USA	2012	325	1,756	
Jet	Triple	Doppelmayr USA	1985	1,160	3,500	
Village	Double	Hall / Borvig	1995	331	2,371	Relocated from Camelback Mountain in Pennsylvania.

The mountain has a total uphill capacity of approximately 12,820 skiers/hour. The oldest of the lifts, the 60-person aerial tramway, also known as the "tram", is the only one of its type in the State of Vermont. This tramway was originally installed in 1966 by Von Roll and upgraded in 2000 with new cabins from Garaventa.

In 1985, the resort purchased the Jet Triple chair from Doppelmayr to replace a T-Bar. This was followed in 1987 with the purchase of the Bonaventure Quad which replaced a double chairlift. In 1999 the resort removed the Green Mountain Double chair, which had serviced the north side of the mountain for 30 years, and replaced it with the Green Mountain Flyer (dubbed the "Green Mountain Freezer" by skiers because of its notoriously cold ride due to the strong winds blowing on it), the mountain's first high-speed detachable chairlift. The other five lifts serve the lower mountain terrain.

In May 2016 the state raised concerns over the safety of the aerial tramway, which resulted in $4.5 million worth of electronic upgrades and carriage overhauls. The capacity of the two tram cars was reduced from 60 to 45 at this time.

To gain access to the lifts, an RFID system scans a chip embedded in a plastic card which is typically held in the skier's pocket.

== Snowfall ==
The summit is at an elevation of 3,862 feet (1,177 m), with a 2,153 foot (656 m) vertical drop. Jay Peak has the largest average annual snowfall of any ski area in Eastern North America. The resort states its annual snowfall at 359 inches (9.1 metres), while the Zrankings ski resort data site calculates it at 322 inches, excluding October and May snow, writing: "Jay Peak's location near the northern tip of the Green Mountains and its proximity to large bodies of water means it often catches moist air. As this moist air is forced upwards by the mountain's topography, it cools and condenses, leading to snowfall, a process known as orographic lift.

The resort's record total for snowfall occurred in the 2016–2017 season, amounting to 491 inches, which was nearly equaled in the 2024–25 season, with 475 inches of snowfall.

== Other facilities ==
The resort has two base lodges and a small lodge at the summit where the aerial tram terminates. There are also hotel facilities and a large number of ski-in/ski-out condominium units on the lower part of the mountain.

Features at Jay include a league-sized hockey rink, the Ice Haus, with room for 700 spectators. Next to it is a 220 space parking garage, where 80% of the slots are covered. In 2011, an indoor water park named The Pump House opened. It features the longest "lazy river" in Vermont. The resort also has a cross-country ski center, an 18-hole championship golf course, athletic fields, and a recreation center with climbing walls and a movie theater.
