= Berkshire, Vermont =

- Town
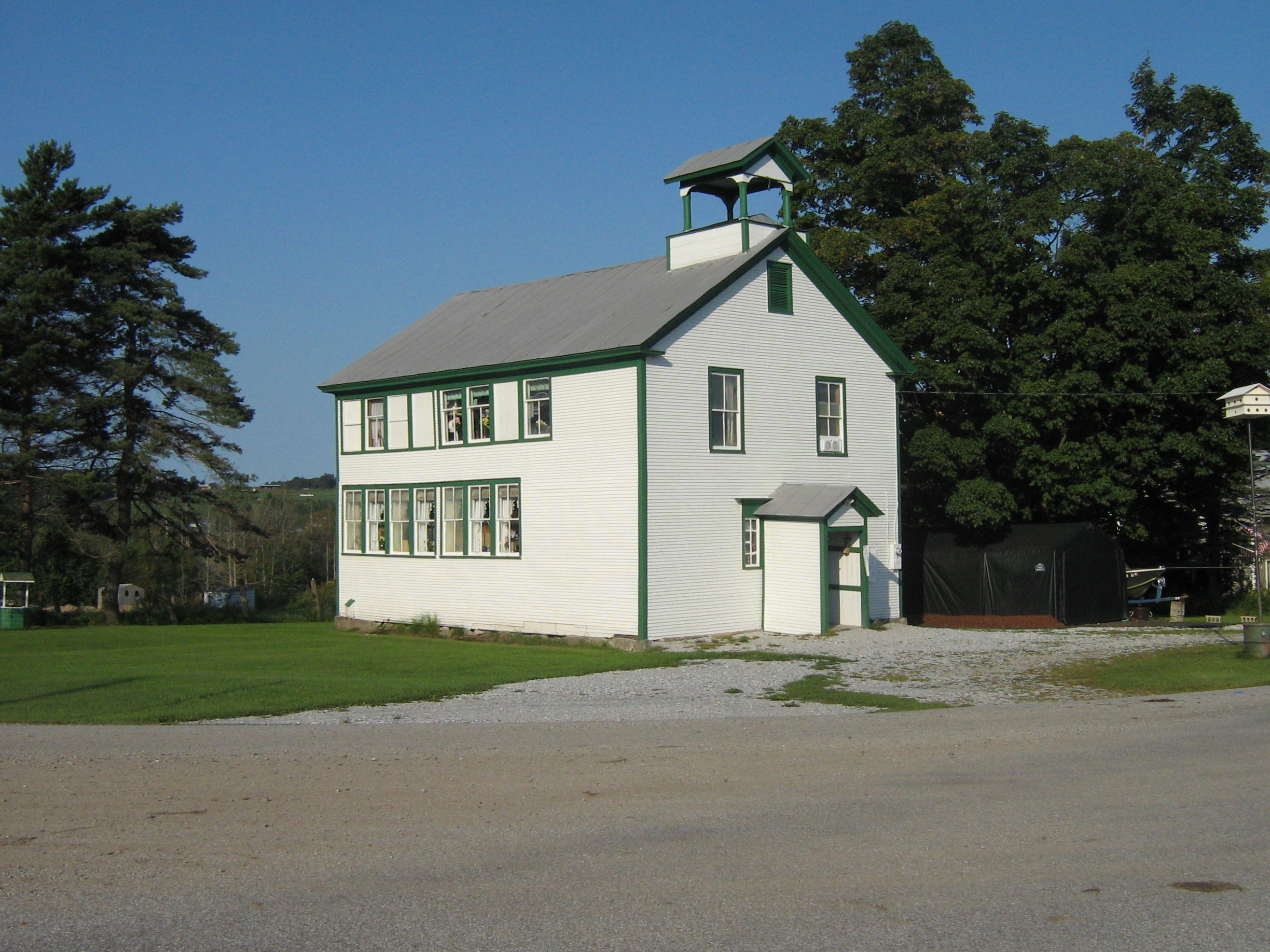
- The West Berkshire School

- Location in Franklin County and the state of Vermont
- Coordinates: 44°58′50″N 72°45′30″W
- Country: United States
- State: Vermont
- County: Franklin
- Communities: Berkshire; East Berkshire; West Berkshire

Area
  - Total: 42.2 sq mi (109.4 km^{2})
  - Land: 42.0 sq mi (108.8 km^{2})
  - Water: 0.23 sq mi (0.6 km^{2})
- Elevation: 814 ft (248 m)

Population (2020)
  - Total: 1,547
  - Density: 37/sq mi (14.2/km^{2})
- Time zone: UTC-5 (Eastern (EST))
  - Summer (DST): UTC-4 (EDT)
- ZIP Codes: 05447 (East Berkshire); 05450 (Enosburg Falls); 05476 (Richford)
- Area code: 802
- FIPS code: 50-05425
- GNIS feature ID: 1462041
- Website: www.berkshirevt.com

Berkshire is a town in Franklin County, Vermont, United States. The population was 1,547 at the 2020 census. It contains the unincorporated village of East Berkshire.

== Geography ==
Berkshire is located in northeastern Franklin County. Its northern boundary is the Canada–United States border.

According to the United States Census Bureau, the town has a total area of 42.2 square miles (109.4 km^{2}), of which 42.0 square miles (108.8 km^{2}) is land and 0.2 square miles (0.6 km^{2}), or 0.54%, is water. The Missisquoi River, a tributary of Lake Champlain, flows westward across the southeast corner of the town.

== Demographics ==
Historical population
Census	Pop.	Note	%±
1800	172		—
1810	918		433.7%
1820	831		−9.5%
1830	1,308		57.4%
1840	1,818		39.0%
1850	1,955		7.5%
1860	1,890		−3.3%
1870	1,609		−14.9%
1880	1,596		−0.8%
1890	1,421		−11.0%
1900	1,326		−6.7%
1910	1,286		−3.0%
1920	1,299		1.0%
1930	1,234		−5.0%
1940	1,156		−6.3%
1950	1,063		−8.0%
1960	965		−9.2%
1970	931		−3.5%
1980	1,116		19.9%
1990	1,190		6.6%
2000	1,388		16.6%
2010	1,692		21.9%
2020	1,547		−8.6%
U.S. Decennial Census

As of the census of 2000, there were 1,388 people, 495 households, and 376 families residing in the town. The population density was 32.9 people per square mile (12.7/km^{2}). There were 550 housing units at an average density of 13.0 per square mile (5.0/km^{2}). The racial makeup of the town was 97.55% White, 0.58% African American, 0.50% Native American, and 1.37% from two or more races. Hispanic or Latino of any race were 0.50% of the population.

There were 495 households, out of which 39.2% had children under the age of 18 living with them, 62.8% were married couples living together, 8.5% had a female householder with no husband present, and 24.0% were non-families. 17.0% of all households were made up of individuals, and 6.5% had someone living alone who was 65 years of age or older. The average household size was 2.80 and the average family size was 3.15.

In the town, the population was spread out, with 28.4% under the age of 18, 7.3% from 18 to 24, 30.3% from 25 to 44, 24.9% from 45 to 64, and 9.1% who were 65 years of age or older. The median age was 36 years. For every 100 females, there were 105.6 males. For every 100 females age 18 and over, there were 100.0 males.

The median income for a household in the town was $37,059, and the median income for a family was $40,833. Males had a median income of $29,688 versus $19,545 for females. The per capita income for the town was $15,713. About 10.9% of families and 13.6% of the population were below the poverty line, including 13.2% of those under age 18 and 20.3% of those age 65 or over.

== Education ==
It is in the Franklin Northeast Supervisory Union.

== Notable people ==
- Lorenzo A. Babcock, legislator and attorney general in Minnesota Territory
- Silas Barber, member of the Wisconsin State Assembly
- Sereno W. Graves, politician
- Henry Leavens, member of the Wisconsin State Assembly
- Homer Elihu Royce, member of the United States House of Representatives
- Stephen Royce, governor of Vermont
- Horace Rublee, journalist, newspaper editor, politician, and diplomat
- Ray B. Thomas, college athlete and coach, officer in the U.S. Army Medical Corps
