= Montgomery, Vermont =

- Town
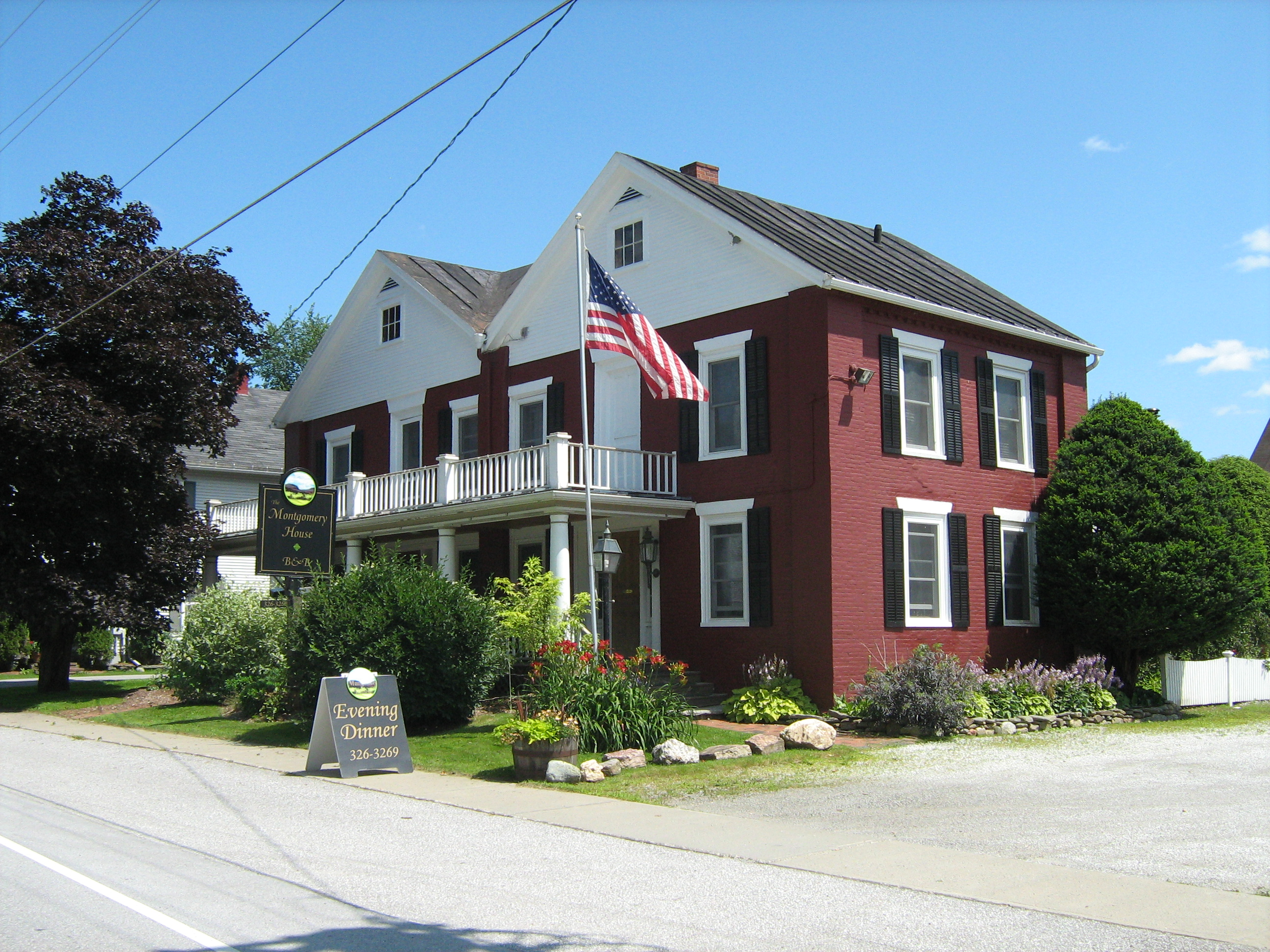
- Montgomery House

- Seal
- Nickname: "The Covered Bridge Town"
- Location in Franklin County and the state of Vermont
- Coordinates: 44°52′45″N 72°36′42″W
- Country: United States
- State: Vermont
- County: Franklin
- Communities: Montgomery; Montgomery Center; Hectorville; Hutchins; West Hill

Area
  - Total: 56.7 sq mi (146.9 km^{2})
  - Land: 56.6 sq mi (146.7 km^{2})
  - Water: 0.077 sq mi (0.2 km^{2})
- Elevation: 902 ft (275 m)

Population (2020)
  - Total: 1,184
  - Density: 21/sq mi (8.1/km^{2})
- Time zone: UTC-5 (Eastern (EST))
  - Summer (DST): UTC-4 (EDT)
- ZIP Codes: 05470 (Montgomery); 05471 (Montgomery Center); 05450 (Enosburg Falls); 05476 (Richford)
- Area code: 802
- FIPS code: 50-45850
- GNIS feature ID: 1462151
- Website: montgomeryvt.us

Montgomery is a town in Franklin County, Vermont, United States. The population as of the 2020 census was 1,184. In 1963, part of Avery's Gore in Franklin County became part of Montgomery, with the other section becoming part of Belvidere in Lamoille County. Montgomery is also known for having the most covered bridges of any town in Vermont, with seven. This amounts to one covered bridge for approximately every 170 residents, and is the most of any single town in the United States.

== Geography ==
The town is in eastern Franklin County, bordered to the south by Lamoille County and to the east by Orleans County. Vermont Route 118 passes through the town, leading northwest to Berkshire and south to Eden. Vermont Route 58 intersects Route 118 at Montgomery Center, leading southwest over Hazens Notch to Lowell. Vermont Route 242 also terminates at Montgomery Center, leading northeast over the Green Mountains to Jay. The higheast point in Montgomery is the 3,786-foot (1,154 m) summit of Big Jay, a spur of Jay Peak. Big Jay is in the northeast corner of Montgomery.

According to the United States Census Bureau, the town has a total area of 56.7 square miles (146.9 km^{2}), of which 56.6 square miles (146.7 km^{2}) is land and 0.1 square mile (0.2 km^{2}), or 0.13%, is water. Nearly all of the town is drained by the Trout River, a northwest-flowing tributary of the Missisquoi River. The southeast corner of the town is drained by Calavale Brook, a tributary of the Lamoille River. Both rivers flow to Lake Champlain.

The following are named villages and places in the town of Montgomery, according to the Vermont Secretary of State.

- Hectorville
- Hutchins
- Montgomery Center (ZIP Code 05471)
- Montgomery Village (ZIP Code 05470)

Hazen's Notch State Park is located on Vermont Route 58, the Hazen's Notch Road. The undeveloped park is located in three towns, including Montgomery. It is midway between Lowell to the east and Montgomery to the west.

== History ==
The town of Montgomery was granted a charter by the Vermont General Assembly on March 15, 1780. Montgomery was named in honor of General Richard Montgomery (1738–1775), an Revolutionary War leader who was the first American general to die in battle.

The Montgomery Historical Society was formed in 1974. The society was initially created to acquire and restore the St. Bartholomew's Episcopal Church in Montgomery Village.

The following buildings and bridges in Montgomery are listed on the National Register of Historic Places:

- Comstock Covered Bridge
- Fuller Covered Bridge
- Hectorville Covered Bridge (Disassembled and stored awaiting restoration)
- Hopkins Covered Bridge
- Hutchins Covered Bridge
- Longley Covered Bridge
- West Hill Covered Bridge
- Montgomery House (Montgomery, Vermont)
- St. Bartholomew's Episcopal Church (Now known as Pratt Hall, Montgomery Historical Society)
- First Baptist Church (Now known as Kelton Hall, Montgomery Center for the Arts)

In 2008, the state notified residents of the town, and twelve other towns in the adjacent counties of Lamoille and Orleans, that a review of health records from 1995 to 2006 had revealed that residents within 10 miles (16 km) of the former asbestos mine on Belvidere Mountain had higher than normal rates of contracting asbestosis. The state and federal government continues to study this problem. A critic replied that the entire basis of the study were three unidentified people who died from asbestosis from 1995 to 2005 out of a total population of 16,700.

== Government ==
The Montgomery Town Offices (Town Clerk, Select Board, etc.) are located at the Public Safety Building at 86 Mountain Road, Rte. #242, in Montgomery Center. The Montgomery Center Post Office is located at 98 Main Street in Montgomery Center (05471), and the Montgomery Village Post Office has its own post office located on 1 Black Falls Road, near the intersection of Fuller Bridge Road and Black Falls Road in Montgomery (05470).

== Legislators ==
The Essex-Orleans Senate district includes the town of Montgomery, as well as parts or all of Essex County, Orleans County, Franklin County and Lamoille County. As of 2021, it is represented in the Vermont Senate by Russ Ingalls (R) and Robert A. Starr (D).

== Demographics ==
Historical population
Census	Pop.	Note	%±
1800	41		—
1810	237		478.0%
1820	293		23.6%
1830	460		57.0%
1840	548		19.1%
1850	1,001		82.7%
1860	1,262		26.1%
1870	1,423		12.8%
1880	1,642		15.4%
1890	1,734		5.6%
1900	1,876		8.2%
1910	1,721		−8.3%
1920	1,658		−3.7%
1930	1,386		−16.4%
1940	1,208		−12.8%
1950	1,091		−9.7%
1960	876		−19.7%
1970	651		−25.7%
1980	681		4.6%
1990	823		20.9%
2000	992		20.5%
2010	1,201		21.1%
2020	1,184		−1.4%
U.S. Decennial Census

As of the census of 2000, there were 992 people, 412 households, and 288 families residing in the town. The population density was 17.5 people per square mile (6.7/km^{2}). There were 666 housing units at an average density of 11.7 per square mile (4.5/km^{2}). The racial makeup of the town was 96.88% White, 0.20% African American, 0.71% Native American, 0.10% from other races, and 2.12% from two or more races. Hispanic or Latino of any race were 0.50% of the population.

There were 412 households, out of which 28.4% had children under the age of 18 living with them, 55.8% were married couples living together, 7.5% had a female householder with no husband present, and 29.9% were non-families. 22.8% of all households were made up of individuals, and 7.3% had someone living alone who was 65 years of age or older. The average household size was 2.41 and the average family size was 2.75.

In the town, the population was spread out, with 23.6% under the age of 18, 5.6% from 18 to 24, 26.9% from 25 to 44, 30.3% from 45 to 64, and 13.5% who were 65 years of age or older. The median age was 42 years. For every 100 females, there were 101.6 males. For every 100 females age 18 and over, there were 102.1 males.

== Economy ==
Montgomery's economy centers on tourism due to its proximity to Jay Peak Resort. Agribusiness is also a significant contributor to the town's economy.

== Education ==
It is in the Franklin Northeast Supervisory Union.

== Personal income ==
The median income for a household in the town was $33,958, and the median income for a family was $38,839. Males had a median income of $27,917 versus $22,273 for females. The per capita income for the town was $16,570. About 8.7% of families and 14.4% of the population were below the poverty line, including 14.2% of those under age 18 and 8.9% of those age 65 or over.

== Notable people ==
- Dana Reed Bailey, politician
- Percival L. Shangraw, Vermont Supreme Court 1958–1974 (Chief Justice 1972–1974)
- Elle Purrier St. Pierre, Olympian
- Homer W. Wheeler, U.S. Army officer and author
