= Frank Lyman Austin =

American architect (1874–1942)

- Born: 1874; Burlington, Vermont, U.S.
- Died: 1942; Burlington, Vermont, U.S.
- Occupation: Architect

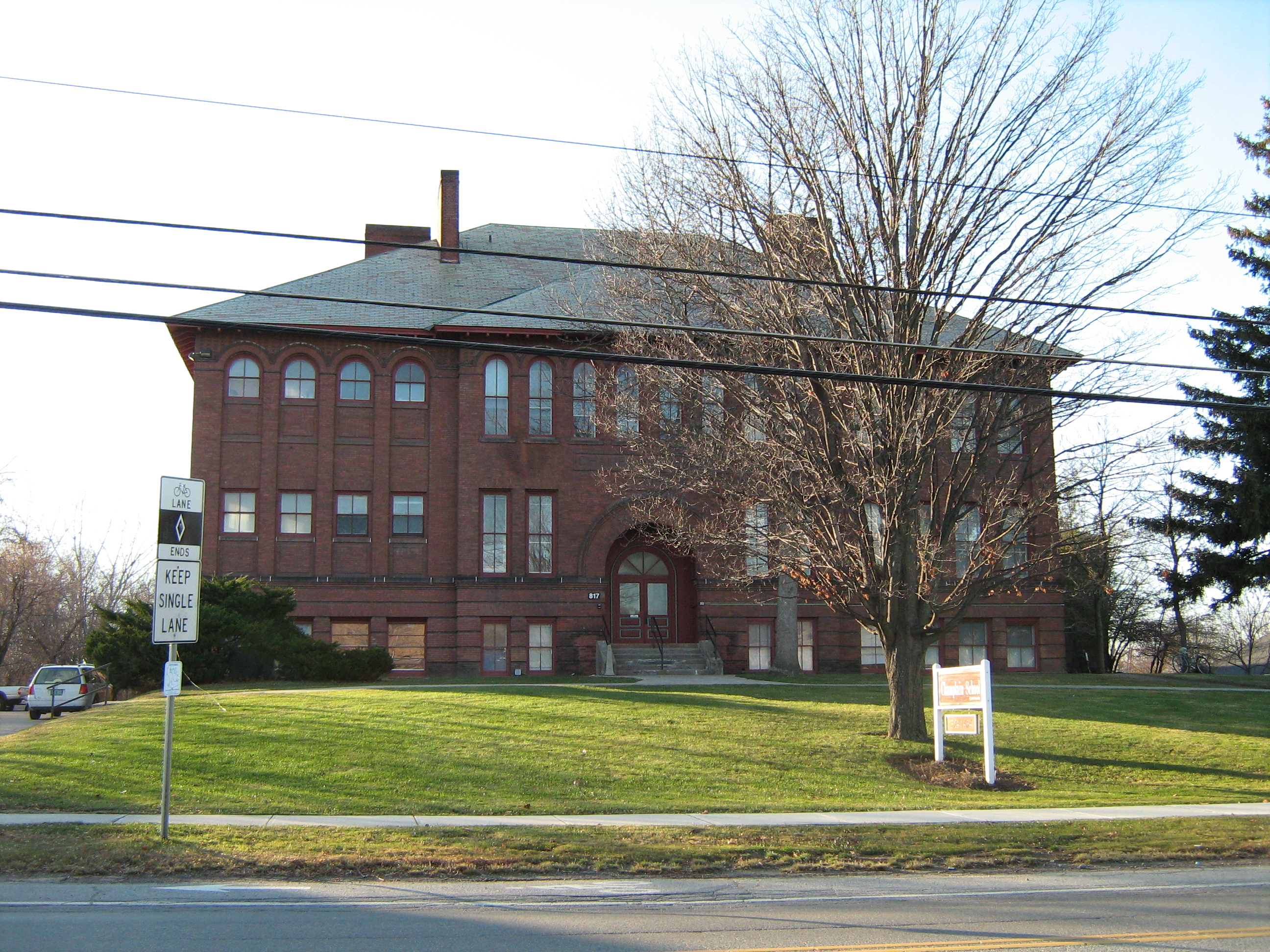
Champlain School, Burlington, 1909.

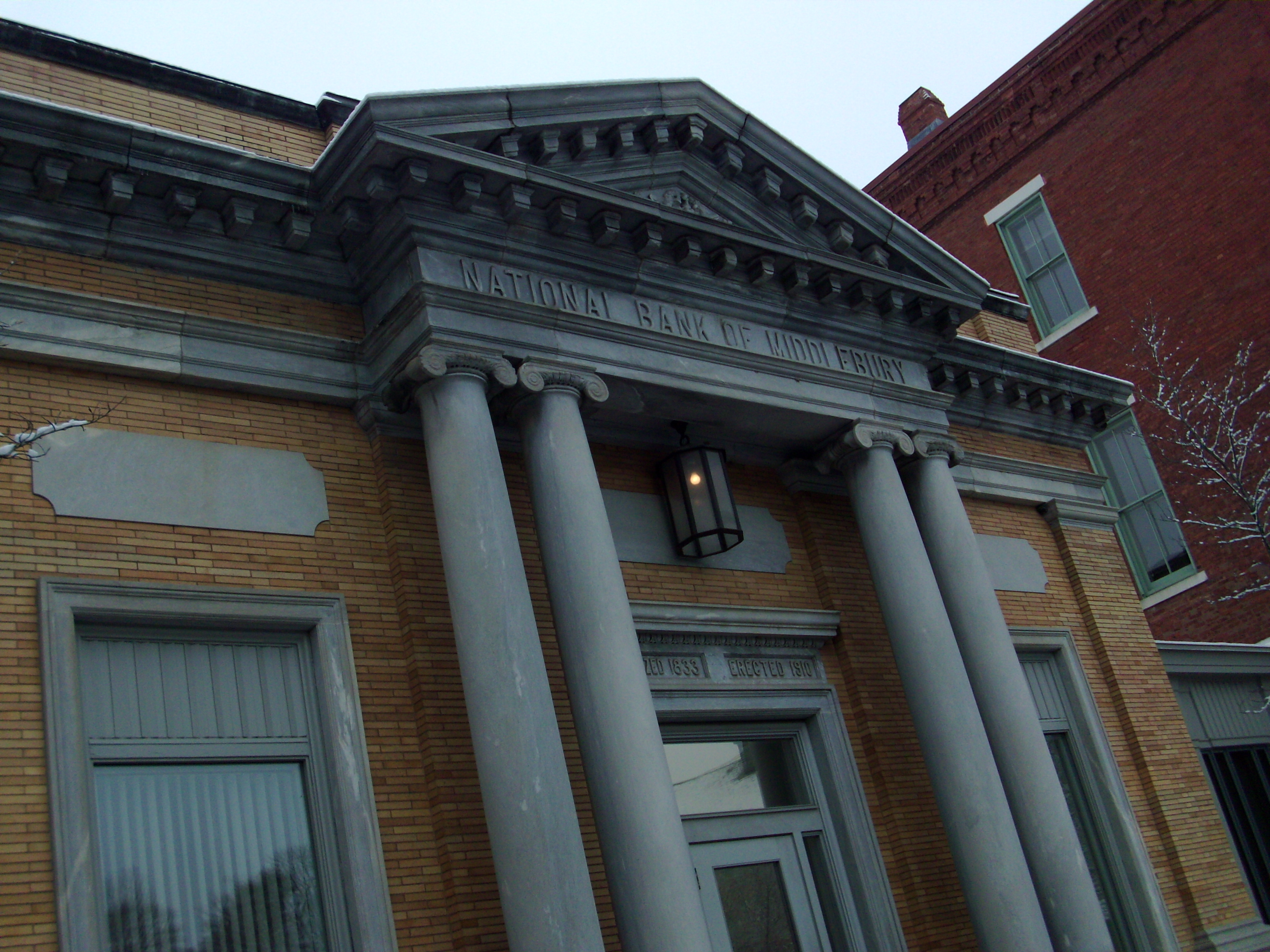
National Bank Building, Middlebury, 1910.

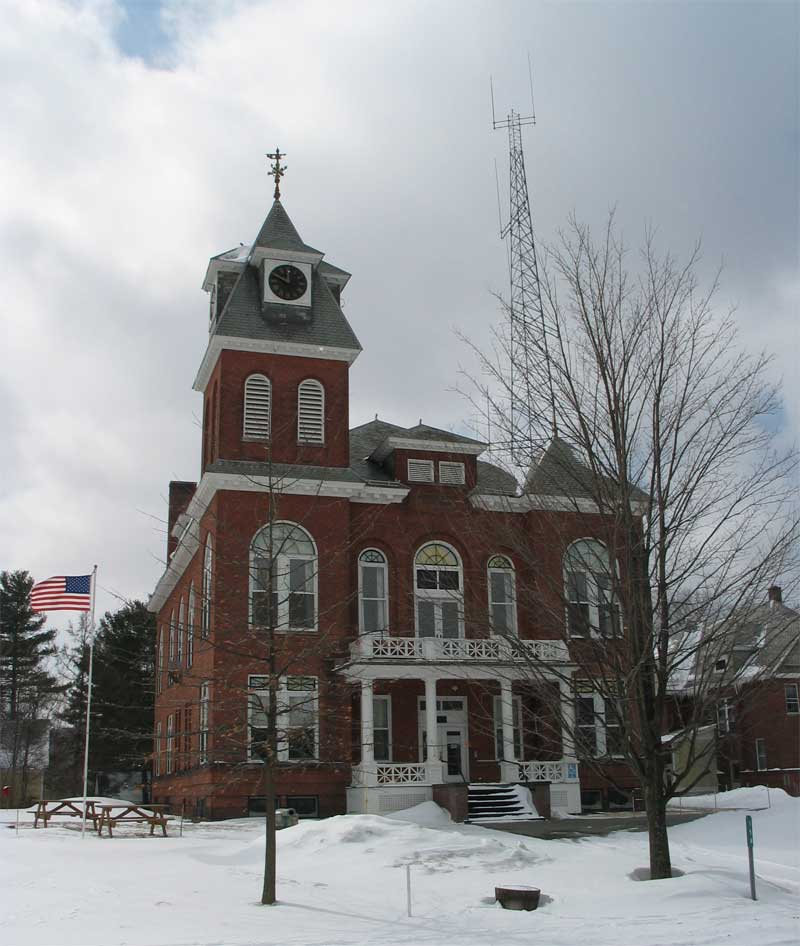
County Courthouse, Hyde Park, 1911.

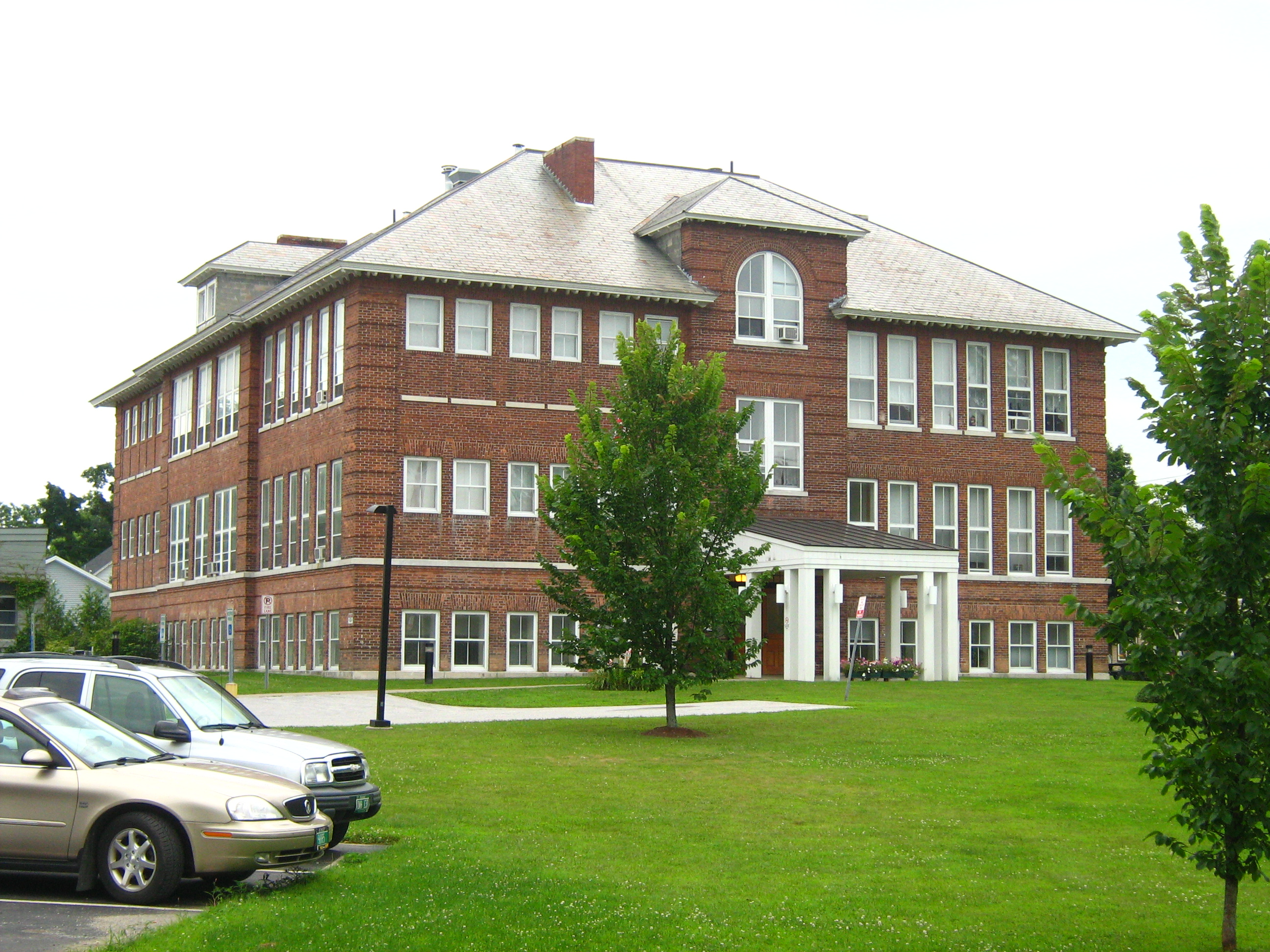
Swanton School, Swanton, 1912.

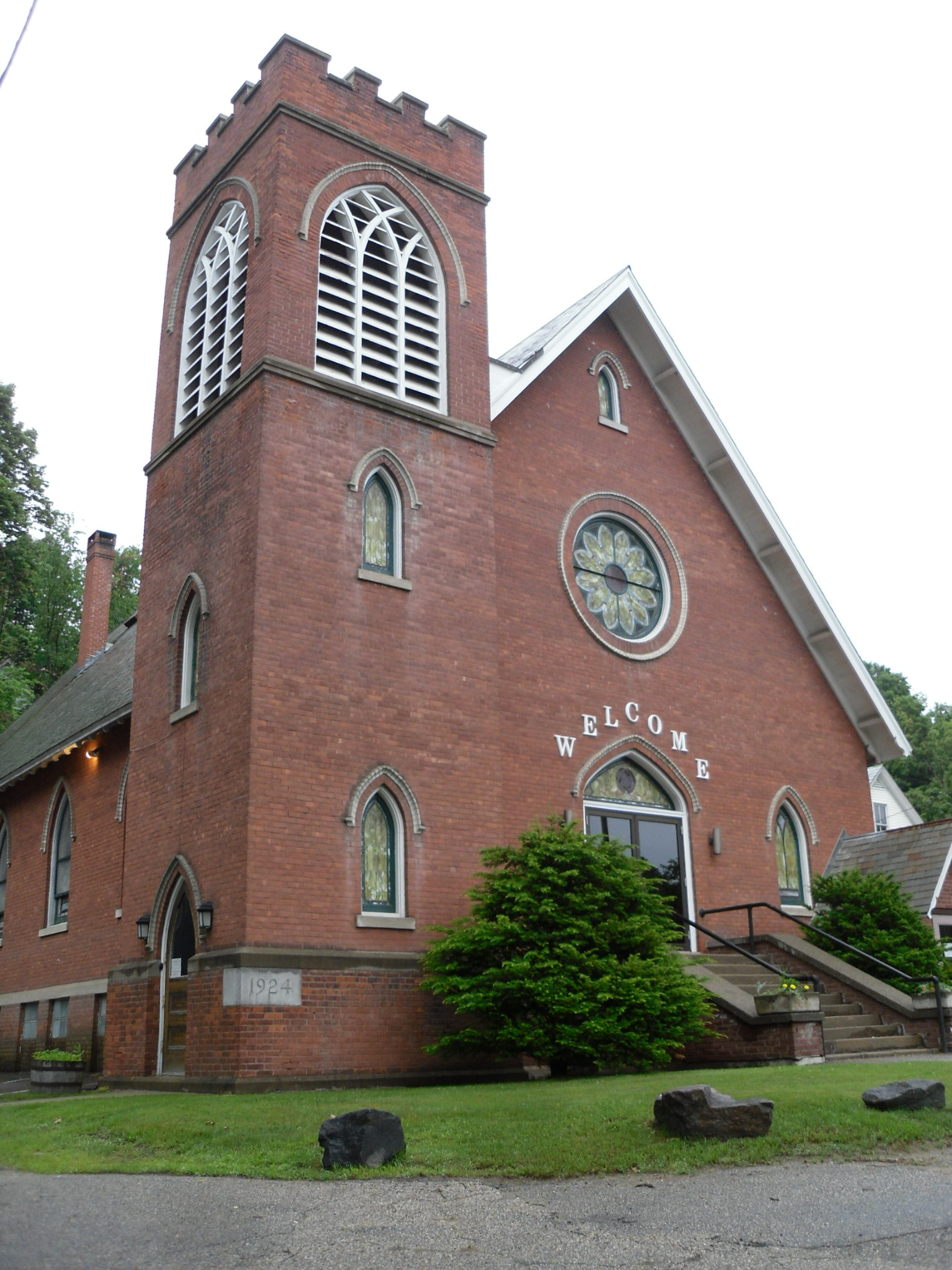
Calvary Baptist Church, Springfield, 1924.

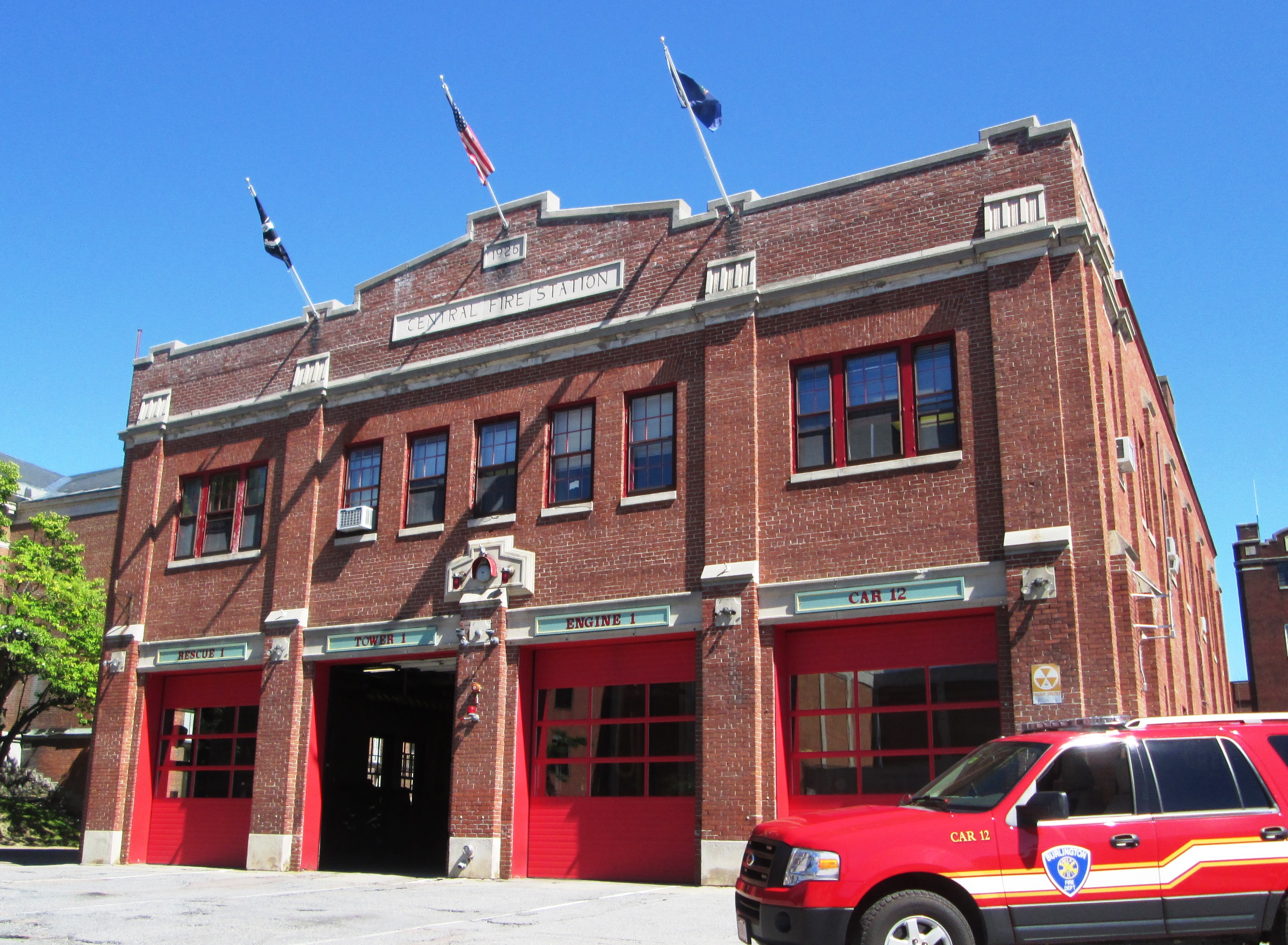
Central Fire Station, Burlington, 1926.

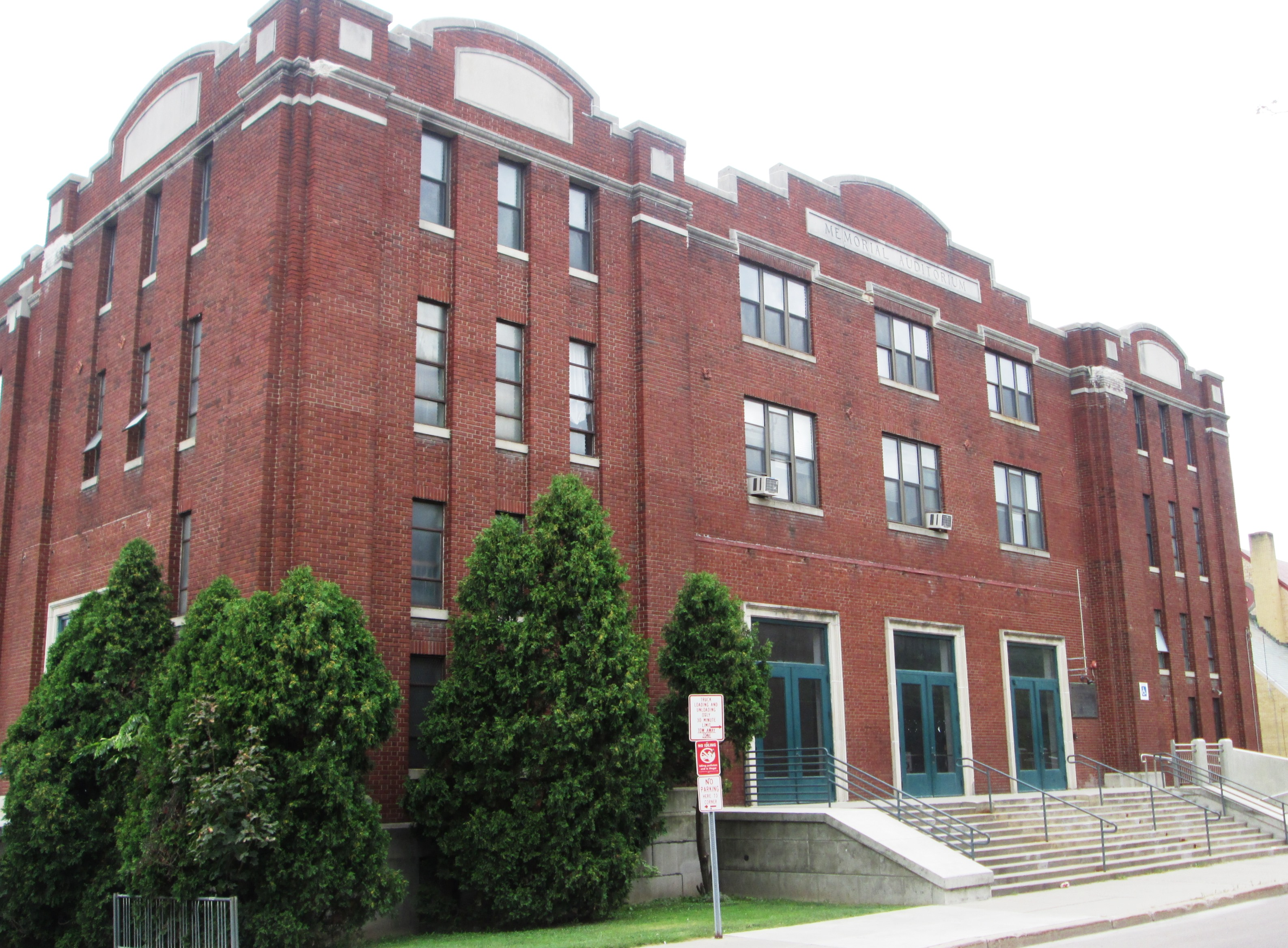
Memorial Auditorium, Burlington, 1927.

Frank Lyman Austin (1874—1942) was an American architect from Burlington, Vermont. He designed several buildings that have been placed on the National Register of Historic Places and others that are contributing buildings to listed historic districts.

== Life and career ==
Frank Lyman Austin was born in Burlington in 1874 to Zachary T. Austin, a local contractor. The Austin firm went back to around 1865, when Frank's grandfather, Lyman, established himself as a carpenter. Frank Austin worked in his father's office, and trained as an architect. In 1904, he left his father's firm and opened an office on his own account. Upon his father's death in 1910, Austin completed the leftover work and absorbed the firm's assets.

Austin's first significant work was the Champlain School of 1909, in Burlington. These small-scale beginnings soon grew into a large office, which resulted in the design of some of the city's (and state's) largest buildings. Eventually, Austin served as Vermont's state architect. In 1939, Austin's son, Lyman Dinsmoor Austin, became a partner in the firm. Upon Austin's death in 1942, his son dissolved the firm and left Burlington. Austin & Austin had been the oldest architectural firm in the state.

== Selected works ==
=== Frank Lyman Austin, 1904–1939 ===
- 1904 - Strong Theatre, 203 Main St, Burlington, Vermont
  - An addition to a pre-existing office building, demolished in 1970
- 1907 - Richmond High School, Richmond, Vermont
- 1908 - Masonic Temple, 58 Bridge St, Richmond, Vermont
- 1909 - Burlington Mutual Fire Insurance Building, 188 Main St, Burlington, Vermont
- 1909 - Champlain School (Old), 817 Pine St, Burlington, Vermont
- 1910 - Masonic Temple, 51 Washington St, Rutland, Vermont
- 1910 - National Bank of Middlebury Building, 32 Main St, Middlebury, Vermont
- 1910 - New Sherwood Hotel, 29 Church St, Burlington, Vermont
  - Burned in 1940.
- 1911 - Fairfield Street School, 72 Fairfield St, St. Albans, Vermont
- 1911 - Lamoille County Courthouse, 154 Main St, Hyde Park, Vermont
- 1912 - Colchester (Winooski) High School, 31 E Spring St, Winooski, Vermont
  - A carbon copy of the Champlain School. Demolished.
- 1912 - Swanton School, 21 Church St, Swanton, Vermont
- 1913 - Burlington City Hall (remodeling), 149 Church St, Burlington, Vermont
  - Demolished.
- 1914 - Richford Town Hall, 94 Main St, Richford, Vermont
- 1916 - St. Johnsbury State Armory, 1249 Main St, St. Johnsbury, Vermont
- 1917 - Milton S. Bostwick House, 63 Bank St, St. Albans, Vermont
- 1917 - Old Dorm, Vermont Technical College, Randolph, Vermont
- 1920 - Burnham Hall, 52 E River Rd, Lincoln, Vermont
- 1921 - Alumni Hall, Vermont Academy, Saxtons River, Vermont
- 1922 - Northfield State Armory, 61 Wall St, Northfield, Vermont
- 1923 - Ilsley Library, 75 Main St, Middlebury, Vermont
- 1924 - Calvary Baptist Church, 156 Main St, Springfield, Vermont
- 1925 - Burlington Jr. High School (Old), 299 Main St, Burlington, Vermont
- 1926 - Brownell Library, 6 Lincoln St, Essex Junction, Vermont
- 1926 - Central Fire Station, 136 S Winooski Ave, Burlington, Vermont
- 1927 - Burlington Memorial Auditorium, 250 Main St, Burlington, Vermont
- 1929 - Burlington State Armory, 60 Main St, Burlington, Vermont
- 1929 - West Rutland Public Library, 595 Main St, West Rutland, Vermont
- 1931 - Montpelier State Armory, 55 Barre St, Montpelier, Vermont
- 1932 - Y. M. C. A. Building, 266 College St, Burlington, Vermont
  - In association with James W. O'Connor, of New York
- 1935 - U. S. Post Office, 132 Main St, Springfield, Vermont

=== Austin & Austin, 1939–1942 ===
- 1939 - Elihu B. Taft School, 12 S Williams St, Burlington, Vermont
- 1941 - Gary Home, 149 Main St, Montpelier, Vermont
