= Burlington Memorial Auditorium =

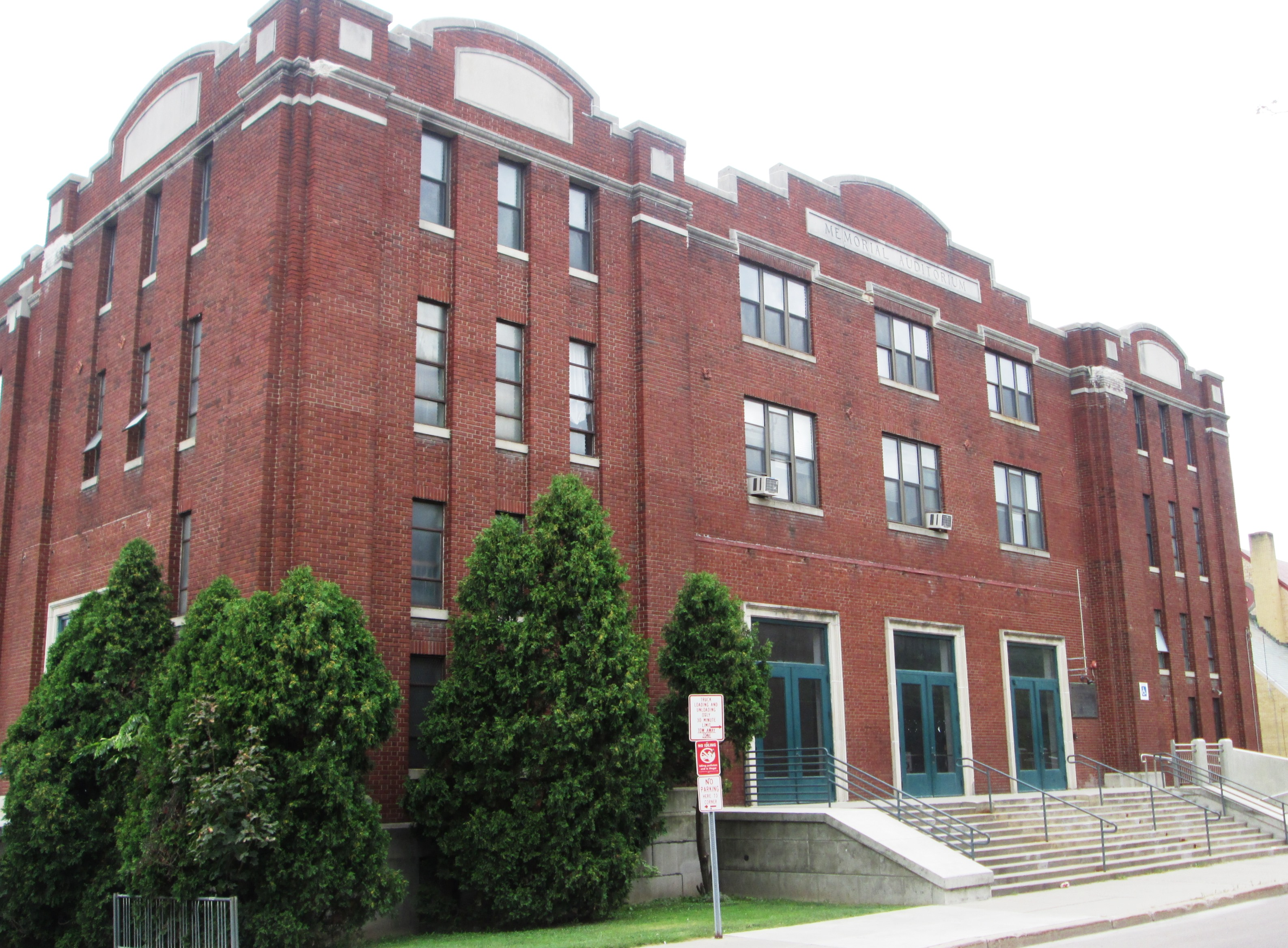

General information
- Type: auditorium/arena
- Architectural style: Art Deco/neoclassical
- Location: Burlington, Vermont, USA
- Coordinates: 44°28′35″N 73°12′34″W
- Construction started: 1927
- Completed: 1928
- Cost: US$204,629 (1928)
- Client: City of Burlington

Technical details
- Structural system: concrete, steel

Design and construction
- Architect: Frank Lyman Austin

Burlington Memorial Auditorium is a 2,500-seat multi-purpose National Register-listed arena, in Burlington, Vermont, United States. It was built in 1927–28 to designs of local architect Frank Lyman Austin, and is operated by the Burlington Department of Parks and Recreation. As a convention center, it offers 20,000 square feet (1,900 m^{2}) of space. The main space contains a 27-by-80-foot proscenium stage. The building also has two smaller event spaces. Since 2016, the building has been deemed structurally unsafe and has been closed to the public while the city determines how to renovate it and bring it up to modern building codes.

== History ==
=== Initial Planning ===
The city of Burlington redeveloped a significant portion of its downtown district during the mayoral administration of Dr. Clarence Beecher of 1925–29. Its impetus was actually as a memorial to Burlington's native sons who had fought in all American wars up to that point, and in particular the First World War. As of 1925, the city had no commemorative markers to honor its natives who had participated in the recent European conflict. Hence, on 19 September 1925, the editor of the Burlington Free Press, John L. Southwick, issued the first in a series of calls for the construction of a new building that would not only honor their service, but also serve as a convention center, generate income for the city, and make Burlington a more popular travel destination hosting special events. The financial backing for constructing a new auditorium was provided by a $750,000 bond that the city had secured.

By January 1926, Beecher's administration had developed a plan for building a new city hall with an attached auditorium, on the site of Stannard Memorial Hall on Church Street. A large percentage of Burlington residents favored the construction of a completely separate auditorium building, however, and by 3 February Beecher's office had developed a plan wherein $150,000 of the bond money could be used to build a standalone assembly space with a capacity of more than 3,000 people, to be designed by local architect Frank Austin, the author of numerous civic, institutional, and commercial buildings in Burlington, Middlebury, and surrounding communities. This proposal was approved through a referendum put to Burlington residents in early March. By April a site at the corner of Main and South Union Streets, the site of an old junior high school and an adjacent private house, had been purchased by the city for $14,000 and cleared for construction to begin.

=== Funding and Construction ===
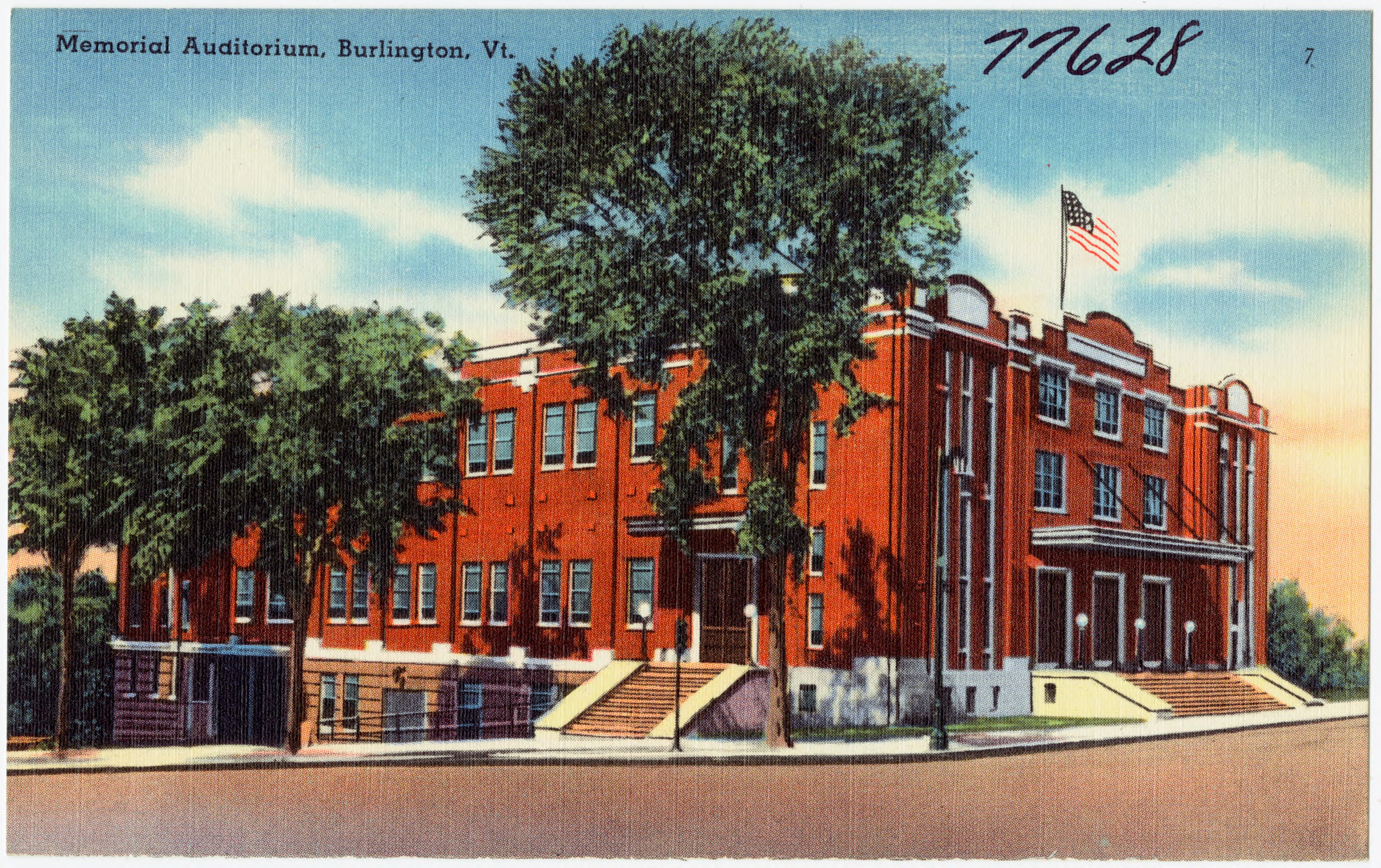
Burlington Memorial Auditorium on a postcard from the 1930s or '40s.

However, it soon became apparent that the cost of the new auditorium would be significantly larger than the original $150,000 allotted by the bond. This issue caused Austin to revise his plans several times, eliminating certain details and shrinking the size of the building's footprint, but these cost-cutting measures would not bring the cost down to fit into the original budget. Construction did not start until this issue was resolved, which continue to plague Beecher's administration throughout the remainder of 1926. Initially, estimates suggested another $30,000 from the original bond funds would need to be appropriated to cover the projected overruns, but by January 1926 the Burlington Free Press reported that these had increased to estimates of $50,000 or $60,000. Beecher's administration began to come under fire from the ex-mayor James E. Burke, who wrote an open letter to the editor in the Free Press on 20 January 1927 criticizing the cost of the new building. On 15 February Burke declared himself a candidate for mayor in the upcoming election, and eleven days later he issued a "Final Statement" in the newspaper, promising to air news of overdrafts taken by Beecher's administration to complete the arena and, on the other hand, to secure the additional necessary funds to complete the building.

On 2 March 1927, the Burlington Free Press publicly released Austin's plans for the auditorium, and during the next month and a half Beecher's administration determined that an extra $100,000 would be needed beyond the initial bond appropriation of $150,000 to complete the building as projected. On 15 April the issue for an extra bond was put to the voters of Burlington, who overwhelmingly approved the measure, supposedly with only one objection to the plan. A final estimate released four days later put the total cost of the building at $204,629 from the now $250,000 bond monies; the remainder would be retained by the city in case of further overruns and the bonds would be repaid at 4.5% interest within four years.

With funding secured, James E. Cashman was chosen as the building contractor, and work proceeded fairly swiftly. The roof was completed in December 1927 and the building ready for occupancy in early 1928. The building was inaugurated on 28 March 1928 with a dedication in front of a crowd of 3,000 people, attended by numerous Vermont dignitaries, which featured a speech by Governor John E. Weeks.

=== Subsequent Use ===
The auditorium predictably became a popular multipurpose space. In the first few months it hosted the Elks Charity Ball and the Burlington Firemen's Ball, concerts by the Burlington Symphony Orchestra and the 7th Field Artillery Military Band, a marionette show for children, and the Vermont Republican Party Caucus. On 18 May it hosted the University of Vermont Junior Prom.

Though equipped with a stage and proscenium, the building was also set up with a wood floor and basketball goals suitable for sporting events. The Northern District Basketball Tournament was held in 1938, while the Burlington Automobile Show was one of the earliest events held there in 1929. Dog shows and boxing matches took place in the basement. In June 1940 U.S. Presidential candidate Thomas E. Dewey spoke to a crowd reported as several thousand.

During the 1950s, the United States Immigration and Naturalization Service leased offices in the basement, presumably given Vermont's northern border with Canada not far away. Burlington's Welfare Department began distributing food to the needy from offices in the basement as well starting in March 1962.

During this time the arena also began to host big names in contemporary music. Bob Dylan performed at Memorial Auditorium; another performance by him in March 1967 was canceled and Simon & Garfunkel performed in his stead, returning for a second concert in October 1968. The latter performance was recorded and portions of it can be heard on Simon & Garfunkel's box set Old Friends, which, however, was not released until 1997. Before the latter show, the University of Vermont's Lane Series purchased a $5,000 concert shell to improve the acoustics. By the mid-1980s it had become a regular stop for most musical acts stopping in Burlington, including Metallica, Chuck Berry, Alice Cooper and Motörhead, Ricky Scaggs, Twisted Sister and Little Feat. Phish played several shows inside during their infancy in 1985 and 1986.

During the 1990s it hosted several episodes of Monday Night Raw and a couple episodes of WWF Superstars. On April 26, 1994, Fatu and Samu defeated Jacques and Pierre for the World Tag Team Championship, marking the only time a WWE title of any kind changed hands in Vermont.

For a time, Memorial Auditorium also served as one of the homes of the Vermont Frost Heaves, formerly of the PBL.

=== Historic Listing and Closure ===
In October 1988, Memorial Auditorium was listed on the National Register of Historic Places as a contributing building to the Main Street–College Street Historic District, which had been designated as part of a larger effort to protect the city's distinctive mixed commercial and residential core in the face of the broader movement of urban renewal that swept much of the United States during the 1960s, '70s, and '80s. From the 1990s onwards, the city's commitment to maintenance and repairs to the building, which of course annually weathers the harsh Vermont winters, began to wane. By 2012, the needed repairs to the structure had mounted to an estimated US$4 million.

In July 2016, the structure was deemed structurally unsafe for use or occupancy by the city engineer, requiring the two groups leasing it (the 242 Main youth center and Burlington City Arts Project) to move out. The city is current considering several options for restoration and refurbishment and has set up a dedicated website for community involvement and input.
