= Medals of Honor (Japan) =

Decoration by the Government of Japan

Medals of Honor 褒章
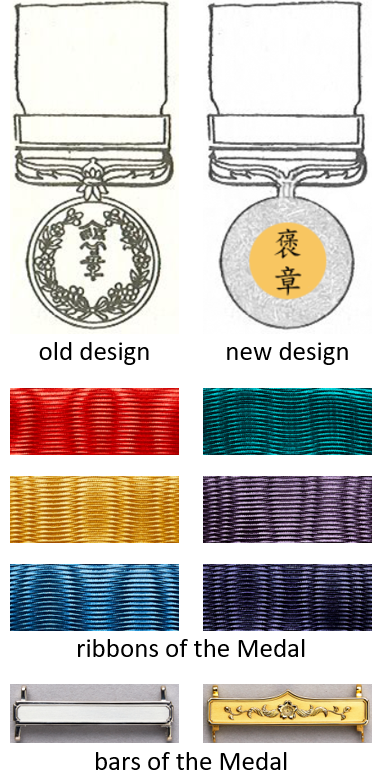
- Former and present medal designs, with respective ribbons
- Type: Civil decoration
- Awarded for: Meritorious deeds or excellence in the respective field of work
- Country: Japan
- Presented by: the Emperor of Japan
- Established: 7 December 1881
- First award: 1882
- Final award: 2024

Precedence
- Next (higher): Person of Cultural Merit

Medals of Honor (褒章, hōshō) are medals awarded by the Emperor of Japan. They are awarded to individuals who have done meritorious deeds and also to those who have achieved excellence in their field of work. The Medals of Honor were established on December 7, 1881, and were first awarded the following year. Several expansions and amendments have been made since then. The medal design for all six types is the same, bearing the stylized characters 褒章 on a gilt central disc surrounded by a silver ring of cherry blossoms on the obverse; only the colors of the ribbon differ.

If for some reason an individual were to receive a second medal of the same ribbon colour, then a second medal is not issued, but rather a new bar is added to their current medal. The Medals of Honor are awarded twice each year, on April 29 (the birthday of Emperor Shōwa) and November 3 (the birthday of Emperor Meiji).

== Types ==
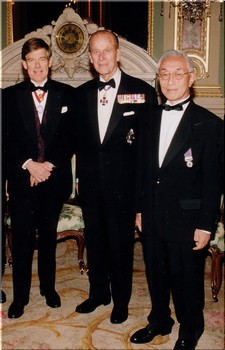
Hitoshi Narita stands at near right, wearing the Japanese Medal of Honor with purple ribbon. Dr. Narita stands with H.R.H. Prince Philip, Duke of Edinburgh (middle) and with the President of the Royal Academy of Engineering, Alec Broers, now Lord Broers (left). The three men were photographed on the evening of a formal dinner following Narita's election as a fellow of the academy in 2002.

=== Red ribbon ===
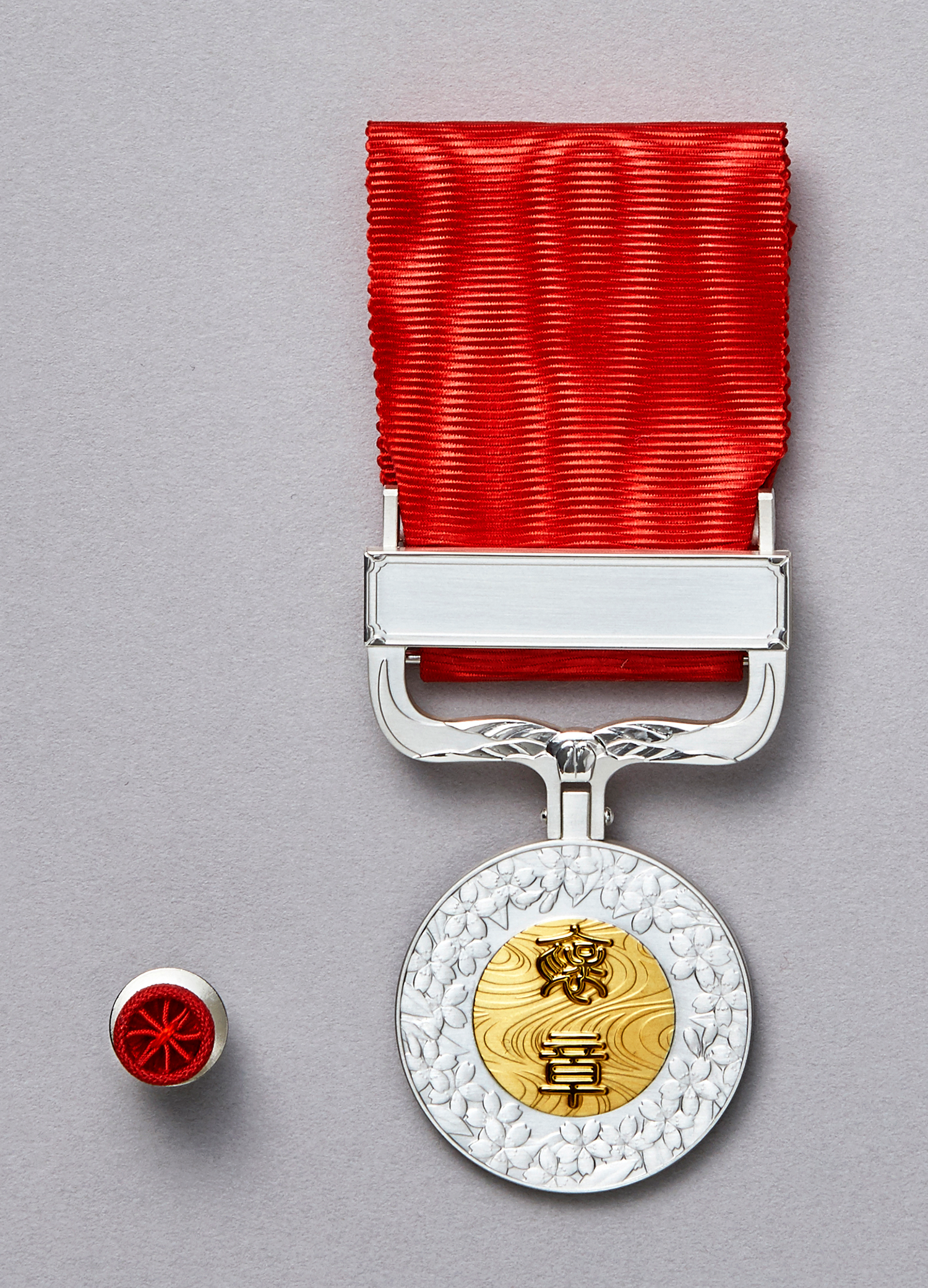
Current design of the Medal of Honor with Red Ribbon

First awarded in 1882. Awarded to individuals who have risked their own lives to save the lives of others.

=== Green ribbon ===
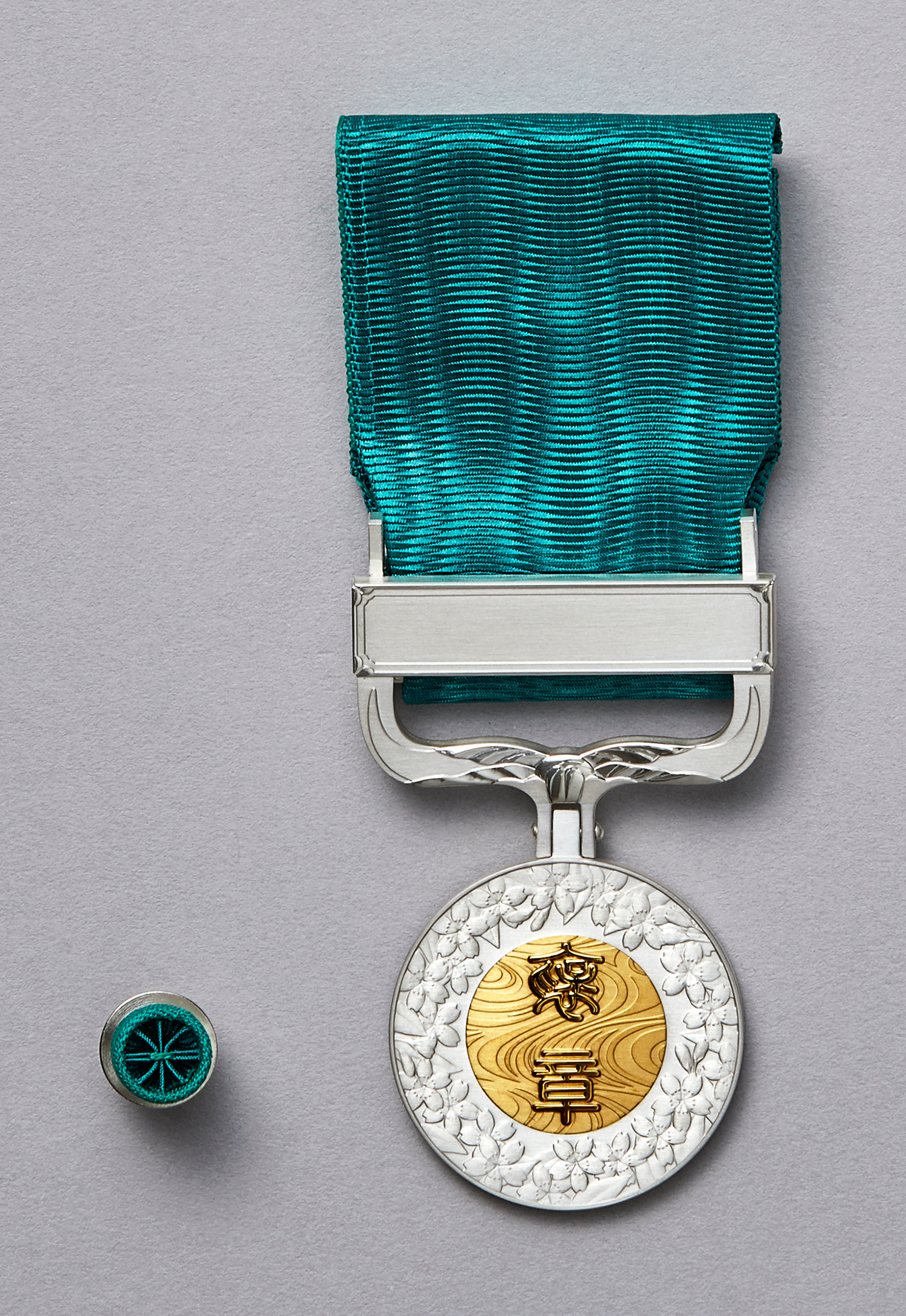
Current design of the Medal of Honor with Green Ribbon

First awarded in 1881. Originally awarded "to children, grandchildren, wives and servants for remarkable acts of piety; and to individuals who, through their diligence and perseverance while engaging in their professional activities, became public role models".

Changed social values after World War II had resulted in the conferment of this medal being suspended after 1950; since 1955 it has been replaced to some extent by the revived Medal with Yellow Ribbon (see below). However, in 2003 the Medal with Green Ribbon was revived as an award to morally remarkable individuals who have actively taken part in serving society.

=== Yellow ribbon ===
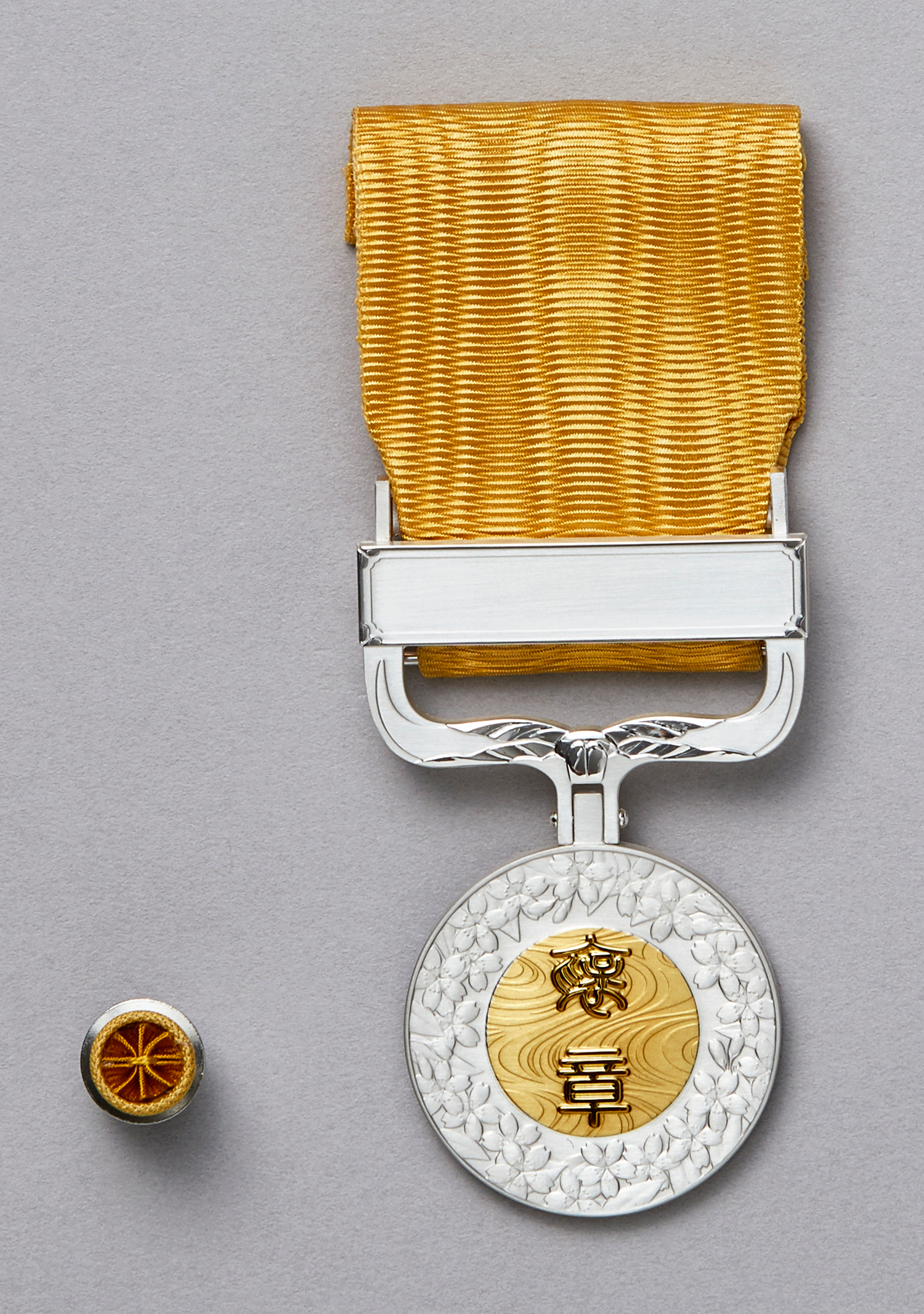
Current design of the Medal of Honor with Yellow Ribbon

First awarded in 1887 (later abolished); revived in 1955. Awarded to individuals who, through their diligence and perseverance while engaging in their professional activities, have become public role models.

=== Purple ribbon ===
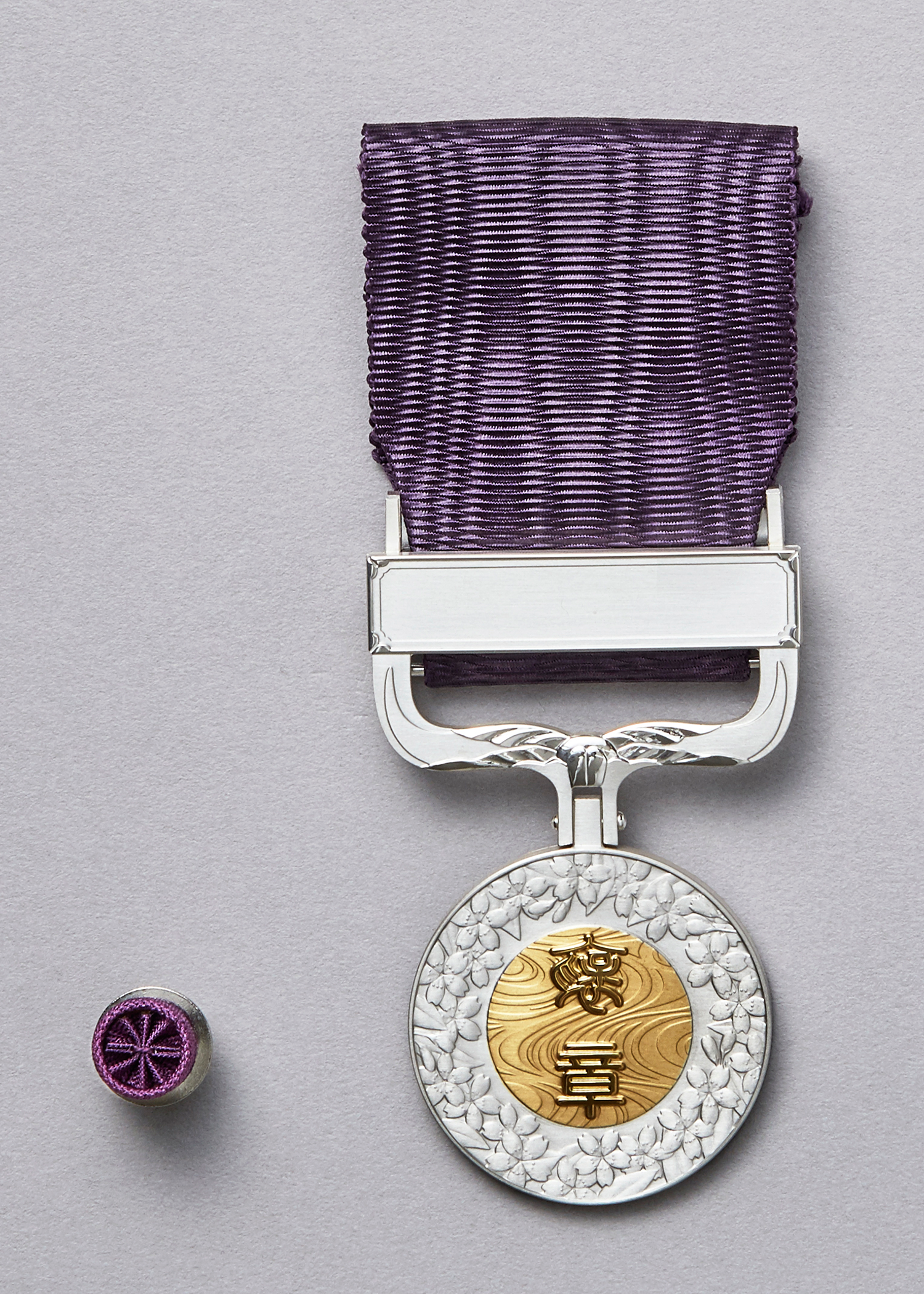
Current design of the Medal of Honor with Purple Ribbon

First awarded in 1955. Awarded to individuals who have contributed to academic and artistic developments, improvements and accomplishments.

=== Blue ribbon ===
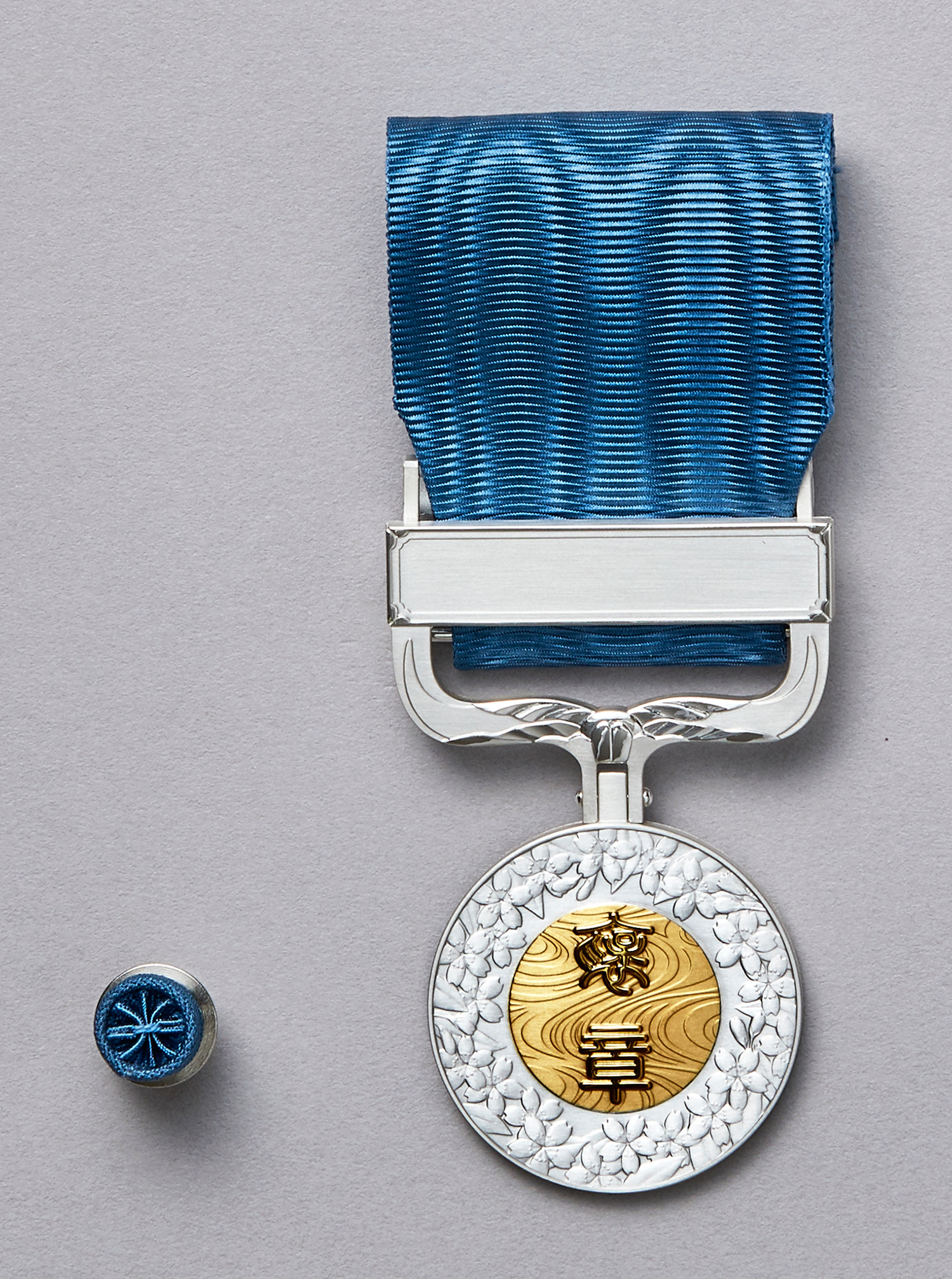
Current design of the Medal of Honor with Blue Ribbon

First awarded in 1882. Awarded to individuals who have made significant achievements in the areas of public welfare or public service.

=== Dark blue ribbon ===
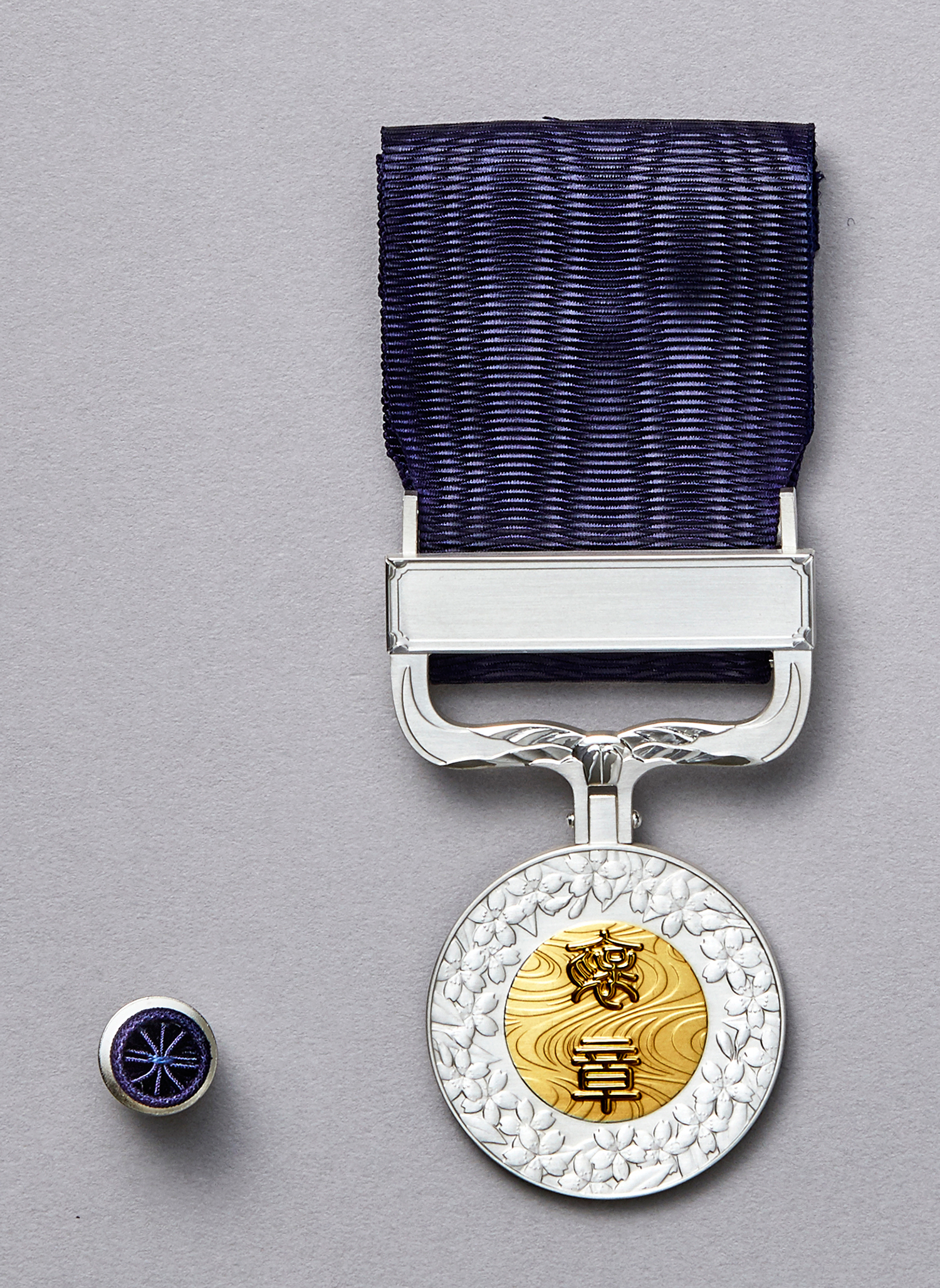
Current design of the Medal of Honor with Dark Blue Ribbon

First awarded in 1919. Awarded to individuals who have made exceptionally generous financial contributions for the well-being of the public.

== Select recipients ==
=== Red ===
- Samuel Robinson, a British-Canadian Royal Naval Reserve officer who participated in relief efforts in the aftermath of the 1923 Great Kantō earthquake
- Yan Jun, a People's Republic of China citizen who saved a Japanese child from drowning during a typhoon in September 2013
- Anuj Raj Karki, a Nepalese citizen who saved a Japanese girl lying unconscious on a railway track.
- Momoko Fukuda, a 20-year-old student at the Okayama University of Science who saved the life of an elderly woman from an oncoming train after she became trapped on a railroad crossing.

=== Green ===
- Ryōtarō Sugi
- Torakusu Yamaha

=== Yellow ===
- Ken Ono
- Hiroshi Maeda
- Noguchi Naohiko
- Hiroshi Tsukakoshi
- Hisashi Suzuki
- Mitsugu Shibata

=== Purple ===
- Osamu Akimoto
- Yasushi Akimoto
- Toshiko Akiyoshi
- Hideaki Anno
- Shizuka Arakawa
- Chieko Asakawa
- Kinji Fukasaku
- Moto Hagio
- Yuzuru Hanyu
- Machiko Hasegawa
- Joe Hisaishi
- Akira Ifukube
- Sayuri Ishikawa
- Chika Kuroda
- Keisuke Kuwata
- Akihiro Maeta
- Takashi Matsumoto
- Miyuki Nakajima
- Eiichi Nakamura
- Koichi Nakano
- Hitoshi Narita
- Tetsuya Noda
- Hideyuki Okano
- Katsuhiro Otomo
- Shoichi Ozawa
- Takao Saito
- Hiroyuki Sanada
- Hiroyuki Sasaki
- Sanpei Satō
- Chiyoko Shimakura
- Takashi Shimura
- Yasuharu Suematsu
- Taihō Kōki
- Rumiko Takahashi
- Keiko Takemiya
- Ichirō Tominaga
- Mitsuo Tsukahara
- Tsuyoshi Tsutsumi
- Morihei Ueshiba
- Hozan Yamamoto
- Yoshihisa Yamamoto
- Koji Yamamura
- Kono Yasui
- Akinori Yonezawa
- Masaaki Yuasa
- Toshiko Yuasa
- Kōji Yakusho
- Katsuya Yokoyama

=== Blue ===
- Toshio Kashio awarded in 1984 for contributions to Japan's post-WWII economic recovery through Kashio Seisakujo (Casio Computer Co.)
- Clara Converse awarded 1929 for contributions to women's education.
- Tano Jōdai awarded for contributions to women's education
- Rokuro Ishikawa
- Koichi Kawai
- Yasuhiro Fukushima
- Yanosuke Hirai, Nuclear engineer whose precaution and foresight prevented two nuclear disasters.
- Masaru Ibuka
- Kaoru Inoue
- Kazuo Imai
- Keiichi Ishizaka
- Norio Ohga
- Eishiro Saito
- Hiroko Sakai
- Nobuchika Sugimura
- Shoichiro Toyoda
- Yoshikazu Yahiro
- Gōgen Yamaguchi
- Alice Appenzeller
- Magokichi Yamaoka
- Carlos Ghosn
- Toshiko Satake (Satake Corporation)
- Abbas Kiarostami
- Hiroyuki Ito (Crypton Future Media)
- Miyazaki Atsuo
- Tomio Fukuoka (1993)
- Tokio Yokoi, Rev ordained minister and politician, international author 1890 to 1920. IHJ 3rd Class Honour award for his contributions during the 1919 Paris Peace Talks
- Tsuyoshi Kikukawa
- Kisshomaru Ueshiba
- Moriteru Ueshiba
- Takeshi "Shin" Okawara

=== Dark blue ===
- Ayumi Hamasaki
- Shingo Katori
- Tak Matsumoto
- Masahiro Nakai
- Takahiro Nishijima
- Yoshiki
