= Hitoshi Narita =

Japanese naval architect

Hitoshi Narita is a Japanese naval architect, researcher and business executive. He was one of the Managing Directors of Mitsui Engineering and Shipbuilding Co. in the 1990s. He is currently senior advisor for science and technology at the US Office of Naval Research's International Field Office, Asia.

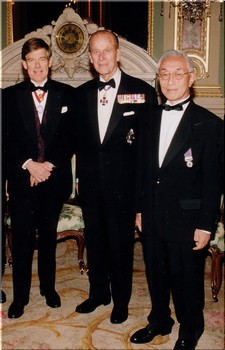
Narita (right) with Prince Philip, Duke of Edinburgh (middle) and Lord Broers (left) attending his election to the Royal Academy of Engineering in 2002

== Early life and education ==
As a child growing up in Nagoya, Japan, he recalls having been fascinated by large mobile structures—airplanes, ships, trains—anything which was large, mechanical, and moved. He believes that his career interests were sparked by having watched the large cargo ships coming in and out of the ports near his home. Narita earned a B.A. in Naval architecture from the University of Tokyo, a M.A. in Naval architecture from the Massachusetts Institute of Technology with Fulbright Scholarship, and a Ph.D. in Engineering from the University of Tokyo.

== Career ==
At Mitsui Engineering and Shipbuilding Co., Narita started out in ship design and went on to work in research and development.

Narita developed the world's first use of the catamaran-like design for large commercial ferries—the "small waterplane area twin hull" or SWATH configuration. The demonstrated stability and seaworthiness of these ferries led to the increased use of a similar vessel design in contexts, including naval ships, oceanographic survey ships, pleasure crafts and sightseeing boats.

Narita led the team developing the novel Mitsui Integrated Duct Propeller (MIDP), which was designed to increase fuel savings in large ships. The MIDP effectively mitigated the constant erosion caused by cavitation from the ship's propeller on the conventional propeller duct by moving the duct forward and by realigning a non-symmetrical duct adapted to the stern flow. The MIDP increased propeller efficiency and virtually eliminated the shipyard downtime, which was formerly necessary for repairing the erosion problems. The substantial fuel savings have been demonstrated in over 200 ships, including all of Exxon's Very Large Crude Carriers. New ships have been incorporated MIDP in their design, and older ships have been retrofitted.

In the 1990s, Narita was given broader responsibility for managing Research and Development, as well as business development at Mitsui Engineering & Shipbuilding. During this period, the Japanese ocean-going shipbuilding industry has evolved into two distinct sectors and today's second-tier or medium-sized firms build close to half the nation's output of large ocean-going vessels. Narita was well-positioned to monitor this diversification in the industry. For a time, Narita was one of the Managing Directors of Mitsui Engineering and Shipbuilding Co. in the 1990s.

In 2002, Narita's contributions to naval architecture—particularly the SWATH configuration and the MIDP assembly—were recognized by his election to Fellowship of the Royal Academy of Engineering, joining an elite group of only 86 other Foreign Members in the Royal Academy. The Royal Academy of Engineering's 2002 "New Fellows' Dinner" took place at the Drapers' Hall, Throgmorton Street in London; and pre-dinner photos commemorating this gala event were organized in the Drapers' formal Drawing Room.

Narita is currently a senior advisor for science and technology at the US Office of Naval Research's International Field Office, Asia. Narita played a significant role in the steps that led to establishing Japan-US joint participation projects, which meant Japan's National Institute of Advanced Industrial Science and Technology (AIST) in 2001. He helped to partner AIST with the US Naval Research Laboratory.

== Honors ==
- International Fellow of the Royal Academy of Engineering (FREng), 2002.

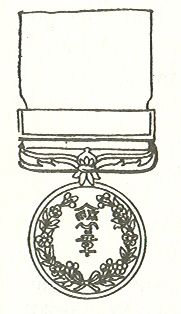
Illustration of details of Japanese National Medal of Honor.

- National Medal of Honor (褒章, hosho), purple ribbon, 1990.
- Medal of the Minister of Transport, 1989.
- Medal of the Kanto District Marine Bureau, 1988.
- Ichimura Prize, 1981.
