= Fairfield Street School =

- U.S. National Register of Historic Places
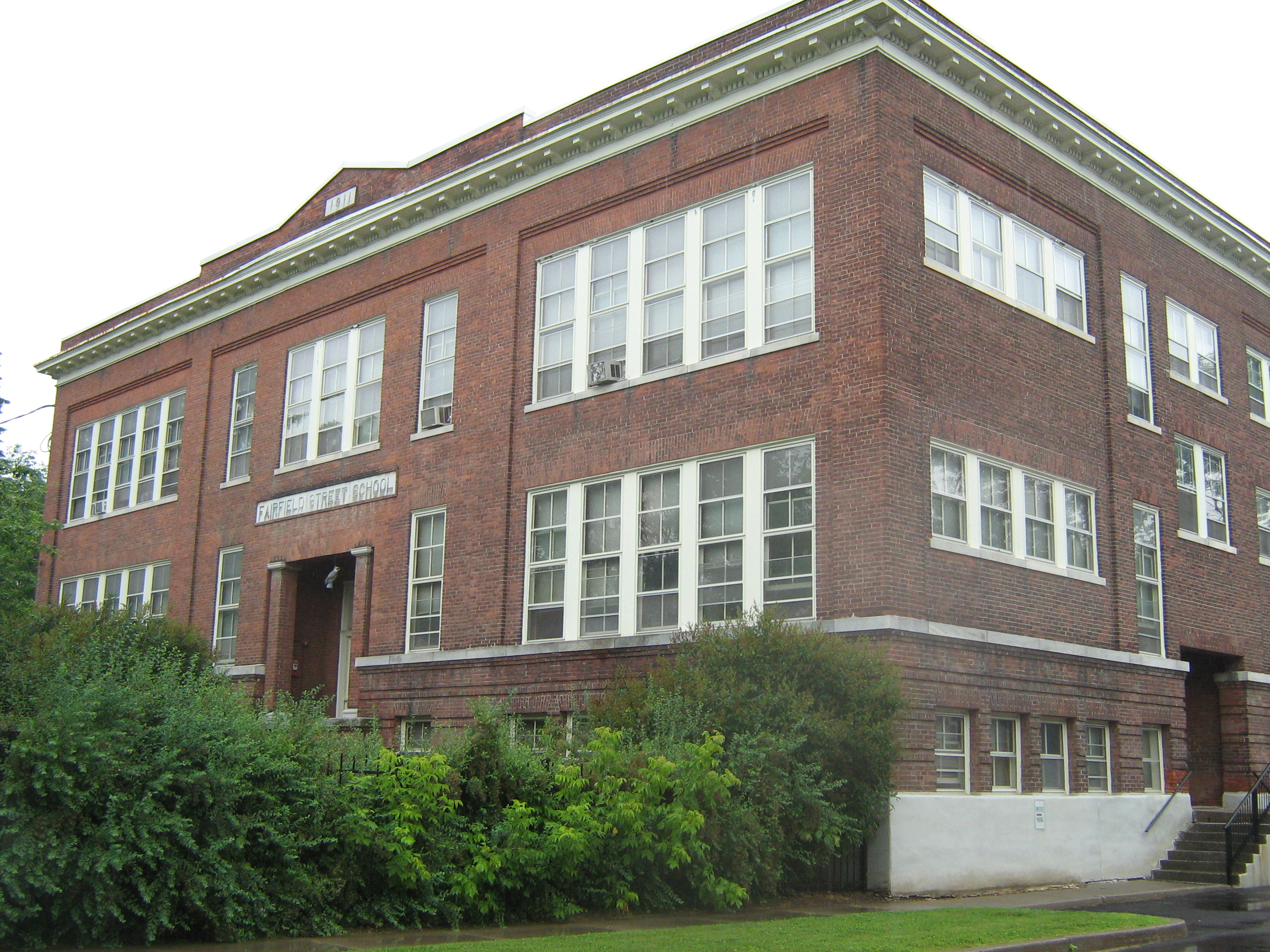

- Location within Vermont Location within the United States
- Location: 78 Fairfield St., St. Albans, Vermont
- Coordinates: 44°48′31″N 73°4′45″W
- Area: less than one acre
- Built: 1911
- Architect: Austin, Frank Lyman
- Architectural style: Colonial Revival
- MPS: Educational Resources of Vermont MPS
- NRHP reference No.: 96001326
- Added to NRHP: November 7, 1996

The Fairfield Street School is a historic school building at 78 Fairfield Street in the city of St. Albans, Vermont. Built in 1911, it served as a school until 1970, and is now converted into residential use. It is a prominent local example of Colonial Revival architecture, designed by Burlington architect Frank Lyman Austin. It was listed on the National Register of Historic Places in 1996.

== Description and history ==
The former Fairfield Street School building stands on the south side of Fairfield Street (Vermont Route 36) on the city's residential east side. It is a large two-story brick building, with flat roof and concrete foundation. It has a raised basement, separated from the main floors by a stone stringcourse. The main facade is divided into three large bays defined by slightly recessed panels. The outer bays have bands of five sash windows on each floor, while the center bay has windows in a 1-3-1 pattern on the second floor, and single windows flanking the recessed entrance on the raised ground floor. The roof line has a modillioned and dentillated cornice, and is topped by a parapet that is gabled at the center.

The city of St. Albans experienced significant growth between 1874 and 1910, resulting in the construction of a number of elementary schools. Crowding continued to be a problem, and this school was built in 1911 to address that issue. It served the city as an elementary school until 1970, when the St. Albans Elementary School opened, consolidating all of the city's elementary school students into a single facility. This building then served as a mental health services outpatient clinic, before its conversion to residential use in the 1990s.

== See also ==
- National Register of Historic Places listings in Franklin County, Vermont
