= Champlain School =

Historic building in Burlington, Vermont, US

- U.S. National Register of Historic Places
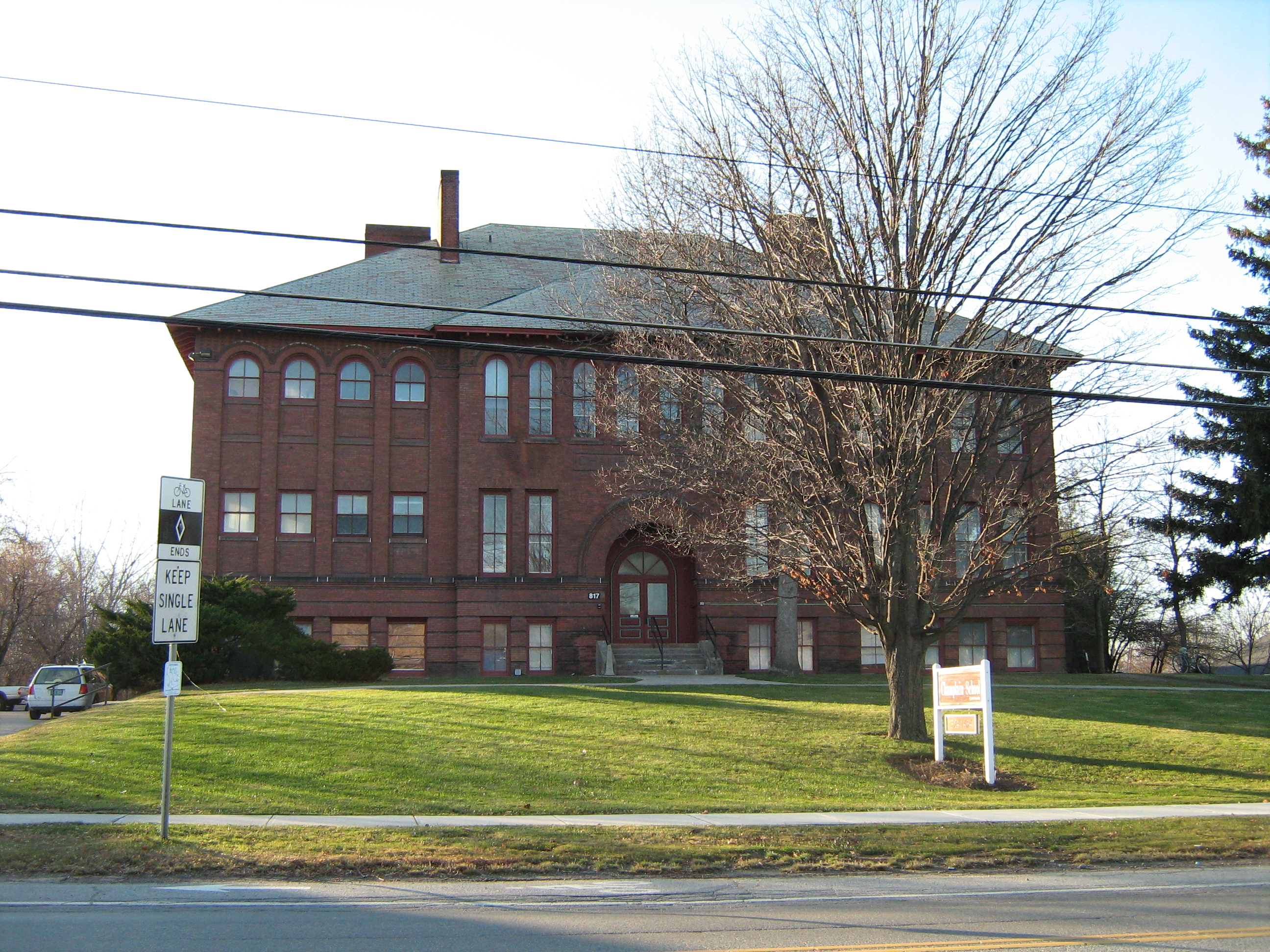

- Location within Vermont
- Location: 809 Pine St., Burlington, Vermont
- Coordinates: 44°27′25″N 73°12′55″W
- Area: 1.8 acres (0.73 ha)
- Built: 1909
- Architect: Austin, Frank Lyman
- Architectural style: Romanesque, Richardsonian Romanesque
- NRHP reference No.: 82001761
- Added to NRHP: December 10, 1982

The Champlain School is a historic former school building at 809 Pine Street in the South End of Burlington, Vermont. Built in 1909, it is a fine local example of vernacular Richardsonian Romanesque architecture, designed by one of the city's most prominent architects of the period. It was used as a school until the end of 1968, and now houses apartments. It was listed on the National Register of Historic Places in 1982.

== Description and history ==
The former Champlain School building is located in Burlington's South End neighborhood, on the west side of Pine Street opposite the Champlain Elementary School. It is two stories in height and is built of red brick with sandstone trim. It is capped by a hip roof, and rests on a raised rubblestone foundation. Its front facade is sixteen bays wide, with the center eight set in a slightly projecting hip-roofed projection. The outer four bays on each side have windows set in tall recessed panels, topped by rounded arches; the upper windows are rounded to fit in those arches. The window bays in the center section are narrower, with the upper windows again topped by rounded arches. On the first floor, the main entrance occupies the center four bays, recessed in a large round-arch opening.

The school was built in 1909, and was the first large-scale commission of Frank Lyman Austin, one of Burlington's leading architects of the early 20th century. It was built to satisfy the then-current ideas about the fireproofing of school buildings, and the need for each classroom to have adequate natural lighting. The neighborhood it served had in the 1890s seen significant growth due to the construction of a textile mill. It served the city through 1968, and has since been converted to apartments, with an addition added onto the rear.

== See also ==
- National Register of Historic Places listings in Chittenden County, Vermont
