= Vermont Academy =

Prep school in Saxtons River, Vermont, US

- Logo of Vermont Academy.

Location
- 10 Long Walk; Saxtons River, Vermont 05154; United States; 43.1417444°N 72.5087004°W

Information
- Type: Private boarding and day school
- Established: 1876
- Head of School: Mike Peller
- Faculty: 60
- Enrollment: 222
- Campus: Rural
- Colors: Black and orange
- Mascot: Wildcats
- Website: www.vermontacademy.org
- Vermont Academy Campus Historic District
- U.S. National Register of Historic Places
- U.S. Historic district
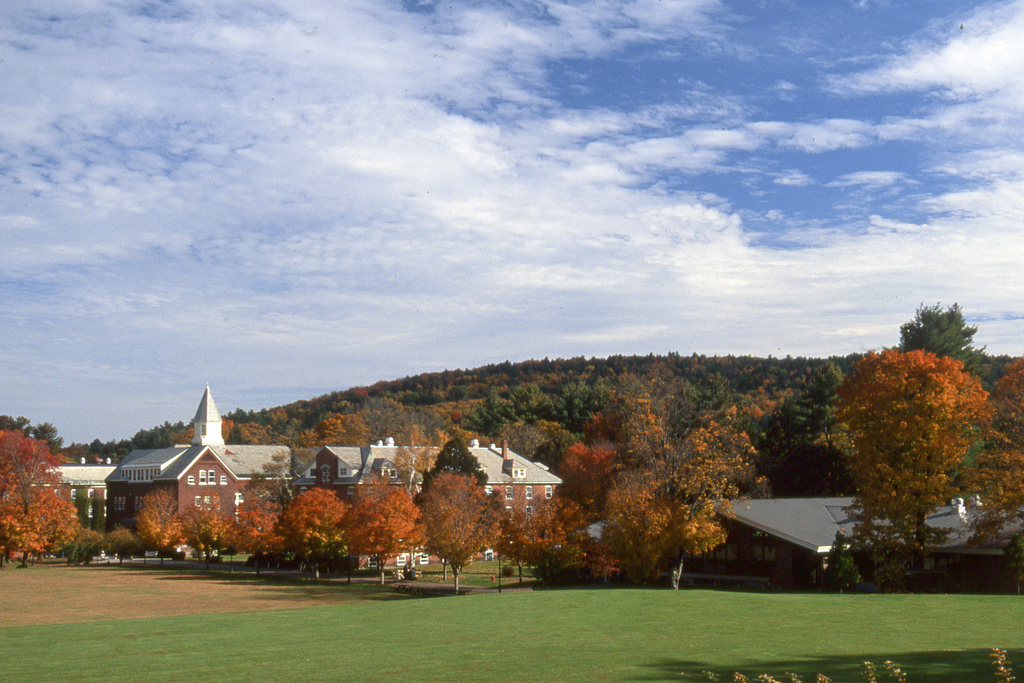
- View of the Vermont Academy campus in 2013.
- Architect: Adden & Parker; Adden, Parker, Clinch & Crimp; Frank Lyman Austin; Clinton Smith
- Architectural style: Italianate, Romanesque Revival
- NRHP reference No.: 15000423
- Added to NRHP: July 14, 2015

Vermont Academy (VA) is a private, co-educational, college preparatory, boarding and day school in Saxtons River, Vermont, serving students from ninth through twelfth grade, as well as postgraduates. Founded in 1876, the campus was listed on the National Register of Historic Places as the Vermont Academy Campus Historic District in 2015.

== History ==
The resolution to establish Vermont Academy was made at the annual meeting of the Vermont Baptist State convention in Windsor, Vermont on November 10, 1869. The school was to educate youth of both sexes from the Baptist community.

The largest subscription (of $20,000) came from a native of Saxtons River, Charles L. Jones, who was at that time living in Cambridge, MA. The first campus building was named after him: Jones Hall still stands today.

Founded in 1876 by William M. Pingry, Vermont Academy originally included a boys-only lower school, which gave "...special attention to life in the open."

In 1934 Laurence G. Leavitt became headmaster and served as such for twenty-five years. Enrollment doubled and school debt was eliminated.

== Traditions ==
=== The Vermont Academy Evening Song ===
O Vermont, we've seen your beauty,
changing with each hour and day.
We have found your hidden trout pools,
where the light and shadows play.

Swirling sparks above a campfire,
hemlocks laden down with snow.
Autumn hillsides flaming crimson,
where the sugar maples grow.

Morning mist upon the mountains,
frosty stars across the sky.
Snowy campus turned to silver,
when the moon is riding high.

O Vermont, we will not leave you,
here behind us when we part.
We will take your beauty with us,
etched forever on each heart!

— Dorothy Hall Leavitt, The Vermont Academy Evening Song (1934)

What is Vermont Academy? It is fundamentally and inseparably a part of Vermont — Vermont hills and valleys; it is Mountain Day with the trees a riot of color and the steaks sizzling over the coals; it is ski tracks making patterns on smooth hillsides; it is the lovely blue pyramid of Mount Ascutney rising over the foothills; it is spring nights at the cabin and the first swimming at Bowles pond.

— Dorothy Hall Leavitt, Vermont Life Volume 1

== Academics ==
The Vermont Academy curriculum includes courses in Art, College Counseling, English, History, Learning Skills, Mathematics, Music, Science, and World Language (French, Latin, or Spanish). Additionally, VA is a partner with Liceo Europeo, a private school in Madrid.

== Athletics ==
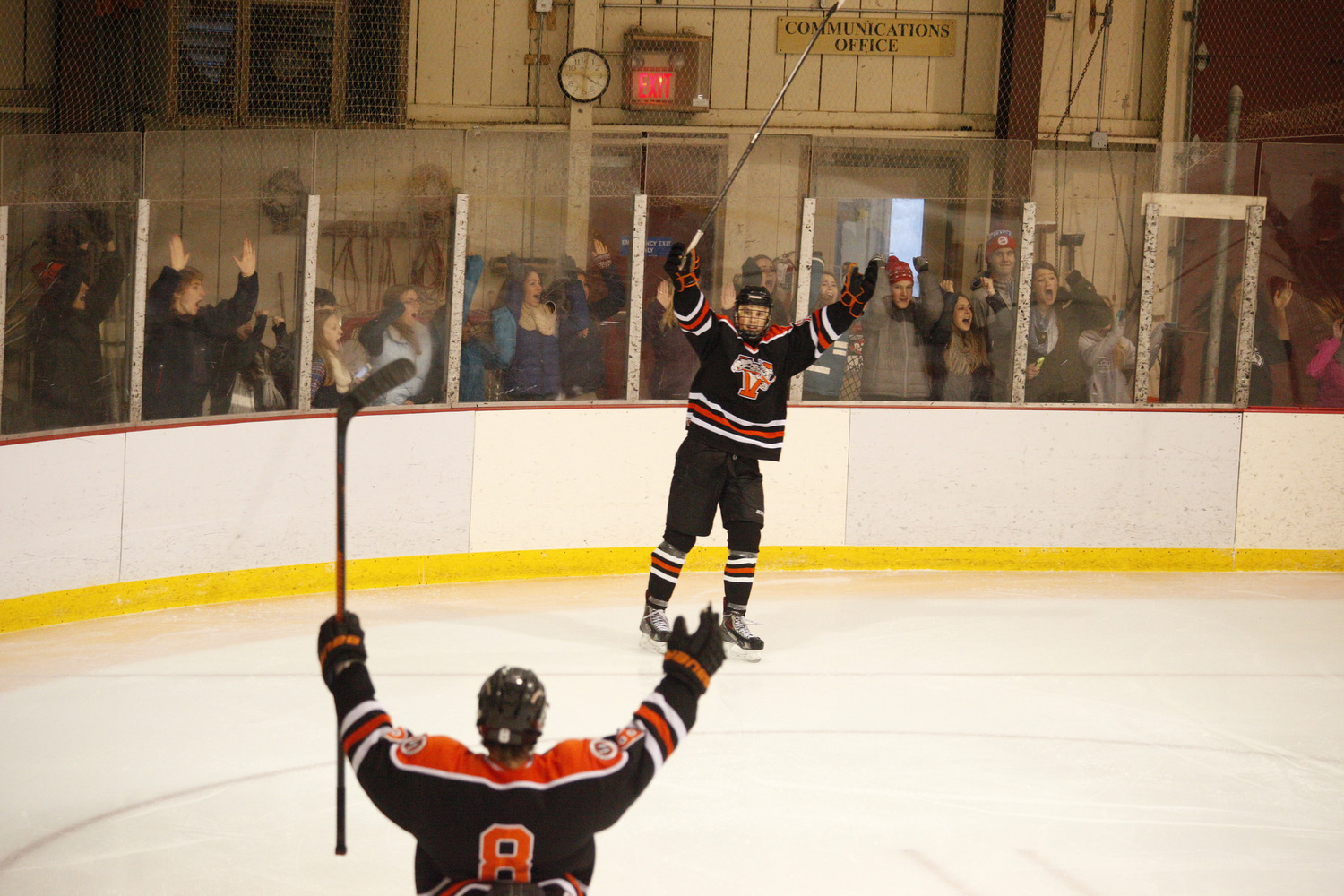
Two Vermont Academy Boys Varsity Ice Hockey players (Justin Cole and Cam Wright) celebrate scoring a goal in Michael Choukas Skating Rink

Home of the Wildcats, Vermont Academy athletics compete in the New England Preparatory School Athletic Council and are a member of the Lakes Region League. The school offers a wide range of sports, categorized by Fall, Spring, and Winter. Fall athletics include: crew, cross country, equestrian, mountain biking, soccer, and wilderness skills. Spring athletics include: baseball, equestrian, fly fishing, golf, lacrosse, rock climbing, and tennis. Winter athletics include: alpine, basketball, dance, freeski, hockey, nordic, skiing, and snowboarding.

The school has five playing fields and two practice ones, an ice rink, six tennis courts, a thirteen-station ropes course, a mountain biking course, 20 kilometres (12 mi) of trails, and a winter sports park, including ski jumps and slopes.

== Campus ==
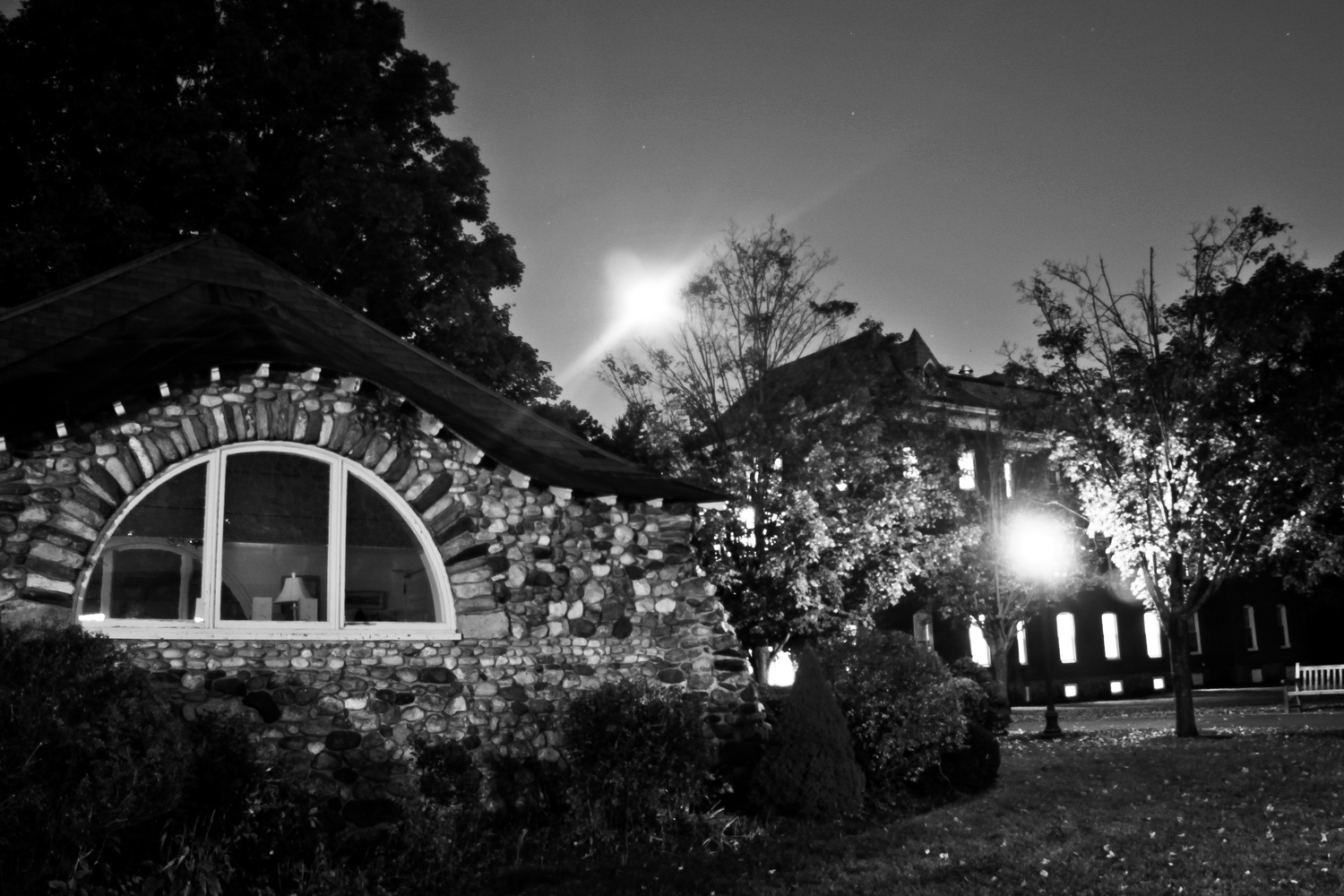
A view of Jones Hall Dormitory and the Business Office (formerly the Admissions Office)

The Vermont Academy campus is located on the north side of Saxtons River, bounded on the south by Burk Hill Road and on the east by Pleasant Street. It is more than 450 acres (180 ha) in size, and includes buildings dating back to the school's founding in 1876. Jones Hall, now a dormitory, was its only building until 1888, when Fuller Hall, named for trustee Levi K. Fuller was built. In 1921, Alumni Hall was designed by the noted architect Frank Lyman Austin. In addition to the Wilbur Library, Vermont Academy has a number of buildings on campus. Dormitories are separated by gender, with space to accommodate just over 100 boys and 60 girls. In the 2000s, several new spaces on campus were created, including: the observatory (2003), the gymnasium and fitness center (2004), and a performing arts center (2006).

The Vermont Academy campus was listed on the National Register of Historic Places in 2015.

== Tuition ==
Tuition for the 2023-2024 academic year is $69,500 for boarding students, and $38,000 for day students.

== Notable alumni ==
Vermont Academy has educated numerous American politicians and military officers, including the diplomat John Barrett (1885), the ambassador Mark Palmer (1959), the judges Joseph Bogdanski (1931), Fred Tarbell Field (1895), and Frank L. Fish, and three members of the House of Representatives: Henry L. Bowles, Howard A. Coffin, and Samuel B. Pettengill (1904). Frank C. Archibald, the seventh Vermont Attorney General, also graduated from the school. Frank E. Putnam, who was a lawyer and served in the Minnesota Senate, graduated from the Vermont Academy. Military officers include United States Army officers Donald E. Edwards (1955) and Bruce M. Lawlor (1966), Marine Corps officer William W. Stickney (1922), and Navy officer Joseph Metcalf III (1946).

A number of graduates have also pursued professional sports. Professional basketball players include: Bruce Brown (2016), Keron DeShields (2011), Corey Johnson (2015), Tyrique Jones (2016), Jordan Nwora (2017), Simisola Shittu (2018), and Christian Vital, who later transferred to St. Thomas More School. Brown and Nwora are the only two to have played in the National Basketball Association, with Nwora winning the 2021 NBA Finals with the Milwaukee Bucks and Brown accomplishing the feat in 2023 with the Denver Nuggets. Professional hockey players include Chloé Aurard (2018), Paul Fenton (1978), Lotti Odnoga (2018) and Blanka Škodová (2018), while Bill Torrey (1952) is a member of the Hockey Hall of Fame as an executive in the National Hockey League, as a General Manager of the New York Islanders in the 80s, winning four Stanley Cups in a row. Other notable athletes include Bert Abbey (1887) and Danny MacFayden of Major League Baseball, the skiers Rob DesLauriers (1983) and Joseph Peter Wilson, the football player Marcus Santos-Silva (2017), and Jim MacLaren (1981), a triathlete. John Henry Williams (1986), the only son of the baseball great Ted Williams, also attended the school.

Three notable founders and inventors attended Vermont Academy in the nineteenth century, including: Paul Harris (1888), the founder of Rotary International; Russell W. Porter (1891), the founder of amateur telescope making; and Archibald Query (1900), the inventor of Marshmallow Fluff. Christopher A. Sinclair (1967), the former chief executive officer of Pepsi, also graduated from the school.

The authors George Burwell Utley, Mark W. Smith (1987), John Steptoe, and Helen M. Winslow, the orthodontist Albert H. Ketcham, the scientist Florence R. Sabin (1889), and the religious figures Bishop John Bryson Chane (1963) and missionary Clara Converse (1879), who is credited with establishing education for women in Japan, all graduated from the school.

Joe Perry (1969), the lead guitarist of the noted rock band Aerosmith, graduated from Vermont Academy.

== Controversies ==
In 2014, Brant Nelson, a math and science teacher at Vermont Academy, was charged with possession and production of child pornography, as well as interstate travel to engage in sexual acts with a minor, and interstate transportation of a minor for sexual activity. Vermont Academy fired Nelson in 2012 after receiving reports of CSAM on his computer. He was later sentenced to 30 years in prison.

== See also ==
- National Register of Historic Places listings in Windham County, Vermont
