= Clara Converse =

American educator and missionary

- Photograph of Converse from 1929.
- Born: Clara Adra Converse; May 8, 1857; Grafton, Windham County, Vermont
- Died: January 24, 1935 (aged 77); Yokohama, Japan
- Other names: Clara A. Converse, クララ・カンヴァース
- Occupation: Educator
- Years active: 1873-1925
- Known for: establishing women's education in Japan

Clara Adra Converse (May 8, 1857 – January 24, 1935) was an American educator and missionary who joined the Woman’s Baptist Foreign Missionary Society and became a pioneer educator in Japan. After earning her credentials at the Vermont Academy and Smith College, Converse moved to Yokohama where she was influential in establishing girls' education. In addition to directing the Soshin Jo-Gakko (Truth Seeking Girls' School) for thirty-five years, she established several kindergartens. Her work to improve education for women in Japan was recognized by the Medal of Honor with Blue Ribbon in 1929.

== Early life ==
Clara Adra Converse was born on 8 May 1857 in Grafton, Windham County, Vermont to Mary (née Stuart/Stewart) and Newton R. Converse. She was one of nine children and grew up on her parents farm in Grafton, where her father had been born. Her paternal grandparents, Robert and Edna (née Hale) Converse had immigrated from Marlborough, New Hampshire to Vermont before the birth of their children. Her maternal grandfather Joseph Stuart was a miller and farmer from Andover, Vermont. After completing her elementary education, Converse graduated from the Vermont State Normal School at the age of sixteen.

== Career ==
Converse began working as a teacher in the public schools and in 1877, when the Vermont Academy opened, she enrolled in the preparatory courses, graduating in 1879, as one of the two women enrolled in her class. Continuing her studies Converse attended Smith College, graduating in the class of 1883. Her mother died the following year. Converse returned to Vermont Academy, after completion of her education and between 1884 and 1889, she taught German, Greek, mathematics and rhetoric. One of her students was Florence Sabin. In 1885, she became the superintendent of schools in Grafton simultaneously with her teaching. When her father died in 1888, Converse felt led to become a missionary.

Around this same time, the Woman's Baptist Foreign Missionary Society had published a plea for volunteers to go abroad. Converse applied to the society in Boston in May, 1889 and was appointed to teach in Yokohama, Japan at the Mary L. Colby Home. She gave her notice to the Vermont Academy and made her way to San Francisco. Arriving in Japan in January, 1890, she began working and by that autumn, was placed in charge of the school. She was the second principal in the school's history, following the founder Charlotte Brown, wife of Nathan Brown. In 1891, a new school building was erected in Yamate and the following year, the name was changed to Soshin Jo-Gakko (ja), (Truth-Seeking Girls School), to reflect that the girls' education was to be based on a search for Christian ideals.

In 1897, Converse received her first furlough and returned to the United States, where she undertook several talks about her work abroad. She returned to Japan and worked to spread the cause of girls' education founding Bible study, Sunday schools and a kindergarten. In 1899, when the Meiji government implemented reforms to the educational system in Japan, Converse secured licensing for the school from the government for the school's operation. She took a second vacation in 1907 and remained in the United States for a year, once again traveling and making presentations to increase support for her work abroad. During that time, a new site and expansion for the school was planned.

When she returned, Converse set out to revise the school curriculum, taking the elementary school to six-year program and the girls' high school to a five-year plan with the last three dedicated to their field of expertise. The school continued to change and expand. In 1918, when Tokyo University allowed women to enter, Converse was appointed as a director of studies for women. She terminated the English courses at Soshin since girls could study them in the university, but within the year, she brought them back. Beginning in 1921, she asked for a replacement as principal and began preparing for her retirement, though it would take four years for a new principal, Annabel Pawley to be hired, and for Converse to tender her resignation. Though she retired from the school, Converse continued her missionary works and remained as an emeritus principal, helping with the school. Between 1925 and 1935, she established four kindergartens and assisted with their development. In 1929, Emperor Showa Hirohito conferred on Converse the Medal of Honor with Blue Ribbon, in recognition of her contributions to women's education and the Japanese nation.

== Death and legacy ==
Converse died on January 24, 1935 in Yokohama and was buried in the Mitsuzawa Cemetery. In 1959, the son of Converse's first Japanese graduate came to the United States to pay tribute to the teacher's memory. He had become an educator largely because of Converse's influence on his mother. The school she worked to build was still thriving at that time.
