= Swanton School =

- U.S. National Register of Historic Places
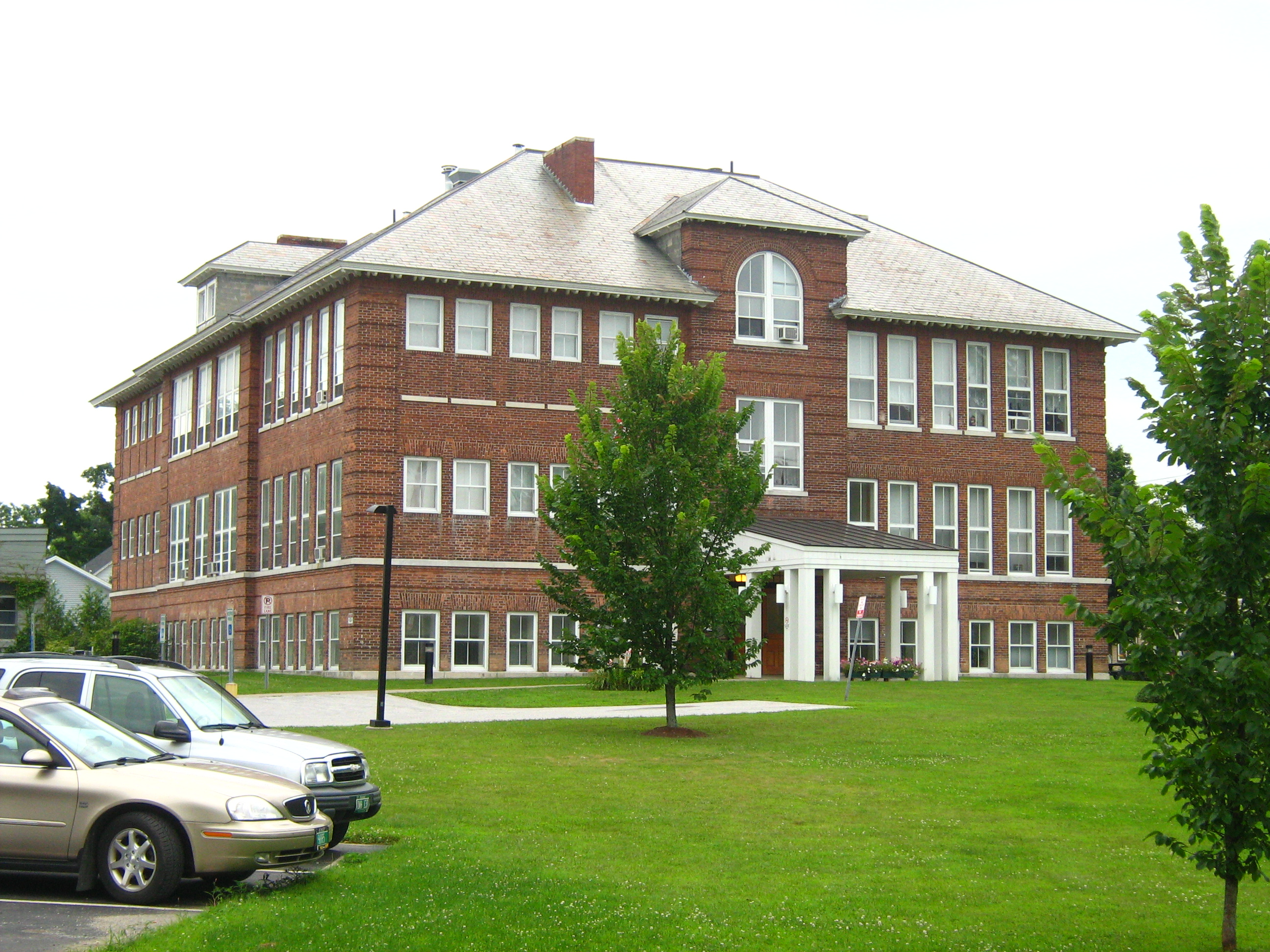

- Location within Vermont Location within the United States
- Location: 53 Church St., Swanton, Vermont
- Coordinates: 44°54′58″N 73°7′26″W
- Area: 1.2 acres (0.49 ha)
- Built: 1912
- Architect: Frank Lyman Austin
- Architectural style: Colonial Revival
- MPS: Educational Resources of Vermont MPS
- NRHP reference No.: 02000118
- Added to NRHP: March 1, 2002

The Swanton School is a historic school building at 53 Church Street in the village of Swanton, Vermont. Built in 1912, it served first as a primary school and then a high school, until its closure in 1993. A high quality example of Colonial Revival architecture, it has been converted into senior housing. It was listed on the National Register of Historic Places in 2002.

== Description and history ==
The former Swanton School stands in the village of Swanton, south of the village green and the cluster of municipal and religious buildings at its southern end. It faces west toward Church Street and Lake Champlain on 1.2 acres (0.49 ha) of level landscaped terrain. It is a large three-story brick building with a hip roof. There are wide brick quoins at the building corners, and at the corners of projecting sections at the centers of its main facades. The ground floor functions as an elevated basement, and is separated from the upper floors by a marble beltcourse. Windows are set in rectangular openings with marble sills and brick headers. Windows on the left side of each facade are shortened, with the lower section of the bay filled with brick between the bottom of the window and the sill. The main entrance is sheltered by a projecting shed-roof porch supported by clusters of square posts.

The school was built in 1912 to a design by Frank Lyman Austin of Burlington. The school was built to house all twelve grades, the state having formally required towns to provide secondary school education in 1906. An elementary school was built by the town in 1963 to relieve crowding at this school, which continued to educate the higher grade levels in 1970. At that time, a regional high school was opened, and this was converted to a primary school. It closed its doors in 1993, and in 1999 conversion to senior housing and a community center was begun.

== See also ==
- National Register of Historic Places listings in Franklin County, Vermont
