= Springfield Downtown Historic District =

Historic district in Vermont, United States

- U.S. National Register of Historic Places
- U.S. Historic district
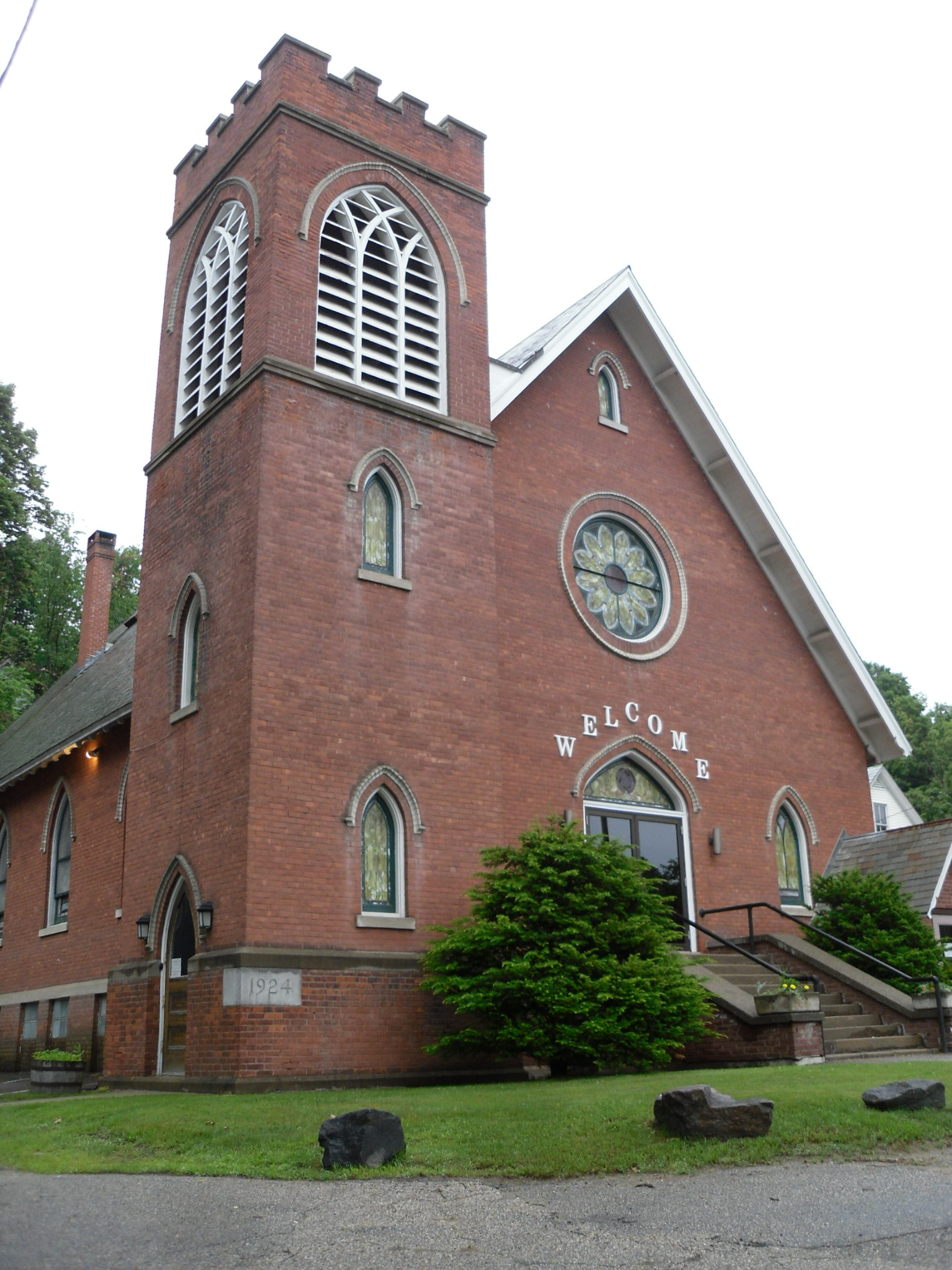

- Location within Vermont Location within the United States
- Location: Roughly bounded by Black River, Mineral, Pearl, Main, and Valley Sts., Springfield, Vermont
- Coordinates: 43°18′4″N 72°29′5″W
- Area: 45 acres (18 ha)
- Built: 1869
- Architect: Tinker, C; Austin, F.; Adden, W.; Porter, R.
- Architectural style: Italianate, Queen Anne, Gothis Revival
- NRHP reference No.: 83003234 (original); 86001995 (increase)

Significant dates
- Added to NRHP: August 11, 1983
- Boundary increase: September 11, 1986

The Springfield Downtown Historic District encompasses the historic central business district of the town of Springfield, Vermont. Located in a narrow valley on the banks of the Black River, the town's architecture is primarily reflective of its importance as a manufacturing center in the late 19th and early-to-mid 20th centuries, with a cluster of commercial buildings surrounded by residential and industrial areas. It was listed on the National Register of Historic Places in 1983, and enlarged slightly in 1986.

== Description and history ==
The town of Springfield was first settled by colonists in the 1750s, but significant settlement did not take place until the construction of the Crown Point Road and the end of the French and Indian War in 1762. Its first sawmill was built on the falls of the Black River, near the present downtown. The first bridge spanning the river was built in the 1770s, and the town center grew around that and a growing number of mills. In the late 19th century, the town became a center for the manufacture of precision machine tools. The town suffered repeated disasters by flood and fire, all of which shaped the development of the town center.

The historic district extends primarily along Main Street (Vermont Route 106), north from its crossing of the Black River to Elm Hill Street, and several industrial buildings on the west side of the river, notably including a large industrial complex on Pearl Street. It was expanded in 1986 to include the two bridges crossing the river, as well as the dams that provided water power to the town's industries. The commercial and civic heart is at the junction of Main and Park Streets, the latter providing one of the village's river crossings. Commercial buildings are typically one to three stories in height, built of either brick or wood, and there are churches and other civic buildings clustered around Central Square, just north of the junction. The area just across the river is industrial, while residences are mainly found just east of the downtown area

== See also ==
- National Register of Historic Places listings in Windsor County, Vermont
