= Gordon House =

Gordon House may refer to:

- Gordon House (Amherstburg), designated building in Ontario, Canada
- Gordon House, Chelsea, Grade II listed house in West London
- Gordon House (Irene, South Dakota)
- Gordon House (Jamaica), seat of Parliament
- Gordon House (Silverton, Oregon), designed by Frank Lloyd Wright

== See also ==
- Troy Gordon House, Fayetteville, Arkansas, listed on the National Register of Historic Places (NRHP)
- Leonard Gordon Homestead, Hexagonal Grain Crib, Twentythree, Arkansas
- J. M. Gordon House, Odessa, Delaware
- Gordon-Banks House, Newnan, Georgia, listed on the NRHP in Coweta County
- Gordon-Lee House, Chickamauga, Georgia
- David R. Gordon House, Abilene, Kansas, listed on the NRHP in Dickinson County
- Cornelia Gordon House, Louisville, Kentucky, listed on the NRHP in Jefferson County
- David Gordon House and Collins Log Cabin, Columbia, Missouri
- Lester S. and Missouri "Zue" Gordon Parker House, Jefferson City, Missouri
- Gordon House (Hamilton, Montana), listed on the NRHP in Ravalli County
- William E. Gordon House, Bellevue, Nebraska
- York-Gordon House, New Bern, North Carolina
- George W. Gordon Farm, Franklin, Pennsylvania
- John Gordon House, Williamsport, Tennessee
- Gordon-Center House, Grand Isle, Vermont
- Nealy Gordon Farm, Brush Harbor, Virginia
- Gordon-Baughan-Warren House, Richmond, Virginia
