= State Route 314 (New York–Vermont) =

Two US highways, connected by a ferry

Route 314
- Map of Grand Isle County in northwestern Vermont and Clinton County in northeastern New York– NY 314 and VT 314 highlighted in solid red, former alignments of NY 314 in blue

Route information
- Maintained by NYSDOT (NY 314) and VTrans (VT 314)
- Length: 6.25 mi (10.06 km): NY 314: 0.76 mi; VT 314: 5.493 mi
- History: NY 314 assigned c. 1962; VT 314 assigned May 1, 1964 originally designated VT F-3 in late 1920s

Major junctions
- West end: I-87 in Plattsburgh, New York
- US 9 in Plattsburgh, New York
- East end: US 2 in Grand Isle, Vermont

Location
- Country: United States
- State: New York
- Counties: Clinton County, New York; Grand Isle County, Vermont

Highway system
- New York Highways; Interstate; US; State; Reference; Parkways
- State highways in Vermont
← NY 313	New York	→ NY 315
← VT 313	Vermont	→ VT 315
← VT F-2		→ VT F-4

New York State Route 314 (NY 314) and Vermont Route 314 (VT 314) are a pair of like-numbered state highways in New York and Vermont in the United States, that are connected by way of the Grand Isle–Plattsburgh Ferry across Lake Champlain and the Thomas MacDonough Highway in Plattsburgh. NY 314 extends for 0.76 miles (1.22 km) through the Clinton County town of Plattsburgh from Interstate 87 (I-87) exit 39 to U.S. Route 9. NY 314 previously continued another 3.95 miles (6.36 km) to the ferry landing on Cumberland Head. Its Vermont counterpart is a 5.493-mile (8.840 km) loop route off of U.S. Route 2 (US 2) through the Grand Isle County towns of South Hero and Grand Isle that connects to the ferry near its midpoint.

VT 314 was originally designated as Vermont Route F-3 in the late 1920s. The roadway on the New York side was unnumbered until c. 1962, when Cumberland Head Road was designated as NY 314. VT F-3 was redesignated as VT 314 in 1964 to match the designation present at the New York ferry approach. In 2005, a new highway connecting US 9 to the ferry landing by way of the interior of Cumberland Head was completed and opened to traffic as the Commodore Thomas MacDonough Highway. NY 314 was realigned to follow the new highway while ownership and maintenance of its old alignment was transferred to the town of Plattsburgh. The designation of NY 314 east of US 9 was removed by July 2014.

== Route description ==
=== NY 314 ===
NY 314 begins along Moffitt Road in the town of Plattsburgh. The route heads southeast as a four-lane divided highway still known as Moffitt Road. Almost immediately, the state route reaches Adirondack Northway's (I-87) exit 39, a half-cloverleaf interchange and half-diamond interchange. Just past the interchange, the road reaches an intersection with US 9 (the Lakes to Locks Passage), where NY 314 terminates. The total length of the state highway is 0.76 miles (1.22 km).

=== VT 314 ===
VT 314 begins at an intersection with US 2 just north of Keeler Bay, a village in the town of South Hero. The route heads northwestward as Ferry Road, passing by a small number of homes situated amongst open fields. At the western edge of Grand Isle, VT 314 intersects West Shore Road, a local highway that runs along the western shoreline of the island. The route turns north onto West Shore Road, following the roadway along Lake Champlain and into the town of Grand Isle. Here, the route's surroundings are mainly the same as it proceeds toward Gordon Landing.

In Gordon Landing, VT 314 connects to a ferry landing for the Grand Isle–Plattsburgh Ferry (which leads to Clinton CR 57) by way of an unnamed extension of Bell Hill Road. VT 314 continues northward along West Shore Road to Allen Road, where the route turns to follow Allen Road eastward across the island. While on Allen Road, the route passes through an area of open fields and forests that contains only a couple dozen homes. VT 314 continues eastward to another junction with US 2, where the route comes to an end.

== History ==
=== Designations ===
Vermont Route F-3
- Location: Gordon Landing–South Hero
- Existed: c. 1927–1964

All of modern VT 314 was originally designated as VT F-3 in the late 1920s. At Gordon Landing, VT F-3 connected to Cumberland Head in New York by way of the Grand Isle–Plattsburgh Ferry across Lake Champlain. The primary highway leading from the New York ferry landing to US 9 near Plattsburgh, then Cumberland Head Road, was initially unnumbered. VT F-3 was maintained by the towns of South Hero and Grand Isle until June 20, 1957, when the state of Vermont assumed ownership and maintenance of the highway.

The portion of the Adirondack Northway (I-87) between exits 36 and 39 was completed and opened to traffic c. 1961. Moffitt Road was upgraded between the new freeway and US 9 as part of the Northway's construction. By the following year, the upgraded piece of Moffitt Road and the piece of Cumberland Head Road between US 9 and the ferry landing was designated as NY 314. From I-87 to US 9, NY 314 was maintained by the New York State Department of Transportation; the remainder of the route was maintained by Clinton County and co-designated as CR 42. VT F-3 was renumbered to VT 314 on May 1, 1964, to match the designation now present at the New York ferry approach.

=== Cumberland Head connector ===
The idea of a building a new highway that would lead directly from US 9 to the ferry landing at the southern tip of Cumberland Head was first proposed in 1964. At that time, a group of Cumberland Head residents stated that the existing narrow and winding perimeter road (NY 314) jeopardized the safety of residents and motorists alike. As time went on, the problem grew worse as the amount of traffic traveling to and from the ferry increased. The proposal finally gained traction in 2002 when New York State Senator Ronald B. Stafford was able to procure most of the $7.3 million required to build the highway. Construction on the new route began in March 2005 following three years of studies and planning.

The Cumberland Head connector began at the east end of the divided highway portion of NY 314 and would pass through the rural interior of the peninsula on its way to the ferry landing. Part of the road would utilize the preexisting Lighthouse Road. It was built as a super two highway with a 45-mile-per-hour (72 km/h) speed limit, 10 miles per hour (16 km/h) higher than that of the perimeter road. The project was initially expected to be completed around November 2006; however, it was completed nearly a year ahead of schedule. On December 1, 2005, the new highway was named the Commodore Thomas MacDonough Highway in honor of Thomas MacDonough, an American naval officer who defeated the British in the Battle of Plattsburgh during the War of 1812. The road opened to traffic about a week later, co-designated as NY 314 (which was realigned to follow the length of the highway) and CR 57. Following the completion of the project, ownership and maintenance of Cumberland Head Road (NY 314's former routing) was to be transferred from Clinton County to the town of Plattsburgh. The transfer was officially approved on September 13, 2006.

The new highway has only two intersections, both with Cumberland Head Road. This was by design as no access roads were built off of the route in an effort to improve safety along the highway. One part of the finished highway that drew controversy was a one-way ramp built between the eastbound MacDonough Highway and the west end of Cumberland Head Road. Some residents criticized the layout, stating that it made it difficult to travel to and from MacDonough Highway and Cumberland Head Road. Ironically, the ramp was added as a result of public input; the initial project designs did not call for a ramp. Instead, all traffic to and from Cumberland Head Road would have had to utilize the junction with MacDonough Highway 0.25 miles (0.40 km) to the east. The designation of NY 314 east of US 9 was removed by July 2014.

== Major intersections ==
NY 314

The entire route is in Plattsburgh, Clinton County.

mi	km	Destinations	Notes
0.00	0.00	Moffitt Road	
0.00– 0.67	0.00– 1.08	I-87 to A-15 – Montreal, Albany	Exit 39 (I-87), to Plattsburgh International Airport
0.78	1.26	US 9 (Lakes to Locks Passage) – Plattsburgh, Chazy	
0.78	1.26	CR 57 (Commodore Thomas MacDonough Highway) to Grand Isle–Plattsburgh Ferry	To VT 314
1.000 mi = 1.609 km; 1.000 km = 0.621 mi

VT 314

The entire route is in Grand Isle County.

Location	mi	km	Destinations	Notes
South Hero	0.000	0.000	US 2 – Grand Isle, Alburgh, South Hero, Burlington	
Grand Isle	2.243	3.610	Grand Isle–Plattsburgh Ferry	To Clinton CR 57
Grand Isle	5.493	8.840	US 2 – South Hero, Alburgh	
1.000 mi = 1.609 km; 1.000 km = 0.621 mi

== See also ==
- List of county routes in Clinton County, New York
- State Route 74 (New York–Vermont)
- State Route 346 (New York–Vermont)
