= National Register of Historic Places listings in Grand Isle County, Vermont =

Location of Grand Isle County in Vermont

This is a list of the National Register of Historic Places listings in Grand Isle County, Vermont.

This is intended to be a complete list of the properties and districts on the National Register of Historic Places in Grand Isle County, Vermont, United States. Latitude and longitude coordinates are provided for many National Register properties and districts; these locations may be seen together in a map.

There are 12 properties listed on the National Register in the county.

This National Park Service list is complete through NPS recent listings posted June 19, 2026.

Contents: Counties in Vermont
Addison - Bennington - Caledonia - Chittenden - Essex - Franklin - Grand Isle - Lamoille - Orange - Orleans - Rutland - Washington - Windham - Windsor

== Current listings ==
	Name on the Register	Image	Date listed	Location	City or town	Description
1	Congregational Church-Grand Isle	Congregational Church-Grand Isle	March 2, 2001 (#01000224)	12 Hyde Rd. 44°43′21″N 73°17′46″W	Grand Isle	
2	Gordon-Center House	Gordon-Center House	April 17, 1986 (#86000808)	54 West Shore Rd. 44°41′19″N 73°20′50″W	Grand Isle	
3	Grand Isle County Courthouse	Grand Isle County Courthouse	January 11, 1996 (#95001523)	U.S. Route 2; 44°49′07″N 73°17′24″W	North Hero	
4	Ira Hill House	Ira Hill House	November 13, 2003 (#03001164)	2304 Main St. 44°52′40″N 73°20′21″W	Isle La Motte	
5	Hyde Log Cabin	Hyde Log Cabin	March 11, 1971 (#71000057)	U.S. Route 2; 44°43′34″N 73°17′32″W	Grand Isle	
6	Methodist Episcopal Church of Isle La Motte	Methodist Episcopal Church of Isle La Motte	March 2, 2001 (#01000223)	67 Church St. 44°52′37″N 73°20′17″W	Isle La Motte	
7	Providence Island Canal Sloop		June 15, 2026 (#100013117)	Lake Champlain; 44°36′00″N 73°21′29″W	South Hero vicinity	
8	Rutland Railroad Pumping Station	Rutland Railroad Pumping Station	December 30, 1999 (#99001630)	43 Lake St. 44°58′29″N 73°18′37″W	Alburg	
9	South Hero Inn	South Hero Inn	April 16, 1975 (#75000141)	South St. and U.S. Route 2; 44°38′42″N 73°18′13″W	South Hero	
10	South Hero Village Historic District	South Hero Village Historic District	March 11, 2024 (#100010055)	U.S. Route 2, Hill Road, South Street; 44°38′45″N 73°18′10″W	South Hero	
11	South Stone School House	South Stone School House	January 31, 1997 (#97000025)	VT 129 at its junction with Quarry Rd. 44°51′07″N 73°20′40″W	Isle La Motte	
12	U.S. Inspection Station-Alburg Springs, Vermont	U.S. Inspection Station-Alburg Springs, Vermont	September 10, 2014 (#14000607)	303 Alburg Springs Rd. 45°00′46″N 73°12′45″W	Alburg	

== See also ==
- List of National Historic Landmarks in Vermont
- National Register of Historic Places listings in Vermont
