= Cedar Island (Grand Isle County, Vermont) =

Island in Grand Isle County, Vermont, United States

Coordinates: 44°39′33″N 73°15′14″W

Cedar Island is a 10-acre (4 ha) island located in Lake Champlain. It is the southernmost of three islands to the east of South Hero, Vermont. Cedar Island lies approximately two miles (3.2 km) north of the Sand Bar Bridge.

Cedar Island is privately owned and accessible only by boat.
