= South Hero Inn =

- U.S. National Register of Historic Places
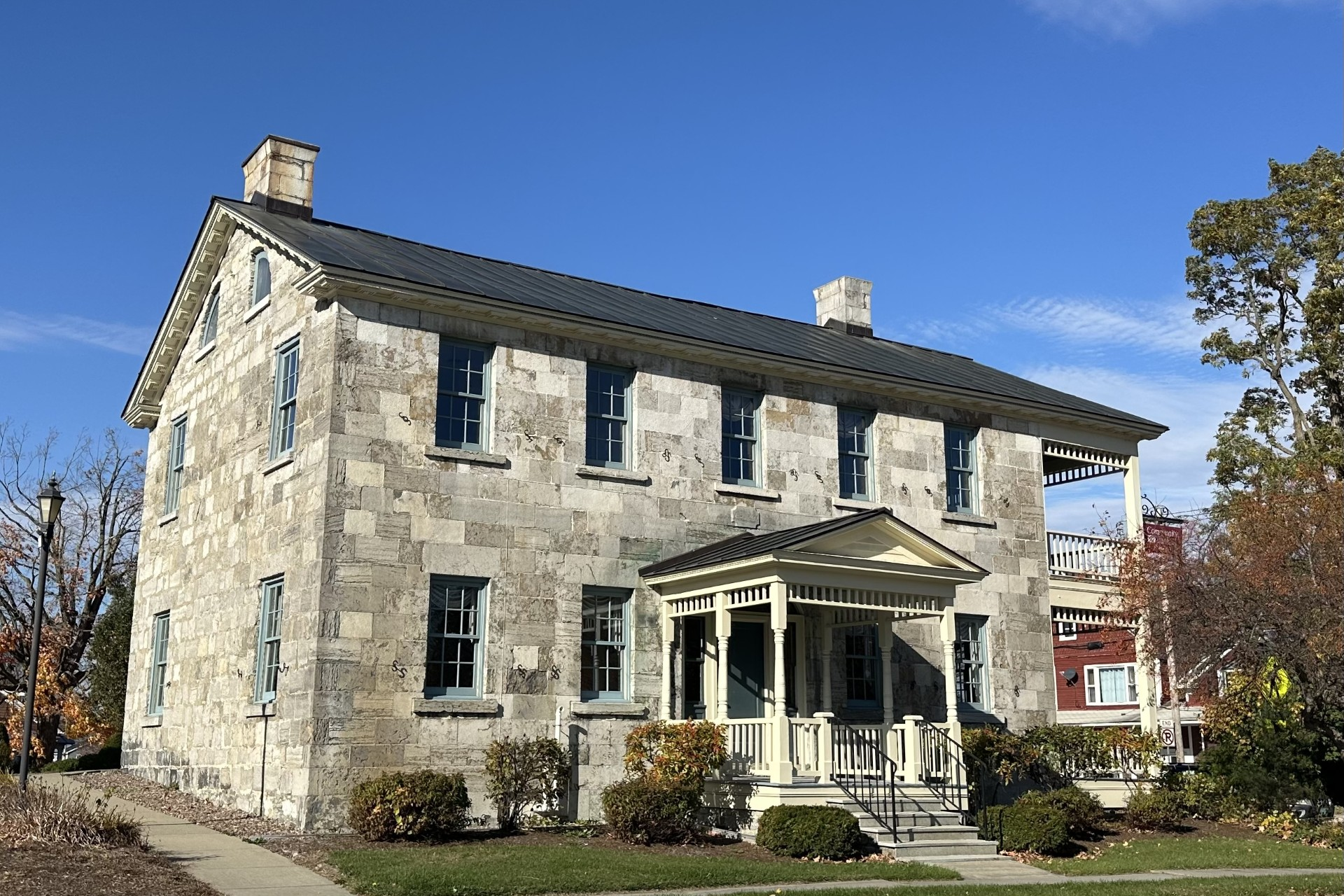

- Location within Vermont Location within the United States
- Location: South St. and U.S. 2, South Hero, Vermont
- Coordinates: 44°38′42″N 73°18′13″W
- Area: 1 acre (0.40 ha)
- Built: 1829
- Architectural style: Greek Revival, Federal
- NRHP reference No.: 75000141
- Added to NRHP: April 16, 1975

The South Hero Inn is a historic commercial building at 301 United States Route 2 (corner of South Street) in the center of South Hero, Vermont. Built in 1829, it is a prominent local example of a stone building with Federal and Greek Revival features, and served as a traveler accommodation until the early 1970s. It was listed on the National Register of Historic Places in 1975. It now houses a branch of Community Bank, N.A.

== Description and history ==
The former South Hero Inn building occupies a prominent location at the central intersection of South Hero, set at the southwest corner of its major crossroads, the junction of South Street and US 2. It is a 2 1/2-story stone structure, with a gabled roof and a two-story wood-frame ell projecting to the west. It presents formal facades to both roads, with its main roof gable set parallel to South Street. The more elaborate facade faces US 2, with a two-story porch across the three-bay facade, supported by square posts, with a decorative valance and low balustrades. The gable above the porch has modillion blocks in the eaves, and a Federal style fan at the center of the pediment. The facade facing South Street is five bays, with a center entrance flanked by sidelight windows and sheltered by a gabled porch with a similar valance and turned posts. Most windows are sash, set in rectangular openings. The walls consist of quarried square-cut hammered stone blocks.

The inn was built in 1829 and served as an accommodation for travelers until the 1970s. It is set on a historically major travel route between Burlington and points in Canada, and in the later 19th century served tourists and people taking the cures of local mineral springs.

== See also ==
- National Register of Historic Places listings in Grand Isle County, Vermont
