= Sarah M. Dawson Merrill =

Sarah M. Dawson Merrill (1843–1899) was an American educator. Identified with various educational and other public institutions, her services to education and especially to the education of the blind were important. Merrill was the founder and first principal of the Willard Hall School for Girls.

== Early life and education ==
Sarah M. Dawson was born in South Hero, Vermont, in 1843.

She was educated in the schools of Hinesburg, Vermont and Brandon, Vermont, and later was graduated from Mrs. Lay's seminary in Montreal.

== Career ==
She was teaching in Boston at the age of 17 years. She taught next at Lyons Female College, Clinton, Iowa before returning to Boston as first assistant in the Burroughs Street Boys' Grammar School, leaving that to go to the Perkins School for the Blind at South Boston. She was also at the Royal Normal Academy and College for the Blind in London, England, for more than two years, and from that institution, she went to Glasgow, Scotland, to reorganize the work for the blind in that city. Following these experiences, she was for seven years, in charge of the scientific department in Bradford academy.

In 1883, she married Mr. Henry M. Merrill, of Danvers, Massachusetts, and from that date, she lived in Danvers. From 1887, she opened in a home that Mr. Merrill had built on Elm street a boarding and day school for young ladies, under the name of the Willard Home School. In 1893, after being widowed, Merrill removed the school to larger buildings, which she remodelled, enlarged, and renamed Willard Hall.

== Death ==
Sarah M. Dawson Merrill died in Danvers, Massachusetts on August 17, 1899.
