= Methodist Episcopal Church of Isle La Motte =

Historic church in Vermont, United States

United Methodist Church of Isle La Motte
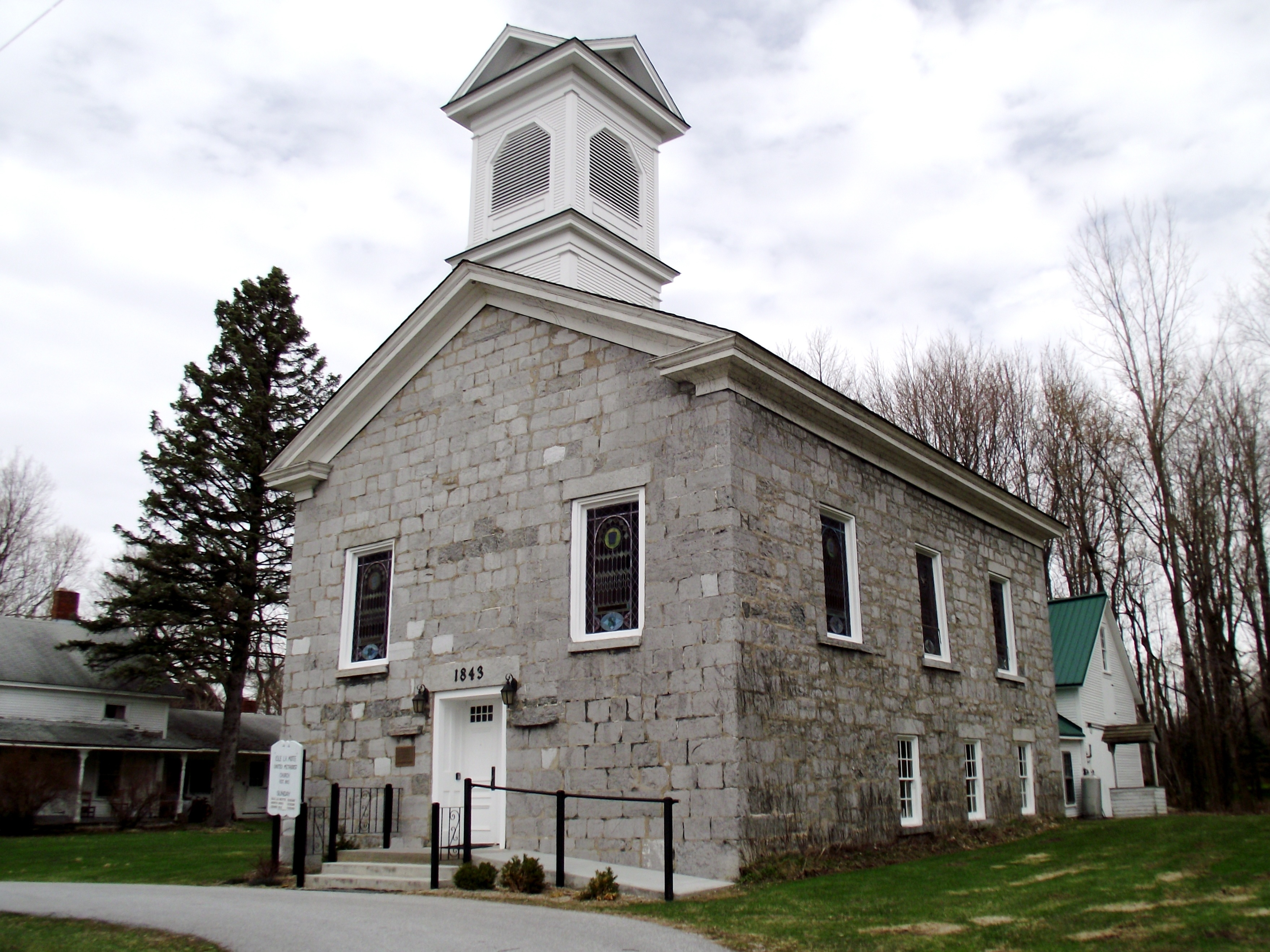
- United Methodist Church of Isle La Motte
- 44°52′37″N 73°20′17″W
- Location: 67 Church St., Isle La Motte, Vermont
- Country: United States
- Denomination: United Methodist
- Website: Champlain Islands UMC
- Methodist Episcopal Church of Isle La Motte
- U.S. National Register of Historic Places
- Location within Vermont Location within the United States
- Area: 0.5 acres (0.20 ha)
- Built: 1843
- Architect: James Ritchie
- Architectural style: Greek Revival
- MPS: Religious Buildings, Sites and Structures in Vermont MPS
- NRHP reference No.: 01000223
- Added to NRHP: March 2, 2001

The United Methodist Church of Isle La Motte, also previously known as the Methodist Episcopal Church of Isle La Motte and known locally as the Old Stone Church, is a historic church in Isle La Motte, Vermont. Built in 1843 by a prominent local Scottish stonemason, its basement was used until 1892 for town meetings and a school, while the upstairs was used for religious services. It was listed on the National Register of Historic Places in 2001.

== Architecture and history ==
The church stands east of the central Four Corners intersection in Isle La Motte's rural town center, on the north side of Church Street. It is set back from the street, with a semicircular drive in front. The building is rectangular, two bays wide and three deep, and is built out of gray limestone. The stone is regularly cut and laid in courses joined by lime mortar. It is topped by a gabled roof, from which a two-stage square wood-frame tower rises to a cross-gabled roof. Stained glass windows are set in rectangular openings with stone sills and lintels. The main entrance is at the center of the front facade, capped by a stone lintel which bears the building's construction date.

Isle La Motte's Methodist congregation met in private homes and other spaces prior to the construction of this edifice. It was built in 1843 by stonemason James Ritchie, a prominent local Scottish immigrant stonemason, and is probably his finest work. The land was donated by Ira Hill, (whose house Ritchie also built). The main level was used for church services, and the basement was divided into two spaces, one used as a school and the other as a town meeting space. This situation continued until 1892, when the town and school functions were moved out. In the 20th century the Methodist congregation merged with several other denominations to form the congregation that now owns the building.

== See also ==
- National Register of Historic Places listings in Grand Isle County, Vermont
