= Whiteley Township, Pennsylvania =

Township in Pennsylvania, US

Coordinates: 39°50′00″N 80°06′59″W

Whiteley Township, Greene County, Pennsylvania
- Township
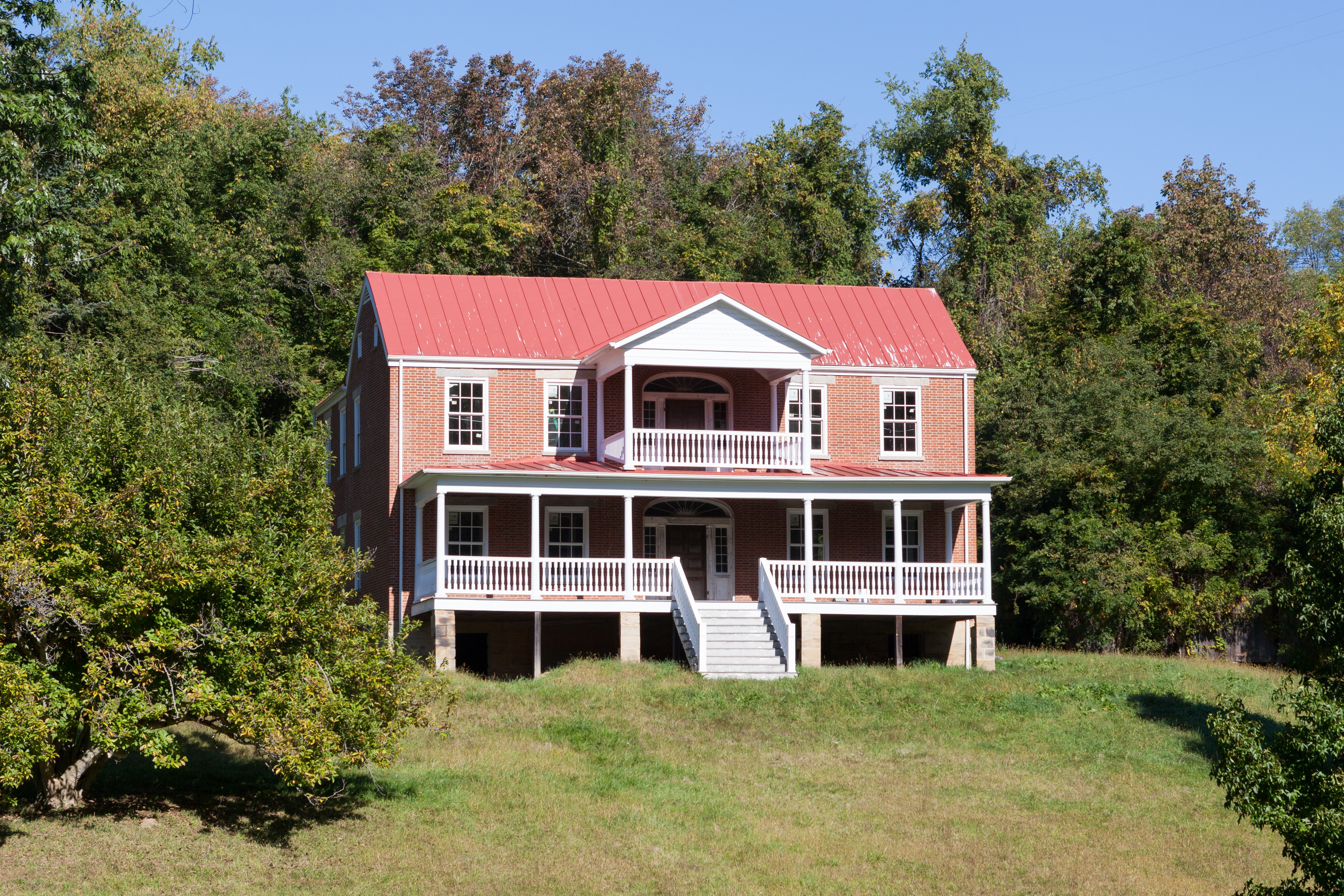
- The Hamilton-Ely Farmstead, a historic site in the township

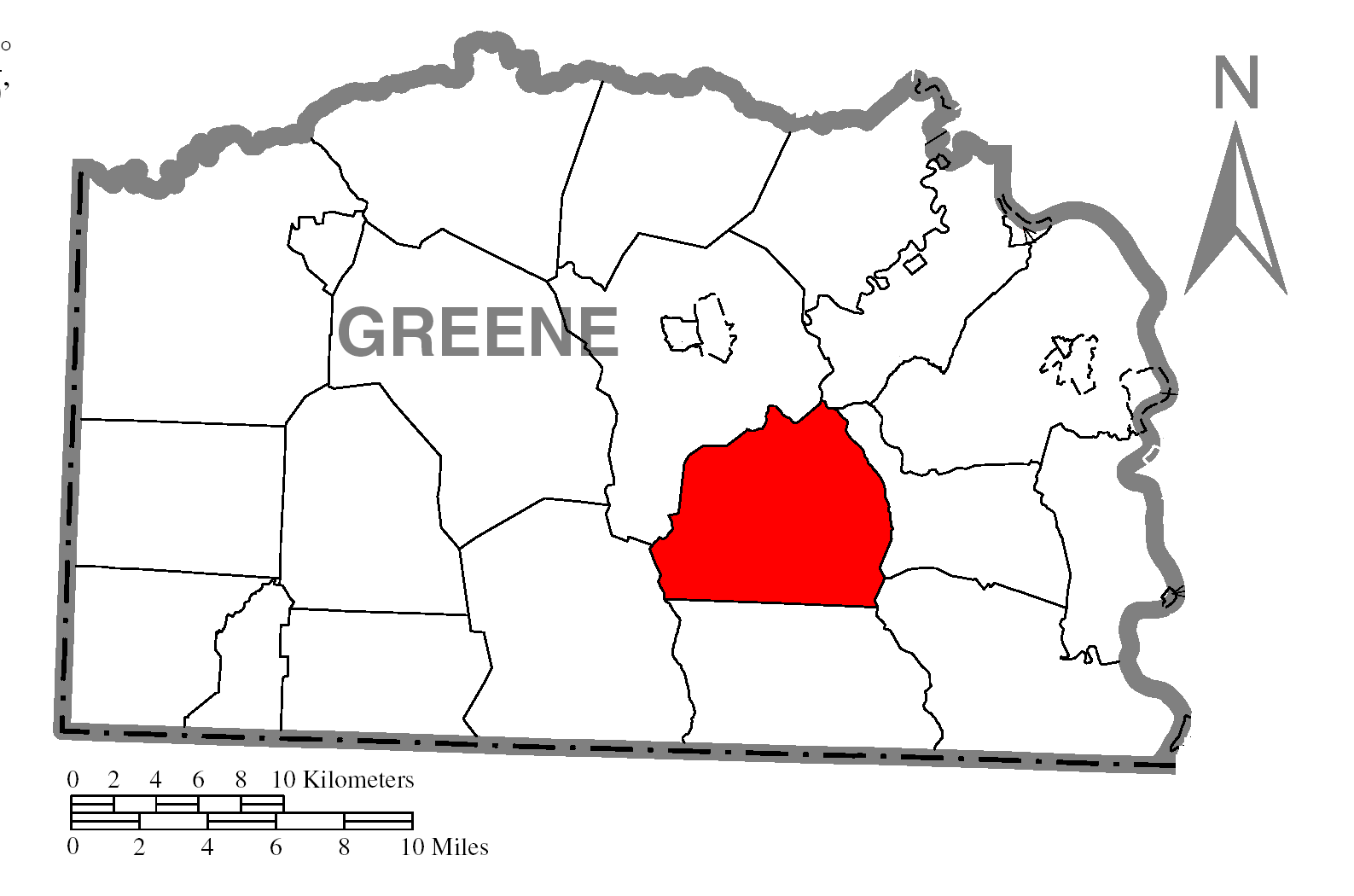
- Location of Whiteley Township in Greene County

- Location of Greene County in Pennsylvania
- Country: United States
- State: Pennsylvania
- County: Greene

Area
  - Total: 31.66 sq mi (82.01 km^{2})
  - Land: 31.66 sq mi (82.00 km^{2})
  - Water: 0.0039 sq mi (0.01 km^{2})

Population (2020)
  - Total: 570 ▼
  - Estimate (2023): 542
  - Density: 19.8/sq mi (7.65/km^{2})
- Time zone: UTC-4 (EST)
  - Summer (DST): UTC-5 (EDT)
- Area code: 724
- FIPS code: 42-059-84608

Whiteley Township is in Greene County, Pennsylvania, United States. The population was 570 at the time of the 2020 census, which was a decrease from 649 at the 2010 census.

== History ==
The Hamilton-Ely Farmstead and George West Gordon Farm are listed on the National Register of Historic Places.

== Geography ==
Whiteley Township is southeast of the center of Greene County between Waynesburg to the north and Mount Morris to the south. Interstate 79 passes through the eastern side of the township, with access from Exit 7 (Kirby Road). U.S. Route 19 passes through the center of the township, running roughly parallel to I-79, and goes through Kirby, the main settlement in the township.

According to the United States Census Bureau, the township has a total area of 31.7 square miles (82.0 km^{2}), of which 0.004 square miles (0.01 km^{2}), or 0.01%, are water.

== Surrounding neighborhoods ==
Whitely Township has six borders, including the townships of Jefferson to the north-northeast, Greene from the northeast to the east, Dunkard to the southeast, Perry to the south, Wayne to the southwest and Franklin from the west to the north.

== Demographics ==
Historical population
Census	Pop.	Note	%±
2000	754		—
2010	649		−13.9%
2020	570		−12.2%
2025 (est.)	546		−4.2%
U.S. Decennial Census

As of the census of 2000, there were 754 people, 283 households, and 213 families residing in the township. The population density was 24.1 people per square mile (9.3/km^{2}). There were 320 housing units at an average density of 10.2/sq mi (4.0/km^{2}).

The racial makeup of the township was 98.54% White, 0.13% African American, 0.53% Native American, 0.13% Asian, and 0.66% from two or more races. Hispanic or Latino of any race were 0.53% of the population.

There were 283 households, out of which 42.0% had children under the age of eighteen living with them, 64.0% were married couples living together, 7.8% had a female householder with no husband present, and 24.7% were non-families. 21.2% of all households were made up of individuals, and 8.1% had someone living alone who was sixty-five years of age or older.

The average household size was 2.66 and the average family size was 3.12.

Within the township, the population was spread out, with 26.9% of residents who were under the age of eighteen, 8.0% who were aged eighteen to twenty-four, 31.4% who were aged twenty-five to forty-four, 22.9% who were aged forty-five to sixty-four, and 10.7% who were sixty-five years of age or older. The median age was thirty-six years.

For every one hundred females, there were 95.3 males. For every one hundred females who were aged eighteen or older, there were 96.8 males.

The median income for a household in the township was $33,438, and the median income for a family was $39,464. Males had a median income of $35,375 compared with that $18,125 for females.

The per capita income for the township was $14,906.

Approximately 15.9% of families and 18.2% of the population were living below the poverty line, including 24.9% of those who were under the age of eighteen and 14.3% of those who were aged sixty-five or older.
