= South Stone School House =

- U.S. National Register of Historic Places
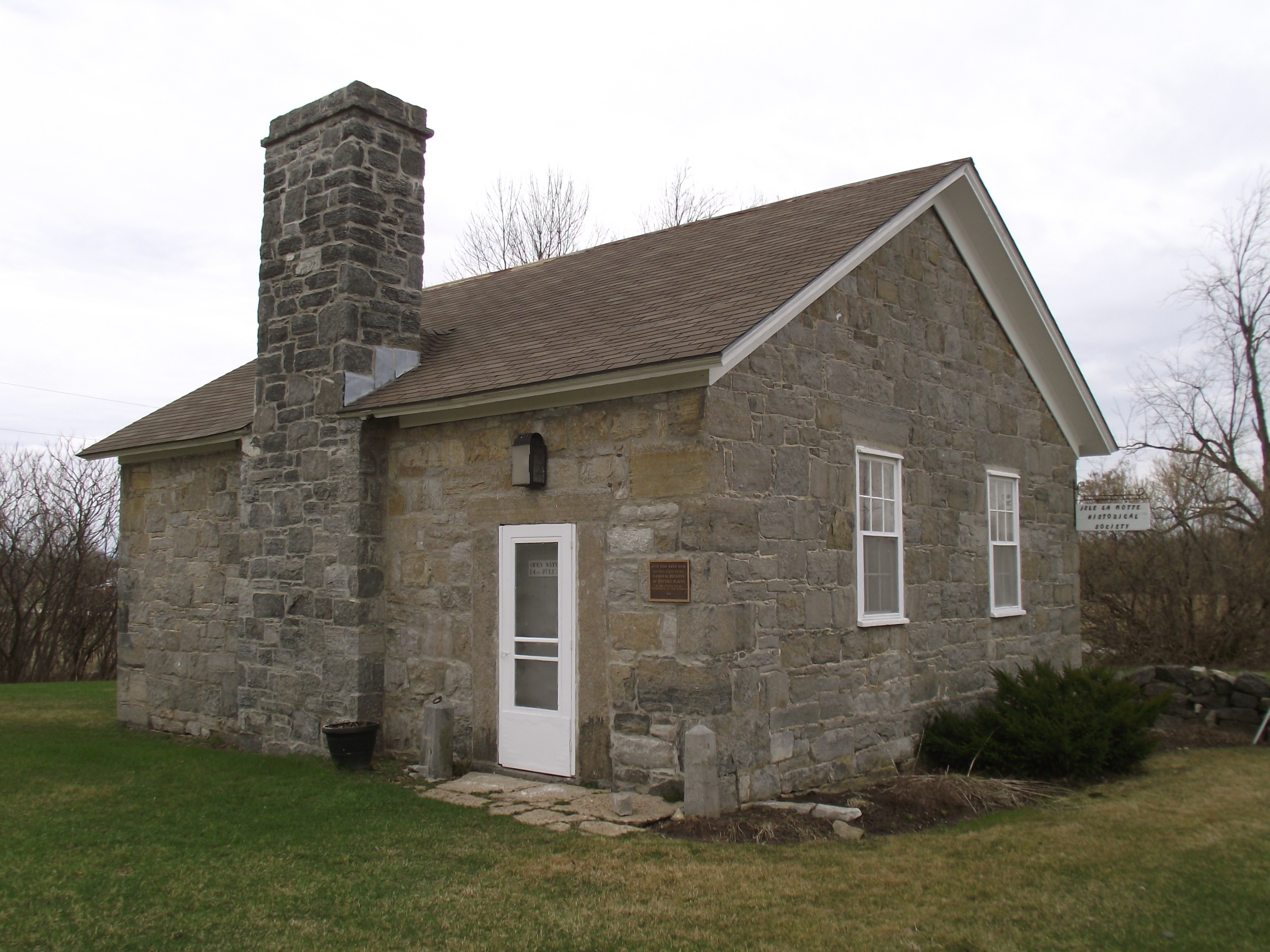

- Location within Vermont Location within the United States
- Location: Main St., jct. with Quarry Rd., Isle La Motte, Vermont
- Coordinates: 44°51′7″N 73°20′40″W
- Area: 0.3 acres (0.12 ha)
- Built: 1843
- MPS: Educational Resources of Vermont MPS
- NRHP reference No.: 97000025
- Added to NRHP: January 31, 1997

The South Stone School House is a historic school building at Main Street and Quarry Road in Isle La Motte, Vermont. Built in 1843, it served the town as a district school until 1932, and has served as home to its historical society since then. It was probably built by James Ritchie, a noted local Scottish immigrant mason, and was listed on the National Register of Historic Places in 1997.

== Description and history ==
The South Stone School House is located in the center of the southern part of the island, at the southeast corner of Main Street and Quarry Road. It is a single-story structure, built out of locally quarried limestone that is known in the trade as "black marble". The stones are typically rough-cut and ashlar rectangular blocks, with irregular gaps filled in by smaller stones in a technique long associated with Scottish masonry. The gabled roof is framed with wooden timbers, and a wide stone chimney rises from one of the long sides, just to the left of the doorway. The interior has a single large chamber, finished with pine wainscoting and plaster on the walls. It now houses displays of materials concerning the long history of the island.

The school was built about 1842, and served the town as a district school until its schools were consolidated in 1930. Its construction has hallmarks of having been built by James Ritchie, a locally prominent master mason who came here from Scotland, and is credited with the construction of at least six other surviving buildings on the island. The local historical society purchased the building in 1932, and has used it as a museum and meeting space since.

== See also ==
- National Register of Historic Places listings in Grand Isle County, Vermont
