= Leonard Gordon Homestead, Hexagonal Grain Crib =

- Formerly listed on the U.S. National Register of Historic Places
- Location within Arkansas Location within the United States
- Nearest city: Twentythree, Arkansas
- Coordinates: 35°22′34″N 91°36′1″W
- Area: less than one acre
- Built: 1920
- Architectural style: Vernacular agricultural
- MPS: White County MPS
- NRHP reference No.: 91001311

Significant dates
- Added to NRHP: July 21, 1992
- Removed from NRHP: January 24, 2017

The Leonard Gordon Homestead, Hexagonal Grain Crib is a historic farm outbuilding in rural White County, Arkansas. It is located off County Road 69, north of Bald Knob. It is a single-story wood-frame structure, finished in board and batten siding and topped by a hexagonal hip roof. It exhibits a high quality of craftsmanship in the mitering of its structural members, suggesting it was intended to be a visually striking structure. Built about 1920, it is the only hexagonal structure identified in an architectural survey of the county.

The structure was listed on the National Register of Historic Places in 1992, and was delisted in 2017.

== See also ==
- National Register of Historic Places listings in White County, Arkansas
