= Rutland Railroad Pumping Station =

- U.S. National Register of Historic Places
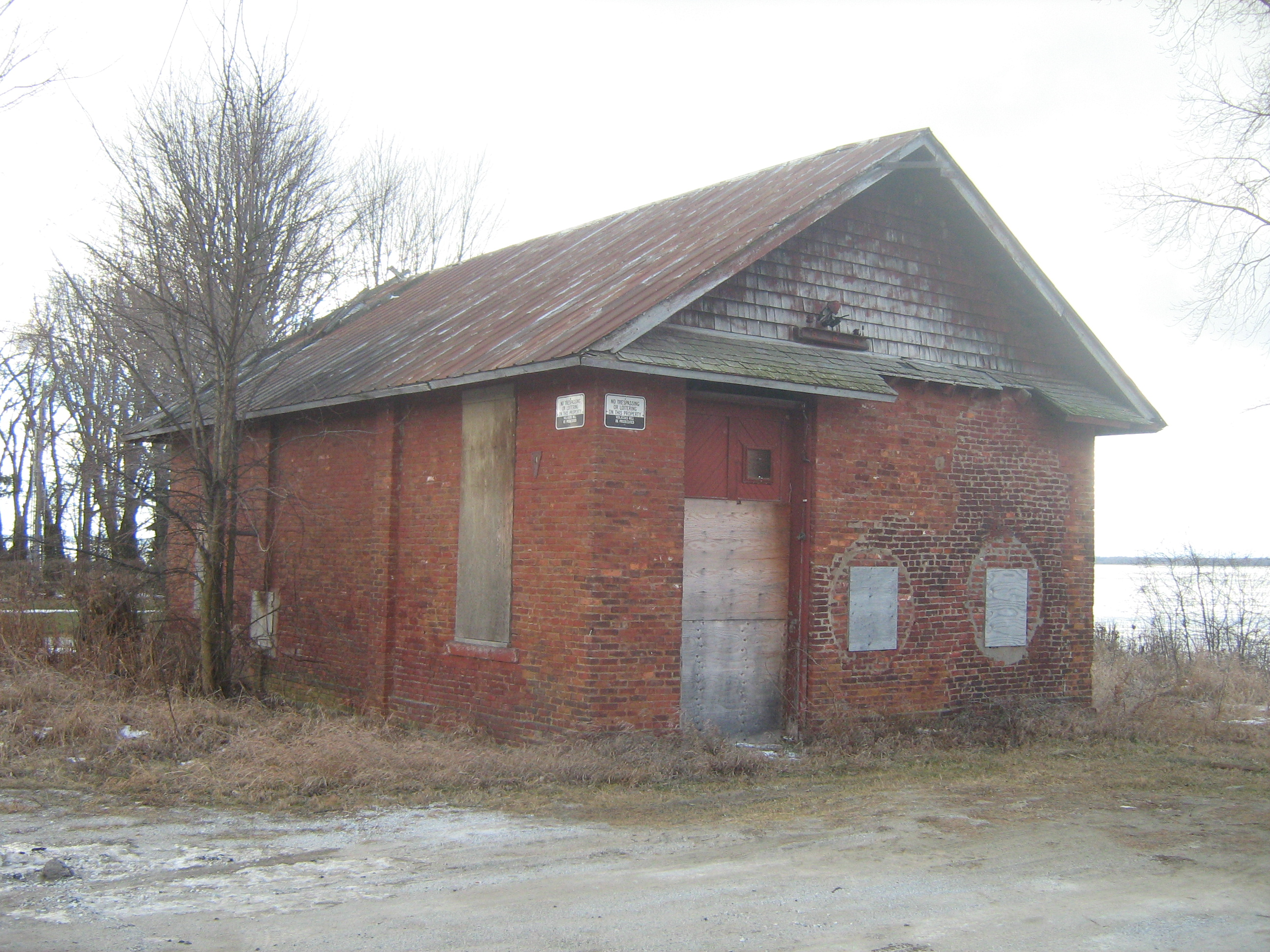

- Location within Vermont Location within the United States
- Location: 43 Lake St., Alburgh, Vermont
- Coordinates: 44°58′29″N 73°18′37″W
- Area: less than one acre
- Built: 1903
- Built by: Rutland Railroad
- NRHP reference No.: 99001630
- Added to NRHP: December 30, 1999

The Rutland Railroad Pumping Station is a historic water pumping facility at 43 Lake Street in the town of Alburgh, Vermont. Built in 1903, it is a rare example in Vermont of an early railroad-related water pumping facility. In use until the 1940s, it provided water needed for steam engines at rail facilities elsewhere in Alburgh. It is now owned by the town, and was listed on the National Register of Historic Places in 1999.

== Description and history ==
The former Rutland Railroad Pumping Station stands on the eastern shore of Lake Champlain, at the western end of Lake Street. It is a modest rectangular brick building, with a gabled roof and stone foundation. The north-facing front is three bays wide, with a doorway in the left bay and rectangular window openings to the right. All of the building openings have been boarded over. The window openings are set in what were once round openings for pipes, as evidenced by infill brickwork. The interior of the building is single open space with a poured concrete floor. Equipment, most dating to the mid-20th century, is located at the southern end. It includes a gasoline motor, electric motor, and water pump.

The Rutland Railroad, in a bid to expand service north of Burlington, capitalized on the financial difficulties of the competing Central Vermont Railroad to acquire rights to the railway crossing between Alburgh and Ogdensburg, New York in 1897. It then built a major railyard in Alburgh, a presence that is largely no longer evident. This pumping station was constructed about 1903 to provided water from the lake to the railyards, for use in the railroad's steam-powered locomotives. It also served as a water supply for parts of the town. During the first half of the 20th century, steam engines were supplanted by more efficient diesel and electric power, and the pumping station was functionally abandoned. The town acquired the building from the railroad in 1954; its modern water supply plant stands nearby.

== See also ==
- National Register of Historic Places listings in Grand Isle County, Vermont
