= Hamilton-Ely Farmstead =

Historic house in Pennsylvania, United States

- U.S. National Register of Historic Places
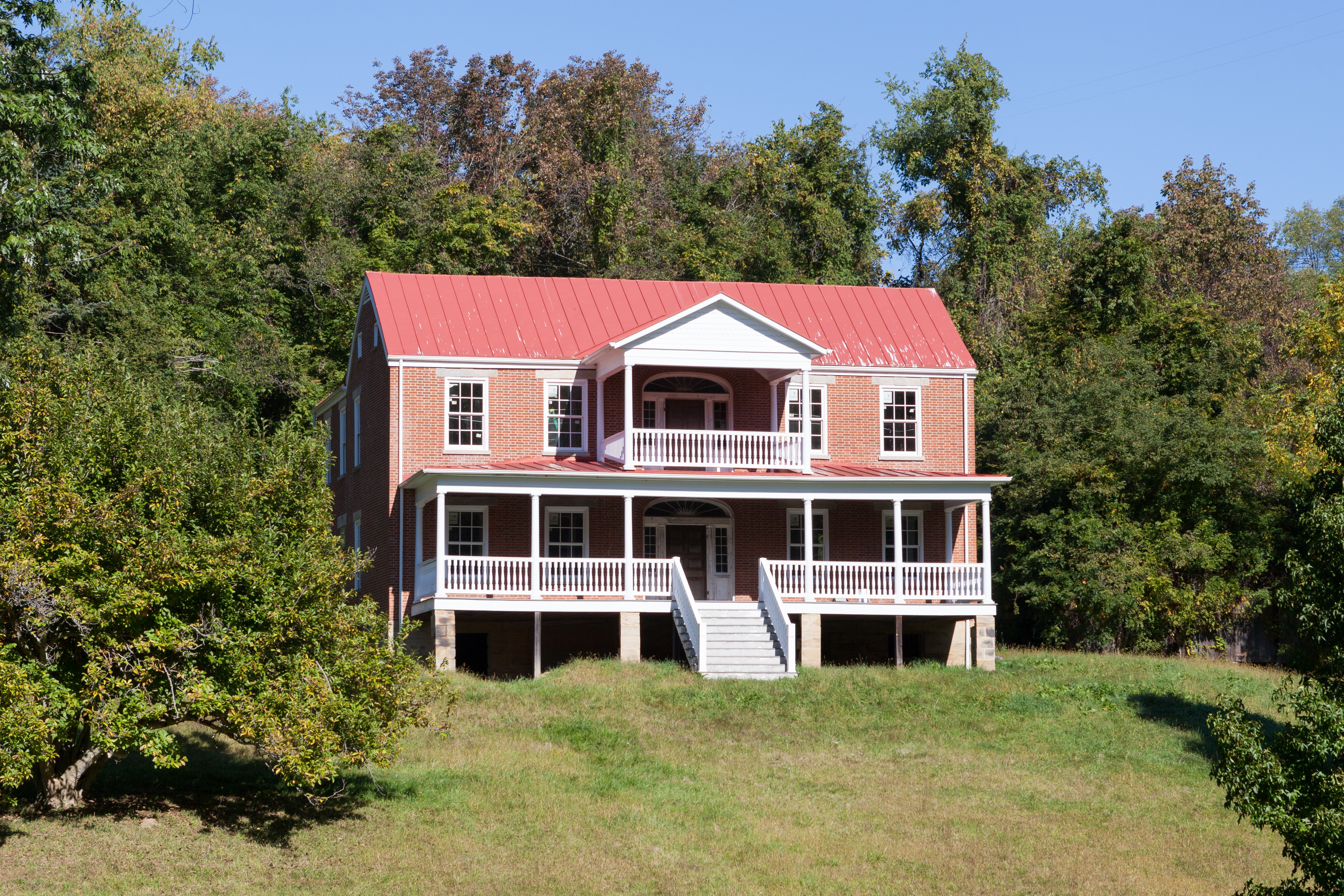
- The farm house in September 2014

- Location within Pennsylvania Location within the United States
- Location: 1055 Sugar Run Rd., Whiteley Township, Pennsylvania
- Coordinates: 39°50′17″N 80°10′43″W
- Area: 2 acres (0.81 ha)
- Built by: Jack Hamilton, et al.
- Architectural style: Greek Revival, Federal, Colonial Revival
- NRHP reference No.: 06000098
- Added to NRHP: March 2, 2006

The Hamilton-Ely Farmstead, also known as the Evelyn Minor House, is a historic home located in Whiteley Township in Greene County, Pennsylvania.

It was listed on the National Register of Historic Places in 2006.

== History and architectural features ==
The house was built around 1835, and is a two-story, five-bay dwelling with a gable roof and a blend of Federal, Greek Revival, and Colonial Revival-style details. The front facade features a two-story porch with Tuscan order columns.

Also located on the property are a contributing barn, which was erected sometime around 1930, a spring house that was built circa 1803, a wash house that was erected sometime around 1870, and a drive-through corn crib that was built between 1872 and 1874.
