= Alburg Springs–Clarenceville Border Crossing =

Border crossing between the US and Canada

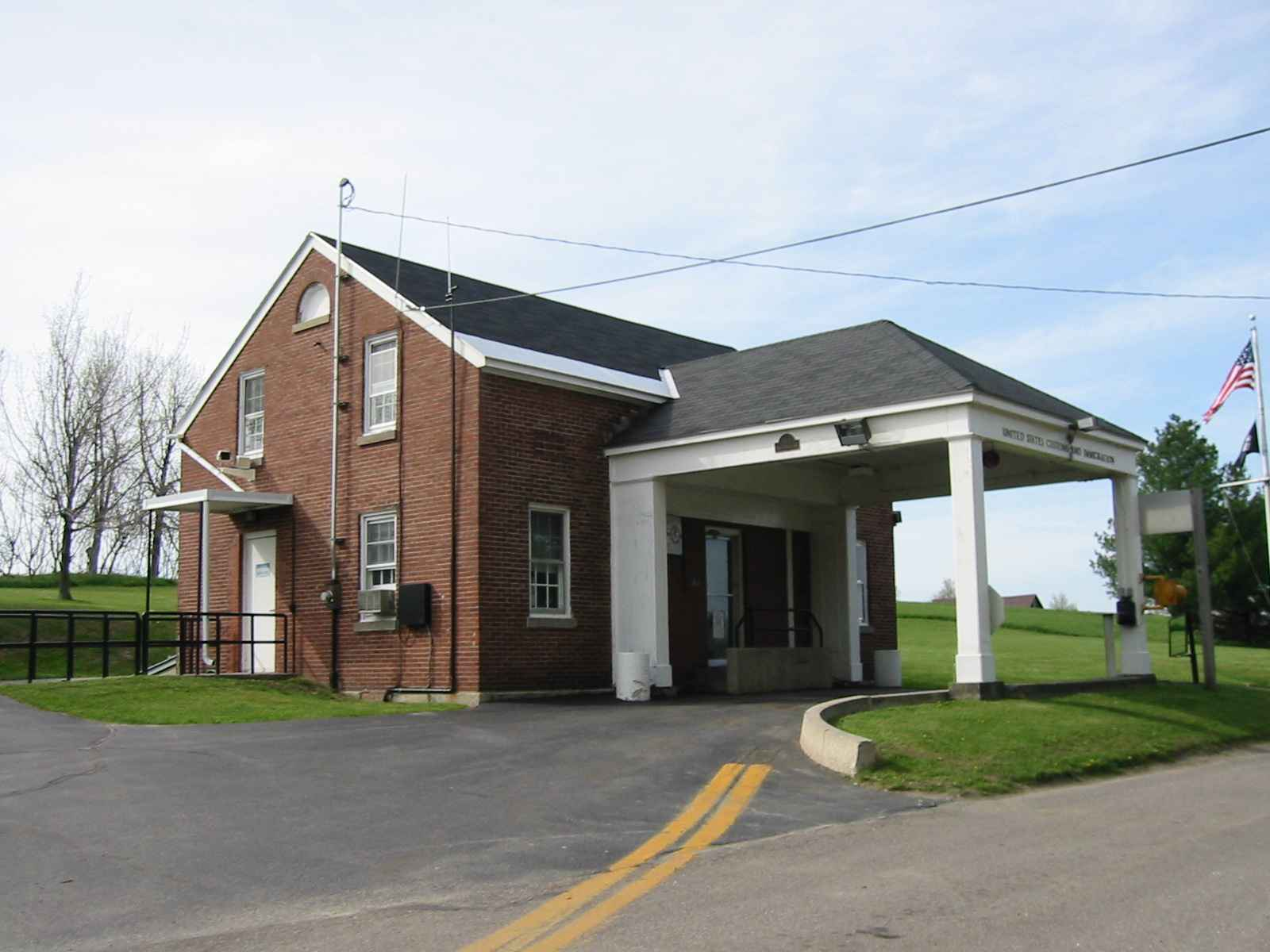
- US Border Inspection Station, Alburg Springs, Vermont

Location
- Country: United States; Canada
- Location: Alburg Springs Road / Chemin Beech Sud; US Port: 303 Alburg Springs Road, Alburgh, Vermont 05440; Canadian Port: 2500 Beech Road, Clarenceville, Quebec J0J 1B0
- Coordinates: 45.013042°N 73.212183°W

Details
- Opened: 1933

Website
- Official Canadian website https://www.cbp.gov/contact/ports/highgate-springs-vermont-0212
- U.S. Inspection Station-Alburg Springs, Vermont
- U.S. National Register of Historic Places
- MPS: U.S. Border Inspection Stations MPS
- NRHP reference No.: 14000607
- Added to NRHP: September 10, 2014

The Alburg Springs–Clarenceville Border Crossing connects the villages of Clarenceville, Quebec and Alburgh, Vermont on the Canada–United States border. The border crossing is open daily between 8:00 AM and 4:00 pm. Canada built a new border inspection station in 2005, while the US continues to use its Depression-era border station, listed on the National Register of Historic Places in 2014.

== United States border station ==
The United States border station is located on the west side of Alburg Springs Road, just south of the border. The inspection station is a two-story brick building, with a gabled roof, and a hip-roofed porte-cochere that extends across the southbound traffic way. The building has Colonial Revival styling, and is basically symmetrical, with a center entrance and flanking sash windows with concrete sills. Set above each window is a decorative brickwork element. The porte-cochere is supported by square wooden columns (engaged to the building at the western end), with a wraparound frieze below the roof. The building interior, originally predominantly living space, is now office space on the ground floor. The upstairs living spaces retain most of their original finishes.

The station was built in 1937, and follows a standard plan for a 3-bay inspection building. Originally seven such stations were built on the Canadian border, and this is one of two that survive with only modest alteration. (The other is at the Ferry-Midway Border Crossing in Ferry County, Washington.) It was built as part of a program to improve border security, prompted by the increasing use of the automobile, the smuggling of alcohol during Prohibition, and the tightening of immigration laws in the early 1920s. Because of its remote location, it was designed to include housing for the principal customs and immigration officers and their families. These stations were designed in the Colonial Revival style as a distinctive nod to American architectural heritage. The facility was listed on the National Register of Historic Places in 2014.

== Canada border station ==
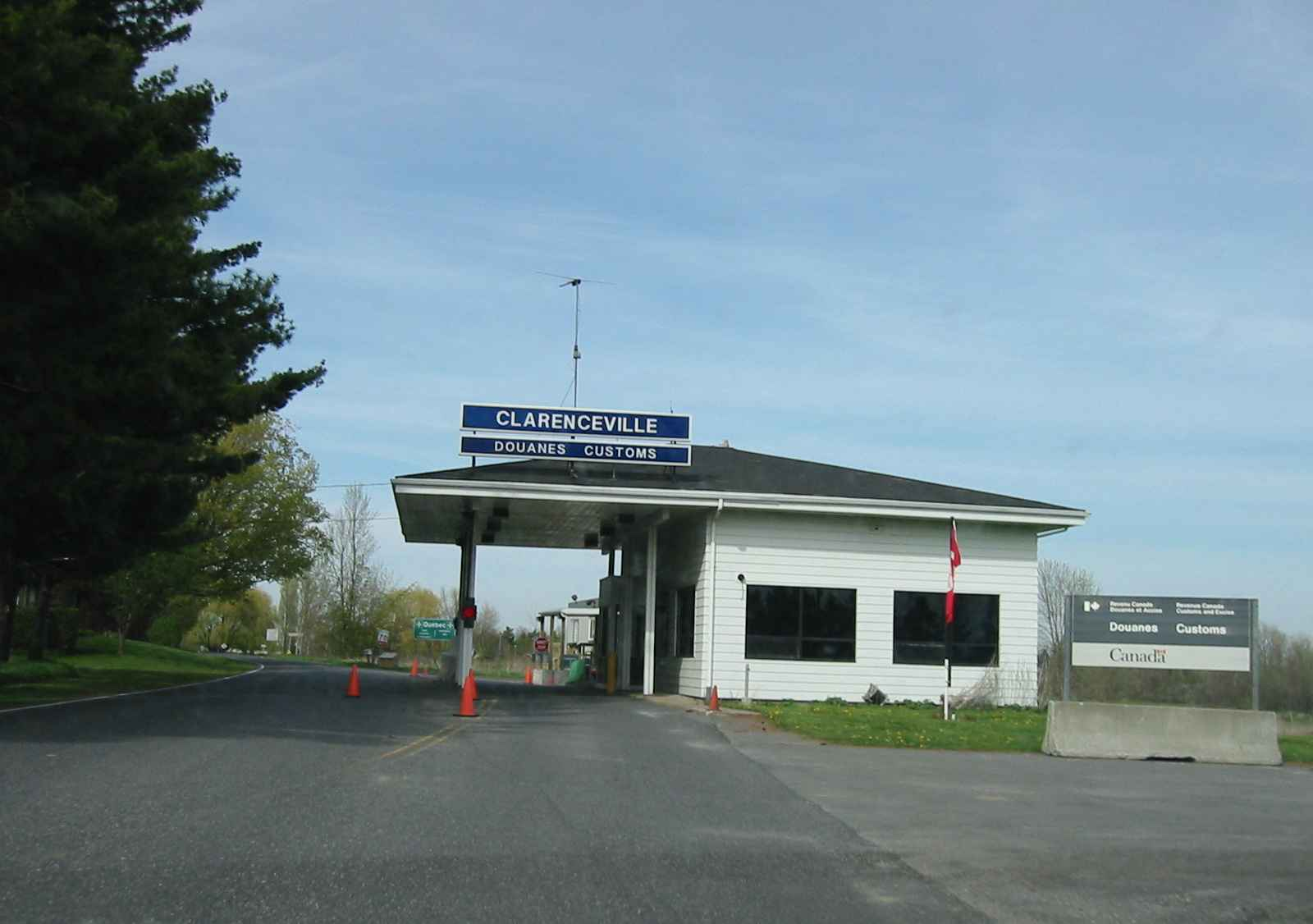
Canada border inspection station at Clarenceville, QC as seen in 2002

The current Canada border station was built in 2005. Prior to that, Canada utilized the 1940s-era border station (pictured), a design that was widely used throughout the US-Canada border.

== See also ==
- List of Canada–United States border crossings
- National Register of Historic Places listings in Grand Isle County, Vermont
