= South Hero (CDP), Vermont =

Census-designated place in Vermont, United States

South Hero, Vermont
- Census-designated place
- Location within Vermont Location within the United States
- Coordinates: 44°38′52″N 73°18′06″W
- Country: United States
- State: Vermont
- County: Grand Isle
- Town: South Hero

Area
  - Total: 1.43 sq mi (3.70 km^{2})
  - Land: 1.08 sq mi (2.80 km^{2})
  - Water: 0.35 sq mi (0.90 km^{2})
- Elevation: 138 ft (42 m)

Population (2020)
  - Total: 225
- Time zone: UTC-5 (Eastern (EST))
  - Summer (DST): UTC-4 (EDT)
- ZIP Code: 05486
- Area code: 802
- FIPS code: 50-66925
- GNIS feature ID: 2586654

South Hero is the primary village and a census-designated place (CDP) in the town of South Hero, Grand Isle County, Vermont, United States. As of the 2020 census it had a population of 225, out of 1,674 in the entire town of South Hero.

== Geography ==
The CDP is in southern Grand Isle County, on the Lake Champlain island of South Hero in the center of the town of the same name. It is bordered to the north by Keeler Bay, an arm of the east channel of Lake Champlain. U.S. Route 2 passes through the village, leading southeast 18 miles (29 km) to Burlington and north 26 miles (42 km) to Alburgh.
