= Grand Isle County Courthouse =

- U.S. National Register of Historic Places
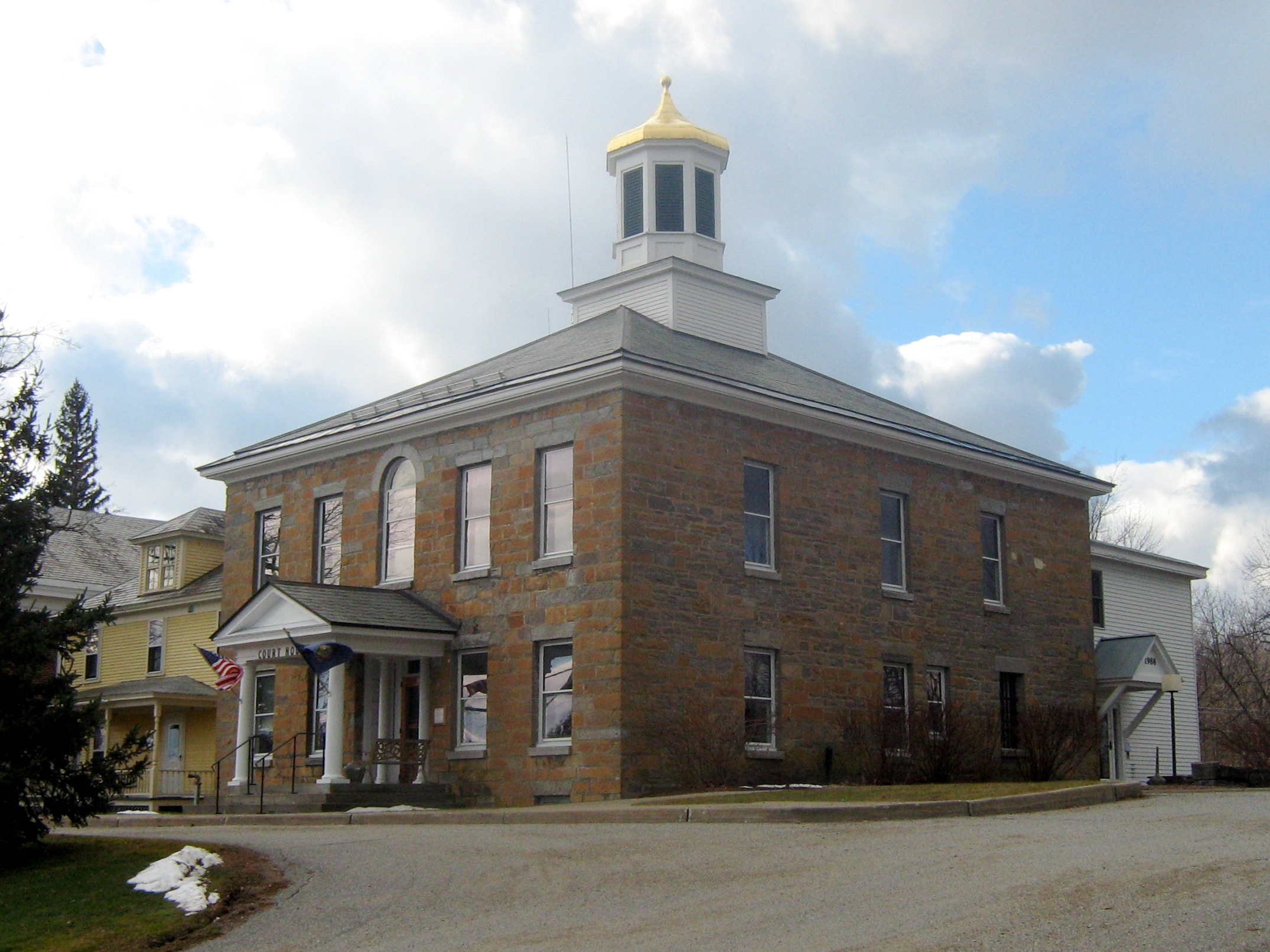

- Location within Vermont Location within the United States
- Interactive map showing the location of Grand Isle County Courthouse
- Location: 3677 US 2, North Hero, Vermont
- Coordinates: 44°49′7″N 73°17′24″W
- Area: 1 acre (0.40 ha)
- Built: 1824
- Built by: Mott, Strong & Mott
- Architectural style: Federal
- NRHP reference No.: 95001523
- Added to NRHP: January 11, 1996

The Grand Isle County Courthouse is located at 3677 United States Route 2 in the center of North Hero, the county seat of Grand Isle County, Vermont. Built in 1824, it is one of the oldest surviving courthouses in the state, and the only surviving one built out of stone. It was listed on the National Register of Historic Places in 1996.

== Description and history ==
The Grand Isle County Courthouse is prominently sited in the linear town center of North Hero, placed on a rise on the west side of US 2 overlooking City Bay. Its main block is a two-story stone structure, built out of locally quarried limestone and covered by a hip roof. An octagonal belfry rises from the center of the roof, and is covered by a gold octagonal onion dome. The main facade is five bays wide, with the entrance at the center, sheltered by a gabled portico with Tuscan columns. Above the entrance is a round-arched sash window; the other windows are rectangular sash, set in openings with granite sills and lintels. A shed-roof addition extends to the rear, and a second ell connects the main block to a two-story wood-frame house (formerly a jailer's residence) to the left.

Grand Isle County was organized in 1802, with North Hero named its county seat in 1804. Its early court sessions were held in private facilities such as the hotel and tavern of Jed Ladd, built in North Hero in 1803. With the county rising in population and prosperity, the matter of a permanent courthouse arose in 1823, resulting in the construction of this courthouse's main block the following year. Although there is no documentary support, it may have been designed by Scottish mason James Ritchie, who is credited with building most of the area's few surviving stone buildings of the period. The courthouse initially served as a court, jail, town hall, and church. In 1865 the town hall and church functions were removed to the newly built meeting house next door. In the early 20th century the building underwent further alteration, including construction of the adjacent jailer's house.

== See also ==
- National Register of Historic Places listings in Grand Isle County, Vermont
