= Ira Hill House =

Historic house in Vermont, United States

- U.S. National Register of Historic Places
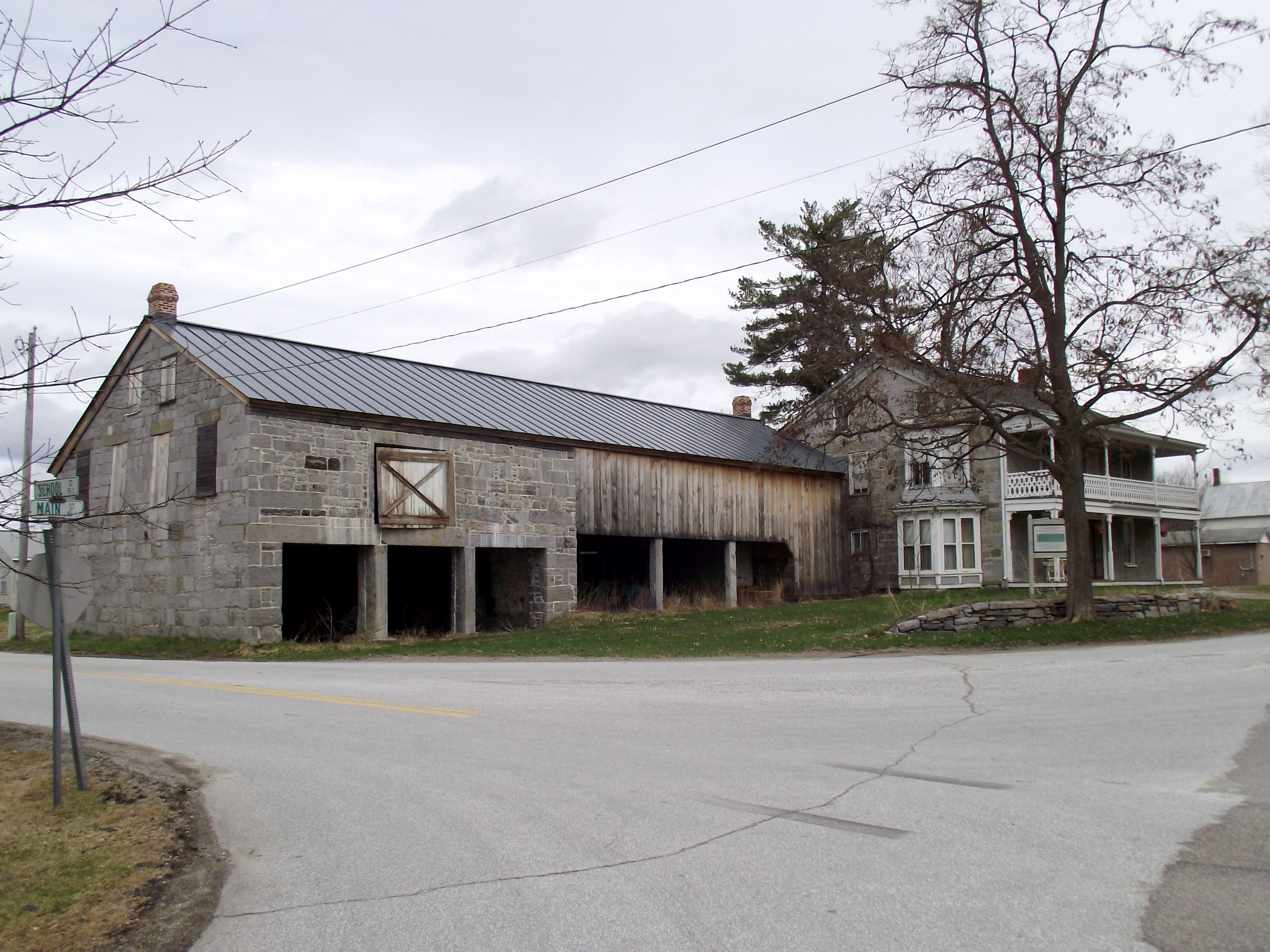

- Location within Vermont Location within the United States
- Location: 2304 Main St., Isle La Motte, Vermont
- Coordinates: 44°52′40″N 73°20′21″W
- Area: 1.3 acres (0.53 ha)
- Built: 1822
- Built by: Ritchie, James
- Architectural style: Greek Revival
- NRHP reference No.: 03001164
- Added to NRHP: November 13, 2003

The Ira Hill House is a historic house at 2304 Main Streets in Isle La Motte, Vermont. Built in 1822 for a prominent local citizen by James Ritchie, a regionally acclaimed stonemason, it is one of the rural community's finer stone houses of the period. It was listed on the National Register of Historic Places in 2003.

== Description and history ==
The Ira Hill House stands in the village center of Isle La Motte, on the west side of Main Street north of its junction with School Street, and just south of the town hall. It consists of a stone main block, 2 1/2 stories in height with a gabled roof, and a long wood-frame and stone ell extending southward from its left. The main block is fashioned out of quarry-cut limestone, some of it exhibiting fossils found in the island community's limestone outcrops. It is fronted by a two-story shed-roof porch, a late 20th-century recreation of an earlier Victorian porch with turned posts and scrolled brackets. The ell has two parts: the outer end is a stone barn whose first floor was built contemporaneously to the house, and whose second floor was added about 1840. The joining section consists of a rear stone wall and a front wood frame wall.

The house was built in 1822 by James Ritchie, a regionally prominent Scottish immigrant stonemason who is credited with building nine buildings in Isle La Motte, including the Methodist Church which stands a short way to the east. Ritchie built the house for Ira Hill, a prominent local businessman and son of one of the island's major landowners. Hill engaged in wide variety of businesses, including the operation of a hotel and tavern on these premises.

== See also ==
- National Register of Historic Places listings in Grand Isle County, Vermont
