= Congregational Church-Grand Isle =

Historic church in Vermont, United States

- U.S. National Register of Historic Places
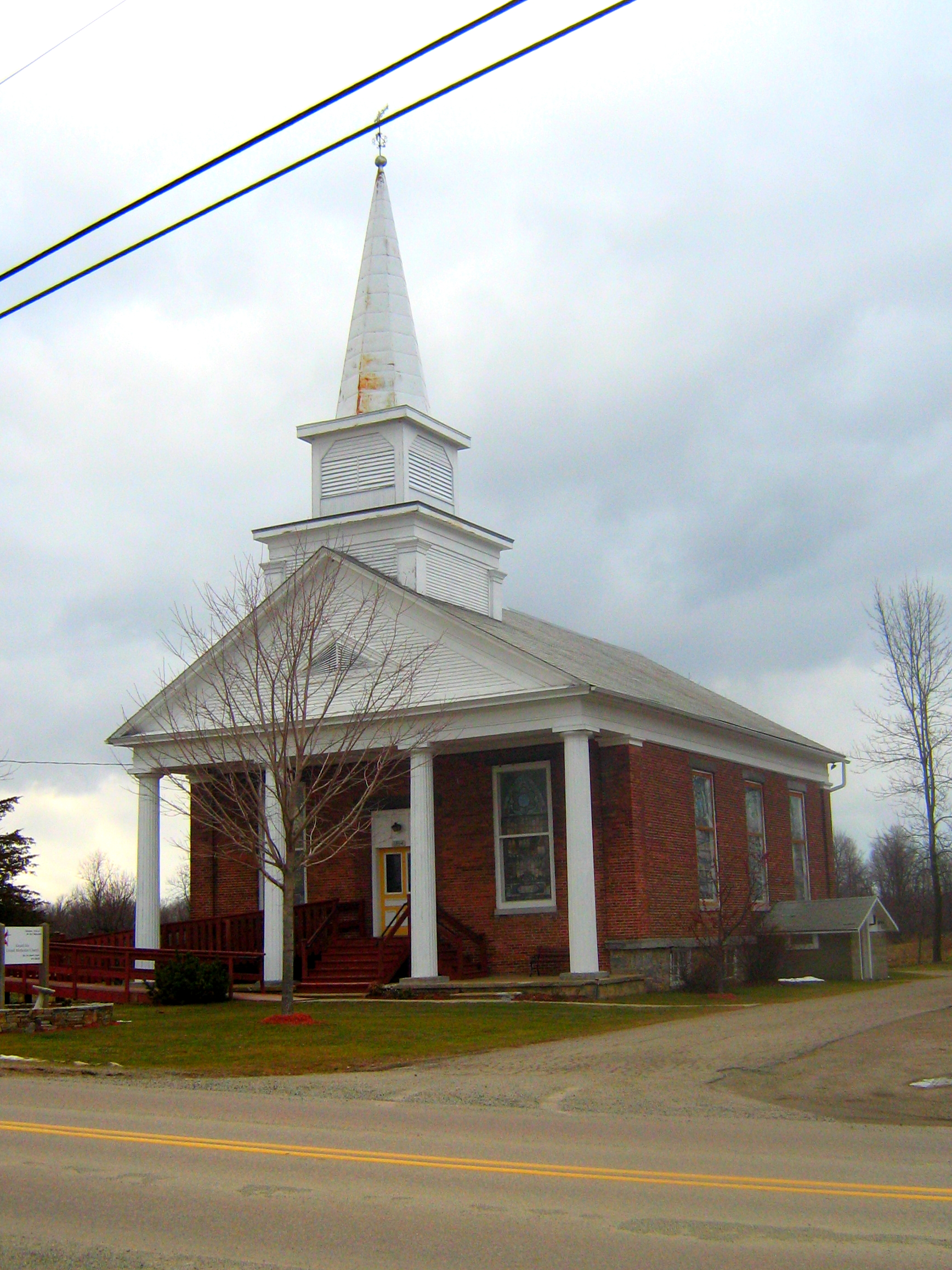

- Location within Vermont Location within the United States
- Location: 12 Hyde Rd., Grand Isle, Vermont
- Coordinates: 44°43′21″N 73°17′46″W
- Area: 0.5 acres (0.20 ha)
- Built: 1853
- Architect: Aschel Hollister, John Chamberlain
- Architectural style: Greek Revival, Gothic Revival
- MPS: Religious Buildings, Sites and Structures in Vermont MPS
- NRHP reference No.: 01000224
- Added to NRHP: March 2, 2001

The Grand Isle United Methodist Church, formerly the Congregational Church—Grand Isle, is a historic church in Grand Isle, Vermont. Built in 1853–54, it is a well-preserved local example of Greek Revival architecture and the town's oldest surviving church building. Originally built for a Congregationalist group, it is now home to a United Methodist Church congregation. The church was listed on the National Register of Historic Places in 2001.

== Description and history ==
The Grand Isle United Methodist Church stands in the village of Grand Isle, on the north side of Hyde Road, about 0.1 miles (0.16 km) west of its junction with United States Route 2. It is a brick structure with a gable roof and a massive projecting Greek Revival portico supported by four fluted Doric columns. The building corners have brick pilasters, and the front gable is finished in wooden clapboards, with a triangular louver at its center. A two-stage wooden bell tower rises from the roof, with a pilastered and corniced first stage, a louvered belfry at the second stage, and an octagonal steeple above. Some of its windows have Gothic arches, and its original wooden pews also have Gothic detailing.

The Congregationalist Society was organized in Grand Isle in 1802 and was soon followed by a competing Methodist organization. The two groups cooperated in the construction of a shared meetinghouse in 1834, with the Congregationalists eventually constructing this building in 1853–54, directly across the street from the other. The Methodist church was sold to the town in 1903 and was demolished in 1975. The two congregations again joined forces in 1919, making this building a union church. With the subsequent demise of the Congregationalist congregation, the church is now used exclusively by the Methodists.

== See also ==
- National Register of Historic Places listings in Grand Isle County, Vermont
