= Gordon-Center House =

Historic house in Vermont, United States

- U.S. National Register of Historic Places
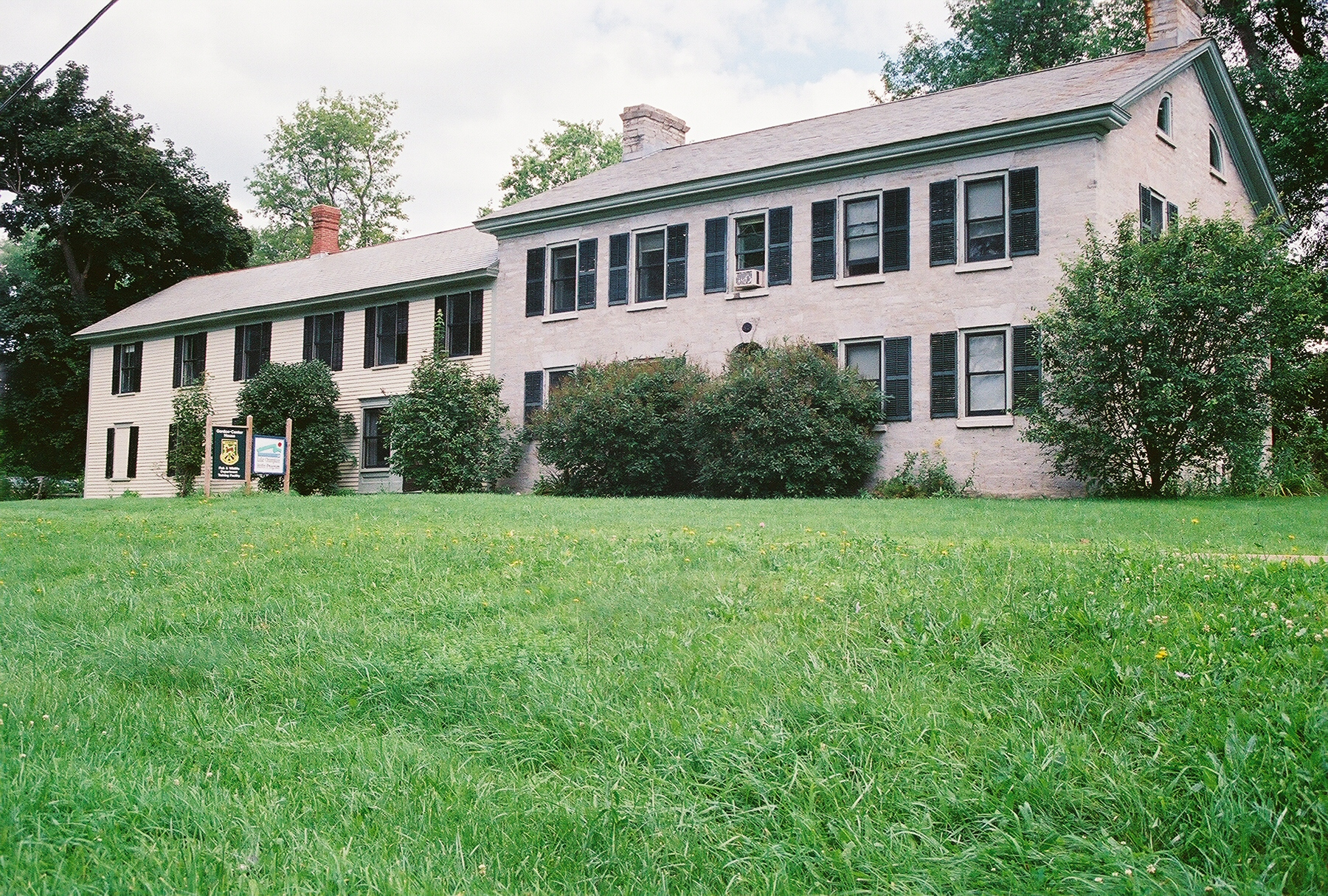

- Location within Vermont Location within the United States
- Location: West Shore Rd., Grand Isle, Vermont
- Coordinates: 44°41′15″N 73°20′15″W
- Area: 9.8 acres (4.0 ha)
- Built: 1824
- Architectural style: Federal
- NRHP reference No.: 86000808
- Added to NRHP: April 17, 1986

The Gordon-Center House is a historic house on West Shore Road (Vermont Route 314) in Grand Isle, Vermont. Probably built in first quarter of the 19th century, it was long been associated with the nearby ferry service to Plattsburgh, New York, and is one of the town's few surviving 19th-century stone buildings. It was listed on the National Register of Historic Places in 1986.

== Description and history ==
The Gordon-Center House stands on the east side of West Shore Road, north of the Gordon's Landing ferry terminus and just south of the Ed Weed Cultural Fish Station. It is a 2 1/2-story stone structure, built out of ashlar granite and coursed rubble, with a side-gable slate roof and two interior chimneys. The entrance is centered on the main facade, and features a distinctive oversized keystone arch. A 2 1/2-story wood-frame wing, dating to early in the building's history, extends to the left. The property also includes five barns, all built before 1930, reflective of the evolutionary changes in the property's agricultural uses.

Apparently completed in 1824, the interior has retained a few Federal style details despite fairly extensive alterations early in the 20th century. The building was long been associated with the ferry service operated, and tradition has it that its construction was begun by Hazen Bell and completed by someone named Boardman. Both were known to be operators of the ferry service, and its subsequent owners were also ferry owners and operators until 1941. The Gordon and Center families were later owners of both the house and ferry privilege in the 19th century.

== See also ==
- National Register of Historic Places listings in Grand Isle County, Vermont
