= J. M. Gordon House =

Historic house in Delaware, US

- U.S. National Register of Historic Places
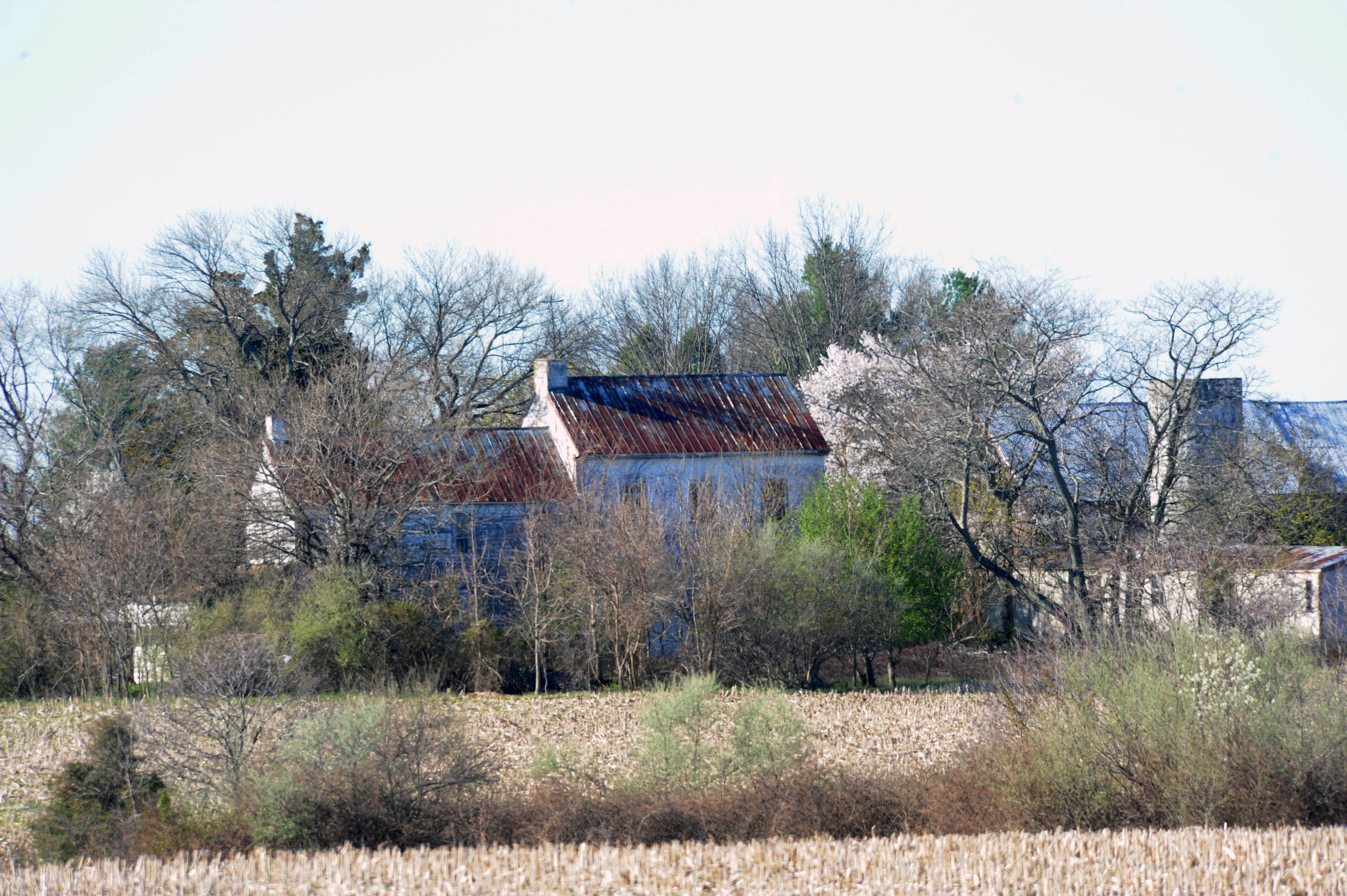

- Location within Delaware Location within the United States
- Location: 910 Vance Neck Rd. in St. Georges Hundred, near Odessa, Delaware
- Coordinates: 39.474171°N 75.624245°W
- Area: 5 acres (2.0 ha)
- Architectural style: Late Victorian, Greek Revival, Federal
- MPS: Rebuilding St. Georges Hundred 1850-1880 TR
- NRHP reference No.: 85002121
- Added to NRHP: September 13, 1985

J. M. Gordon House is a historic home located near Odessa in New Castle County, Delaware, United States. It was built about 1810, and is a 2 1/2-story, three-bay, brick structure with a 2 1/2-half story, four-bay addition.

It was listed on the National Register of Historic Places in 1985.
