= George West Gordon Farm =

Historic house in Pennsylvania, United States

- George W. Gordon Farm
- U.S. National Register of Historic Places
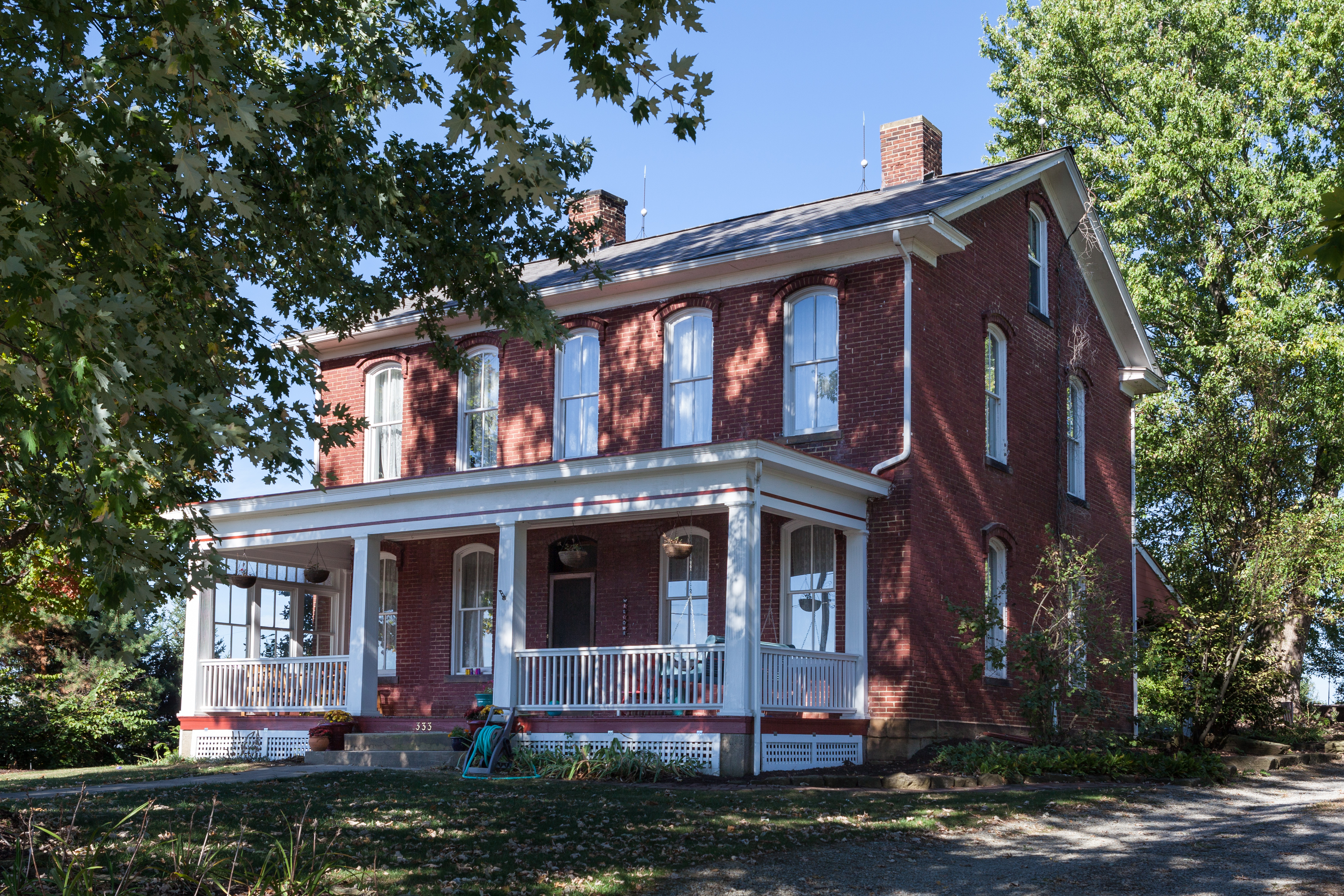
- The farm house in September 2014

- Location within Pennsylvania Location within the United States
- Location: 333 Mary Hoge Rd., 0.3 mi. SW of Gordon Hill, Whiteley Township
- Coordinates: 39°51′21″N 80°9′14″W
- Area: 252 acres (102 ha)
- Built: 1879
- Architectural style: Italianate
- NRHP reference No.: 00000965
- Added to NRHP: August 24, 2000

The George W. Gordon Farm is an historic home and farm which is located in Whiteley Township in Greene County, Pennsylvania.

It was listed on the National Register of Historic Places in 2000.

== History and architectural features ==
Built in 1879, the farmhouse on this historic property is a two-story, five-bay brick dwelling, which was designed in the Italianate style. It features a one-story, three-bay porch, which was added sometime around 1920. Also located on the property are a number of contributing farm outbuildings.
