= York-Gordon House =

Historic house in North Carolina, United States

- U.S. National Register of Historic Places
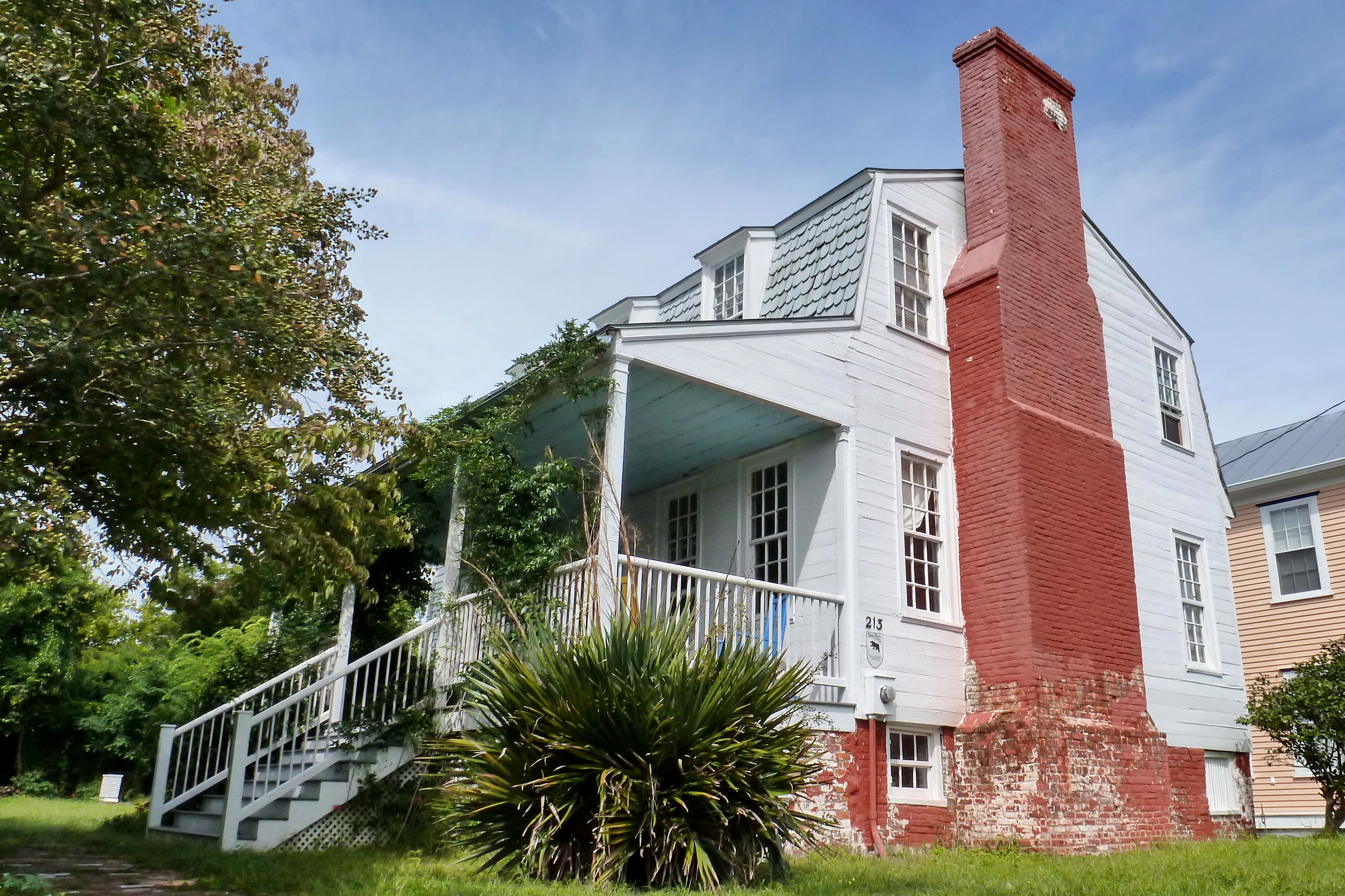
- York-Gordon House, September 2012

- Location within North Carolina Location within the United States
- Location: 213 Hancock St., New Bern, North Carolina
- Coordinates: 35°6′13″N 77°2′37″W
- Area: 0.3 acres (0.12 ha)
- Built: c. 1768
- Architectural style: Georgian, Federal
- NRHP reference No.: 73001328
- Added to NRHP: June 18, 1973

York-Gordon House, more accurately known as the Patrick and Mary Gordon house, is a historic dwelling located at New Bern, Craven County, North Carolina. It was built in 1771, as documented by a letter from Patrick Gordon to William Hooper. Early title research suggested that the house was much older and belonged to Susan York; she evidently lived in an earlier house on this site; her house was probably destroyed in the great storm of 1769. The 1771 house is a 1 1/2-story, five-bay, frame dwelling with a gambrel roof and Georgian style design elements. A Federal chimneypiece replaced an earlier Georgian chimneypiece in the early 19 century. The house is sheathed in shiplap siding over brick-filled walls, rests on a brick over ballast stone foundation and features a full-width, one-story shed-roof porch, which was added 1786, based on estate records.

It was listed on the National Register of Historic Places in 1973.
