= Gordon–Baughan–Warren House =

Historic house in Virginia, United States

- U.S. National Register of Historic Places
- Virginia Landmarks Register
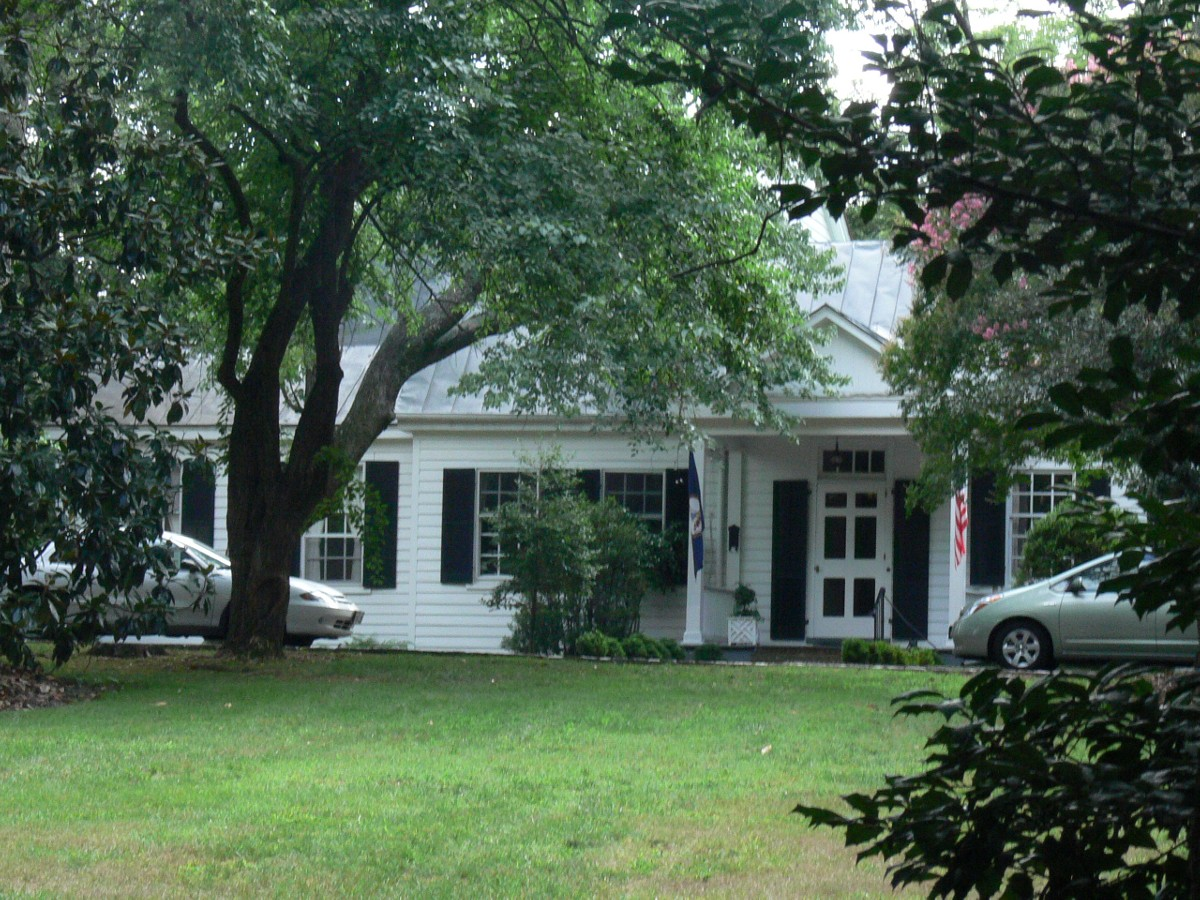
- Gordon–Baughan–Warren House, July 2011

- Location within Virginia Location within the United States
- Location: 6303 Towana Rd., Richmond, Virginia
- Coordinates: 37°34′21″N 77°31′36″W
- Area: 1.7 acres (0.69 ha)
- Built: c. 1835, c. 1860, c. 1910, and c. 1920
- Architectural style: Greek Revival
- NRHP reference No.: 05001621
- VLR No.: 127-6167

Significant dates
- Added to NRHP: February 1, 2006
- Designated VLR: December 7, 2005

Gordon–Baughan–Warren House, also known as Boyd House, is a historic home located in Richmond, Virginia. The original section was built about 1835, and is a 1 1/2-story, Greek Revival style vernacular frame dwelling. It was subsequently enlarged over the years in at least three building campaigns – c. 1860, c. 1910, and c. 1920. The house is seven-bays wide and has an irregular plan. Also on the property are the contributing guesthouse (c. 1860) and a garage (c. 1860, c. 1910).

It was listed on the National Register of Historic Places in 2006.
