= Troy Gordon House =

- U.S. National Register of Historic Places
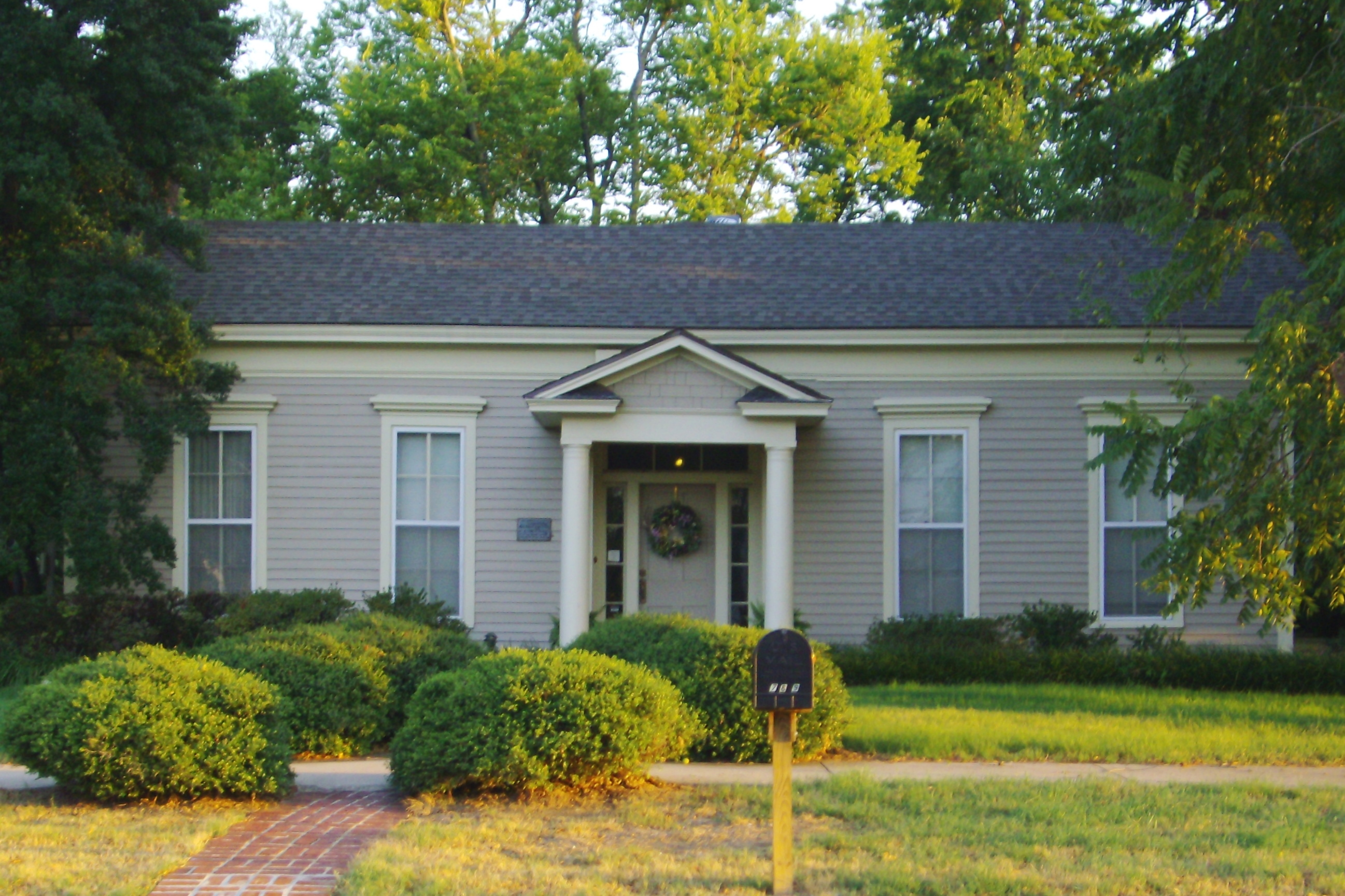
- Troy Gordon House, 2011

- Location within Arkansas Location within the United States
- Location: 9 W. Township Rd., Fayetteville, Arkansas
- Coordinates: 36°5′40″N 94°10′11″W
- Area: less than one acre
- Built: 1851
- Architectural style: Greek Revival
- NRHP reference No.: 78000635
- Added to NRHP: December 1, 1978

The Troy Gordon House (formerly known as the Old Anderson Farm) is a historic house at 9 E. Township Road in Fayetteville, Arkansas. It is a modest single-story wood-frame structure, five bays wide, with a side gable roof and a stone foundation. The main entrance, centered on the symmetrical facade, is sheltered by a Doric gable-roofed portico whose columns are original to the house's 1851 construction. The house is one of the few remaining antebellum houses in Arkansas.

The house was listed on the National Register of Historic Places in 1978.

== See also ==
- National Register of Historic Places listings in Washington County, Arkansas
