= Twentythree, Arkansas =

Unincorporated community in Arkansas, US

Coordinates: 35°22′34″N 91°33′34″W

Twentythree is an unincorporated community in White County, Arkansas, United States.
