= South Hero, Vermont =

- Town
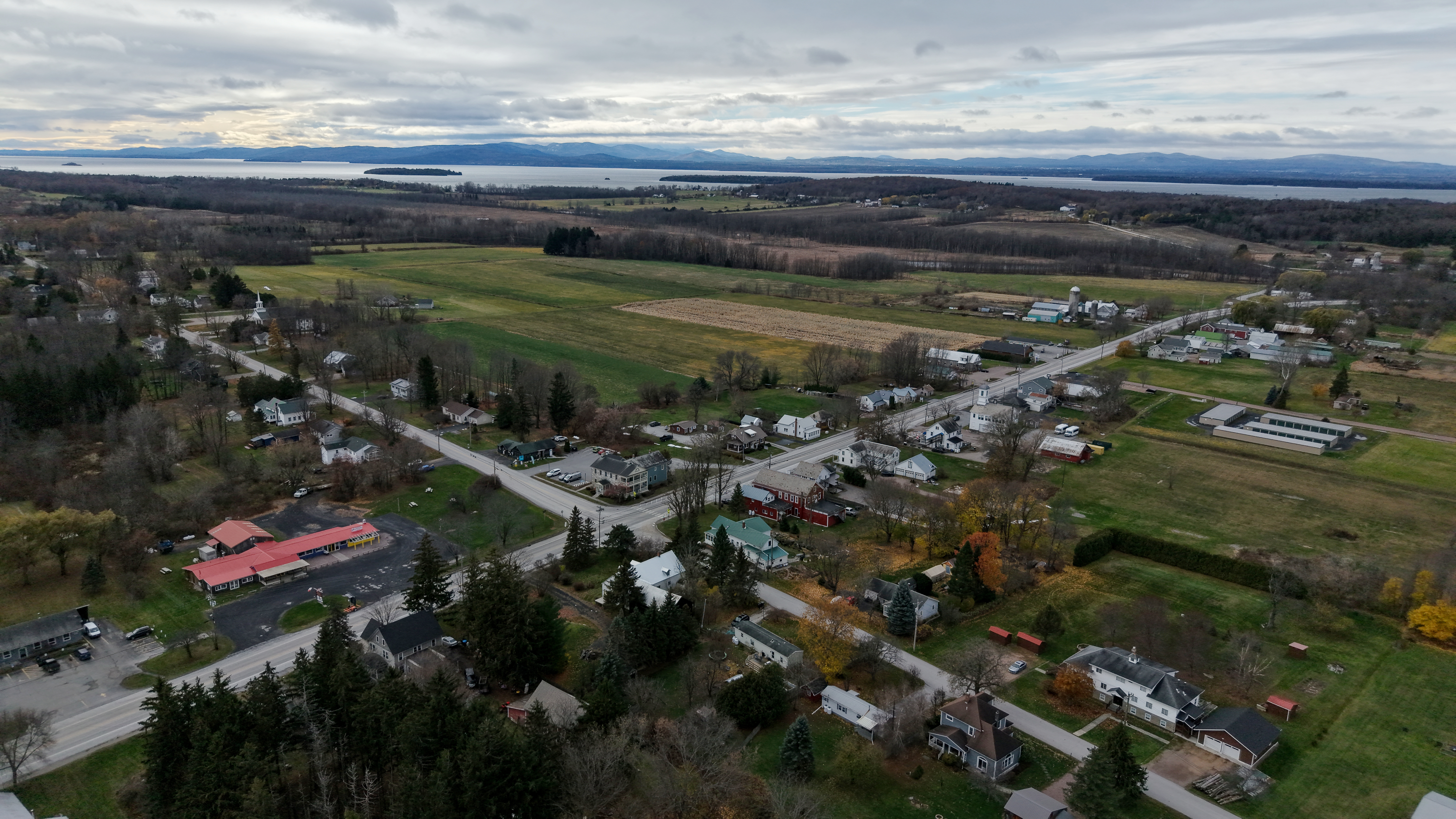
- South Hero, VT, from the northeast

- Location in Grand Isle County and the state of Vermont
- Coordinates: 44°38′15″N 73°18′36″W
- Country: United States
- State: Vermont
- County: Grand Isle
- Communities: South Hero; Keeler Bay

Area
  - Total: 47.5 sq mi (123.0 km^{2})
  - Land: 14.9 sq mi (38.6 km^{2})
  - Water: 32.6 sq mi (84.4 km^{2})
- Elevation: 98 ft (30 m)

Population (2020)
  - Total: 1,674
  - Density: 112/sq mi (43.4/km^{2})
- Time zone: UTC−5 (Eastern (EST))
  - Summer (DST): UTC−4 (EDT)
- ZIP Code: 05486
- Area code: 802
- FIPS code: 50-67000
- GNIS feature ID: 1462213
- Website: www.southherovt.org

South Hero is a town on Grand Isle in Grand Isle County, Vermont, United States. South Hero's population was 1,674 at the 2020 census.

== Geography ==
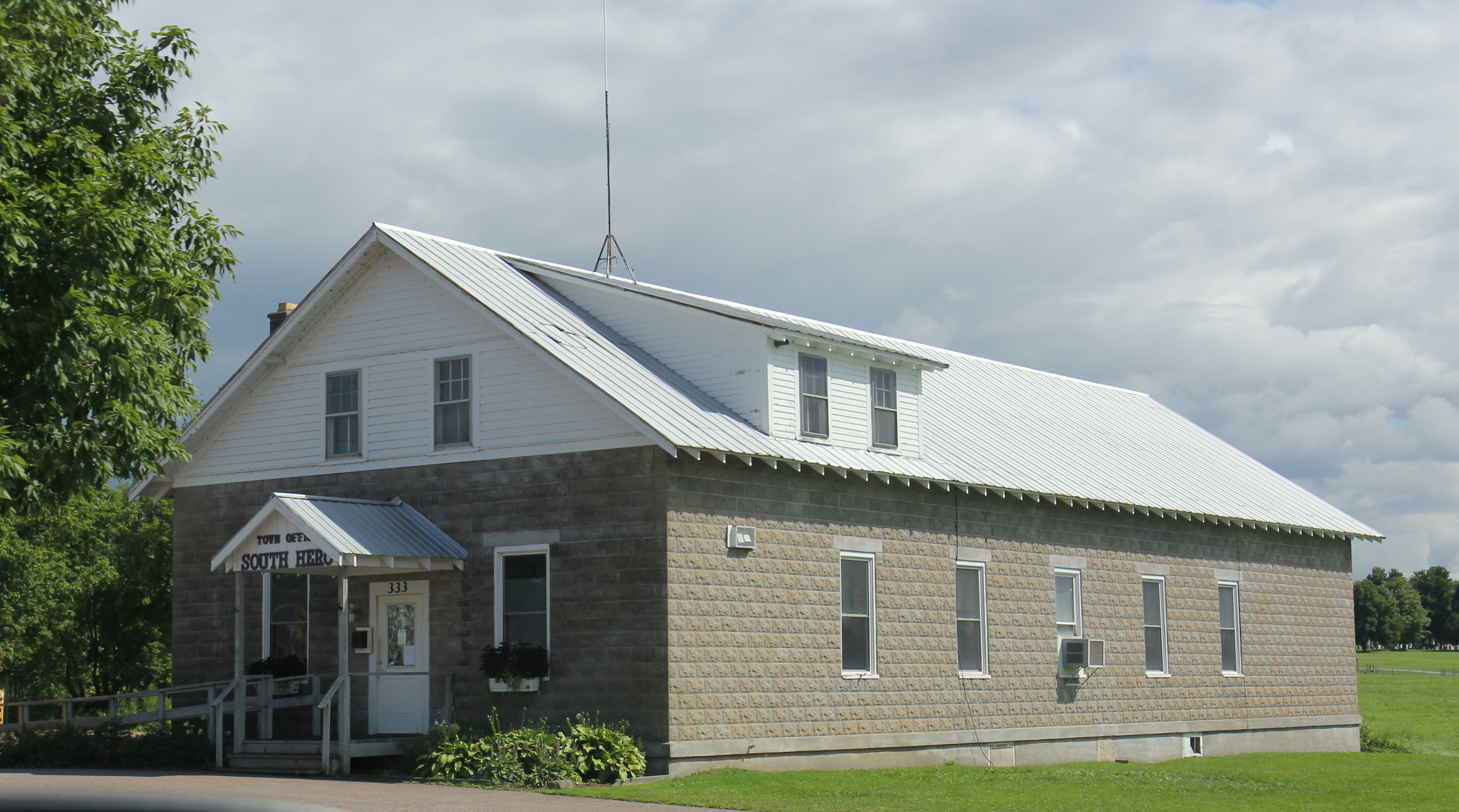
The town hall for South Hero

The town of South Hero includes the southern half of South Hero Island (also known as Grand Isle), as well as several smaller islands in Lake Champlain, including Providence Island and Stave Island to the southwest. To the west, across Lake Champlain, it is bordered by the towns of Plattsburgh and Peru in Clinton County, New York. To the east, across the eastern arm of Lake Champlain, is the town of Milton in Chittenden County, and to the south across the lake is the town of Colchester, also in Chittenden County, to which it is connected via the Island Line Trail (with a 200 foot gap that is serviced by a small ferry).

U.S. Route 2 crosses the town, leaving north into the town of Grand Isle and to the east, across Lake Champlain over sandbar bridge, into a corner of the town of Milton. Burlington, the largest city in Vermont, is 19 miles (31 km) to the south by road, and Rouses Point, New York, is 31 miles (50 km) to the north. The unincorporated village of South Hero is in the center of the town, along US-2.

According to the United States Census Bureau, the town of South Hero has a total area of 47.5 square miles (123.0 km^{2}), of which 14.9 square miles (38.6 km^{2}) are land and 32.6 square miles (84.4 km^{2}), or 68.59%, are water.

=== Climate ===
This climatic region is typified by large seasonal temperature differences, with warm to hot (and often humid) summers and cold (sometimes severely cold) winters. According to the Köppen Climate Classification system, South Hero has a humid continental climate, abbreviated "Dfb" on climate maps.

Climate data for South Hero, Vermont (1991–2020 normals, extremes 1969–present)
Month	Jan	Feb	Mar	Apr	May	Jun	Jul	Aug	Sep	Oct	Nov	Dec	Year
Record high °F (°C)	61 (16)	62 (17)	81 (27)	88 (31)	94 (34)	98 (37)	98 (37)	99 (37)	97 (36)	83 (28)	71 (22)	66 (19)	99 (37)
Mean daily maximum °F (°C)	27.8 (−2.3)	30.7 (−0.7)	40.1 (4.5)	53.8 (12.1)	67.9 (19.9)	76.8 (24.9)	81.5 (27.5)	79.9 (26.6)	72.2 (22.3)	58.0 (14.4)	45.6 (7.6)	34.0 (1.1)	55.7 (13.2)
Daily mean °F (°C)	19.6 (−6.9)	21.6 (−5.8)	30.9 (−0.6)	43.9 (6.6)	57.1 (13.9)	66.3 (19.1)	71.7 (22.1)	70.3 (21.3)	62.7 (17.1)	50.1 (10.1)	38.5 (3.6)	27.3 (−2.6)	46.7 (8.2)
Mean daily minimum °F (°C)	11.3 (−11.5)	12.4 (−10.9)	21.7 (−5.7)	34.1 (1.2)	46.4 (8.0)	55.9 (13.3)	61.9 (16.6)	60.8 (16.0)	53.1 (11.7)	42.1 (5.6)	31.4 (−0.3)	20.5 (−6.4)	37.6 (3.1)
Record low °F (°C)	−31 (−35)	−27 (−33)	−16 (−27)	8 (−13)	26 (−3)	34 (1)	37 (3)	41 (5)	29 (−2)	21 (−6)	3 (−16)	−22 (−30)	−31 (−35)
Average precipitation inches (mm)	1.94 (49)	1.57 (40)	2.02 (51)	2.66 (68)	3.36 (85)	4.09 (104)	3.85 (98)	3.62 (92)	3.26 (83)	3.74 (95)	2.67 (68)	2.21 (56)	34.99 (889)
Average snowfall inches (cm)	11.4 (29)	11.6 (29)	10.6 (27)	2.2 (5.6)	0.0 (0.0)	0.0 (0.0)	0.0 (0.0)	0.0 (0.0)	0.0 (0.0)	0.1 (0.25)	3.3 (8.4)	10.9 (28)	50.1 (127)
Average precipitation days (≥ 0.01 in)	10.6	8.4	9.5	11.0	11.6	12.2	11.6	10.6	9.6	11.3	10.1	10.9	127.4
Average snowy days (≥ 0.1 in)	8.6	6.7	5.6	1.8	0.0	0.0	0.0	0.0	0.0	0.1	2.1	7.3	32.2
Source: NOAA

== Demographics ==
Historical population
Census	Pop.	Note	%±
1790	537		—
1800	611		13.8%
1810	826		35.2%
1820	842		1.9%
1830	717		−14.8%
1840	664		−7.4%
1850	705		6.2%
1860	617		−12.5%
1870	586		−5.0%
1880	620		5.8%
1890	559		−9.8%
1900	917		64.0%
1910	605		−34.0%
1920	606		0.2%
1930	641		5.8%
1940	611		−4.7%
1950	567		−7.2%
1960	614		8.3%
1970	868		41.4%
1980	1,188		36.9%
1990	1,404		18.2%
2000	1,696		20.8%
2010	1,631		−3.8%
2020	1,674		2.6%
U.S. Decennial Census

As of the census of 2000, there were 1,696 people, 663 households, and 472 families residing in the town. The population density was 112.3 people per square mile (43.4/km^{2}). There were 1,036 housing units at an average density of 68.6 per square mile (26.5/km^{2}). The racial makeup of the town was 97.94% White, 0.24% African American, 0.47% Native American, 0.29% Asian, 0.12% from other races, and 0.94% from two or more races. Hispanic or Latino of any race were 0.53% of the population.

There were 663 households, out of which 32.6% had children under the age of 18 living with them, 61.7% were married couples living together, 6.0% had a female householder with no husband present, and 28.7% were non-families. Of all households, 21.0% were made up of individuals, and 7.1% had someone living alone who was 65 years of age or older. The average household size was 2.56 and the average family size was 2.98.

In the town, the population was spread out, with 24.9% under the age of 18, 5.5% from 18 to 24, 28.8% from 25 to 44, 29.5% from 45 to 64, and 11.1% who were 65 years of age or older. The median age was 40 years. For every 100 females, there were 98.1 males. For every 100 females age 18 and over, there were 95.8 males.

The median income for a household in the town was $52,344, and the median income for a family was $61,198. Males had a median income of $41,250 versus $27,357 for females. The per capita income for the town was $26,532. About 4.0% of families and 4.5% of the population were below the poverty line, including 3.8% of those under age 18 and 5.2% of those age 65 or over.

Though it has relatively few full-time residents, South Hero is much more populated in the summer months with seasonal residents and out-of-town vacationers and tourists usually from Canada.

== Culture ==
South Hero has a strong agricultural system that combines multi-generational farming operations with newer sustainable and organic ventures. Apples and dairy continue to be mainstay industries with multiple orchards and dairy farms throughout the town.

The local K–8 school (Folsom Elementary) also houses the town's community center and is a focal point for many events, from library-based learning and programs to school-sponsored plays and athletic events. The town also hosts an annual marathon and half-marathon, which begins and ends in front of the school.

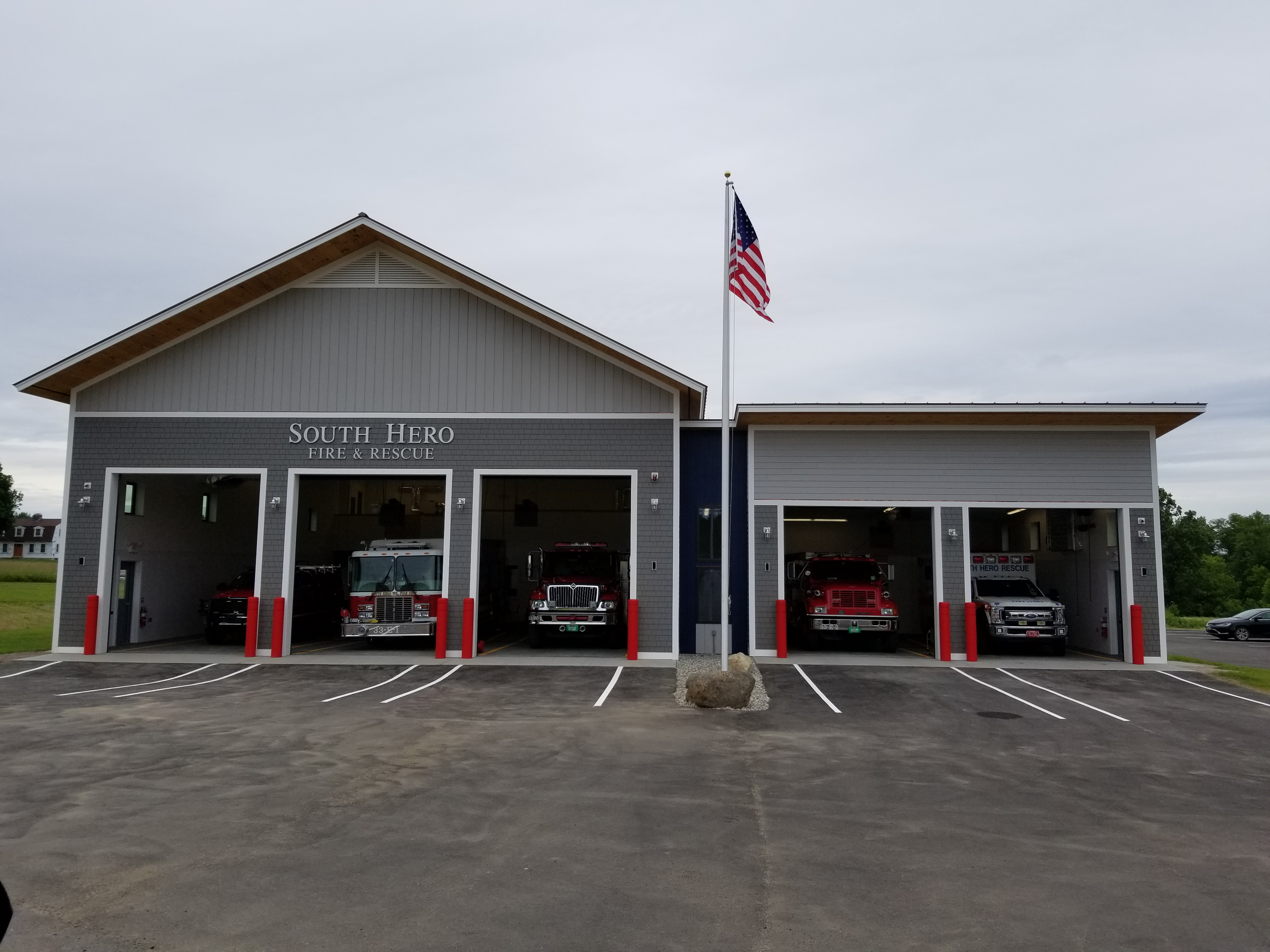
South Hero Volunteer Fire Department

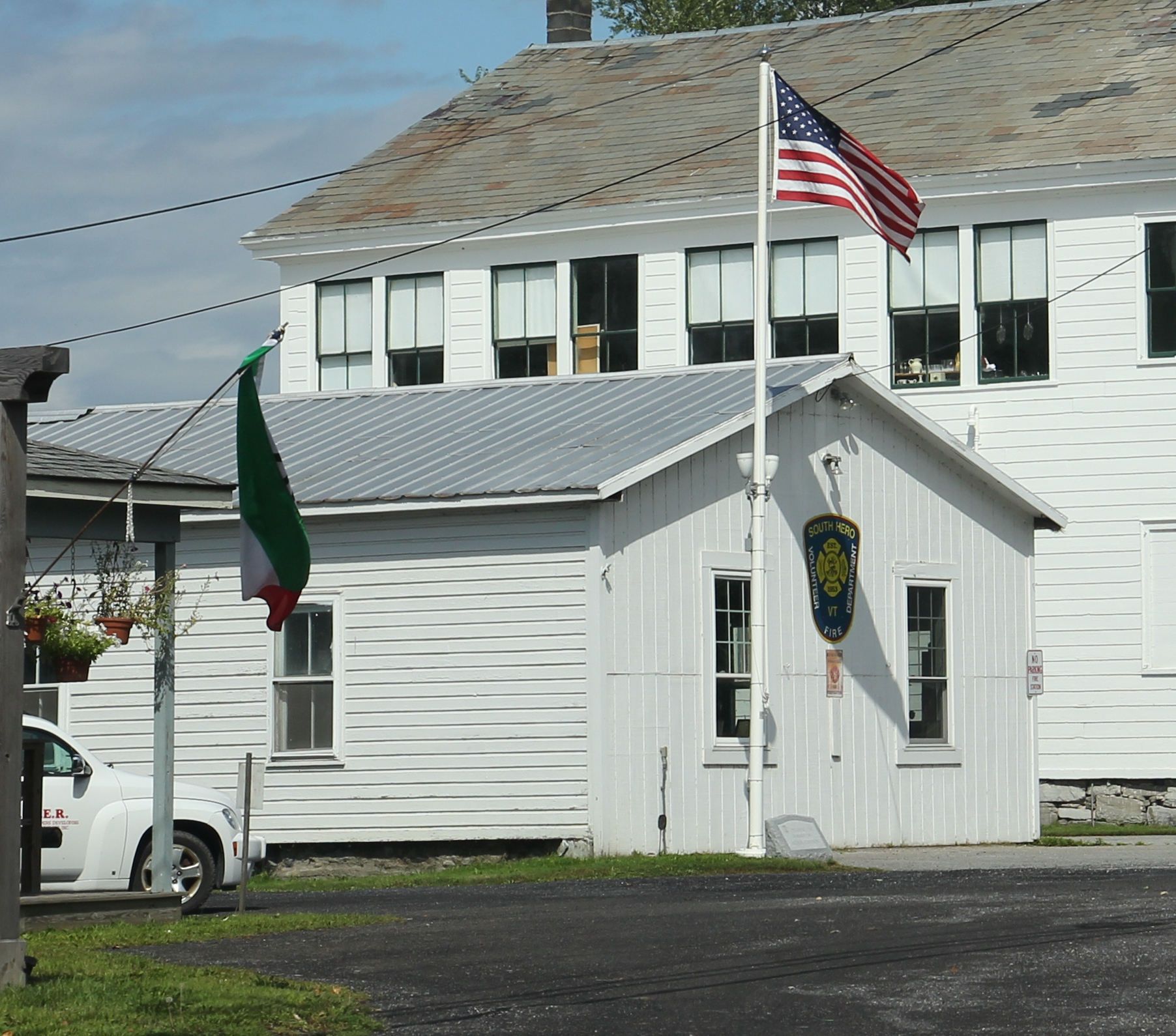
South Hero Volunteer Fire Department

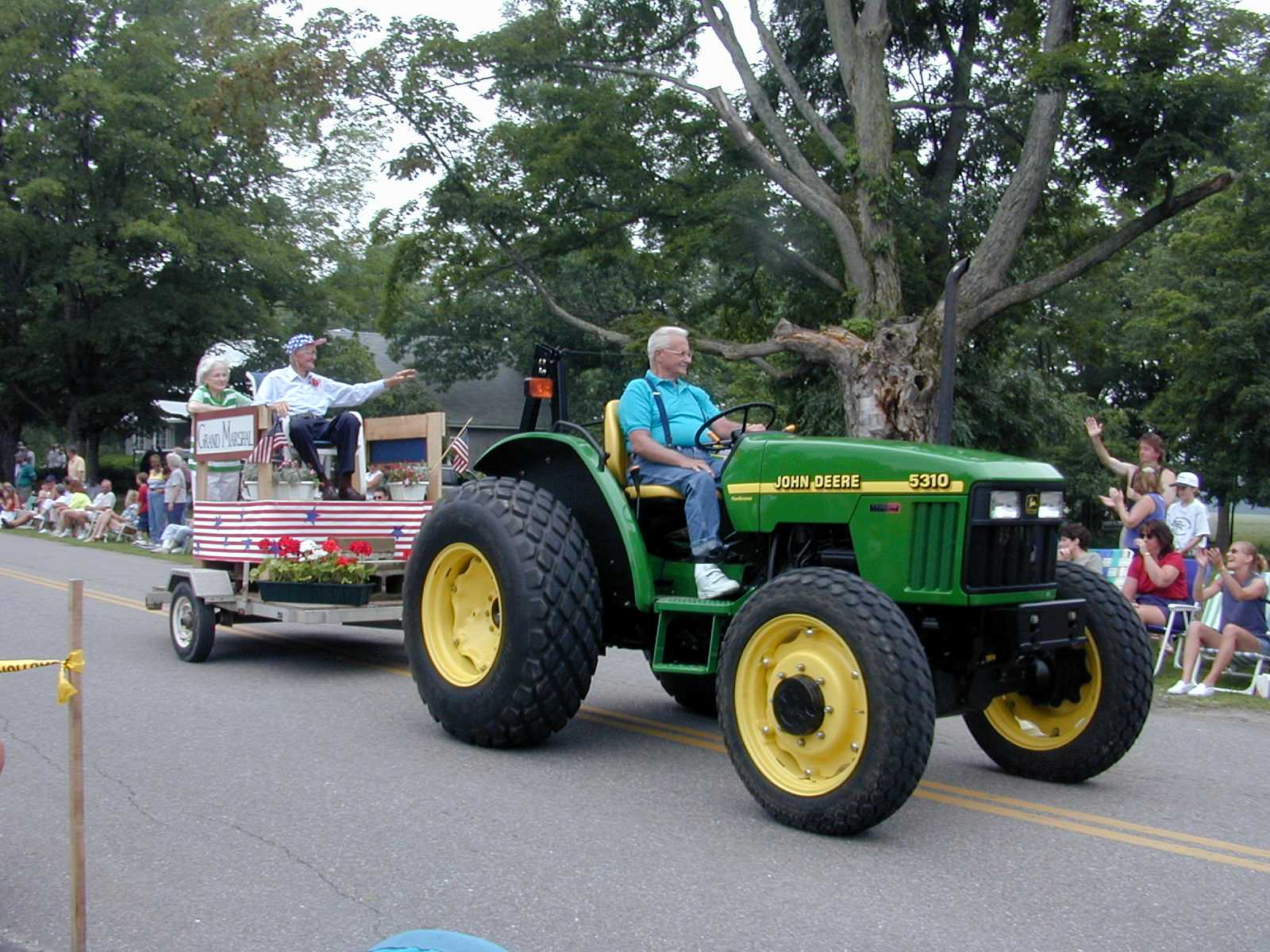
The Parade Grand Marshal kicks off the 2000 edition of the annual South Hero Fourth of July parade. South Hero hosts the parade for all of Grand Isle County, Vermont.

== Notable people ==
- Jewett W. Adams, fourth governor of Nevada; born in South Hero
- Craig Alanson, New York Times bestselling author
- Ebenezer Allen, owner of the first settlement at South Hero
- Asa Lyon, U.S. Representative
- Sarah M. Dawson Merrill, educator
- Barbara West, former ABC TV network journalist, and former Miss Vermont
