= Battle of Sorel =

Battle during the Beaver Wars

Coordinates: 46°02′N 73°07′W

- Part of the Beaver Wars
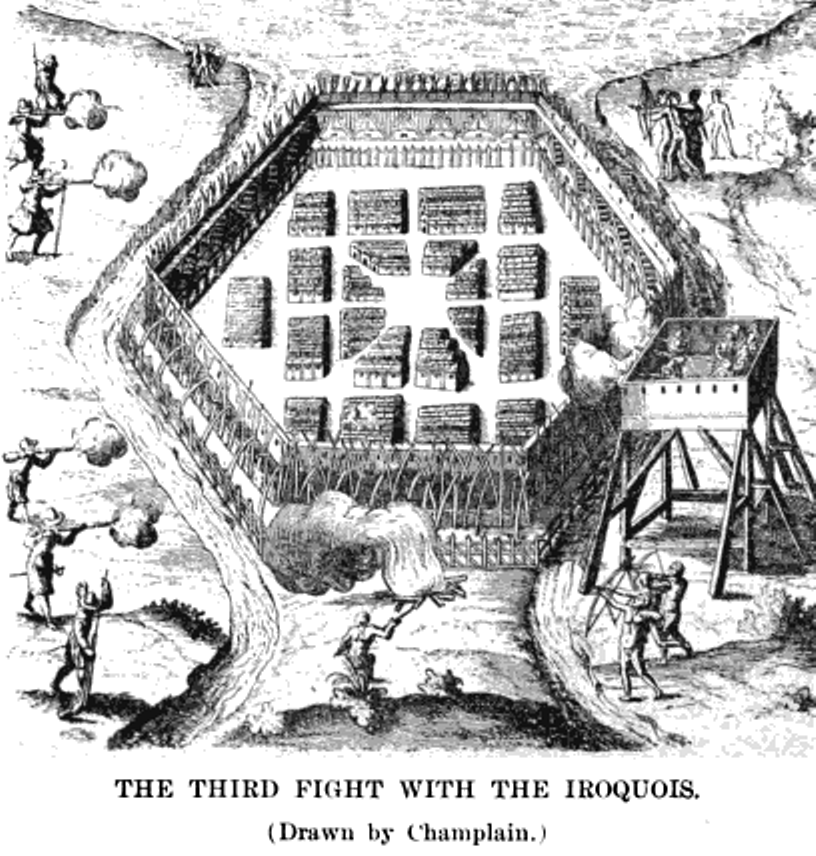
Date	June 19, 1610
Location	near the present-day city of Sorel-Tracy, Quebec, Richelieu River, New France
Result	French and allied victory

Belligerents
France; Wendat; Algonquin; Innu	Haudenosaunee

Commanders and leaders
Samuel de Champlain	Unknown

Strength
~300 warriors 5 arquebusiers	~100 warriors 1 fort

Casualties and losses
Between 15 and 20 killed 50 wounded	100 killed 15 captured and later tortured to death 1 fort captured
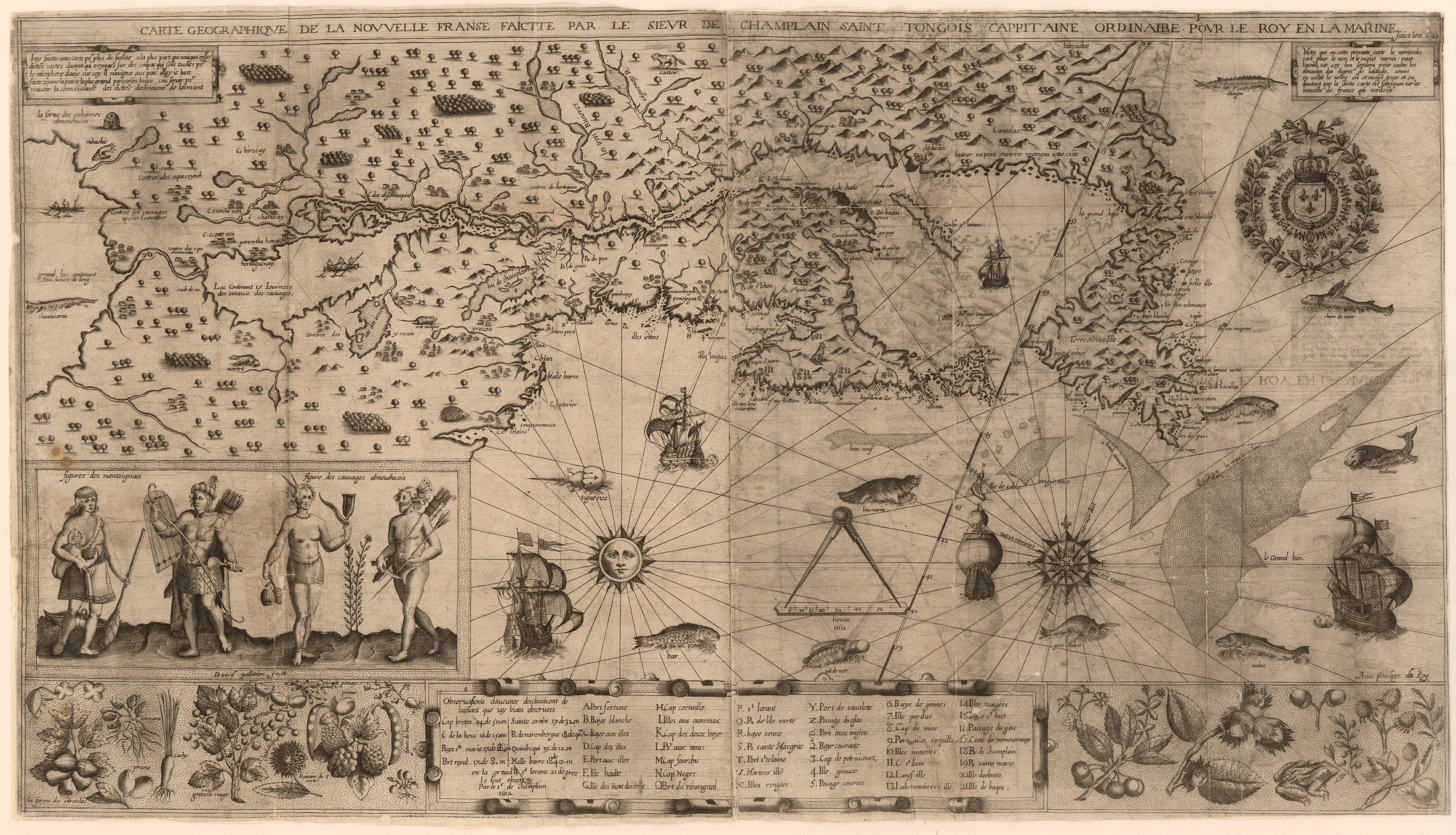
- Map of New France, by Samuel de Champlain, circa 1612

The Battle of Sorel occurred on June 19, 1610, with Samuel de Champlain supported by the Kingdom of France and his allies, the Wendat (Huron), Algonquin people, and Innu (Montagnais) that fought against the Mohawk people in New France at present-day Sorel-Tracy, Quebec. The forces of Champlain armed with the arquebus engaged and killed or captured nearly all of the Mohawks. The battle ended major hostilities with the Mohawks for twenty years.

The Battle of Sorel was part of the Beaver Wars, which pitted the nations of the Haudenosaunee Confederation (Iroquois), led by the dominant Mohawks, against the Algonquian peoples of the Great Lakes region, supported by the Kingdom of France. The Beaver Wars continued intermittently for nearly a century, ending with the Great Peace of Montreal in 1701.

== Conflicts ==
Before 1603, Champlain had formed an offensive alliance against the Haudenosaunee, and a precedent was set that the French would not trade firearms to the Haudenosaunee. He had a commercial rationale: the northern Natives provided the French with valuable furs and the Haudenosaunee, based in present-day New York State, interfered with that trade.

The transition from a seasonal coastal trade into a permanent interior fur trade was formally marked with the foundation of Quebec City on the St. Lawrence River in 1608 by Samuel de Champlain. This settlement marked the beginning of the westward movement of French traders from the first permanent settlement of Tadoussac at the mouth of the Saguenay River on the Gulf of St. Lawrence, up the St. Lawrence River and into the Pays d'en Haut around the Great Lakes. What followed in the first half of the 17th century were strategic moves by both the French and the indigenous groups to further their own economic and geopolitical ambitions.

The first deliberate battle in 1609 was fought at Champlain's initiative. Champlain deliberately went along with a war party down Lake Champlain. Furthermore, this battle created 150 years of mistrust that poisoned any chances that French-Iroquois alliances would be durable and long lived. De Champlain wrote, "I had come with no other intention than to make war". In the company of his Wendat and Algonkin allies, Champlain and his forces fought a pitched battle with the Mohawk on the shores of Lake Champlain. Champlain singlehandedly killed three Haudenosaunee chiefs with an arquebus despite the war chiefs having worn "arrowproof body armor made of plaited sticks".

== Aftermath ==
During the 17th-century, the French established a military force in New France which consisted of a mix of French army regulars, French naval personnel, and Canadien volunteer militia units. The French built many forts in North America, including Fort Richelieu, established at the mouth of the Richelieu River, near Sorel, in 1641. The fort was built by Charles Huault de Montmagny, the first Governor and Lieutenant-Governor of New France and named in honour of Cardinal Richelieu, chief minister to King Louis XIII. Fort Richelieu was burned by the Haudosaunee in 1647 then rebuilt in 1665 by the Carignan-Salières Regiment, under the direction of Pierre de Saurel.

== See also ==
- Colonial militia in Canada
- French colonization of the Americas
- Military history of Canada
