= Pierre-De Saurel Regional County Municipality =

Pierre-De Saurel
- Regional county municipality
- Location in province of Quebec.
- Coordinates: 45°58′N 73°00′W
- Country: Canada
- Province: Quebec
- Region: Montérégie
- Effective: January 1, 1982
- Named for: Pierre de Saurel
- County seat: Sorel-Tracy

Government
  - Type: Prefecture
  - Prefect: Gilles Salvas

Area
  - Total: 639.00 km^{2} (246.72 sq mi)
  - Land: 597.55 km^{2} (230.72 sq mi)

Population (2016)
  - Total: 51,025
  - Density: 85.4/km^{2} (221/sq mi)
  - Change 2011-2016: ▲0.2%
  - Dwellings: 25,425
- Time zone: UTC−5 (EST)
  - Summer (DST): UTC−4 (EDT)
- Area codes: 450 and 579
- Website: www.mrcpierredesaurel.com

Pierre-De Saurel (French pronunciation: [pjɛʁ də soʁɛl]) is a regional county municipality in the Montérégie region in southwestern Quebec, Canada. Originally named Le Bas-Richelieu Regional County Municipality, the name change to Pierre-De Saurel took effect on January 1, 2009. Its seat is in Sorel-Tracy. It is located on the Richelieu River, downstream from La Vallée-du-Richelieu Regional County Municipality at the confluence of the Richelieu and Saint Lawrence River.

The RCM is named after Pierre de Saurel, a captain of the Carignan-Salières Regiment who rebuilt Fort Richelieu in 1666 and later became the area's seigneur.

== Subdivisions ==
There are 12 subdivisions within the RCM:

Cities & Towns (3)

- Saint-Joseph-de-Sorel
- Saint-Ours
- Sorel-Tracy

Municipalities (7)

- Saint-Aimé
- Saint-David
- Saint-Robert
- Saint-Roch-de-Richelieu
- Sainte-Anne-de-Sorel
- Sainte-Victoire-de-Sorel
- Yamaska

Parishes (1)

- Saint-Gérard-Majella

Villages (1)

- Massueville

== Demographics ==
=== Population ===
Canada census – Pierre-De Saurel community profile

	2021	2016	2011
Population	51,843 (+1.6% from 2016)	51,025 (+0.2% from 2011)	50,900 (+1.9% from 2006)
Land area	595.13 km^{2} (229.78 sq mi)	597.55 km^{2} (230.72 sq mi)	598.13 km^{2} (230.94 sq mi)
Population density	87.1/km^{2} (226/sq mi)	85.4/km^{2} (221/sq mi)	85.1/km^{2} (220/sq mi)
Median age	51.6 (M: 50, F: 53.2)	51.0 (M: 49.5, F: 52.3)	49.0 (M: 48.1, F: 50.0)
Private dwellings	24,725 (total)	25,425 (total)	24,648 (total)
Median household income		$52,922	$46,235

References: 2021 2016 2011

Historical Census Data - Pierre-De Saurel Regional County Municipality, Quebec

Year	Pop.	±%
1991	53,909	—
1996	52,289	−3.0%

Year	Pop.	±%
2001	50,066	−4.3%
2006	49,932	−0.3%

Year	Pop.	±%
2011	50,900	+1.9%
2016	51,025	+0.2%

=== Language ===
Canada Census Mother Tongue - Pierre-De Saurel Regional County Municipality, Quebec
Census	Total	French			English			French & English			Other		
Year	Responses	Count	Trend	Pop %	Count	Trend	Pop %	Count	Trend	Pop %	Count	Trend	Pop %
2016	50,390	49,035	▼0.17%	97.1%	485	▼1.0%	1.0%	225	▲7.1%	0.4%	730	▲57.0%	1.4%
2011	50,200	48,950	▲2.9%	97.68%	490	▲21.0%	0.98%	210	▲27.3%	0.42%	465	▼25.6%	0.93%
2006	48,855	47,660	▼1.3%	97.55%	405	0.0%	0.83%	165	▼2.9%	0.34%	625	▲83.8%	1.28%
2001	49,205	48,290	▼4.5%	98.14%	405	▲24.6%	0.82%	170	▼2.9%	0.35%	340	▼13.9%	0.69%
1996	51,480	50,585	n/a	98.26%	325	n/a	0.63%	175	n/a	0.34%	395	n/a	0.77%

== Transportation ==
=== Access routes ===
Highways and numbered routes that run through the municipality, including external routes that start or finish at the county border:

- Autoroutes
  - A-30
- Principal highways
  - R-122
  - R-132
  - R-133
- Secondary highways
  - R-223
  - R-235
  - R-239
- External routes
  - None

== See also ==
- List of regional county municipalities and equivalent territories in Quebec
