= Alexandre Berthier =

French military officer and seigneur in New France

- Born: 1638
- Died: 1708 (aged 69–70)
- Military career
- Allegiance: Kingdom of France
- Branch: Army
- Rank: Captain
- Unit: Allier Regiment

Alexandre Berthier (French pronunciation: [alɛksɑ̃dʁ bɛʁtje]; 1638–1708) was a captain in the Allier Regiment of the French Royal Army and later a seigneur in New France. Born into a Huguenot family, he was named Issac at birth but adopted the name Alexandre after converting to Roman Catholicism in 1665. He served under Alexandre de Prouville de Tracy during the capture of Cayenne (a former French colony in Guiana) in May 1664, deployed with Tracy to New France in 1665, and was part of a major expedition against the Mohawk in the fall of 1666.

== Military career ==
Berthier, the son of Pierre Berthier and Marguerite Bariac, was born in Bergerac, France in 1638. He was commissioned as an officer in the Allier Regiment and rose to the rank of captain. In a letter to his father dated November 13, 1657, he describes being seriously wounded at Alessandria during the Franco-Spanish War. In 1663, his company was selected as one of four companies from different regiments that would accompany the recently appointed Lieutenant Général of the Americas, Alexandre de Prouville de Tracy, to the West Indies and then to New France.

The expedition sailed from La Rochelle in February 1664. Cayenne was captured from the Dutch without opposition in May 1664. After wintering in Guadeloupe, Tracy, Berthier and the soldiers that had accompanied them left the West Indies for the Gulf of St. Lawrence aboard the Brèse. They transferred to smaller ships at Percé and disembarked at Quebec on June 30, 1665. 11 days earlier, the first four companies of the Carignan-Salières Regiment had arrived from France. By mid-September the remaining 16 companies of the regiment had arrived. For the next three years, roughly 1,200 French soldiers protected New France from Iroquois raids.

Although the Edict of Nantes in 1598 granted the minority Huguenots in France substantial rights, they were not permitted to settle in New France. When Bishop François de Laval discovered that there were significant numbers of Huguenots within the ranks of the French soldiers, corrective measures were taken. The Huguenots were coerced into publicly abjuring their faith. Since he was an officer who had been commissioned by the king, Berthier abjured in a private ceremony on October 7, 1665, conducted by Laval and witnessed by Tracy. He appears to have adopted the name Alexandre at this time.

In 1666, Berthier was tasked with the construction of Fort de l'Assumption on the Richelieu River, and served as its commanding officer. The fort, located in present-day Saint-Marc-sur-Richelieu, was one of several that Tracy ordered built astride the route that the Iroquois used to attack settlements on the St. Lawrence River.

Later that year, Berthier and Chambly co-commanded the rear guard during Tracy's large-scale expedition against the Mohawk, one of the five Iroquois nations. The expedition razed four villages which the Mohawk had hastily abandoned, and destroyed their winter stores of food. A peace settlement with the Mohawk was reached the following year.

Bertier returned to France in 1668, however, 18 of his men elected to remain as settlers. In the late summer of 1669 Bertier volunteered to return to New France as captain of a company of the Troupes de la Marine.

== Seigneur in New France ==
In 1672, Berthier married Marie Legardeur de Tilly, daughter of Charles Legardeur de Tilly. That same year. Jean Talon, Intendant of New France, granted Berthier a seigneury created from the former Bellechase seigneury. The seigneury, located east of Quebec on the south side of the St. Lawrence River, was named Berthier-d'en-Bas but is now known as Berthier-sur-Mer. In 1673, he purchased from Hugues Randin a seigneury on the north side of the St. Lawrence River west of Trois Riveres. He named this seigneury Berthier-d'en-Haut.

Berthier commanded a company of Canadian militia during the Marquis de Denonville's expedition against the Seneca in 1789 that destroyed four of their villages.

Berthier died in December 1708 at Berthier-d'en-Bas. His wife and three children predeceased him. In his will he bequeathed his possessions to his daughter-in-law, Marie-Françoise Viennay-Pachot, widow of his son Alexandre.

The city of Berthierville, the provincial electoral district of Berthier, and the federal electoral district of Berthier—Maskinongé are named after him.
