= 1610 in Quebec =

Events from the year 1610 in Quebec.

== Events ==
- Samuel de Champlain commissions Étienne Brûlé to live for a year among the Wendat (called Hurons by the French colonists), France's First Nation allies in North America. The idea is for Brûlé to learn the language and culture of the Wendat to strengthen the alliance. In exchange, a Wendat named Savignon comes to live with the French in Quebec. Taking to the lifestyle of the Wendat, Brûlé becomes the first coureur des bois.
- de Champlain returns to Quebec after a visit to France during which he fails to renew the fur trade monopoly on furs from North America. He manages, however, to secure the support of merchants in Rouen for the colony of New France.
- The Battle of Sorel occurred on June 19, 1610, with Samuel de Champlain supported by the Kingdom of France and his allies, the Wendat people, Algonquin people and Innu people against the Mohawk people in New France at present day Sorel-Tracy, Quebec. The forces of Champlain armed with the arquebus engaged and killed or captured nearly all of the Mohawks. The battle ended major hostilities with the Mohawks for twenty years.
