= Massueville =

- Village municipality
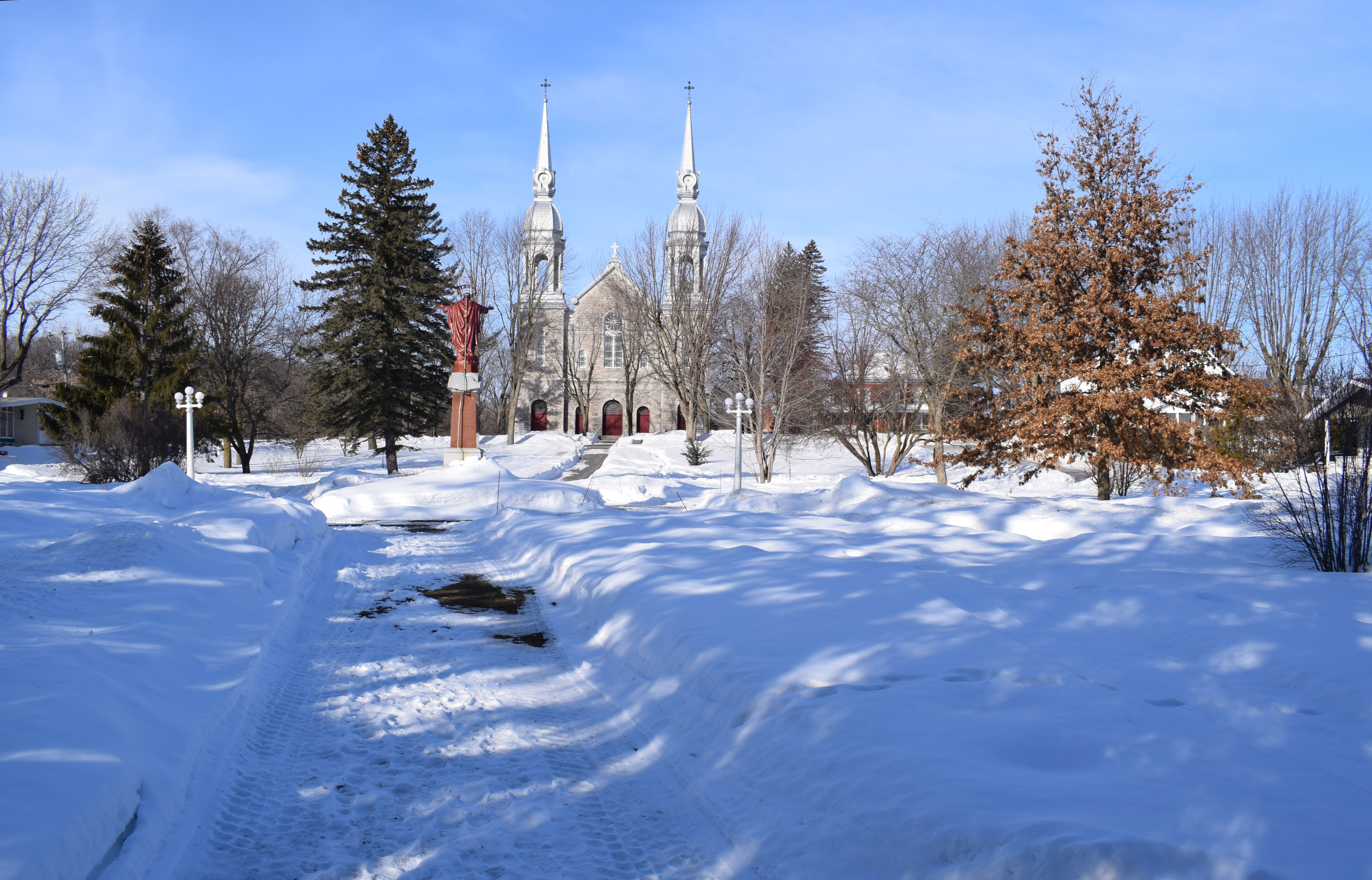

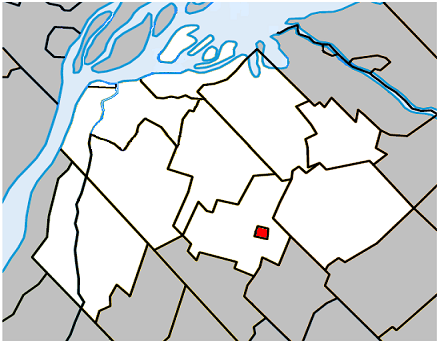
- Location within Pierre-De Saurel RCM

- Location in southern Quebec
- Coordinates: 45°55′N 72°56′W
- Country: Canada
- Province: Quebec
- Region: Montérégie
- RCM: Pierre-De Saurel
- Founded: 1835
- Constituted: March 25, 1903

Government
  - Mayor: Richard Gauthier
  - Federal riding: Bécancour—Nicolet—Saurel—Alnôbak
  - Prov. riding: Richelieu

Area
  - Total: 1.30 km^{2} (0.50 sq mi)
  - Land: 1.55 km^{2} (0.60 sq mi)
- There is an apparent contradiction between two authoritative sources

Population (2021)
  - Total: 547
  - Density: 353/km^{2} (910/sq mi)
  - Pop (2016-21): ▲3.4%
  - Dwellings: 261
- Time zone: UTC−5 (EST)
  - Summer (DST): UTC−4 (EDT)
- Postal code(s): J0G 1K0
- Area codes: 450 and 579
- Highways: R-239
- Website: www.massueville.net

Massueville is a village municipality in Pierre-De Saurel Regional County Municipality, Quebec, Canada. The population as of the 2021 Canadian census was 547.

It is named after Gaspard-Aimé Massue, landowner (1812–1875). The village is an enclave within the Municipality of Saint-Aimé. It lies along the banks of the Yamaska River.

The core of the town is composed of several well kept heritage houses.

== History ==
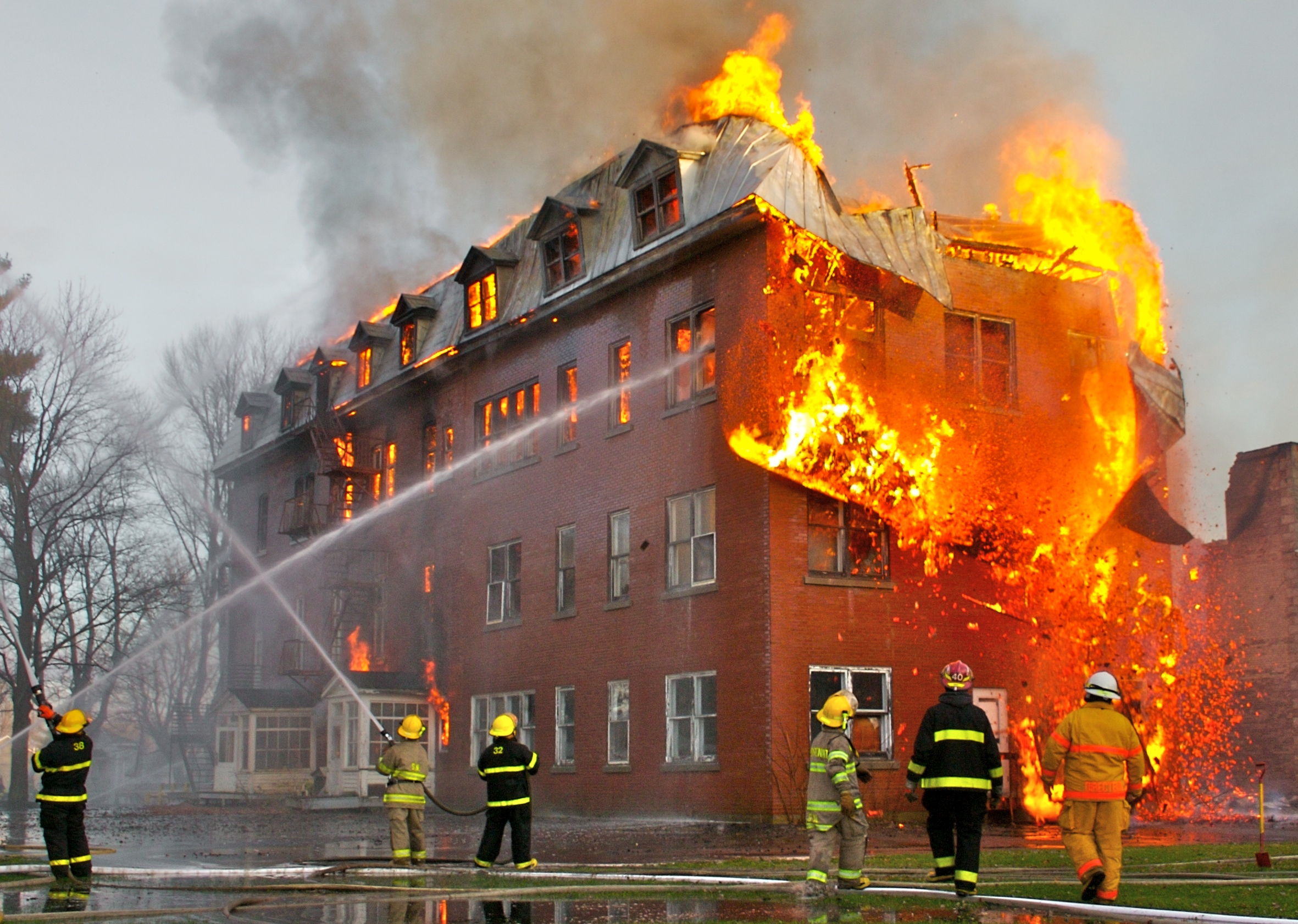
Fire involving an abandoned convent

In 1835, Gaspard-Aimé Massue, lord of the Bonsecours Seignory, donated land to the parish on which first a chapel was built that same year, followed by the church in 1841, and the original presbytery around 1850.

In 1903, the village was incorporated when it separated from the Parish Municipality of Saint-Aimé.

Massueville had a big fire near the church in an abandoned convent on 27 October 2006.

== Demographics ==
In the 2021 Census of Population conducted by Statistics Canada, Massueville had a population of 547 living in 249 of its 261 total private dwellings, a change of 3.4% from its 2016 population of 529. With a land area of 1.55 km^{2} (0.60 sq mi), it had a population density of 352.9/km^{2} (914.0/sq mi) in 2021.

Historical census populations – Massueville, Quebec

Year	Pop.	±%
1921	654	—
1931	598	−8.6%
1941	555	−7.2%
1951	575	+3.6%
1956	644	+12.0%
1961	580	−9.9%

Year	Pop.	±%
1966	606	+4.5%
1971	632	+4.3%
1976	685	+8.4%
1981	671	−2.0%
1986	621	−7.5%
1991	630	+1.4%

Year	Pop.	±%
1996	592	−6.0%
2001	557	−5.9%
2006	520	−6.6%
2011	516	−0.8%
2016	529	+2.5%
2021	547	+3.4%

Source: Statistics Canada

Mother tongue language (2021):

- English as first language: 0.9%
- French as first language: 97.3%
- Both English and French as first language: 0%
- Other as first language: 0.9%

== Local government ==
List of former mayors:

- Prospère P. Lanoie (1903–1904)
- Paul Dufault (1904–1906)
- Joseph Archambault (1906–1907)
- Joseph Ledoux (1907–1908)
- Delphis Sylvestre (1908–1909, 1923–1927, 1935–1939)
- Louis Archambault (1909–1912, 1917–1921)
- Joseph Beauregard (1912–1913)
- Michel St-Germain (1913–1914)
- George Laferté (1914–1917)
- George Ed. Hébert (1921–1923)
- Paul Boisvert (1927–1929, 1933–1935)
- Frédéric J. Normand (1929–1933)
- Albert Bélanger (1939–1947)
- Michel Proulx (1947–1948)
- Arthur Lanoie (1948–1951)
- Léonard Parent (1951–1957)
- Maurice Mathieu (1957–1959)
- Jean-Jacques Falardeau (1959–1969)
- Wildor Hébert (1969–1971, 1977–1993)
- Robert Niquette (1971–1977)
- Pierre Michaud (1993–2005)
- Denis Marion (2005–2021)
- Richard Gauthier (2021–present)

== See also ==
- List of village municipalities in Quebec
- Aignan-Aimé Massue (1781–1866), father of Gaspard-Aimé Massue
- Joseph-Aimé Massue (1860–1891), son of Gaspard-Aimé Massue
