= Vincent Basset Du Tartre =

Vincent Basset Du Tartre, (fl. 1665 – 1668), was the surgeon major of the French Carignan-Salières Regiment which arrived in New France in the summer of 1665 with about 1200 men in twenty-four companies.

The surgeon major would have had 24 surgeons under his command. The regiment was led by the new Governor General, Daniel de Rémy de Courcelle, and Lieutenant General, Alexander de Prouville, Sieur de Tracy. In 1666, Basset accompanied Daniel de Rémy in his campaign against the Five Nations.

The regiment was disbanded in 1668 and members were encouraged to settle in the new colony. Among the approximately 450 men who stayed in Canada were a number of surgeons who were a valuable asset to New France. Basset departed for France and no further written record of him has been discovered.
