= Canaqueese =

17th-century Mohawk war leader

Canaqueese was a Mohawk war leader and diplomat who lived in the 17th century in the Mohawk Valley in what is now New York State. He was of mixed heritage with a Mohawk mother and a Dutch father, but was raised and identified as Mohawk. He became an important intermediary between the French, the Dutch and the Mohawk during the intermittent conflicts known as the Beaver Wars which arose over control of the fur trade. Canaqueese participated in several attempts to reach a peace agreement between the Mohawk and New France but always acted to protect the interests of the Mohawk.

== Name ==
The Mohawk, Dutch, English, and French referred to Canaqueese by different names. Canaqueese was his Mohawk name. The Dutch called him Smits Jan. Smiths John was the anglicized version of his Dutch name, given to him by the English after they conquered New Netherland. Bâtard Flamand (Flemish Bastard) was the name given to him by the French. One French source described him as "an execrable issue of sin, the monstrous offspring of a Dutch heretic father and a pagan woman." Dutch sources, on the other hand, make no reference to his Dutch paternity as he presented as Mohawk in both dress and custom.

== Early life ==
Canaqueese was born c. 1625 near present-day Schnectady. In the matrilineal kinship system of the Mohawk, children were considered born into the mother's clan and derived their status from her family. The mother's eldest brother was more important to the children than their biological father. Canaqueese was brought up by his mother with her people and identified as Mohawk, but learned Dutch and became familiar with Dutch culture. He likely acted as an interpreter when, during the summer months, the Mohawk brought beaver pelts to trade for European goods at Fort Orange, Rensselaerswyck and Beverwyck.

Canaqueese is not named in French records before 1650 when he is described as leading a band of 25 to 30 Mohawk warriors in an attack on the French settlement at Trois Rivières. He likely took part in the 1649 invasion of Huronia which saw the Wendat (Huron) devastated by the Haudenosaunee.

In the winter of 1654, the Dutch recruited Canaquesse to carry a letter from Fort Orange to Quebec. The Dutch assured Governor Jean de Lauson that the Mohawk wanted peace, and recommended Canaqueese as an intermediary, describing him as a "savage much loved by the Mohawk."

== War leader and diplomat ==
Canaqueese was both a war leader and a diplomat during the Beaver Wars, a complex series of 17th century conflicts between New France, the Haudenosaunee Confederacy (also known as the Iroquois or Five Nations), and other Indigenous nations over control of the fur trade in the Great Lakes region. In July 1654, Canaqueese led a delegation that escorted two French captives to Quebec. Annoyed that the French had sent an envoy to the Onondoga rather than the Mohawk, and concerned that the Mohawk might lose their status as the only Haudenosaunee nation with direct access to European trade goods, Canaqueese warned the governor that the French should deal with the Mohawk instead of the Onondaga.

The Jesuit Relations record Canaqueese's speech to the governor, Jean de Lauzon:

Ought not one to enter a house by the door, and not by the chimney or roof of the cabin, unless he be a thief, and wish to take the inmates by surprise? We, the five Iroquois Nations, compose but one cabin; we maintain but one fire; and we have, from time immemorial, dwelt under one and the same roof. Well, then, will you not enter the cabin by the door, which is at the ground floor of the house? It is with us [Mohawk] that you should begin; whereas you, by beginning with the [Onondagas], try to enter by the roof and through the chimney. Have you no fear that the smoke may blind you, our fire not being extinguished, and that you may fall from the top to the bottom, having nothing solid on which to plant your feet?

In August 1656, Canaqueese led an ambush of a group of Odawa and Wendat at Lac des Deux Montagnes on the Ottawa River near Montreal. Jesuit Father Leonard Garreau, who was travelling with the Odawa and Wendat, was shot in the spine. Canaqueese brought the mortally wounded Garreau to Montreal where he died shortly afterwards.

During the Second Esopus War, Canaqueese negotiated with the Esopus for the release of Dutch captives, however, his efforts only resulted in the freeing of one woman. Dutch officials rejected his proposal to use force to rescue the other captives. Canaqueese was one of the signatories to the September 1664 treaty of friendship between the English and the Haudenosaunee following the conquest of New Netherland.

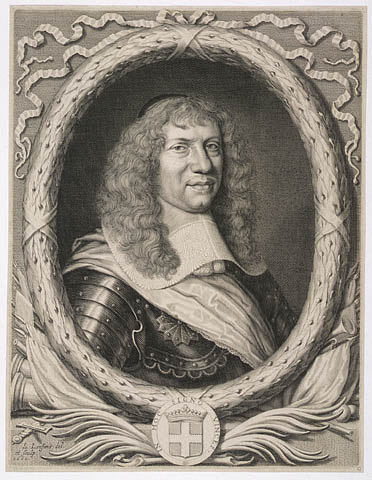
Alexandre de Prouville de Tracy

Canaqueese led a band of Mohawk that skirmished with French forces near Schenectady during Governor Daniel de Rémy de Courcelle's ill-advised midwinter attempt to attack Iroquoia in 1666. While Courcelle's expedition was a failure, it prompted the four western Haudenosaunee nations to send delegations to Quebec to negotiate peace. In July 1666, however, a group of Mohawk warriors ambushed a group of French officers hunting on Isle La Motte, killing seven and taking four prisoners. In response, the lieutenant-général of New France, Alexandre de Prouville de Tracy, imprisoned many of the delegates.

In August 1666, a retaliatory expedition against the Mohawk, led by Captain Pierre de Saurel of the Carignan-Salières Regiment met a peace delegation headed by Canaqueese that was returning the four captives to New France. Saurel ordered his expedition to turn back and he escorted the delegation to Quebec.

Although he was not permitted to leave Quebec, Canaqueese was given preferential treatment because one of the returned captives was a relative of the lieutenant-général. Cananqueese was gifted "a fine suit of clothing" by Tracy and was allowed some freedom of movement within the town. Marie de l'Incarnation, an Ursuline nun, wrote that the intendant, Jean Talon, treated the "Bâtard Flamand ... like a great lord."

Tracy, however, was tired of Haudenosaunee prevarication and in September 1666 launched a large scale invasion of Mohawk territory. According to Marie de l"Incarnation the Haudenosaunee captives at Quebec wept "like children" and that "tears fell from the Bâtard Flamand's eyes at seeing such fine troops in good array." Canaqueese warned Tracy that many French soldiers would perish since the Mohawk would "fight to the end," but he also asked the lieutenant-général to "preserve" his wife and children.

Although the expedition failed to engage the Mohawk in battle, the French torched all four of the abandoned Mohawk towns and the fields of maize that surrounded them. When Tracy returned to Quebec in early November, he had one of the Mohawk captives hanged. He released Canaqueese, who "feared it [hanging] more than the others," and ordered him to present Tracy's conditions to the Mohawk. The Mohawk were given "four moons" to respond or Tracy would hang the remaining Haudenosaunee detainees. The conditions included providing hostage families and the repatriation of Wendat and Algonquin adoptees. Canaqueese returned to Quebec the following April but without any adoptees or hostage families. Tracy threatened to invade again if his terms were not met, and sent Canaqueese back with all but two of the male Haudenosaunee prisoners held at Quebec. A peace settlement was reached in July 1667 when a Mohawk and Oneida delegation brought several families to Quebec, and invited Jesuit missionaries to their homelands.

Canaqueese may have been one of several Mohawk who were baptized at Quebec in 1667. Because of increasing conflict between traditionalist Mohawk and those willing to convert to Catholicism, a number of Mohawk families including Canaqueese migrated to the St. Lawrence River valley and established a settlement on the south shore of the river near Montreal.

== 1687 Denonville Expedition ==
Canaqueese is not named again in any sources until 1687, when he is named as one of the "Christian Indians" who fought against the Seneca with the forces of the Marquis de Denonville. When some of the Christian Mohawk wanted to turn back, the aging Canaqueese exhorted them to continue. Canadian historian Mark Meuwese argues that attacking Iroquoia was "not necessarily an indication of his abandonment of an Iroquois identity," but that "since the Iroquois refugee communities in the St. Lawrence valley were politically independent from the Five Nations, the Flemish Bastard may have sincerely viewed the Senecas as an obstacle to the interests of the Christian Indians."
