= Hugues Randin =

Hugues Randin (c. 1628 – c. 1680) was a French engineer in the employ of Governor Louis de Buade de Frontenac. He was also a cartographer and, in the practice of the day, an architect on at least one project.

The first we know of Hugues Randin is his arrival in New France in 1665 as part of the Carignan-Salières Regiment. The regiment was repatriated in 1668 and he stayed in New France.

By 1671, he was working for Talon and made a trip to Fort Pentagouet to determine its condition. The next year he was granted a seigneury on the St. Lawrence.

In 1673, Randin designed and supervised construction of Fort Frontenac, a trading post and military fort built in what is now Kingston, Ontario, Canada. He remained in Frontenac's service and received another seigneury, this time in Acadia. After his death, this property was given to Hôtel-Dieu de Québec by his heir.
