= Saint-Joseph-de-Sorel =

- Town
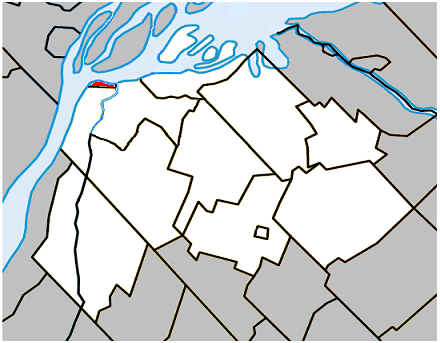
- Location within Pierre-De Saurel RCM.

- Location in southern Quebec.
- Coordinates: 46°02′N 73°07′W
- Country: Canada
- Province: Quebec
- Region: Montérégie
- RCM: Pierre-De Saurel
- Constituted: May 1, 1907

Government
  - Mayor: Vincent Deguise
  - Federal riding: Bécancour—Nicolet—Saurel—Alnôbak
  - Prov. riding: Richelieu

Area
  - Total: 3.40 km^{2} (1.31 sq mi)
  - Land: 1.38 km^{2} (0.53 sq mi)

Population (2016)
  - Total: 1,642
  - Density: 1,192.7/km^{2} (3,089/sq mi)
  - Pop 2011-2016: ▼2.1%
  - Median after-tax income: $20,256 per year
- Time zone: UTC−5 (EST)
  - Summer (DST): UTC−4 (EDT)
- Postal code(s): J3R
- Area codes: 450 and 579
- Highways: R-132
- Website: www.vsjs.ca

Saint-Joseph-de-Sorel (French pronunciation: [sɛ̃ ʒozɛf də sɔʁɛl]) is a town in the Regional county municipality of Pierre-De Saurel, in Montérégie, Quebec. It is located north of the Tracy section of Sorel-Tracy. Champlain Street marks the town's southern limit from Sorel-Tracy, and the rest of the town is surrounded by water (either Saint Lawrence River or Richelieu River).

As it is the case with neighbouring municipalities, metallurgy plays a significant role in the town's economy. The Sorel-Tracy based QIT et Titane has a facility which occupies the western part of the town, while the eastern part of the town is essentially home to the Les Forges de Sorel company. This leaves the central part as the only portion of the town that is fully residential.

The population of Saint-Joseph-de-Sorel was 1,677 as of the Canada 2011 Census.

== Demographics ==
In the 2021 Census of Population conducted by Statistics Canada, Saint-Joseph-de-Sorel had a population of 1,581 living in 861 of its 917 total private dwellings, a change of −3.7% from its 2016 population of 1,642. With a land area of 1.36 km^{2} (0.53 sq mi), it had a population density of 1,162.5/km^{2} (3,010.9/sq mi) in 2021.

Population trend:

Census	Population	Change (%)
2016	1,642	▼2.1%
2011	1,677	▼0.5%
2006	1,686	▼4.1%
2001	1,758	▼6.2%
1996	1,875	▼9.4%
1991	2,069	N/A

Mother tongue language (2016)

Language	Population	Pct (%)
French only	1,580	96.93%
English only	35	2.15%
Both English & French	10	0.61%
Other languages	10	0.61%

== See also ==
- List of cities in Quebec
