= Fort Sainte Anne (Vermont) =

Coordinates: 44°54′00″N 73°20′51″W

- Isle La Motte, Vermont
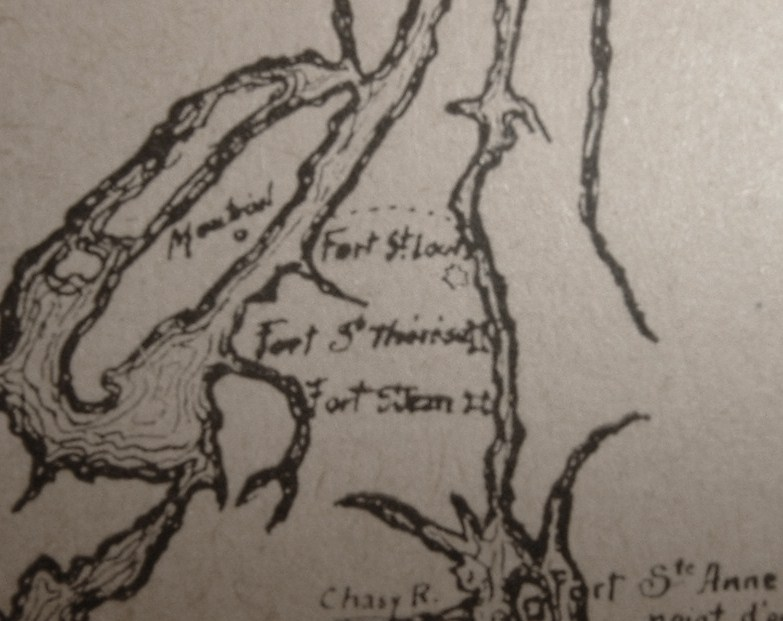
- Map of Fort Sainte-Anne and other forts on the Richelieu River, circa 1666 for the campagne of the Regiment of Carignan-Salières

Site information
- Type: Fort
- Controlled by: New France; Canada

Site history
- Built: 1666
- In use: 1666-1671

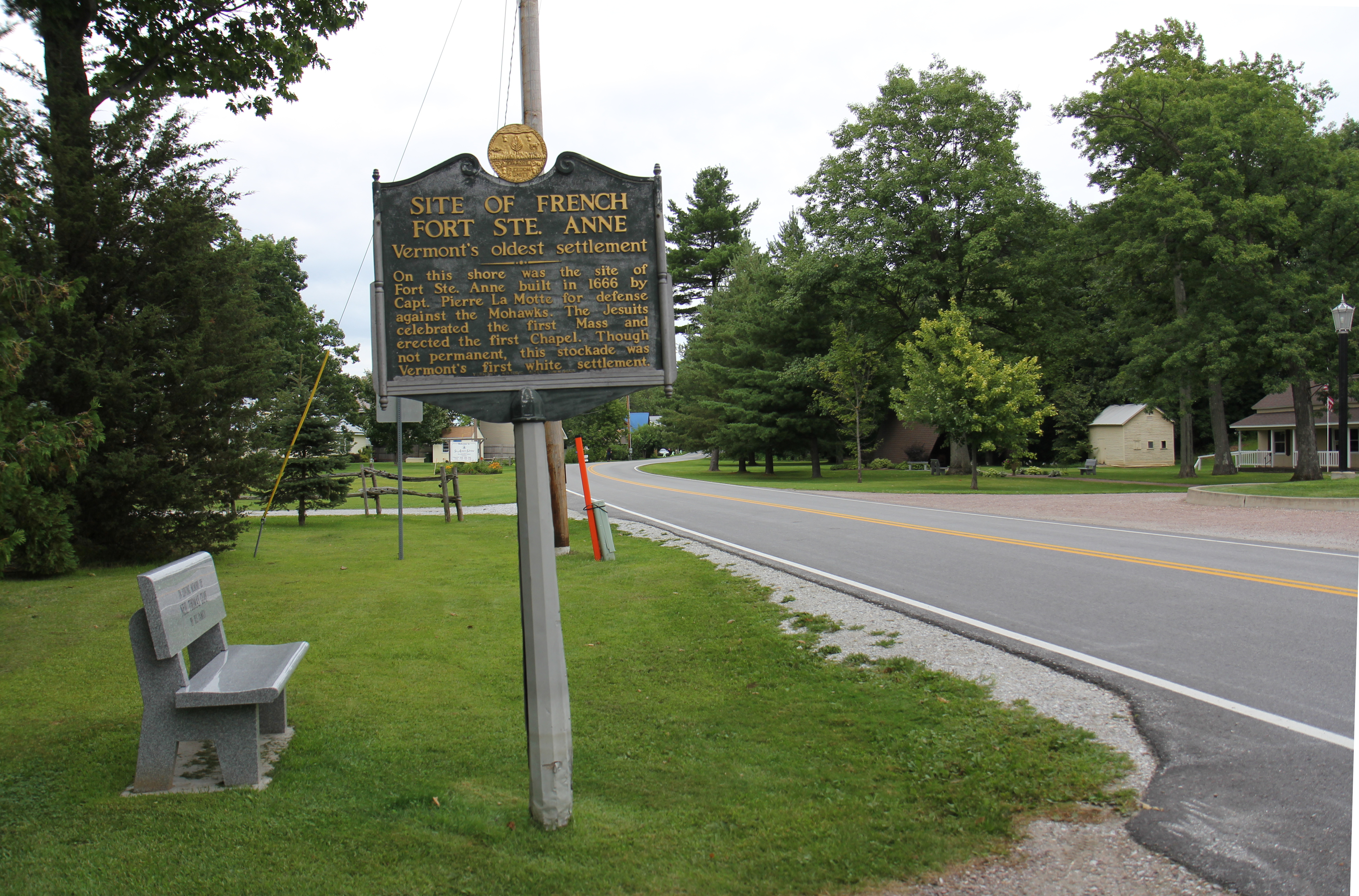
2014 Sign marking proximity of Fort Sainte Anne

In 1666, the French built a fort on Isle La Motte, to protect New France from the Haudenosaunee (Iroquois). The fort was dedicated to Saint Anne. Fort Sainte Anne was the most vulnerable to attacks by the Haudenosaunee, because it was the last of five forts stretching along the Richelieu River going south. The other four were Fort Richelieu, Fort Chambly, Fort Sainte Thérèse and Fort Saint-Jean.

Lieutenant Général Alexandre de Prouville de Tracy, who had been sent to New France to end the threat of the Haudenosaunee to the colony had the forts built by soldiers of the Carignan-Salières Regiment. The first three forts were built in 1665, and the other two in 1666. By the summer of 1666 four of the five Haudenosaunee nations had negotiated peace settlements with the French, however, the Mohawk In the fall of 1666, Tracy led an expedition against the Mohawk. 600 soldiers, 600 volunteers, and 100 Wendat and Algonquins rendezvoused at Fort Ste. Anne, crossed Lake Champlain and Lake George in canoes and batteaux and marched overland into Mohawk territory. The Mohawk abandoned their villages and fled. The French burned the villages and the surrounding fields then returned to Fort Sainte Anne. The following year a peace settlement was reached. The peace lasted for 17 years.
