= Alexandre de Prouville de Tracy =

French military leader and statesman (c.1603–1670)

Alexandre de Prouville de Tracy Seigneur of Tracy-le-Val and Tracy-le-Mont
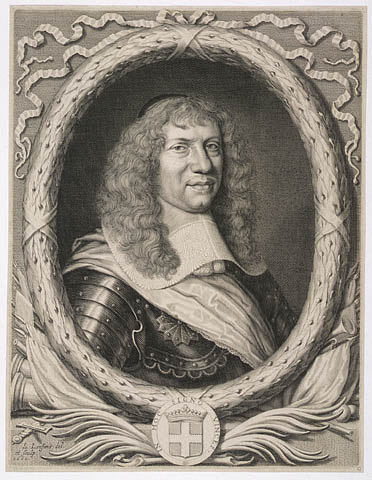
- Born: c. 1603; Amiens
- Died: 28 April 1670; Paris
- Occupations: Military leader and statesman

Lieutenant Général of the Americas
- In office November 1664 – 1667

Governor general of the French Antilles
- In office 7 Jun 1664 – April 1665
- Preceded by: Phillippe de Longvilliers de Poincy
- Succeeded by: Antoine Lefèbvre de La Barre

Governor of New France (acting)
- In office 6 May 1665 – 12 September 1665
- Preceded by: Augustin de Saffray de Mésy
- Succeeded by: Daniel de Rémy de Courcelle

Alexandre de Prouville de Tracy (French pronunciation: [alɛksɑ̃dʁ də pʁuvil də tʁasi]; c. 1603 – 1670) was a French military leader, statesman, and the seigneur of Tracy-le-Val and Tracy-le-Mont in Picardy, France. A professional soldier, he was a regimental commander during the Thirty Years Wars, and was later appointed commissary general of French forces in Germany. In 1663, he was commissioned lieutenant-général of the French colonies in the Americas. In 1664, he led an expedition that expelled the Dutch from Guiana. The following year he sailed to New France where, in 1666, he led the Carignan-Salieres Regiment and Canadien volunteers in an invasion of the Mohawk homeland. He returned to France after reaching peace settlements with the Mohawk and the other Haudenosaunee (Iroquois) nations, and was appointed commandant at Dunkirk, and later governor of the Château Trompette in Bordeaux.

== Early life ==
Alexandre de Prouville de Tracy, the son of Pierre de Prouville, bailiff of the citadel of Amiens, and Marie Bochart de Champigny, was born in Amiens c. 1603. He married Marie de Belin in Paris on 17 November 1624. Tracy had had a son, Charles-Henri, who died at Landrecies in 1655 during the Franco-Spanish War, and a daughter, Marie Chrisante. Tracy married his second wife, Louise de Fouilleuse, on 15 April 1657 at Saint-Eustache in Paris.

Tracy was a professional soldier who was recorded as a captain of light horse in 1632. After the French intervened in the Thirty Years War, he served as a regimental commander and fought in several battles including the Battle of Wolfenbüttel, the Battle of Kempen, the Battle of Freiburg, the Siege of Philippsburg, and the Battle of Nordlingen. He was appointed commissary general of the French army in Germany, and represented France in negotiations with Sweden and the Elector of Bavaria that led to the 1647 Truce of Ulm.

== Lieutenant Général of the Americas ==
For many years the small French settlements on the north shore of the St. Lawrence River had been the subject of attacks by the Haudenosaunee. By the early 1660s, the colony was on the verge of collapse. After receiving numerous pleas for help, Louis XIV took several steps to ensure the survival of New France, including sending professional soldiers.

In November 1663, Tracy was commissioned by Louis XIV as "lieutenant général throughout the length and breadth of the continental countries under our authority situated in South and North America." He was assigned two tasks: remove the Dutch from Cayenne (a former French colony in Guiana), and end the threat of the Haudenosaunee to New France. The Carignan-Salières Regiment, commanded by Henri de Chastelard de Salières, was assigned to Tracy and would sail directly to Quebec while the lieutenant général was in the West Indies.

Tracy sailed from La Rochelle in February 1664 accompanied by Antoine Lefèbvre de La Barre, four companies of infantry from the Broglie, Chambellé, Orléans and Poitou regiments, and 650 settlers for the French colonies in the West Indies. Tracy's expedition captured Cayenne without opposition in May 1664. Leaving Le Barre and a garrison at Cayenne, Tracy sailed to Martinique where he reappointed the governor, then proceeded to Guadeloupe where a new governor was installed. He also installed a new governor to the island of Grenada called Monsieur de Vincent.

In April 1665, Tracy left Guadeloupe for the Gulf of St. Lawrence. After anchoring off Percé, Tracy and the soldiers that had accompanied him to the West Indies transferred to smaller ships and disembarked at Quebec on 30 June, 11 days after the first four companies of the Carignan-Salières had arrived from France. To avoid overcrowding in Quebec, Tracy sent the Carignan-Salières companies to build three forts along the Richelieu River, the main route used by the Mohawk in their raids on French settlements. Fort Richelieu was restored and Fort Sainte Anne was erected the following spring on Isle La Motte at the northern end of Lake Champlain. Salières and eight more companies of the Carignan-Salières landed at Quebec in mid-August. The newly appointed Governor General of New France, Daniel de Rémy de Courcelle, and the newly appointed intendant, Jean Talon, arrived with the final contingent of eight companies in mid-September.

Tracy quickly recognized that of the five Haudenosaunee nations, the Mohawk were the most aggressive towards the French. For many years the Mohawk had raided French settlements, and had disrupted the flow of beaver pelts to Montreal by blockading the Ottawa and St. Lawrence Rivers. While the Onondaga, Oneida, Seneca, and Cayuga appeared willing to discuss peace, the Mohawk did not. In December 1665 an Onondaga and Oneida delegation arrived at Quebec to begin negotiations on behalf of themselves and the Seneca and Cayuga.

Tracy authorized Courcelle to lead an expedition of 500 regulars and Canadien volunteers against the Mohawk in the winter of 1666. The French soldiers, however, were ill-equipped to operate in the cold and deep snow. They were unaccustomed to using snowshoes, and many suffered from exhaustion, frostbite or hypothermia. Algonquin guides were to meet the expedition at Fort St. Louis, however, after waiting several weeks, Courcelle set off without them. Without guides the expedition frequently lost their way, and provisions soon became scarce. The expedition eventually reached the Anglo-Dutch settlement of Schenectady where Courcelle was able to purchase supplies. While at Schenectady a French patrol skirmished with the Mohawk resulting in the deaths of one officer, five soldiers and one volunteer. Courcelle decided to abandon the invasion and return to the Richelieu River forts. The Jesuit Relations record that over 60 men died from hunger during the expedition, while Captain Francois de Tapie de Monteil of the Poitou Regiment wrote in his journal that "we lost 400 men who dropped dead from cold."

A Seneca delegation arrived at Quebec in May and quickly negotiated a treaty of friendship. An Oneida delegation followed in July and within a week had agreed to a similar treaty. Later that month, however, news arrived that a hunting party on Ile La Motte had been ambushed by the Mohawk. Seven soldiers were killed and four others taken captive including Tracy's cousin, Lieutenant Louis de Canchy de Lerole. Tracy ordered the Oneida delegation brought back to Quebec and imprisoned. Captain Pierre de Saurel of the Carignan-Salières was tasked with leading 200 men in a retaliatory strike against the Mohawk. The expedition was within two days march of Mohawk territory when they encountered a delegation led by the warrior known as the Flemish Bastard who was bringing the unharmed French prisoners back to Fort Sainte Anne. The expedition turned back and Saurel escorted the Mohawk delegation to Quebec.

Delegations from all five Haudenosaunee nations were in Quebec by late August. Tracy, however, had grown impatient with their lengthy harangues and prevarication. Talon and Courcelle agreed with Tracy that a military solution was needed. 600 French soldiers, 600 Canadien volunteers, and 100 Algonquin and Wendat warriors rendezvoused at Fort Sainte Anne at the end of September. The expedition crossed Lake Champlain and Lake George in canoes and bateaux, then marched overland to reach the Mohawk villages in mid-October. All four villages had been hastily abandoned. Tracy ordered the longhouses and surrounding fields burned, then led the expedition back to Fort Sainte Anne. Despite not having engaged the Mohawk in battle, the expedition was considered a success. The only casualties were eight men who drowned when their canoes overturned on Lake Champlain during a storm.

Upon his return to Quebec, Tracy had a Mohawk prisoner hanged and sent the Flemish Bastard and two Oneida back to their people with his terms for peace. The Mohawk were given four months to release their Algonquin and Wendat captives and bring Mohawk and Oneida families to Quebec to serve as hostages. When the Flemish Bastard returned in April 1667 without any hostage families, Tracy threatened another invasion. A peace settlement was finally reached in July when several hostage families arrived at Quebec, and requested Jesuit missionaries be sent to the Mohawk and Oneida homelands.

== Return to France ==
In August 1667, Tracy returned to France leaving Courcelle, Talon, and the Sovereign Council to govern New France. Without the threat of Haudenosaunee raids the colony entered a period of growth and prosperity that lasted until 1684.

Marie de l'Incarnation wrote that Tracy had "won over everyone by his good works and by the great examples of virtue and religion which he has given the whole country." Tracy sponsored the education of indigenous children, paid for a chapel to be built for the Ursulines, and made a substantial donation to the Jesuits for their chapel. He reorganized the Sovereign Council, and sent the governor of Montreal, Paul de Chomedey, Sieur de Maisonneuve back to France on indefinite leave, replacing him with Zacharie Dupuy. When Tracy returned to France, Intendant Jean Talon wrote that "he has set the affairs of Canada in such good order that I shall have little to do there."

Tracy was named commandant of Dunkirk shortly after his return, and in October 1668 was appointed governor of the Château Trompette in Bordeaux. He died in Paris in the parish of Saint-Eustache on 28 April 1670.

== Legacy ==
Tracy, a city on the south shore of the St Lawrence River at the mouth of the Richelieu River was incorporated in 1952 but merged with the much older City of Sorel in 2000 to form Sorel-Tracy. The Tracy Squadron of cadets at the Royal Military College Saint-Jean is named after Tracy. Some 17th-century Jesuit missionaries referred to Lake Superior as Lac Tracy after Alexandre de Prouville de Tracy.
