= Saint-Aimé, Quebec =

Saint-Aimé
- Municipality
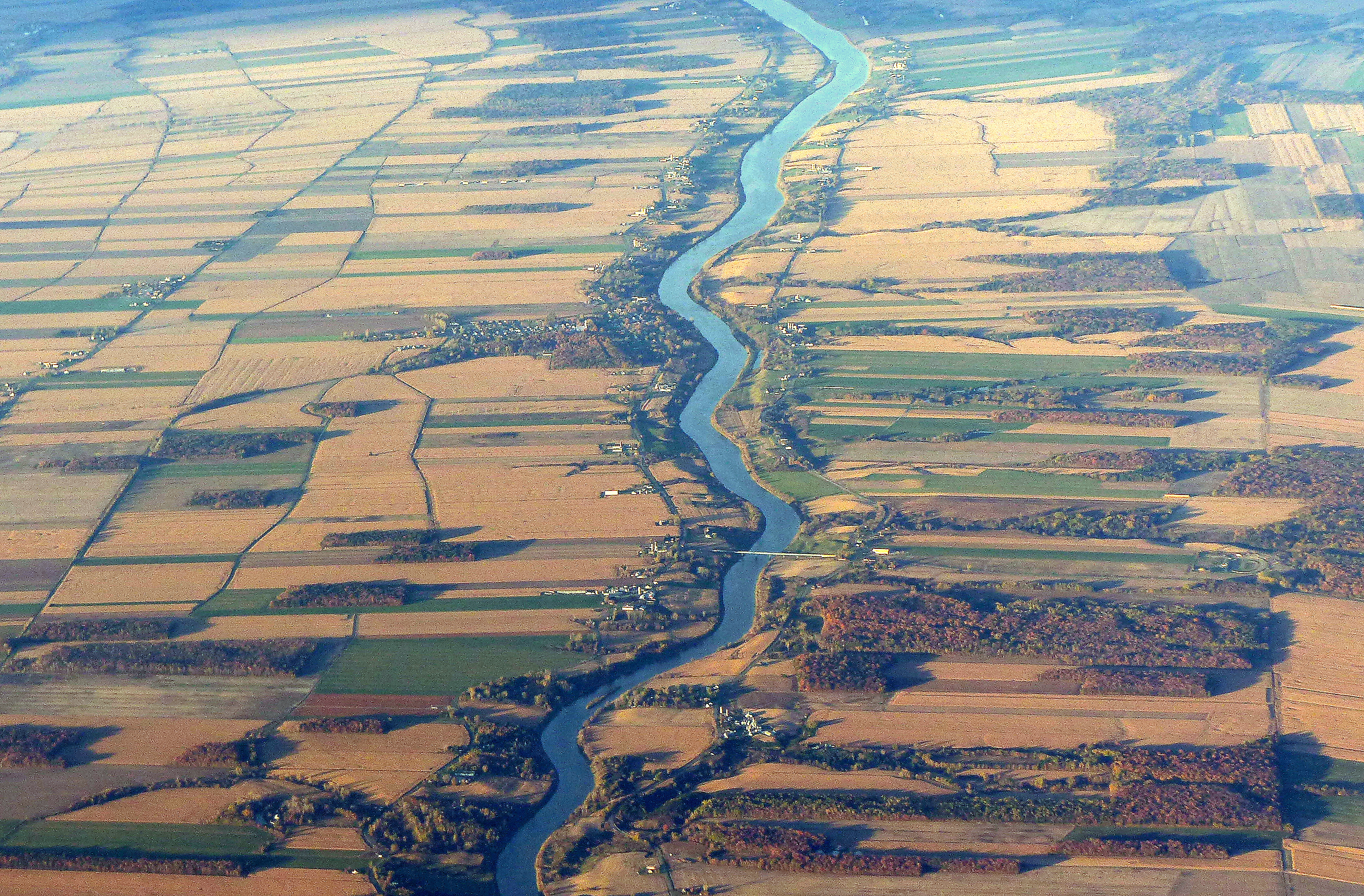

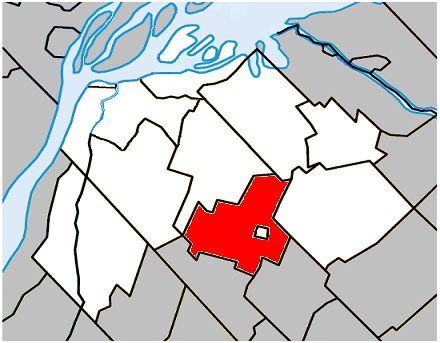
- Location within Pierre-De Saurel RCM.

- Location in southern Quebec.
- Coordinates: 45°55′N 72°56′W
- Country: Canada
- Province: Quebec
- Region: Montérégie
- RCM: Pierre-De Saurel
- Constituted: July 1, 1855

Government
  - Mayor: Denis Benoît
  - Federal riding: Bécancour—Nicolet—Saurel—Alnôbak
  - Prov. riding: Richelieu

Area
  - Total: 62.40 km^{2} (24.09 sq mi)
  - Land: 60.53 km^{2} (23.37 sq mi)

Population (2021)
  - Total: 405
  - Density: 6.7/km^{2} (17/sq mi)
  - Pop 2016-2021: ▼12.1%
  - Dwellings: 184
- Time zone: UTC−5 (EST)
  - Summer (DST): UTC−4 (EDT)
- Postal code(s): J0G 1K0
- Area codes: 450 and 579
- Highways: R-235; R-239
- Website: www.saintaime.qc.ca

Saint-Aimé (French pronunciation: [sɛ̃t‿ɛme]) is a municipality in the Pierre-De Saurel Regional County Municipality, in Montérégie, Quebec. The population as of the Canada 2021 Census was 545.

== Demographics ==
=== Population ===
Population trend:

Census	Population	Change (%)
2021	405	▼12.1%
2016	461	▼8.7%
2011	505	▼3.4%
2006	523	▼1.5%
2001	531	▼5.2%
1996	560	▼5.2%
1991	591	▲4.4%
1986	566	▼7.2%
1981	610	▼0.8%
1976	615	▼2.4%
1971	630	▼7.5%
1966	681	▼6.5%
1961	728	▲2.7%
1956	709	▲7.9%
1951	657	▼16.1%
1941	783	▼0.9%
1931	790	▼10.1%
1921	879	▼19.2%
1911	1,088	▼44.7%
1901	1,967	▼20.7%
1891	2,481	▲10.1%
1881	2,254	▼28.4%
1871	3,150	▼6.5%
1861	3,368	N/A

=== Language ===
Mother tongue language (2021)

Language	Population	Pct (%)
French only	385	95.1%
English only	0	0.0%
Both English & French	0	0.0%
Other languages	15	3.7%

== See also ==
- List of municipalities in Quebec
