= Sorel-Tracy =

- City
- Ville de Sorel-Tracy
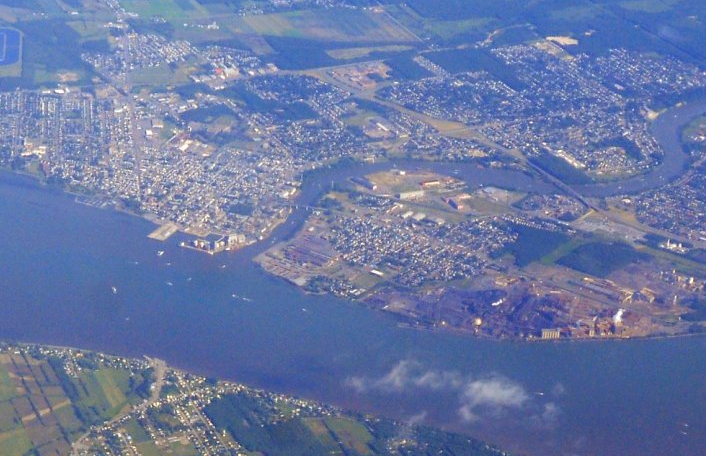
- Aerial view of Sorel-Tracy

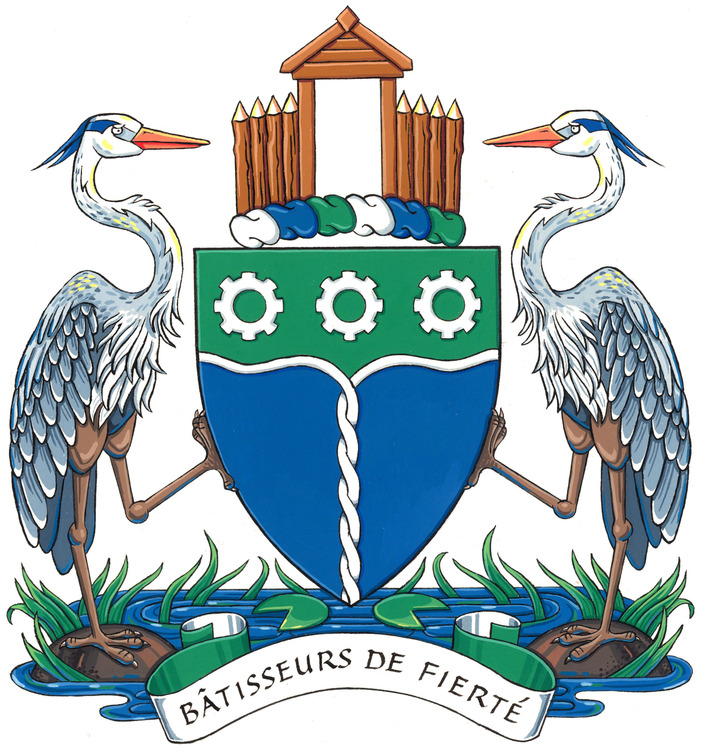
- Coat of arms

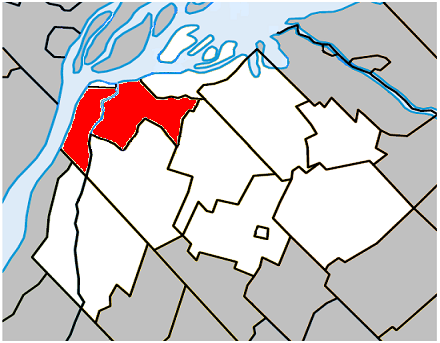
- Location within Pierre-De Saurel RCM.

- Location in southern Quebec.
- Coordinates: 46°02′N 73°07′W
- Country: Canada
- Province: Quebec
- Region: Montérégie
- RCM: Pierre-De Saurel
- Constituted: March 15, 2000

Government
  - Mayor: Patrick Péloquin
  - Federal riding: Bécancour—Nicolet—Saurel—Alnôbak
  - Prov. riding: Richelieu

Area
  - Land: 57.28 km^{2} (22.12 sq mi)
  - Urban: 30.61 km^{2} (11.82 sq mi)
  - Metro: 170.31 km^{2} (65.76 sq mi)

Population (2021)
  - City: 35,165
  - Density: 614/km^{2} (1,590/sq mi)
  - Urban: 36,650
  - Urban density: 1,197.3/km^{2} (3,101/sq mi)
  - Metro: 41,934
  - Metro density: 246.2/km^{2} (638/sq mi)
  - Pop 2016–2021: ▲0.7%
  - Dwellings: 17,069
- Time zone: UTC−5 (EST)
  - Summer (DST): UTC−4 (EDT)
- Postal code(s): J3P-J3R
- Area codes: 450 and 579
- Highways A-30: R-132; R-133; R-223
- Website: www.ville.sorel-tracy.qc.ca

Sorel-Tracy (/sɔːˈrɛl træˈsiː/; French: [sɔʁɛl tʁaˈsi]) is a city in southwestern Quebec, Canada and the geographical end point of the Champlain Valley. It is located at the confluence of the Richelieu River and the St. Lawrence River, on the western edge of Lac Saint-Pierre, downstream and northeast of Montreal. The population as of the Canada 2021 census was 35,165. Its mayor is Patrick Péloquin and it is the seat of the Pierre-De Saurel Regional County Municipality and the judicial district of Richelieu.

The city is the result of a voluntary merger in March 2000 between two former municipalities, Sorel and Tracy, which developed on opposite shores of the Richelieu River: Tracy on the west shore and Sorel on the east shore. Sorel itself had annexed in 1992 the municipality of Saint-Pierre-de-Sorel; today it forms the southern part of its territory.

Sorel was founded in 1642. Tracy was founded on February 10, 1954, but prior to that, it was a parish municipality known as Saint-Joseph de Sorel. (This is not to be confused with the town of Saint-Joseph-de-Sorel, an independent municipality north of Tracy).

Sorel-Tracy is known for manufacturing related to the steel industry and metallurgy. It has a ferry linking the city to the village of Saint-Ignace-de-Loyola. Its shipyard built units of three frigates for the Canadian forces, and two ships in the late 1960s.

== History ==
Early exploration in this area by the French was a catalyst for armed conflict with various indigenous peoples. The French also learned about existing rivalries among these nations and sought to build its own alliances with First Nations. The Battle of Sorel occurred on June 19, 1610: Samuel de Champlain had some French regulars or local militia, as well as First Nations allies, the Wendat (also known as Huron by the French), Algonquin and Innu peoples. Together they held off the powerful Mohawk people in New France.

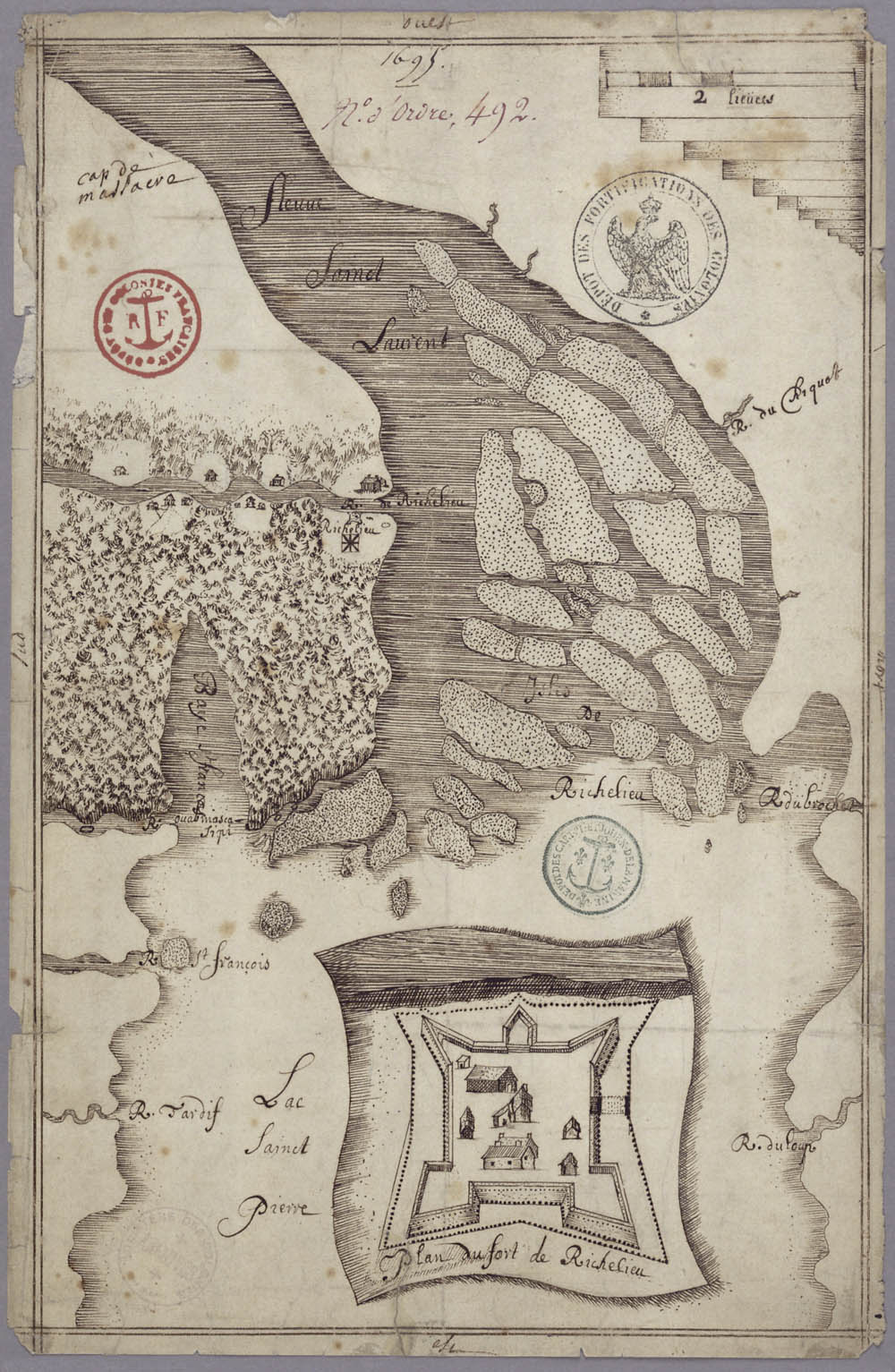
Plan of Fort Richelieu, 1695.

Sorel is the fourth-oldest city in the province of Quebec. Its formation began in 1642 when Charles Huault de Montmagny, first Governor and Lieutenant-Governor of New France, built Fort Richelieu here as a defense for settlers and river travellers against the Haudenosaunee, primarily the Mohawk, the powerful easternmost nation in the Confederacy-based south of the Great Lakes.

In 1647, the original fort was destroyed by the Mohawk, but it was rebuilt by the Carignan-Salières Regiment on the same site in 1665.

The name Sorel comes from the first seigneur of the area, Pierre de Saurel. He was in command of a company of the Carignan-Salières Regiment that landed in New France in August 1665. He was granted a seigneury by King Louis XIV in 1672, after having already built a manor house four years prior. The parish of Tracy was named for Lieutenant General Alexander de Prouville, Sieur de Tracy, who was overall in command of the Carignan-Salières Regiment directly under the Governor.

After Prince William Henry, Duke of Gloucester visited Sorel in 1787, the town took the name of William-Henry, a name it retained until 1845.

It is probable that before the American Revolution, there were no English-speaking, Protestant people in Sorel, as it had been settled by French-speaking colonists and their descendants, who were primarily Catholic. Although a hamlet or small village, it was the scene of much activity during the war and after.

During 1776 large bodies of troops passed through and at times were stationed in the area. For example, the English quartered in Sorel the German auxiliaries they hired after they reached Quebec. Governor Frederick Haldimand wrote a letter to Lord George Germain in October 1778, from his camp in Sorel where fortifications were in progress, proposing his use of the Seigneurie,

It is my intention therefore, if time and circumstances favour me, to make Sorel a place of strength with Permanent Works, as the importance of it deserves. The Seigneurie of this Place is vested in merchants residing in England and the Inhabitants of it, people remarkable for their courage and resolution, have distinguished themselves very much by their attachment to the Government even at a time the Rebels were Masters of that Country, in which account I think it would serve the King's interest to bestow some Public mark of favour upon them such as remitting them the Quitrents which they pay for their land, to the Seigneur, and the Seigneurie being to be sold, and the purchase would not exceed 13,000, having been offered for that sum, I submit to Your Lordship whether it would not be best to give orders to treat immediately with the Proprietors, Messrs. Greenwood and Higgins in London, both for enabling me to effect the purchase...

The Crown purchased the land in 1781, at the end of the war, and Sorel became a clearing house for the steady stream of Loyalist refugees from the south. A number settled in Sorel, forming the nucleus of the English-speaking population. Also, the Crown selected Sorel as one of the stations for "Military Invalids", or "Outside Chelsea Pensioners", as they were also called. Several hundred older veterans and their dependents were sent to Sorel under the medical care of Dr. Christopher Carter. There facilities had to be built for them.

The earliest British efforts for the propagation of the Protestant religion in Lower Canada started in Sorel. With the continued influx of Loyalists during 1783 into the Seigniory (as the English spell it), the settlement sought a permanent Protestant minister. That year they sent a petition to the Society for the Propagation of the Gospel in Foreign Parts, of the Anglican Church, begging them to send a Minister of the Gospel to reside in the Seigniory.

The Reverend John Doty was assigned to the post, embarking during the month of April 1784 at Gravesend, England, and arriving at Quebec in June. He reached Sorel on 4 July 1784, where he celebrated Divine Service (or communion) and preached his first sermon. This is the date of the foundation of the Anglican parish in Sorel and the first Anglican mission in Canada.

They used as the chapel a wooden building located at the end of King Street, a few steps from the Richelieu market. This building had earlier served as a military storehouse. In 1819, the town's parsonage was declared dangerously unfit.

At the beginning of the 19th century, Sorel was a centre of fur traders, who had been established in Quebec and among the indigenous peoples from the earliest years of the colony. The character of the town changed over the next few decades as more permanent settlers arrived.

In the 1820s, Sorel was the site of the governor's house for the Governor General of Lower Canada, then George Ramsay, the Lord Dalhousie. (He is the namesake of Dalhousie University.) Ramsay quickly purchased land in the area to be developed for agriculture. Due to his presence, the small town became a centre for the turbulent politics of that time, in the period leading up to the Lower Canada Rebellion.

Locally, the colonial governor and parish priest Jean-Baptiste Kelly competed for power and influence among the different ethnic groups. Kelly oversaw a number of improvements and changes during his years in the town. The "dangerous" parsonage was rebuilt by 1832 (using stone from the original). The town changed its name back to Sorel from William-Henry in 1845, reflecting its demographics and predominately French Catholic population.

Kelly helped improve the parish library, which contained four hundred volumes by 1846. In 1848 the community erected a monument to temperance. They established a society for the care of the poor and sick, and for the education of girls. Kelly retired in 1849, after the completion of a new clergy house. The older one was adapted for use as a college. In the long term, the town continued to be settled primarily by French Canadians, rather than developing any sizable Anglo-Canadian population.

In 1839 two residents were defendants in a murder trial. An American, George Holmes, who lived in Sorel, was linked to Joséphine d’Estimauville, a married woman who had been staying with her mother in Sorel after leaving her abusive husband. The pair were arrested after Holmes became a suspect for killing her husband Louis-Pascal-Achille Taché (21 June 1813 – 31 January 1839), seigneur of Kamouraska since 1833. This seigneury was located in the Bas-Saint-Laurent region of eastern Quebec. Holmes fled to the United States, escaped extradition, and disappeared. D’Estimauville was tried for complicity in the death of her husband, but acquitted.

In 1970, Anne Hébert published a novel, Kamouraska, inspired by the affair. It was adapted as a 1973 film of the same name, directed by Claude Jutra and starring Geneviève Bujold and Richard Jordan.

The shipyards in Sorel were long important to its economy. In the late 20th century, the city was the site of construction of three of 12 Halifax-class frigates of the Canadian Forces. The three Canadian patrol frigates built in Quebec were HMCS Ville de Québec, HMCS Regina and HMCS Calgary. The shipyard in Sorel-Tracy was called M.I.L. Tracy. It built units for all three vessels and sent them by barge for final assembly at M.I.L. Davie in Lauzon, Quebec.

Previous to the construction of the Halifax-class frigates, MIL (Marine Industries Ltd, operated by the Simard family of Sorel, constructed HMCS Nipigon, which was commissioned there in 1964. MIL was also the site of construction of HMCS Bras d'Or, an experimental hydrofoil commissioned by the Royal Canadian Navy. The construction of both these ships was overseen by Cmdr. Donald Clark CD RCN.

== Economy ==
The city is home to the Tracy Thermal Generating Station.

The city is home to a shipyard, which built several Royal Canadian Navy ships in the 20th century.

The city is home to QIT-Fer et Titane, a titanium smelter and refinery now owned by the Rio Tinto.

=== Transportation ===
Sorel-Tracy is within 75 kilometres (47 mi) of both Montreal and Trois-Rivières and is easily accessible via Autoroute 30 from the west and via Route 132 from the east and west. Autoroute 30 stops at Sorel and picks up again at Bécancour, leaving an incomplete segment in between.

A year-round ferry operates on the St. Lawrence River between Sorel-Tracy and Saint-Ignace-de-Loyola on the way to Berthierville.

== Geography ==
=== Climate ===
Climate data for Sorel-Tracy
Month	Jan	Feb	Mar	Apr	May	Jun	Jul	Aug	Sep	Oct	Nov	Dec	Year
Record high °C (°F)	12.8 (55.0)	12.0 (53.6)	21.1 (70.0)	30.5 (86.9)	34.4 (93.9)	37.8 (100.0)	36.7 (98.1)	37.8 (100.0)	33.9 (93.0)	28.9 (84.0)	22.8 (73.0)	14.4 (57.9)	37.8 (100.0)
Mean daily maximum °C (°F)	−6.1 (21.0)	−4.1 (24.6)	2.1 (35.8)	10.5 (50.9)	18.9 (66.0)	24.1 (75.4)	26.6 (79.9)	25.1 (77.2)	19.3 (66.7)	12.3 (54.1)	4.8 (40.6)	−2.8 (27.0)	10.9 (51.6)
Daily mean °C (°F)	−11.2 (11.8)	−9.2 (15.4)	−2.9 (26.8)	5.4 (41.7)	13.1 (55.6)	18.5 (65.3)	21.2 (70.2)	19.7 (67.5)	14.3 (57.7)	7.9 (46.2)	1 (34)	−7.3 (18.9)	5.9 (42.6)
Mean daily minimum °C (°F)	−16.2 (2.8)	−14.4 (6.1)	−7.9 (17.8)	0.3 (32.5)	7.2 (45.0)	12.8 (55.0)	15.7 (60.3)	14.3 (57.7)	9.3 (48.7)	3.5 (38.3)	−2.7 (27.1)	−11.7 (10.9)	0.9 (33.6)
Record low °C (°F)	−41.0 (−41.8)	−37.8 (−36.0)	−35.0 (−31.0)	−28.9 (−20.0)	−6.1 (21.0)	−1.7 (28.9)	4.4 (39.9)	0.0 (32.0)	−4.5 (23.9)	−10.6 (12.9)	−25.0 (−13.0)	−40.6 (−41.1)	−41.0 (−41.8)
Average precipitation mm (inches)	74.3 (2.93)	60.0 (2.36)	66.8 (2.63)	76.0 (2.99)	85.8 (3.38)	92.7 (3.65)	90.9 (3.58)	93.4 (3.68)	81.1 (3.19)	87.5 (3.44)	89.3 (3.52)	78.3 (3.08)	976.1 (38.43)
Source: Environment Canada

== Demographics ==
In the 2021 Census of Population conducted by Statistics Canada, Sorel-Tracy had a population of 35,165 living in 17,069 of its 17,749 total private dwellings, a change of 1.2% from its 2016 population of 34,755. With a land area of 57.28 km^{2} (22.12 sq mi), it had a population density of 613.9/km^{2} (1,590.0/sq mi) in 2021.

French Canadians make up more than 90% of the city's population. Less than 7% of the population is foreign-born or second generation immigrants. Anglo-Canadians make up less than 2% of Sorel-Tracy's inhabitants.

Population trend:

Census	Population	Change (%)
2021	35,165	▲1.2%
2016	34,755	▲0.4%
2011	34,600	▲1.5%
2006	34,076	▼0.3%
2001	34,194	N/A

Mother tongue language (2021)

Language	Population	Pct (%)
French only	33,220	96.2%
English only	375	1.1%
Both English & French	240	0.7%
Other languages	595	1.7%

== Sports ==
The city is home to the historic Colisée Cardin, an ice hockey arena built in 1954. The Sorel Éperviers played there from 1969 to 1977 and 1980–81. They advanced to the league final in 1974, losing the President's Cup (QMJHL) to the Quebec Remparts. Since the foundation of the LNAH (formerly QSPHL) in 1996, Sorel-Tracy has hosted a team for all but two seasons, 2008–2010. The team was known variously as Dinosaures, Mission, Royaux, GCI and HC Caverna before taking the name Sorel-Tracy Éperviers in 2012.

== Notable people ==
- François Beauchemin, ice hockey defenseman who last played for the Anaheim Ducks in the NHL, and who won the Stanley Cup with the Anaheim Ducks in 2007.
- Anthony Beauvillier, ice hockey left winger who plays for the Washington Capitals in the NHL. He was drafted by the New York Islanders 28th overall in 2015.
- Danic Champoux, documentary filmmaker
- Maryeve Dufault, racing driver
- Nicolas Aubé-Kubel, ice hockey right winger currently playing for the Buffalo Sabres in the National Hockey League. He won a Stanley Cup with the Colorado Avalanche in 2022.
- Marc-André Fleury, former goaltender who played for the Pittsburgh Penguins, Vegas Golden Knights, Chicago Blackhawks, and Minnesota Wild in the National Hockey League. He won three Stanley Cups with the Pittsburgh Penguins in 2009, 2016 and 2017
- Andre Gill, ice hockey goaltender
- Claude Lagacé, organist
- Pierre Mondou, ice hockey centre who won 3 Stanley Cups with the Montreal Canadiens in 1977, 1978, and 1979
- Jean Morin, retired ice hockey linesman
- Pierre Paquette, politician and member of the Bloc Québécois, a Canadian political party
- LuFisto, professional wrestler
- Monique Régimbald-Zeiber, painter

== See also ==
- Battle of Sorel
- List of cities in Quebec
