= Pierre de Saurel =

French military officer and seigneur in New France

Pierre de Saurel (1626–1682) was a captain in France's Carignan-Salières Regiment and later a seigneur in New France. He was with the Carignan-Salières in 1665 when it was sent to New France to protect the colony from the Iroquois. When the regiment returned to France in 1668, Saurel remained behind and was granted a seigneury at the mouth of the Richelieu River, now the site of the city of Sorel-Tracy in Quebec, Canada.

== Military career ==
Saurel, the son of Mathieu de Saurel and Jeanne de Girard was baptized at Grenoble, Dauphiné, France on December 26, 1626. His father was a lawyer. It is not known when Saurel became a military officer but by 1665 he was a captain and company commander in the Carignan-Salières Regiment. The Carignan-Salières was formed in 1659 by the merger of two existing regiments: the Carignan, raised in 1644 by Thomas-François de Savoie, Prince of Carignan, and the Salières (formerly the Balthasar Regiment), raised by Johann Balthasar de Gachéo during the Thirty Years' War.

Early in 1665, the Carignan-Salières received orders to deploy overseas to New France. The struggling colony had recently become a royal province but was threatened by the Mohawk, the easternmost of the five Iroquois nations. The regiment marched from northeastern France to the Atlantic coast and arrived at the port city of La Rochelle at the beginning of April.

The first four companies of the regiment left La Rochelle for New France in mid-April. The next eight companies, including Saurel’s, sailed on May 13. Before boarding they were inspected by Jean Talon, the newly appointed Intendant of New France. Talon praised Saurel’s company, writing that it was “much better than the others in terms of weapons and clothing.” He recommended that an award of 15 to 20 pistoles (Spanish gold coins) be given to Saurel. Saurel’s company sailed aboard La Paix and arrived at Quebec on August 19, 1665.

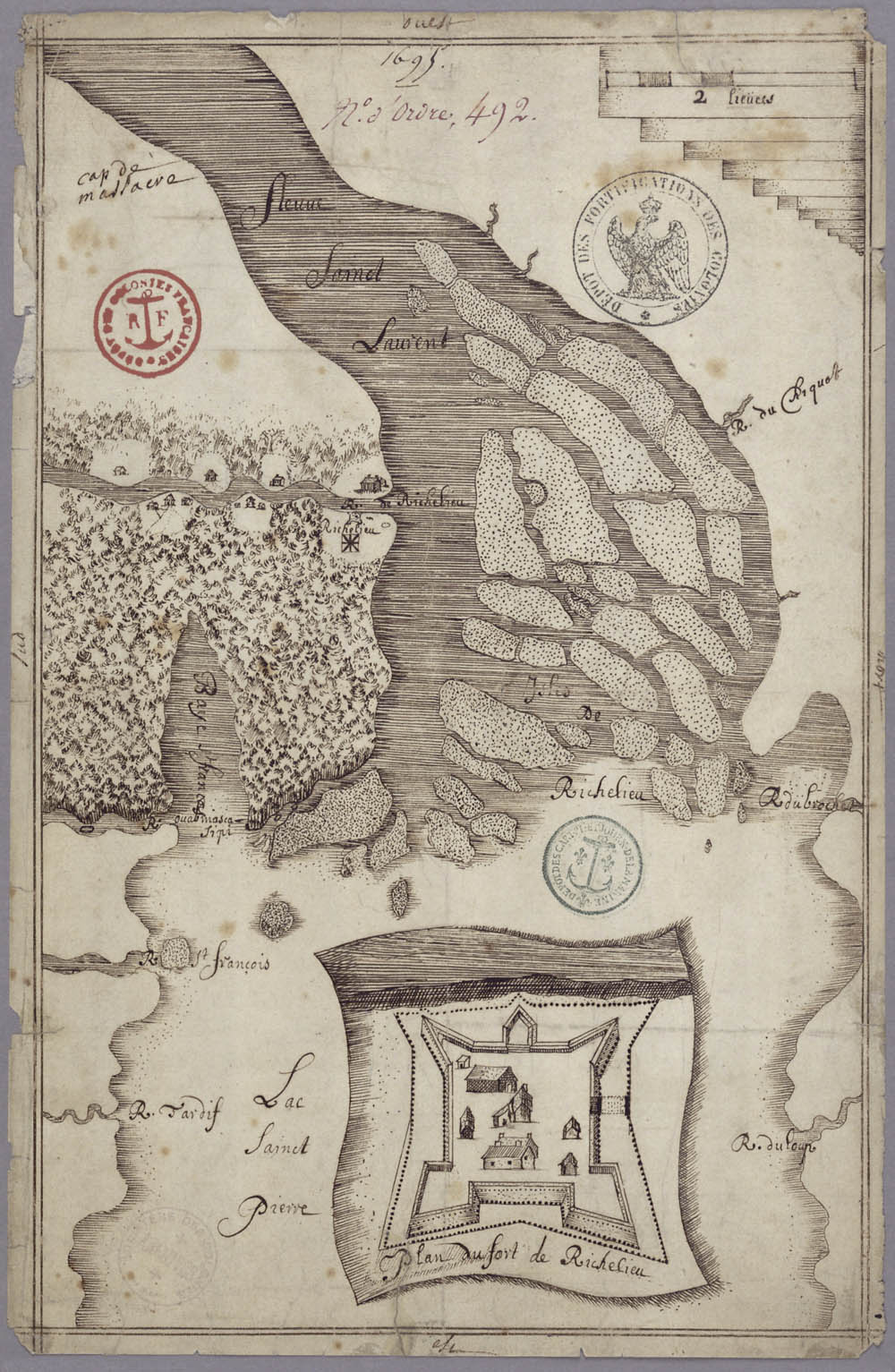
Fort Richelieu in 1695.

Six days after his arrival, Saurel was tasked with rebuilding of Fort Richelieu. A fort at the confluence of the Richelieu River and the St. Lawrence River had been built in 1641 by Charles Huault de Montmagny but had been abandoned in 1646 and burned by the Mohawk in 1647. Fort Richelieu was one of five forts constructed by the Carignan-Salières astride the route that the Mohawk used to attack settlements on the St. Lawrence. It was later renamed Fort Sorel. Saurel wintered at the fort, and foreseeing future settlement, had his men clear a large amount of the surrounding forest.

In July 1666, the Lieutenant Général of the Americas, Alexandre de Prouville de Tracy, ordered Saurel to lead a punitive expedition against the Mohawk in retaliation for an attack against a hunting party on Isle La Motte that killed seven soldiers and captured four including Tracy's cousin, Lieutenant Louis de Canchy de Lerole. Two days away from the nearest Mohawk village, Saurel encountered a delegation who were returning the four unharmed prisoners to New France. Saurel refused his Algonquin allies' demand that the Mohawk be turned over to them. He ordered his men to turn back and escorted the delegation to Quebec.

Saurel’s company participated in Tracy’s large-scale expedition against the Mohawk later that year. The expedition razed four villages which the Mohawk had hastily abandoned and destroyed their stores of food. A peace settlement with the Mohawk was reached the following year.

In 1667, two of Saurel’s men were arrested for theft and counterfeiting. Jean Sendil was imprisoned for three years while the other, Desrochers, was hanged on June 28, 1667.

== Seigneur in New France ==
Before the Carignan-Salières returned to France in 1668, the officers and men of the regiment were given the opportunity to remain in New France as settlers. Because he had been an officer, Saurel was granted a seigneury centered on Fort Richelieu. As seigneur, Saurel was responsible for recruiting habitants to clear and farm the land. 29 members of his company settled on the land of their captain, joined by four others whose officers had returned to France.

In October 1668, Saurel married Catherine, daughter of Charles Legardeur de Tilly. Inside Fort Richelieu he built a square timber manor house, a windmill of field stone, a stable, two barns and a sheepfold. A chapel dedicated to St. Pierre was built in 1670, and in 1672, Saurel was officially granted title to the seigneury.

Saurel had no training as a farmer nor did many of his men. Many of them were reluctant to received an alloment of land for which they would pay an annual rent to Saurel, preferring instead to work for wages. By 1681 only 10 of the original 33 still held land under Saurel. Some had returned to their former trades, some had become coureur des bois and a few had returned to France. In 1681 the seigneury had a population of 118 with roughly 400 acres under cultivation. The inhabitants included farmers, shoemakers, carpenters, a ropemaker, tanner, miller, edge-tool maker, cooper, and a surgeon.

To supplement the income from his seigneury, Saurel became involved in both the timber trade and the fur trade. He received a contract from Talon to supply oak and pine planks for ships being built at Quebec, however, this did not continue after the intendant returned to France in 1672. In 1681, Saurel became a partner in the Compagnie de la Baie du Nord, a business venture headed by Charles Aubert de La Chesnaye that sought to challenge the supremacy of the Hudson’s Bay Company in Hudson Bay. He accompanied Pierre-Esprit Radisson and Médard Chouart des Groseilliers on an expedition to Hudson’s Bay in the summer of 1682 that captured Fort Nelson and seized a ship carrying furs bound for Boston.

Saurel died suddenly in Montreal on November 26, 1682, and was buried there two days later. He was heavily in debt when he died having mortgaged his seigneury several years earlier. His widow, Catherine, successfully avoided foreclosure and eviction until February 1713 when the seigneury was awarded to the Governor of Montreal, Claude de Ramezay.

== Legacy ==
Sorel, the fourth-oldest city in the province of Quebec, is named after Pierre de Saurel. In 2001, the city amalgamated with the city of Tracy located on the opposite side of the Richelieu River. In 2009, the Le Bas-Richelieu Regional Municipality was renamed the Pierre-De Saurel Regional County Municipality. Several cities in the Province of Quebec including Montreal have streets named after Saurel.
