= Fort Richelieu =

Coordinates: 46°02′48″N 73°06′57″W

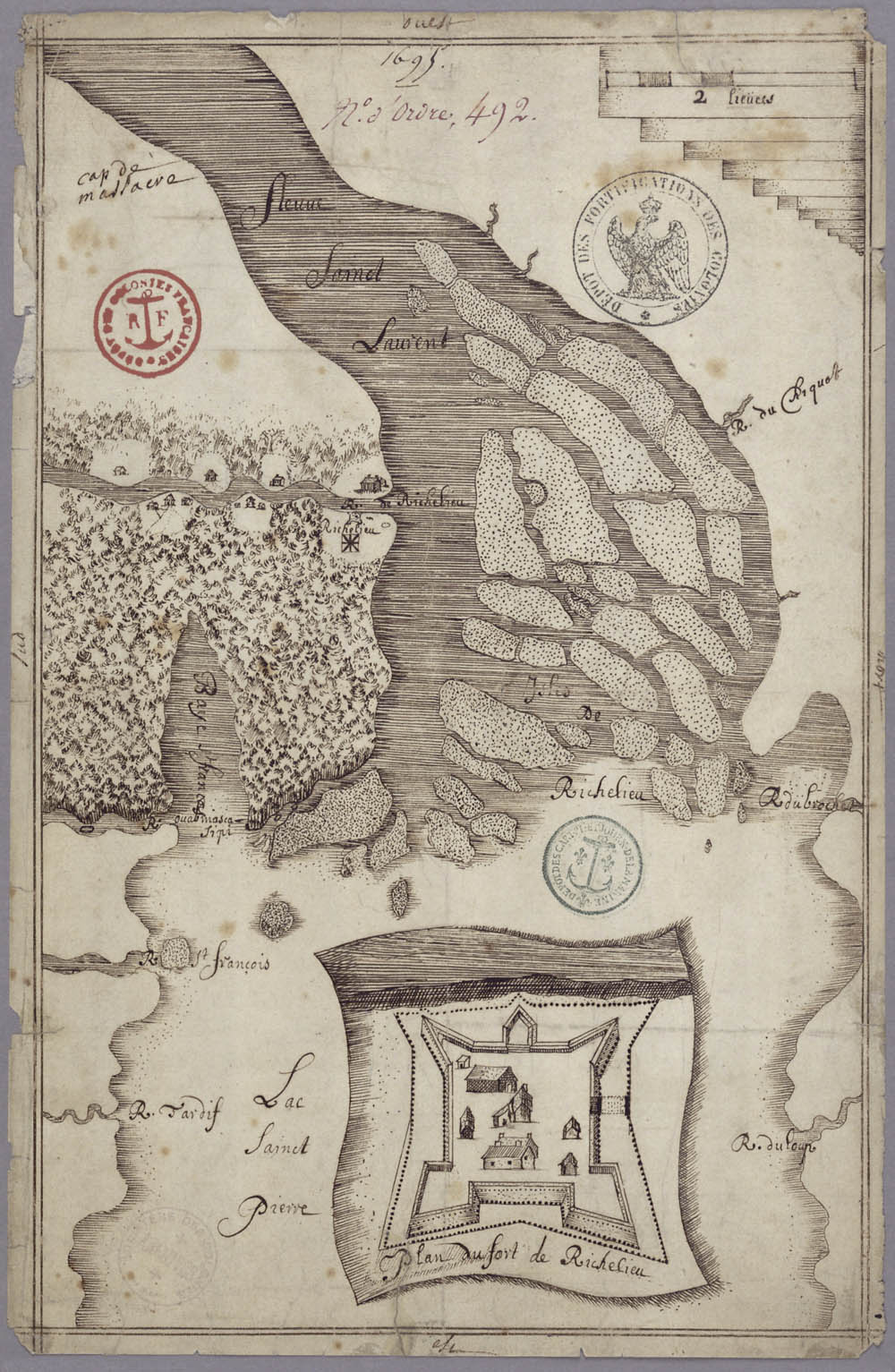
- Established: 1641
- Location: Sorel-Tracy, Quebec, Canada.

National Historic Site of Canada
- Official name: Fort Richelieu National Historic Site of Canada
- Designated: 1923

Fort Richelieu is a historic fort in La Vallée-du-Richelieu Regional County Municipality, Quebec, Canada. The fort is designated as a National Historic Site of Canada. Fort Richelieu was part of a series of five forts built along the Richelieu River and is at the mouth of the Richelieu River. Fort Chambly formerly known as Fort St. Louis at Chambly, Fort Sainte-Thérèse, and Fort Saint-Jean at Saint-Jean-sur-Richelieu, are on the way. Fort Sainte Anne (Vermont) on Isle La Motte, Vermont in Lake Champlain is near its source. The forts were built in order to protect travellers on the river from the Iroquois. The region is informally known as la Vallée-des-Forts.

== History ==
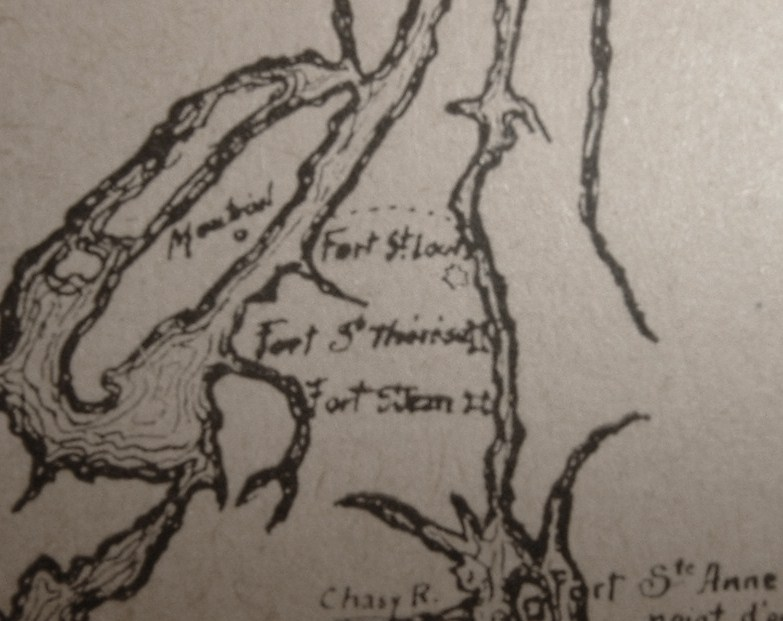
Map of Fort Saint-Jean and other forts on the Richelieu River circa 1666 for the campaign of the Regiment of Carignan-Salières

The fort was established at the mouth of the Richelieu River, near the modern city of Sorel-Tracy, in 1641. It was built by Charles Huault de Montmagny, first Governor and Lieutenant-Governor of New France, and named in honour of Cardinal Richelieu, chief minister to Louis XIII. The fort was burned down by the Iroquois in 1647. In 1665, the Carignan-Salières Regiment, under the direction of Pierre de Saurel, rebuilt the fort on the same site.

== Affiliations ==
The museum is affiliated with Canadian Museums Association, Canadian Heritage Information Network and Virtual Museum of Canada.

== See also ==
List of French forts in North America
