= Carignan-Salières Regiment =

17th century French military unit active in New France

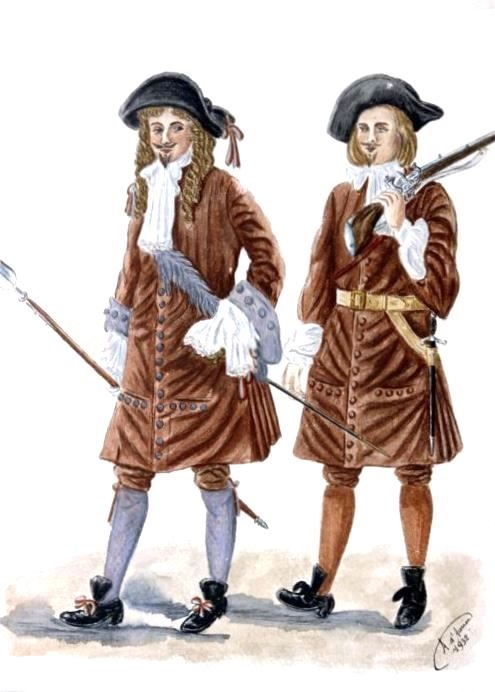
- An officer and soldier of the Carignan-Salières Regiment in 1665
- Active: 1659 to 1676
- Country: France
- Branch: French Royal Army
- Type: Infantry
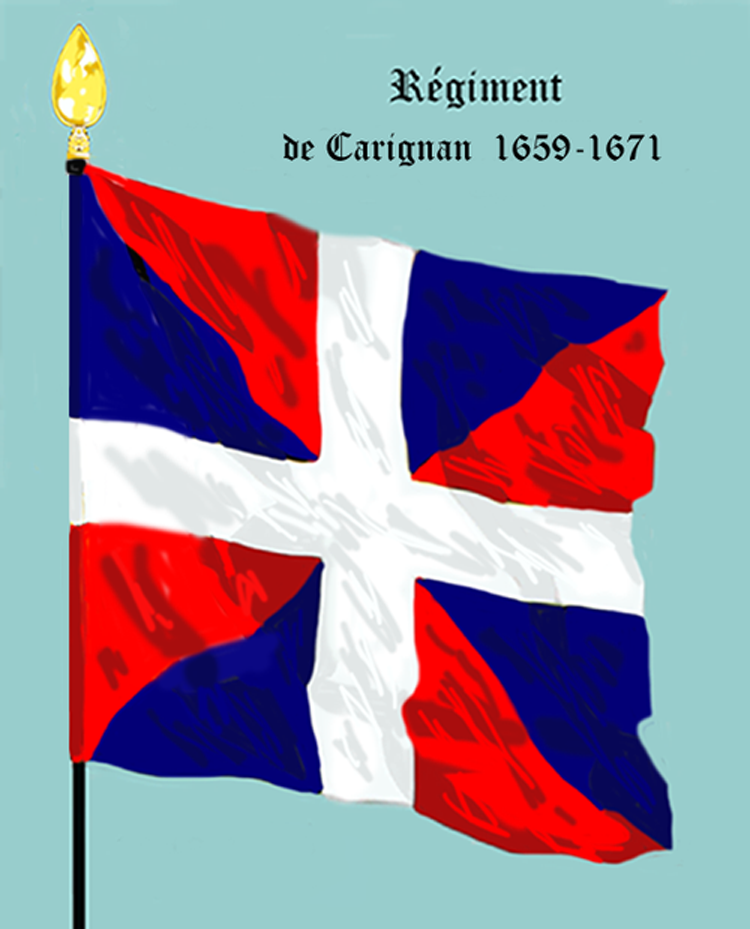
- Colours

Commanders
- Notable commanders: Henri de Chastelard de Salières

The Carignan-Salières Regiment was a 17th-century French military unit formed by the merging of two other regiments in 1659. Approximately 1,100 men from the regiment were sent to New France in 1665 to deal with the threat of the Haudenosaunee (Iroquois) to the colony. While in New France they were under the command of the Lieutenant Général of the Americas, Alexandre de Prouville de Tracy; the Governor General, Daniel de Rémy de Courcelle; and their colonel, Henri de Chastelard de Salières. The regiment constructed fortifications along the Richelieu River, and took part in three expeditions against the Haudenosaunee in 1666. A peace settlement was reached the following year. Roughly 400 officers and soldiers remained behind in New France as settlers when the regiment returned to France in 1668.

== Early history ==
The Carignan-Salières Regiment was the result of the merger of the Carignan Regiment with the Salières Regiment in 1659. The Carignan Regiment was raised in Piedmont in 1644 during the Franco-Spanish War by Thomas Francis of Savoy, Prince of Carignano. Until the 1659 Treaty of the Pyrenees ended the war, the regiment served with the French Army as an auxiliary unit. While the prince was the proprietary colonel, command of the regiment was assigned to a mestre de camp whom the prince appointed.

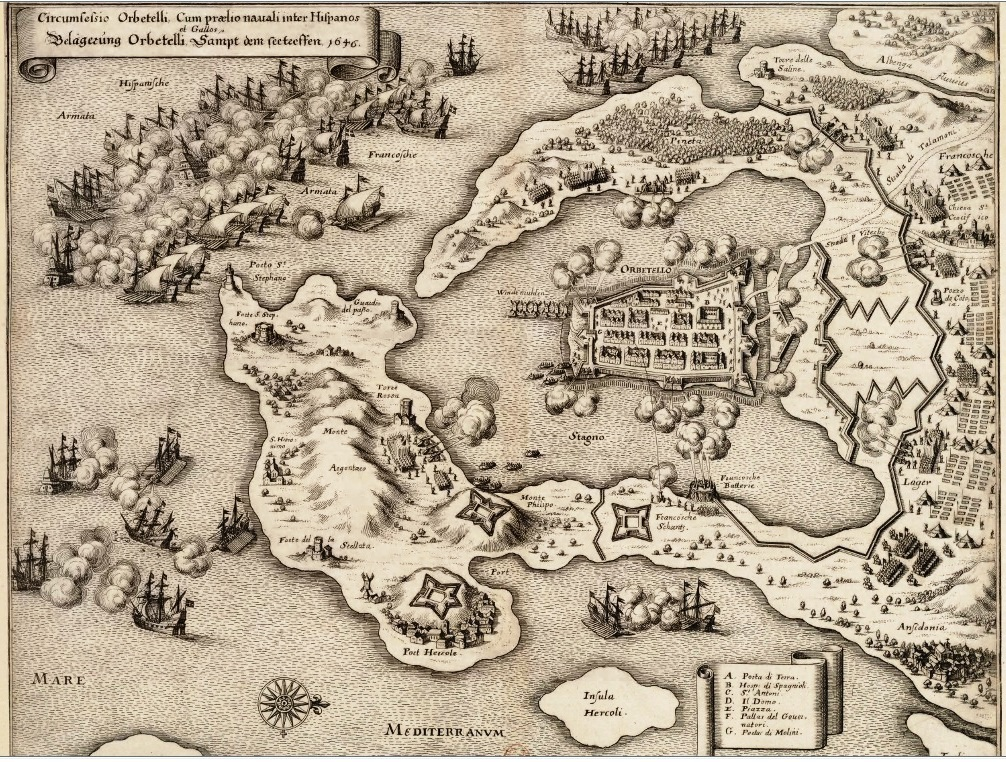
The Blockade of Orbetello, 1646, engraving by Matthäus Merian the Elder

In 1645, the regiment participated in the siege of Vigevano in Lombardy, and in the engagement at La Morra in Piedmont. The following year it took part in the expedition against the Spanish-controlled town of Orbetello in Tuscany. The regiment sailed from Genoa aboard the French fleet commanded by the Marquis of Brézé. The regiment disembarked at the harbour of Talamone, and was present at the capture of Forte delle Saline. It faced strong resistance at the foot of Monte Argentario, and withdrew to Piedmont after Spanish reinforcements relieved the siege of Orbetello.

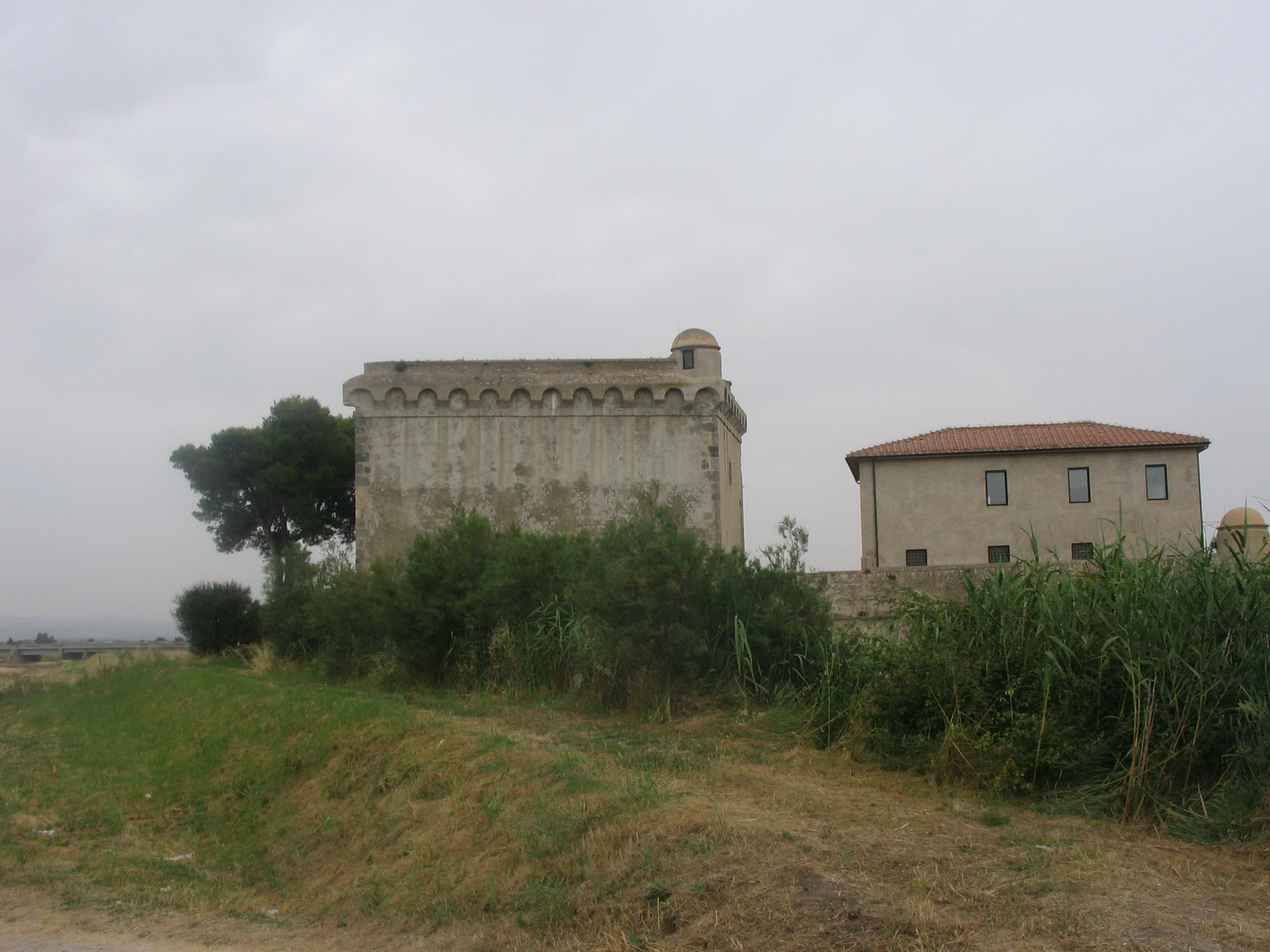
Forte delle Saline was a Spanish fortification north of Orbetello in Tuscany

When French regiments were recalled to France during the civil wars known as the Fronde, the Carignan Regiment crossed the Alps and served in Guyenne. It was part of the royalist army commanded by the Viscount of Turenne that fought at the Battle of the Faubourg St Antoine in July 1652. The regiment returned to Piedmont in 1653, and in the summer of 1655 took part in the unsuccessful siege of Pavia in the Duchy of Milan.

Following the death of Prince Thomas in 1656, his son Prince Emmanuel Philibert became proprietary colonel. Two years later the prince ceded the regiment to the French crown as he could no longer afford to maintain it. When the Treaty of the Pyrenees ended the war with Spain, the regiment was reduced in strength to ten companies and merged with the Salières Regiment (formerly the Balthazard Regiment). The Balthazard had been raised in Germany near the beginning of the Thirty Years War by Johann von Balthazard. Balthazard retired in 1658 and turned over command to Henri de Chastelard de Salières, who was subsequently given command of the merged regiment. The Carignan-Salières spent the next several years in garrison along the northeastern frontier of France.

== Crisis in New France ==
Founded by Samuel de Champlain in 1608, New France began as a proprietary colony granted by the Crown to a succession of merchant companies. In 1627, following the failure of the Compagnie de Montmorency to fulfill its contractual obligations, control of New France was granted by Louis XIII to the Company of One Hundred Associates, founded by Cardinal Richelieu.

In 1649, during the Beaver Wars, the Haudenosaunee invaded Wendake (Huronia), the homeland of New France's allies the Wendat (Huron). The Haudenosaunee wanted to expand their hunting grounds, increase their population through the adoption of captives, and control the fur trade with New France. The disruption of the fur trade brought the Haudenosaunee into conflict with the French as it was through the Wendat that the Odawa and Ojibwe traded furs to the French. Significant raids on the French settlements in the St. Lawrence River valley began in the early 1650s. Haudenosaunee war parties blockaded the St. Lawrence and Ottawa Rivers, intercepted canoes bringing furs to Montreal, and took numerous captives.

In 1660, the total population of New France was 3,035, of which 1,928 were considered adults. There were about 900 people living in Quebec and about 200 each in Montreal and Trois-Rivières, with the rest spread out in small settlements along the St. Lawrence. Almost two-thirds of the population were male. The Company of One Hundred Associates had tried to fulfill the terms of its charter to bring settlers to New France; however, many of the inhabitants were indentured laborers who left after their three-to-five-year contracts expired. The harsh winters, the shortage of women, and the threat of being carried off by the Haudenosaunee led to very few wanting to stay. As a result, New France lacked the manpower to effectively counter the Haudenosaunee.

Throughout the struggle, the authorities in New France sent desperate appeals for help to Paris, only to be told that France was fully engaged in a war with Spain and there were no soldiers to spare. Additionally, France was caught up in the Fronde and it was therefore impossible to send a force across the Atlantic. Even after the Treaty of the Pyrenees ended the war with Spain in 1659, the Crown remained indifferent to New France. Pierre Boucher, the governor of Trois-Rivières, visited Paris in 1661 to plead for help, saying that people in Trois-Rivières were afraid to hunt lest they be carried off by the Haudenosaunee, only to be politely told that the responsibility of the defence of New France rested with the Company of One Hundred Associates not the Crown. In 1663, however, Louis XIV asked the Company of One Hundred Associates to relinquish its charter, and declared New France a royal province under his direct rule.

The decision to make New France a royal province was as much, if not more, motivated by mercantile ambitions than pleas for help. Louis XIV's influential finance minister, Jean-Baptiste Colbert, advised the king that revenues from the fur trade could be used to finance plans to push France to its "natural frontiers" in Europe. But if New France was to have a thriving fur trade and a self-sustaining economy, the Haudenosaunee "menace" had to be addressed.

Louis XIV and Colbert took several steps to ensure the survival of New France. Alexandre de Prouville de Tracy was commissioned Lieutenant Général of the Americas and tasked with ending the Haudenosaunee threat. Daniel de Remy de Courcelle was appointed Governor General to replace Augustin de Saffray de Mézy, and Jean Talon was appointed Intendant. In a 1664 letter to Bishop Laval, Colbert wrote: "His Majesty has resolved to send a good regiment of infantry at the end of the year, or in the month of February next, in order to destroy these barbarians completely".

== Arrival in New France ==
The Carignan-Salières Regiment marched across France to La Rochelle on the Atlantic coast. Each of the twenty companies had a nominal strength of 50 men and three officers; however, many were understrength. At La Rochelle, men from eight companies that were overstrength were transferred to the understrength companies. Other men were recruited from young men looking for free passage to New France or from the surplus of workman that had been hired for the colony.

Seven ships were required to transport the regiment and its equipment to New France. The first, carrying four companies, departed La Rochelle on 19 April 1665 and arrived at Quebec on 19 June 1665. Four companies from other regiments that had been with Tracy in Martinique arrived with the Lieutenant Général on 30 June 1665. These companies were attached to, but never formally integrated into, the Carignan-Salières. Salières and eight companies arrived in mid-August. The last two transports with Courcelle, Talon and eight companies sailed on 25 May 1665 but did not arrive until mid-September. 35 men aboard the two ships had died during the voyage while 130 were hospitalized upon arrival suffering from scurvy, typhus or cholera. 20 did not survive. The regiment's supply ship depart La Rochelle on 22 June 1665 and arrived at Quebec on 12 September. The ships that brought the Carignan-Salières Regiment to New France were as follows:

Ship	Date of arrival at Quebec	Companies carried
Le Joyeux Siméon	19 June 1665	Chambly, Froment, La Tour, Petit
Le Brézé	30 June 1665	La Durantaye (Chambellé), Berthier (L'Allier), La Brisardière (Orléans), Monteil (Poitou)
L'Aigle d'Or	18 August 1665	Grandfontaine, La Fredière, La Motte, Salières
La Paix	19 August 1665	La Colonelle, Contrecœur, Maximy, Saurel
Le Jardin de Hollande	12 September 1665	Supply ship
Le Saint-Sébastien	12 September 1665	Rougemont, Boisbriand, Des Portes, Varenne
La Justice	14 September 1665	La Fouille, Laubia, Saint-Ours, Naurois

Almost immediately after their arrival many of the companies were dispatched to the Richelieu River valley to begin construction of fortifications. Companies were also sent to garrison Montreal and Trois-Rivières.

== Reception in New France ==
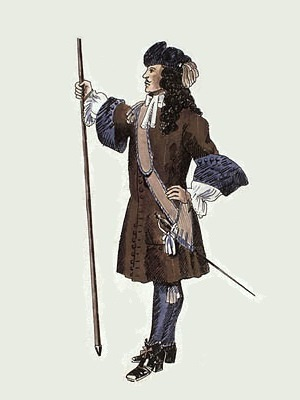
Officer of the Carignan-Salières Regiment.

The soldiers of the Carignan-Salières were welcomed as saviours. Marie de l'Incarnation, head of the Ursuline convent, wrote of their arrival:

The ships have all arrived, bringing us the rest of the army, along with the most eminent persons whom the king has sent to the aid of the country," she wrote." They feared they would all perish in the storms they braved on their voyage...we are helping them to understand that this is a holy war, where the only things that matter are the glory of God and the salvation of souls.

Although Marie de l'Incarnation viewed them as saviours, modern-day scholars like Jack Verney argue that their mission, contrary to what she states, was "a secular rather than sacred one" since Louis XIV and Colbert expected that the regiment would ensure that the colony became a source of revenue for the Crown.

In Montreal, the Sulpician priest, François Dollier de Casson, reacted to the soldiers negatively, saying that "vices which have, in fact, risen and grown here since that time along with many other troubles and misfortunes which had not up to that time made their appearance here". In Verney's view, this is a much more realistic account given how the men had "marked their progress along the road to La Rochelle with outbreaks of disorder and indiscipline".

== Fort building ==
The arrival of the Carignan-Salières in the summer of 1665 temporarily increased the population of New France by more than a quarter. To avoid overcrowding at Quebec, Tracy dispatched four of the companies to the Richelieu River shortly after his arrival. Their task was to construct a series of wooden forts along the main Haudenosaunee invasion route. Other companies of the regiment were dispatched almost as soon as they disembarked. Fort St. Louis (now known as Fort Chambly) was completed first followed by Fort Saint-Jean and Fort Sainte Thérèse. Fort Richelieu at the confluence of the Richelieu and St. Lawrence Rivers was restored, and Fort Sainte Anne was built on Isle La Motte at the northern end of Lake Champlain the following spring. The forts were used as advance bases for the three expeditions against the Mohawk in 1666, and served to deter Indigenous raids and possible English attacks.

== Campaigns ==
=== First expedition ===
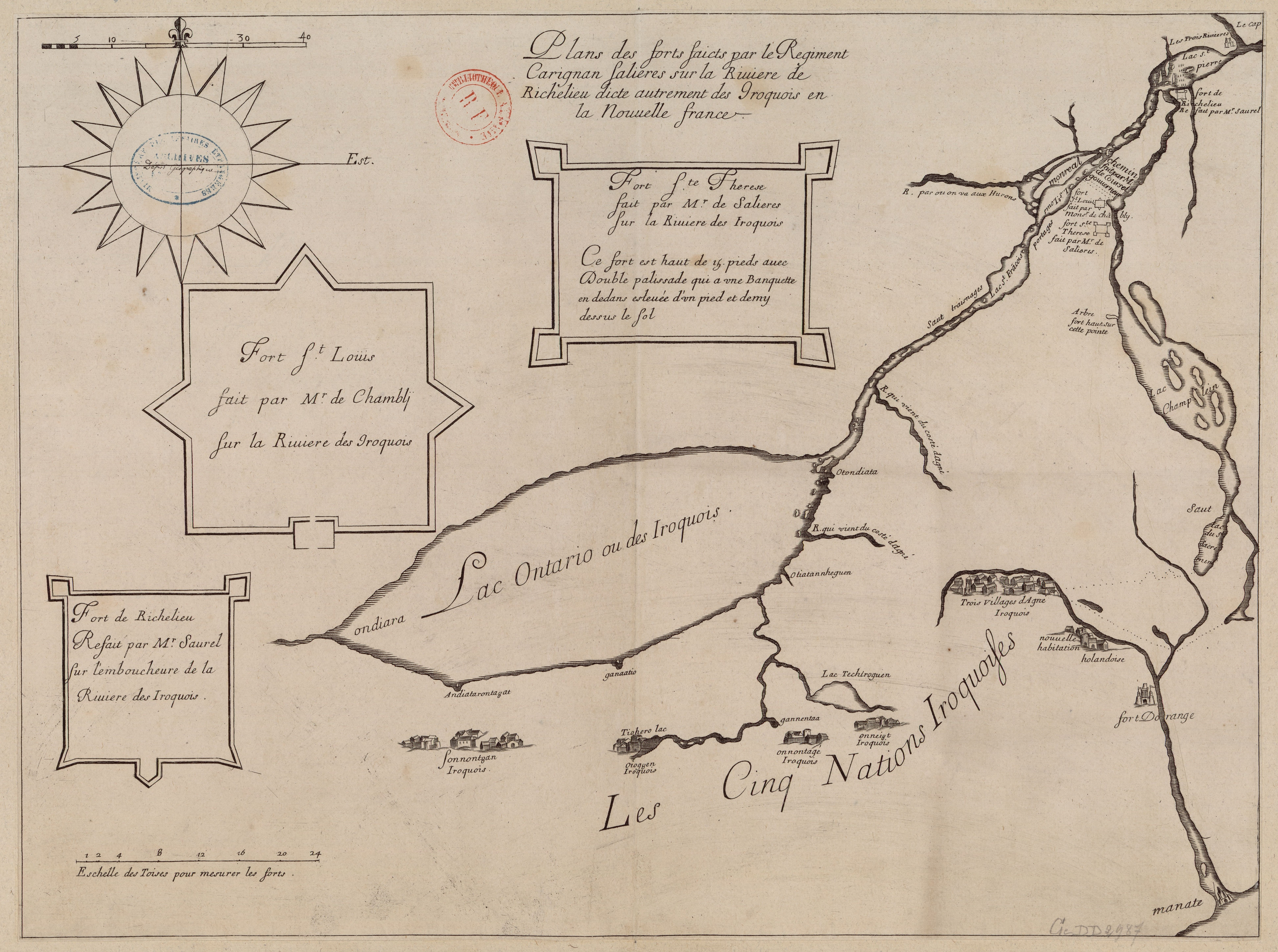
Plans of the forts made by the Carignan-Salières Regiment on the Richelieu River.

The first of the regiment's campaigns took place in the winter of 1666. The expedition against the Mohawk was initiated by Courcelle and approved by Tracy. Tracy recognized that the Mohawk, the easternmost of the five Haudenosaunee nations, were the most aggressive towards the French. In December 1665, an Onondaga and Oneida delegation arrived at Quebec to begin negotiations on behalf of themselves and the Seneca and Cayuga. Although the western Haudenosaunee nations appeared willing to discuss peace, the Mohawk did not.

Salières recognized that a winter campaign would not succeed without basic necessities such as snowshoes, winter clothing and cooking equipment. He thought the expedition was doomed to failure as his men were ill-equipped to operate in the cold and deep snow. In his memoirs he wrote:

When I understood and saw the state our soldiers were in for this enterprise, I saw all things ill disposed, the soldiers having no snowshoes, very few axes, a single blanket, no equipment for the ice and having only one pair of moccasins and stockings. When I saw all this, I said to the captains that it would require one of God's miracles for any good to come of this. Some of them replied that M. le gouverneur [Courcelle] did as he pleased and took advice from no one.

300 French regulars and 200 Canadien volunteers rendezvoused at Fort St. Louis in early January. Algonquin guides were to meet the expedition there, however, after waiting several weeks, Courcelle set off without them on 30 January 1666. As a result, the expedition frequently lost their way. Provisions became scarce, and the men suffered greatly from frostbite, hypothermia and exhaustion. The expedition eventually came across a few cabins on the outskirts of the Anglo-Dutch settlement of Schenectady. Courcelle assumed they belonged to the Mohawk and ordered an attack. The cabins were ransacked. Three of the occupants were killed and a number were captured. The sound of gunfire attracted the attention of a party of Mohawk who had been at Schenectady to trade. The French and Mohawk skirmished which caused the deaths of one officer, five soldiers and one volunteer as well as four Mohawk.

Schenectady's leader, Arent van Curler, arrived on the scene and informed Courcelle that his expedition had strayed into English territory. Courcelle negotiated for the purchase of provisions and care for the wounded. He turned his prisoners over to Van Curler and ordered the expedition back to Fort St. Louis.

The Jesuit Relations record that over 60 men died from hunger during the expedition, while Captain Francois de Tapie de Monteil of the Poitou Regiment wrote in his journal that "we lost 400 men who dropped dead from cold."

=== Second expedition ===
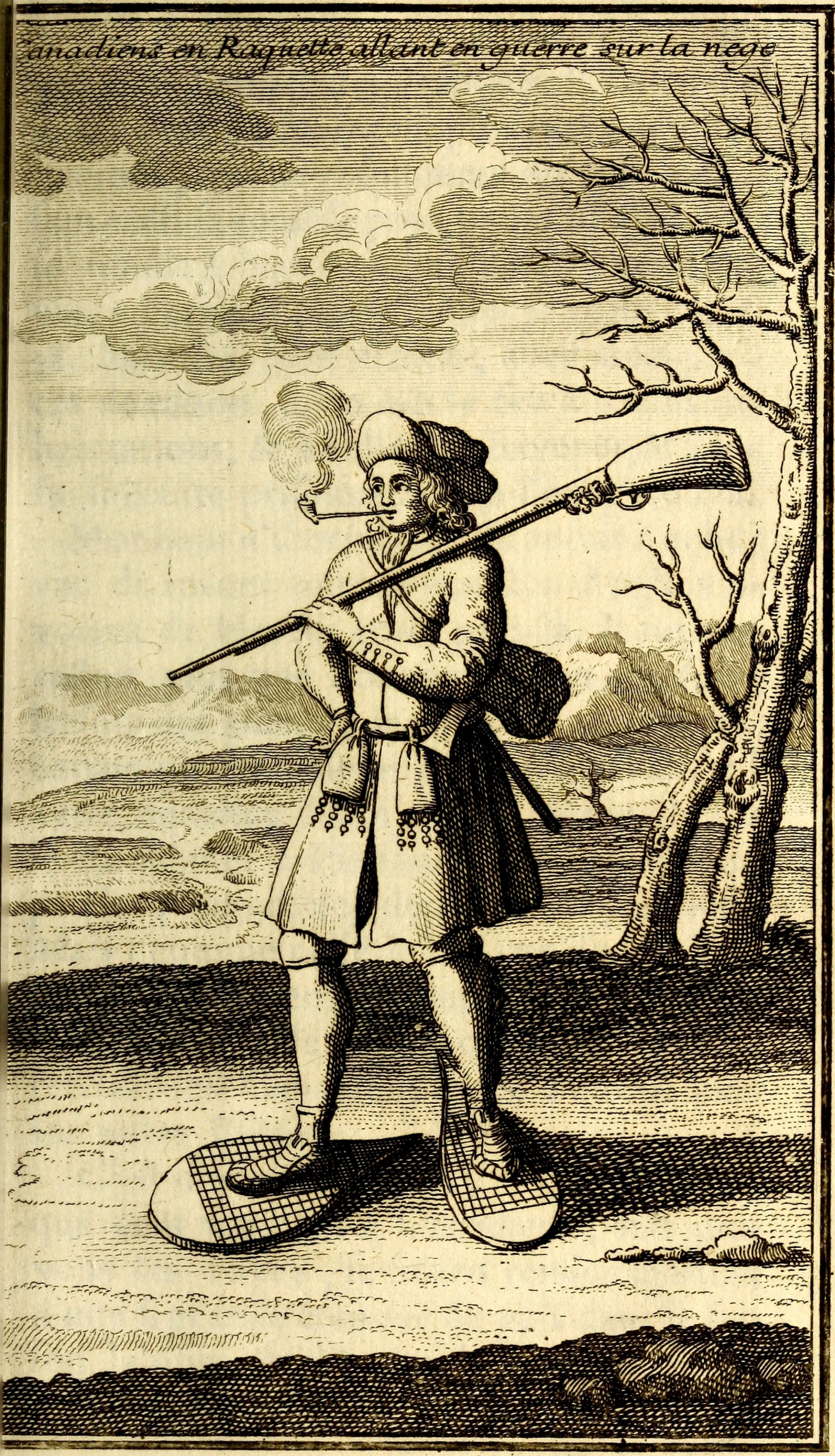
Soldier in winter outfit with snowshoes.

In July 1666, news arrived at Quebec that a hunting party on Isle La Motte had been ambushed by the Mohawk. Seven soldiers were killed and four others taken captive including Tracy's cousin, Lieutenant Louis de Canchy de Lerole. Captain Pierre de Saurel of the Carignan-Salières was tasked with leading 200 men in a retaliatory strike against the Mohawk. The expedition was two days' march from Mohawk territory when they encountered a delegation led by the warrior known as the Flemish Bastard, who was bringing the unharmed French prisoners back to Fort Sainte Anne. The expedition turned back, and Saurel escorted the Mohawk delegation to Quebec.

=== Third expedition ===
The regiment's third campaign against the Mohawk was led by Tracy. 600 soldiers, 600 Canadien volunteers, and 100 Algonquin and Wendat warriors gathered at Fort Sainte Anne in the early fall of 1666. The first of three contingents set out on 29 September. The main body departed on 3 October followed by the rear guard four days later. The expedition crossed Lake Champlain and Lake George (then called Lac du Saint Sacrement) in canoes and bateaux, then marched overland to reach the Mohawk villages in mid-October. All four villages had been hastily abandoned. The Mohawk, faced with Tracy's overwhelming force, had elected not to engage the French in battle. On 17 October 1666, the French symbolically claimed the four villages and surrounding territory in the name of Louis XIV. After burning the villages, the expedition returned to Fort Sainte Anne. The only casualties were eight men who drowned when their canoes overturned on Lake Champlain during a storm.

The expedition was considered a success despite not having inflicting a military defeat on the enemy. A peace settlement with the Mohawk was reached in July 1667 when they brought several families to Quebec to serve as hostages and asked for Jesuit missionaries to be sent to their homeland. Without the threat of Haudenosaunee raids the colony entered a period of growth and prosperity that lasted until 1684.

== Religion ==
Although the Edict of Nantes in 1598 granted the minority Calvinists (also known as Huguenots) substantial rights, they were not permitted to settle in New France. The Roman Catholic Church played a major role in administering the colony with the Jesuits wielding considerable influence. When Bishop François de Laval discovered that there were significant numbers of Huguenots as well as unconfirmed Catholics within the ranks of the Carignan-Salières, corrective measures were taken. The Huguenots were coerced into recanting their faith, and Jesuit Father Claude Dablon gave two emergency sermons within five days of Tracy's arrival in New France to prepare those who needed to be confirmed or readmitted into the Catholic faith.

== Equipment ==
The Carignan-Salières Regiment was dressed for "efficiency rather than looks". The soldiers wore grey-lined brown coats, brown leather boots, and a wide-brimmed felt slouch hat that shielded the face from rain. The Carignan-Salières were one of the first French regiments to wear a standardized uniform. Most of the soldiers carried matchlock muskets, however, 200 of the new flintlock muskets with bayonets were issued before departing La Rochelle, as well as 100 flintlock pistols. The flintlock had increased reliability, a higher rate of fire, and the ability to be fired without the use of an external flame. Black powder was carried in wooden powder flasks or a powder horn. In cold weather the soldiers wore fur hats, moccasins, leggings and blanket coats. Officers wore a white sash with their uniform and carried a half-pike as a symbol of their authority. Both officers and soldiers carried rapiers.

== Departure and settlement in Canada ==
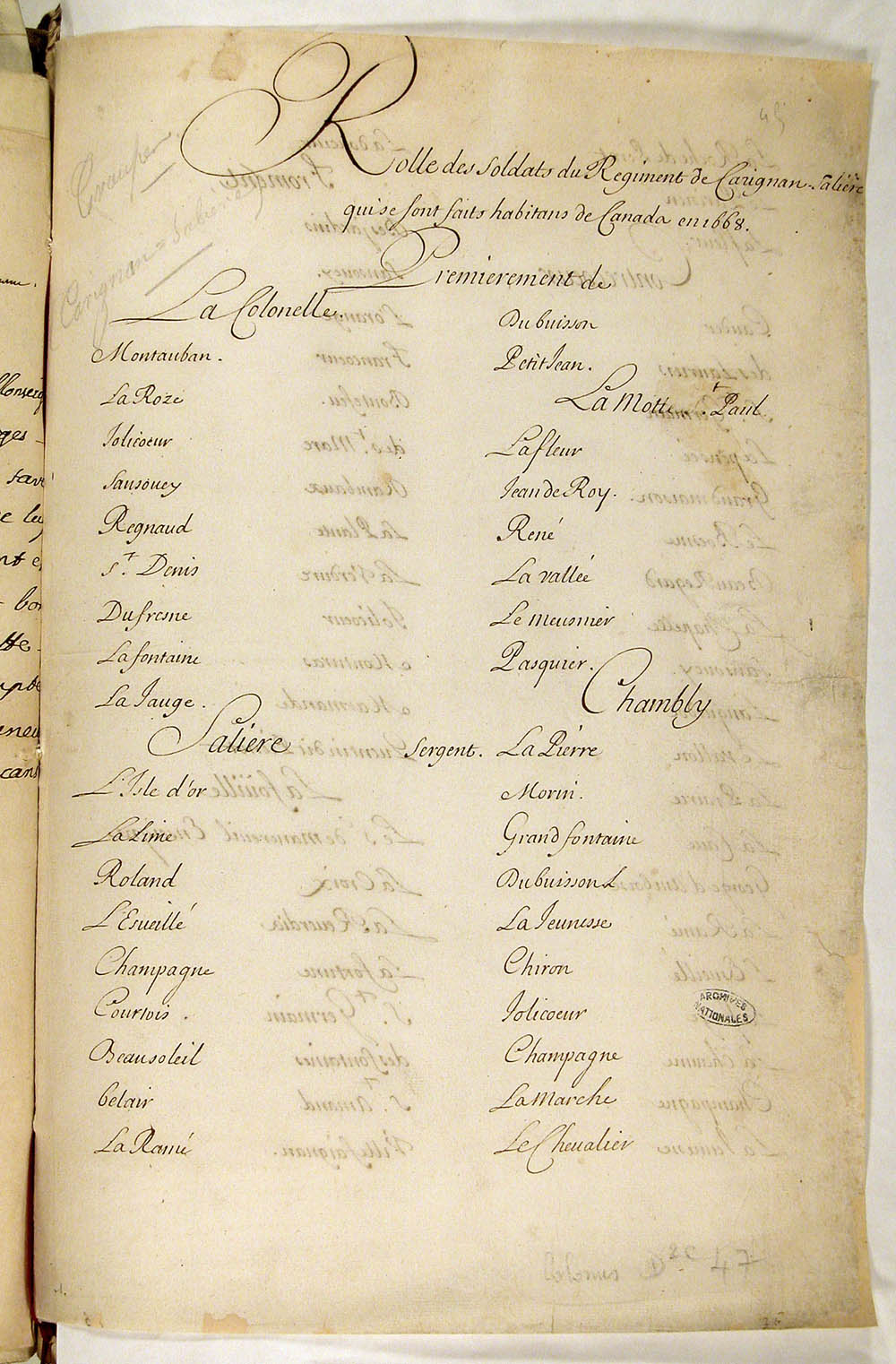
Roll of Soldiers of the Carignan-Salières Regiment who became inhabitants of Canada in 1668.

With the end to the Haudenosaunee threat, King Louis XIV and Colbert decided to offer the men of the regiment the opportunity to remain in New France to help increase the population. As incentive, ordinary soldiers were offered either 100 livres or 50 livres and a year's worth of rations. Sergeants, were offered either 150 livres or 100 livres and a year's worth of rations. Officers were offered land grants in the forms of seigneuries. This offer was particularly beneficial to such men as Pierre de Saurel, Alexandre Berthier, Antoine Pécaudy de Contrecœur, and François Jarret de Verchères, who were granted seigneuries along the Richelieu River.

The granting of seigneurial tenure to officers who wished to remain in New France served an ulterior purpose. The properties granted to Contrecœur and Pierre de Saurel, for example, were placed in strategic areas that could be used as a buffer against the Haudenosaunee and English. These newly created seigneurs rented land to former members of their companies, thus creating a cadre of veterans in strategic areas.

Although the majority of the regiment returned to France in 1668, about 450 remained behind to settle in Canada. These men were encouraged to marry. Many of them married the young women known as Les Filles du Roi. This term is used to refer to the approximately 800 young French women who emigrated to New France between 1663 and 1673 as part of a program sponsored by King Louis XIV to increase the population. The women, the majority of whom were impoverished orphans but of good character, were provided with free passage, a trousseau, and a dowry of 50 livres.

The French had a practice of giving noms de guerre (nicknames) to their soldiers. Many of these nicknames gradually became the official surnames of the soldiers who elected to remain in New France when their service expired. These names are also reflected in the names of cities and towns throughout the region.

== Later history ==
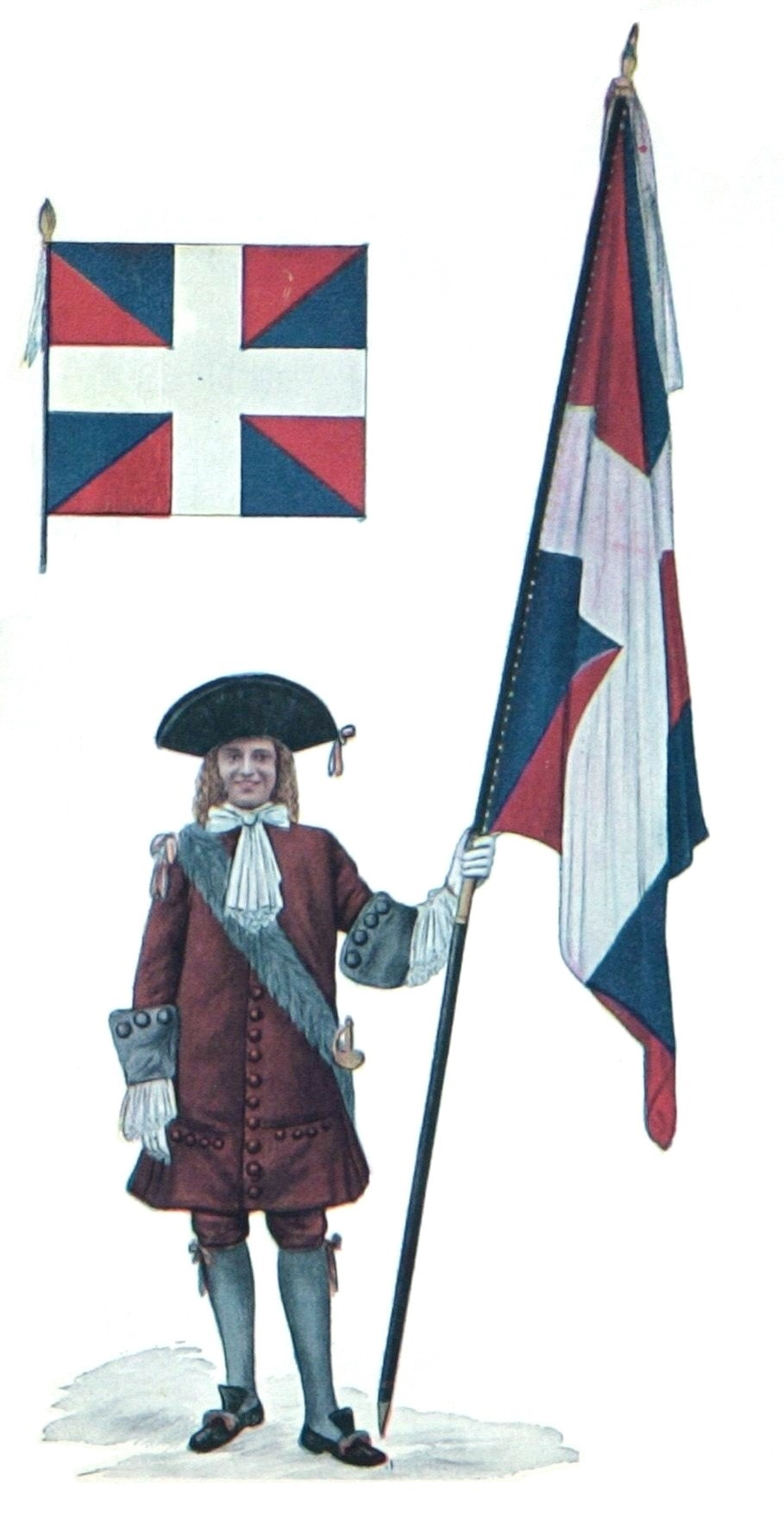
Company colours of the Carignan-Salières in Europe.

The regiment began recruiting again upon its return to France. During the Franco-Dutch War the regiment participated in the 1672 French offensive commanded by Marshal d'Humières, and was then garrisoned in Kortrijk for two years. A few companies of the regiment were detached for service in Sicily in 1674, and the following year defended the fort at Casteldaccia against a Spanish attack. The remainder of the regiment moved from Kortrijk to Huy in 1675 but left a year later after razing its fortifications. The regiment then went into garrison in Philippeville.

When Colonel Salières retired in 1676, command of the regiment passed to Louis-Thomas, Comte de Soissons, a nephew of Prince Emmanuel Philibert and older brother of Eugene of Savoy. The regiment was thereafter known as the Soissons Regiment. It was renamed the Perche Regiment in 1690 when Louis XIV, unhappy with the conduct of the Comte de Soissons, removed him from command. The Perche was incorporated into the Gardes de Lorraine Regiment in 1744, which was subsequently renamed the Lorraine Regiment in 1766. In 1791, during the French Revolution the Lorraine became the 47th Infantry Regiment. Three years later the 47th was split into the 93rd and 94th Demi-Brigades. In 1796 the 93rd was renamed the 49th Infantry of the Line and in 1803 became the 24th Infantry of the Line. The 94th became the 2nd Infantry of the Line in 1796 and renamed the 50th Infantry of the Line in 1816.

== Notable people ==
- Vincent Basset Du Tartre (fl. 1665 – 1668), was the regiment's surgeon major
