= Enders Island =

Island in New London County, Connecticut, United States

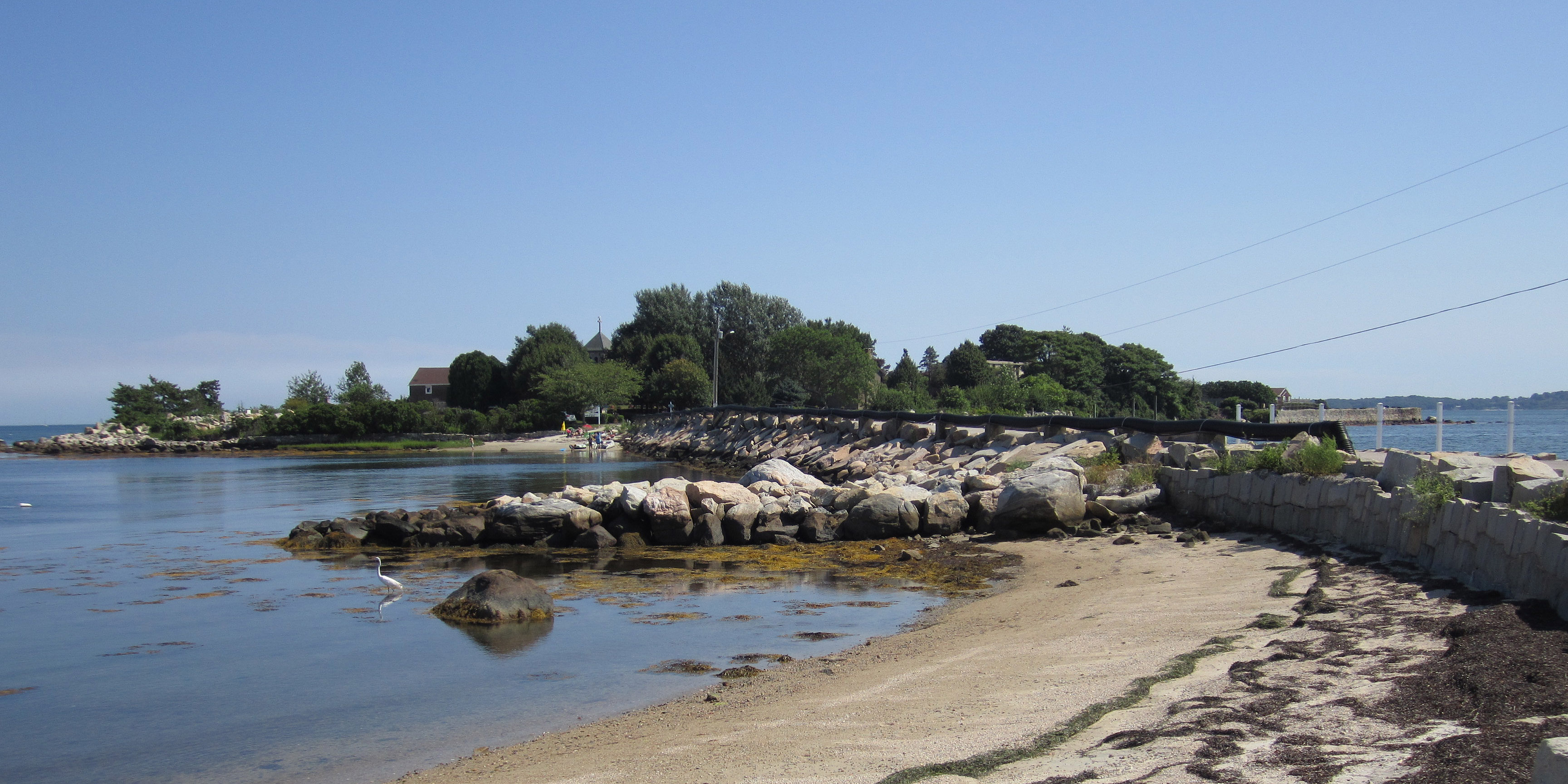
- Causeway to Enders Island, 2017

- Location within Connecticut Location within the United States

Geography
- Location: Long Island Sound
- Coordinates: 41°19′56″N 71°58′5″W

Administration
- United States
- State: Connecticut
- County: New London
- City: Stonington, Connecticut

Enders Island is an 11-acre island located within the town of Stonington, just off the coast of the Mystic section of the town, in the U.S. state of Connecticut. The island located in the Fisher's Island Sound at the base of the Mystic River and is connected to neighboring Mason's Island by a causeway. Mason's Island is connected to the mainland by another causeway. The Catholic Society of Saint Edmund operate a retreat center and art school. Enders Island is also home to a bi-annual residency offered by Fairfield University to Master of Fine Arts in Creative Writing Program students.

Per the Society's web site, "Enders Island is a place for reflection and prayer, it is not a 'Public Park'". The island offers surrounding views of the Atlantic, walking paths with flower gardens and an open chapel and gift store.

== History ==
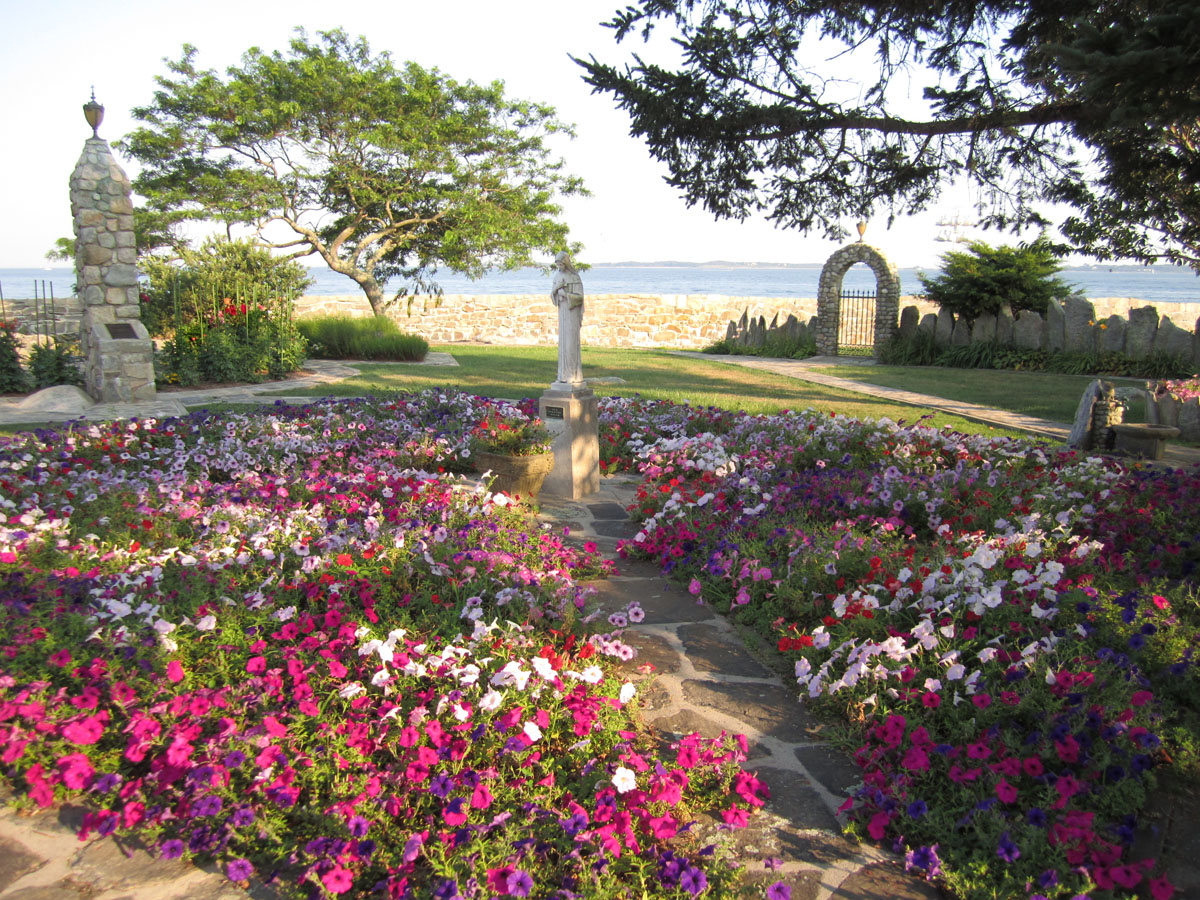
Garden path at the St. Edmund's Retreat Center, 2015

The island was referred to by various names before it became known as Enders Island: Willcock's Island, Dodge's Island, Barker's Island and Keeland's Island.

In 1787 (and likely also 1773) Dodge's Island was used to isolate patients for smallpox inoculation.

In 1910, Dr. Thomas B. Enders, the son of the president of Aetna Insurance Company, purchased the then-uninhabited island from the Daughters of Charity of Saint Vincent de Paul and in 1918 he and his wife Alys VanGilder Enders designed and oversaw the construction of a private estate with a grand main house decorated in Arts and Crafts style. The grounds still feature the Enders' imported Italian tiles in the house and garden, and a surrounding wall of large boulders that serves as a windbreak.

Before her death in 1954, Alys searched for a suitable religious institute to take over the care of her island. She approached the Bishop of the Diocese of Norwich, which saw no use of Enders Island but referred her to Father Purtill, Superior General of the Society of Saint Edmund. Thus the island was willed, requesting that it be used as a retreat and place of spiritual training for priests in the diocese. In 2003, the Society of St. Edmund relinquished the title of the island in order to ensure the long-term viability of Enders Island ministries with Pope John Paul IIs approval. The Society of St. Edmund entered completion in 2022.

In 2018, the organization operating the retreat, St. Edmund of Connecticut, sought permission from the U.S. Army Corps of Engineers to repair a deteriorating seawall on its property. This led a group of Mason's Island private residents to sue with the aim to make St. Edmund lose its rights to the island, thought to be worth tens of millions of dollars. This would have made the rights to the island revert to a group of 36 groups and individuals, including the plaintiffs. Their argument was the Retreat Center failed to conform to the original intent when Mrs. Enders bequeathed the property: its use as novitiate for the society and a place of retreat. The case itself was settled without trial in March 2025, largely in favor of St. Edmund of Connecticut. The settlement did require the society to post signage making it clear Enders Island is not open to the public, and pay the Masons Island Property Owners' Association $10,000 annually for access road upkeep.

A relic of Edmund of Abingdon, the saint's severed arm, is enshrined in the Chapel of Our Lady of the Assumption at St. Edmund's Retreat.

== Programs ==
The St. Edmund's Center residential addiction and recovery program began in the 1960s and is based on the 12-step recovery program with an emphasis on prayer and meditation. Its spiritual ministry hosts private and guided retreats for individuals, couples and groups.

The Sacred Art Institute at Enders Island was founded in the 1995 and offers classes and workshops to the public. With a focus on religious art formats and techniques, classes include iconography, stained glass, mosaics, calligraphy, wood-carving and manuscript illumination. The institute also offers workshops in Gregorian chants with live recordings performed in the onsite Chapel of Our Lady of the Assumption.

Twice a year in January and July, Fairfield University offers its Master of Fine Arts in Creative Writing Program students a 10-day residency at Enders Island.

== Nearby islands ==
- Mason's Island
- Ram Island
- Elihu Island
- Fishers Island, New York
- Goat Island
- Sandy Point Island
