= Edmund of Abingdon =

Catholic saint, Archbishop of Canterbury from 1233 to 1240

Saint Edmund of Abingdon
- Archbishop of Canterbury
- Image of Edmund from the Nuremberg Chronicle (1493)
- Appointed: 1233
- Term ended: 1240
- Predecessor: John Blund
- Successor: Boniface of Savoy

Orders
- Consecration: 2 April 1234

Personal details
- Born: perhaps 20 November c. 1174 St Edmund's Lane, Abingdon, Berkshire (now Oxfordshire), England
- Died: 16 November 1240 Soisy-Bouy, Seine-et-Marne, France
- Buried: Pontigny Abbey, Burgundy, France
- Coat of arms

Sainthood
- Feast day: 16 November
- Venerated in: Catholic Church; Anglican Communion
- Title as Saint: Archbishop
- Canonized: 16 December 1246 by Pope Innocent IV
- Attributes: archbishop making a vow before a statue of the Blessed Virgin Mary; embracing the Child Jesus; placing a ring on the finger of a statue of the Blessed Virgin Mary; receiving a lamb from the Blessed Virgin Mary; with Saint Richard of Chichester; with Saint Thomas of Canterbury
- Patronage: Abingdon, Oxfordshire; Roman Catholic Diocese of Portsmouth; St Edmund's College, Cambridge; St Edmund Hall, Oxford; St Edmund’s College, Ware.
- Shrines: Pontigny Abbey, Pontigny, Yonne, France

Edmund of Abingdon (also known as Edmund Rich, St Edmund of Canterbury, Edmund of Pontigny, French: St Edme; c. 1174 – 1240) was an English Catholic prelate who served as Archbishop of Canterbury. He became a respected lecturer in mathematics, dialectics and theology at the Universities of Paris and Oxford, promoting the study of Aristotle.

Having already an unsought reputation as an ascetic, he was ordained a priest, took a doctorate in divinity and soon became known not only for his lectures on theology but as a popular preacher, spending long years travelling within England, and engaging in 1227 preaching the Sixth Crusade.

Obliged to accept an appointment as Archbishop of Canterbury by Pope Gregory IX, he combined a gentle personal temperament with a strong public stature and severity towards King Henry III in defence of Magna Carta and in general of good civil and Church government and justice. He also worked for strict observance in monastic life and negotiated peace with Llywelyn the Great.

His policies earned him hostility and jealousy from the king, and opposition from several monasteries, including Christ Church Priory, whose monks constituted the clergy of his own Cathedral. He died in France at the beginning of a journey to Rome in 1240. He was canonised in 1246.

== Life ==
=== Early life and career ===
Edmund was born circa 1174, possibly on 20 November (the feast of St Edmund the Martyr), in Abingdon in Berkshire (now Oxfordshire), 7 miles south of Oxford, England. Edmund had two sisters and at least one brother.

"Rich" was an epithet sometimes given to his wealthy merchant father, Reynold. It was never applied to Edmund or his siblings in their lifetimes. His father retired, with his wife's consent, to the monastery at Eynsham Abbey, leaving in her hands the education of their family. Her name was Mabel; she was a devout woman who lived an ascetic life and encouraged her children to do the same. Both her daughters took the veil.

Edmund may have been educated at the monastic school in Abingdon. He developed a taste for religious learning, saw visions while still at school, and at the age of twelve took a vow of perpetual chastity in St Mary's church at Oxford. His early studies were in England, but he completed his higher education in France at the University of Paris. About 1195, in company with his brother Richard, he was sent to the schools of Paris. He studied at the universities of Oxford and Paris and became a teacher about 1200, or a little earlier. For six years he lectured on mathematics and dialectics, apparently dividing his time between Oxford and Paris, and helped introduce the study of Aristotle.

Edmund became one of Oxford's first lecturers with a Master of Arts degree, but was not Oxford's first Doctor of Divinity. Long hours at night spent in prayer had the result that he often "nodded off" during his lectures. There is a long-established tradition that he utilised his lecture-fees to build the Lady Chapel of St Peter's in the East at Oxford. The site where he lived and taught was formed into a mediaeval academic hall in his name and later incorporated as the college of St Edmund Hall.

His mother's influence then led to his taking up the study of theology. Though for some time Edmund resisted the change, he finally entered upon his new career between 1205 and 1210. He spent a year in retirement with the Augustinian canons of Merton Priory, received ordination, took a doctorate in divinity and soon became known as a lecturer on theology and as an extemporaneous preacher. In this capacity he gained some reputation for eloquence. He spent the fees which he received in charity, and refused to spend upon himself the revenues which he derived from several benefices. He often retired for solitude to Reading Abbey, and it is possible that he would have become a monk if that profession had afforded more scope for his gifts as a preacher and expositor.

Sometime between 1219 and 1222 he was appointed vicar of the parish of Calne in Wiltshire, and treasurer of Salisbury Cathedral. He held this position for eleven years, during which time he also engaged in preaching. In 1227 he preached the Sixth Crusade through a large part of England. He formed a friendship with Ela, countess of Salisbury, and her husband, William Longespée, and was noted for his works of charity and the austerity of his life.

=== Archbishop of Canterbury ===
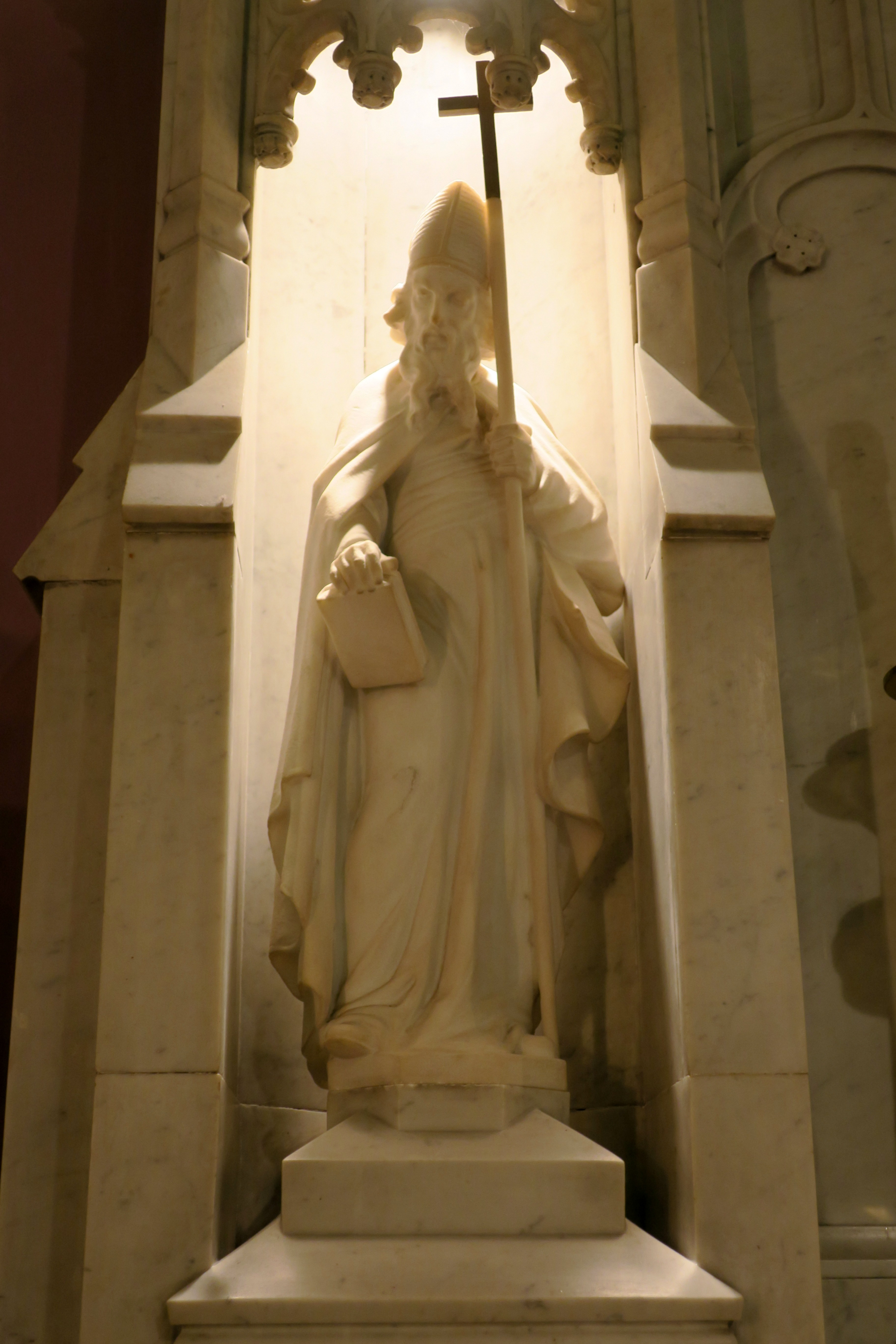
Statue of St. Edmund on the altar in St. John the Evangelist Church (Logan, Ohio)

Coat of arms of Saint Edmund of Abingdon: Or, a cross patonce gules between four Cornish choughs proper (now used by St Edmund Hall, Oxford)

In 1233 came the news of Edmund's appointment, by Pope Gregory IX, to be Archbishop of Canterbury. The chapter had already made three selections which the pope had declined to confirm. Edmund's name had been proposed as a compromise by Gregory, perhaps on account of his work for the crusade. He was consecrated on 2 April 1234.

Before his consecration Edmund became known for supporting ecclesiastical independence from Rome, maintenance of the Magna Carta and the exclusion of foreigners from civil and ecclesiastical office. Reluctant to accept appointment as archbishop, Edmund was persuaded when it was pointed out that if he refused, the Pope might very well appoint a foreign ecclesiastic. He chose as his chancellor Richard of Wich, known to later ages as St Richard of Chichester. In the name of his fellow bishops Edmund admonished Henry III of England at Westminster, on 2 February 1234, to heed the example of his father, John of England. A week after his consecration he again appeared before the king with the barons and bishops, this time threatening Henry with excommunication if he refused to dismiss his councillors, many of them foreign, and particularly Peter des Roches, Bishop of Winchester. Henry yielded, and the favourites were dismissed, Hubert de Burgh (whom they had imprisoned) was released and reconciled to the king and soon the archbishop was sent to Wales to negotiate peace with Llywelyn the Great. Edmund's success, however, turned the king against him.

Edmund was valued by the local people for his teaching, preaching, study, and his prayer; but his uncompromising stand in favour of good discipline in both civil and ecclesial government, of strict observance in monastic life, and of justice in high quarters brought him into conflict with Henry III, with several monasteries, and with the priests of Canterbury cathedral. He claimed and exercised metropolitan rights of visitation, this was often challenged and he had to resort to litigation to maintain his authority, not the least with his own monastic chapter at Canterbury.

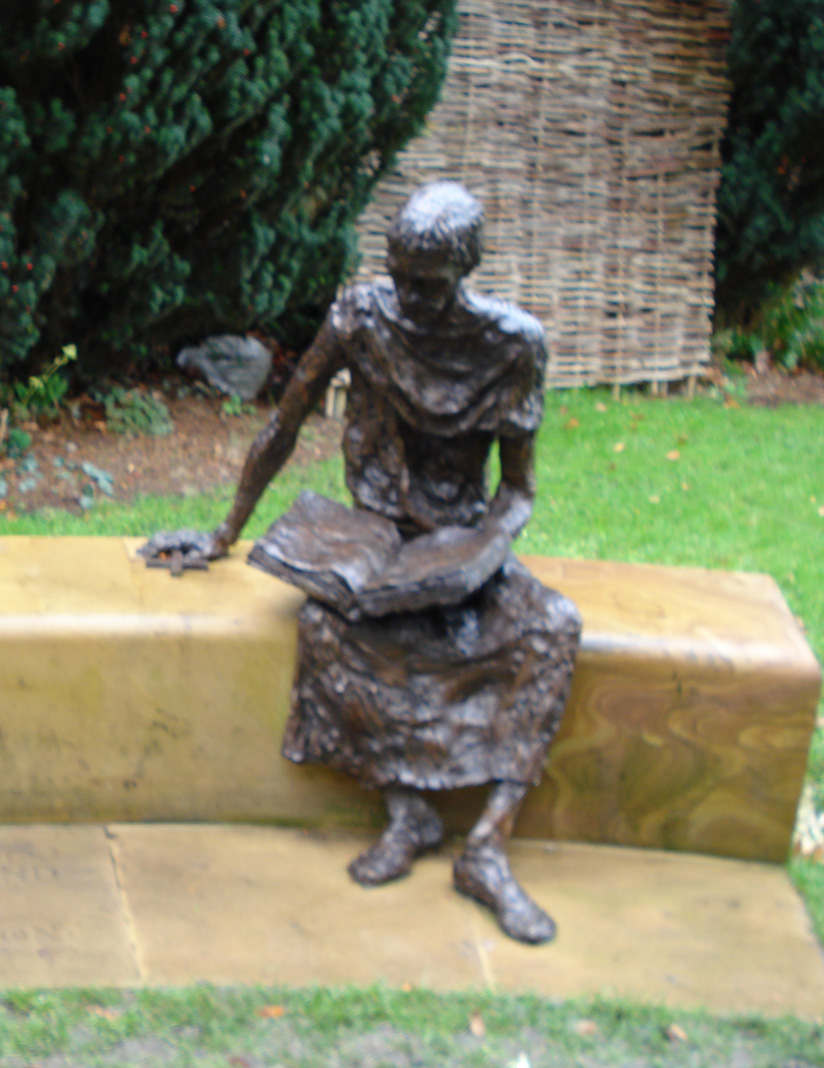
Bronze statue of Edmund at St Edmund Hall, Oxford

In 1236, with the object of emancipating himself from Edmund's control, the king asked the pope to send him a legate. On the arrival of Cardinal Odo in 1237 the archbishop found himself thwarted and insulted at every point. The politically significant marriage between Simon de Montfort and Henry's sister Eleanor, which Edmund had pronounced invalid, was ratified at Rome upon appeal. The king and legate upheld the monks of Canterbury in their opposition to Edmund's authority. Edmund protested to the king, and excommunicated in general terms all who had infringed the liberties of Canterbury. These measures had no impact, and the pope could not be moved to reverse the legate's decisions. Edmund complained that the discipline of the national church was ruined by this conflict of powers, and began to consider retirement.

=== Journey to Rome ===
Notwithstanding the gentleness of his disposition, Edmund firmly defended the rights of Church and State against the exactions and usurpations of Henry III. In December 1237 Edmund set out for Rome to plead his cause in person. From this futile mission he returned to England in August 1238 where his efforts to foster reform were frustrated. Edmund submitted to the papal demands and, early in 1240 paid to the pope's agents one fifth of his revenue, which had been levied for the pope's war against Emperor Frederick II. Other English prelates followed his example.

The papacy then ordered that 300 English benefices should be assigned to Romans. In 1240 Edmund set out for Rome. At the Cistercian Pontigny Abbey in France he became sick, began travelling back to England, but died only 50 miles further north, on 16 November 1240, at the house of Augustinian Canons at Soisy-Bouy and was taken back to Pontigny.

=== Veneration ===
Less than a year after Edmund's death, miracles were alleged to be wrought at his grave. Despite Henry's opposition, he was canonised only six years after his death, in December 1246. His feast day is 16 November. A few years later, the first chapel dedicated to him, St Edmund's Chapel, was consecrated in Dover by his friend Richard of Chichester, making it the only chapel dedicated to one English saint by another; this small building still stands.

At Salisbury, a collegiate church founded in 1269 by Bishop de la Wyle was dedicated to Edmund; rebuilt in 1407, the church is now Salisbury Arts Centre. An altar in the cathedral is also dedicated to him.

Today he is remembered in the name of St Edmund Hall, Oxford and St Edmund's College, Cambridge. His name is given also to St Edmund's College, Ware; St Edmund's School, Canterbury; St Edmund's School, Hindhead; St Edmund's Catholic School, Portsmouth; St Edmund of Abingdon pastoral area of the Roman Catholic Diocese of Clifton; St Edmund's Roman Catholic Primary School, Abingdon, Oxfordshire and St Edmund Preparatory High School, Brooklyn, NY.

Edmund Rich of Abingdon is remembered in the Church of England with a commemoration on 16 November.

=== Relics ===
Edmund's body was never translated to Canterbury, because the Benedictine community there resented what they regarded as Edmund's attacks on their independence. After his death he was taken back to Pontigny Abbey, where his main relics are now found in a baroque reliquary tomb dating to the 17th century.

An arm is enshrined in the Chapel of Our Lady of the Assumption at St. Edmund's Retreat on Enders Island off the coast of Mystic, Connecticut. The retreat is operated by the Society of the Fathers and Brothers of St. Edmund.

In 1853, the fibula of Edmund's left leg was presented to St Edmund's College, Ware, by Cardinal Wiseman. Many local cures of serious illnesses were attributed to the intercession of St Edmund; one of the earliest of these was of a student who nearly died after a fall in 1871. His complete healing led to the accomplishment of a vow to extend the Pugin chapel with a side chapel to honour the saint.

The Islamic silk chasuble, with the main fabric probably made in Al-Andalus, that Edmund had with him at his death remains in the museum in Provins, with a stole and maniple.

=== Character ===
Edmund's life was one of self-sacrifice and devotion to others. From boyhood he practised asceticism, such as fasting on Saturdays on bread and water, and wearing a hair shirt. After a few hours' sleep, he spent most of the night in prayer and meditation.

== Works ==
Besides his "Constitutions", issued in 1236 (printed in W. Lynwood's Constitutiones Angliae, Oxford, 1679), Edmund wrote a work in the genre of the Speculum literature entitled Speculum ecclesiae (London, 1521; Eng. transl., 1527; reprinted in M. de la Bigne's Bibliotheca veterum patrum, v., Paris, 1609), which was translated into Anglo-Norman around the second half of the thirteenth century as Mirour de Seinte Eglyse ('a mirror of the holy Church'), a treatise about the Christian faith aimed at religious practitioners. (The French text was then revised in a version labelled by its editor as a 'lay version', which is attested principally in the manuscript London, British Library, MS Arundel 288).

== Religious Congregation of the Society of St Edmund ==
Edmund's life inspired the formation of the Society of Saint Edmund at Pontigny, France, in 1843 by Jean Baptiste Muard and Pierre Boyer. The Society intended to keep Edmund's memory and life alive by conducting parish missions in the archdiocese of Sens, so as to revitalize the faith of the people who had become alienated from the Church. Members of the Society, based in Pontigny, fled to the United States in 1889 after widespread anticlericalism in France. The Society of Saint Edmund settled in Winooski Park, Vermont and in 1904 established Saint Michael's College where the deeds and values of Edmund's life continue through the college mission. Today members of the Society of Saint Edmund devote themselves to parochial work in the Diocese of Burlington, Vermont, ministry to the African American community through the Edmundite Missions in Selma, Alabama, to higher education at Saint Michael's College, and retreat ministry at Saint Edmund's Retreat (Enders Island) in Connecticut as well as Saint Anne's Shrine in Vermont.

== Citations ==
Catholic Church titles
Preceded by John Blund	Archbishop of Canterbury; 1233–1240	Succeeded by Boniface of Savoy
