= Edmund the Martyr (disambiguation) =

Edmund the Martyr was a 9th-century king of East Anglia and saint.

People with similar names who might be confused with him include:

- Edward the Martyr, 10th-century king of England
- Edmund Rich, 13th-century archbishop and saint, but not a martyr
- Edmund Campion, Jesuit martyr
