= St Edmund's Catholic School, Portsmouth =

St Edmund's Catholic School

Location
- Arundel Street; Portsmouth, Hampshire, PO1 1RX; England
- Coordinates: 50.7991°N 1.0857°W

Information
- Type: Voluntary aided school
- Religious affiliation: Roman Catholic
- Local authority: Portsmouth City Council
- Department for Education URN: 116505 Tables
- Ofsted: Reports
- Headteacher: Simon Graham
- Gender: Coeducational
- Age: 11 to 16
- Enrolment: 1,098 as of December 2022
- Website: https://www.saintedmunds.org.uk/

St Edmund's Catholic School is a coeducational Roman Catholic secondary school, located in Portsmouth in the English county of Hampshire.

It is a voluntary aided school in the trusteeship of the Roman Catholic Diocese of Portsmouth, and is maintained by Portsmouth City Council. The school is named after Saint Edmund Rich, a 13th-century Archbishop of Canterbury.

St Edmund's Catholic School offers GCSEs, BTECs and OCR Nationals as programmes of study for pupils.
