= Pierre La Motte =

Canadian politician

Pierre de St. Paul, Sieur de La Motte (Pierre La Motte or Pierre Lamotte) (d. November 27, 1685) was captain of a company of the Carignan-Salieres Regiment that was dispatched to New France (Canada) in 1665 by King Louis XIV to protect French colonists to protect French settlers aided by Algonquians against Iroquois attacks.

A native of Lot-et-Garonne in France, he served as an ensign in the Conty regiment in 1657 and then as captain in the Estrade regiment.

He and his company sailed on a decrepit royal ship, the Aigle d’Or (Golden Eagle) from La Rochelle, France on May 13, 1665 accompanying the Marquis de Salières, Colonel of the Regiment. They landed at Québec during the third week of August, 1665 after about 95 days at sea.

La Motte’s company was almost immediately dispatched to fortify the southern flank of New France. They built a trail connecting Fort Sainte Thérèse and Fort Saint-Louis (Chambly). In 1666, the company built a fort on a small island overlooking the northern end of the "Iroquois Lake," today’s Lake Champlain. The fort was garrisoned by about 300 French soldiers over the next four years, after which time the troops were pulled back to Québec. Before retreating, the fort was destroyed by the French soldiers. La Motte was made commander at Montreal and later interim governor. Fort Sainte Anne was the first European settlement in Vermont.

Captain de La Motte chose not to remain in New France as a colonist and he returned to France in the summer of 1670 (or possibly the end of 1673), along with some members of his regiment. He died at Gadencourt.

Isle La Motte, Vermont, a small island in Lake Champlain which was the site of Fort Sainte Anne, was named for Pierre La Motte.
