= Isle La Motte =

Isle La Motte Île La Motte (French)
- Town
- The Head at the south end of Isle La Motte

- Location in Grand Isle County and the state of Vermont
- Coordinates: 44°51′55″N 73°21′32″W
- Country: United States
- State: Vermont
- County: Grand Isle
- Named for: Pierre La Motte

Area
  - Total: 16.7 sq mi (43.2 km^{2})
  - Land: 7.9 sq mi (20.4 km^{2})
  - Water: 8.8 sq mi (22.7 km^{2})
- Elevation: 98 ft (30 m)

Population (2020)
  - Total: 488
  - Density: 62/sq mi (23.9/km^{2})
- Time zone: UTC−5 (Eastern (EST))
  - Summer (DST): UTC−4 (EDT)
- ZIP Code: 05463
- Area code: 802
- FIPS code: 50-35875
- GNIS feature ID: 1462125
- Website: islelamotte.us

Isle La Motte (French: Île La Motte) is an island in Lake Champlain in northwestern Vermont, United States. At 7 mi (11 km) by 2 mi (3 km), it lies close to the place that the lake empties into the Richelieu River. It is incorporated as a New England town in Grand Isle County. Its population was 488 at the 2020 census.

The island is named after a French soldier, Pierre La Motte, who built a military outpost on the island in 1666. The island's population significantly increases in the summer months. The island is the site of Fort Sainte Anne, Saint Anne's Shrine, the Methodist Episcopal Church of Isle La Motte, the Fisk Quarry and Goodsell Ridge Preserves, the Isle La Motte Elementary School, and the Isle La Motte Lighthouse.

== History ==
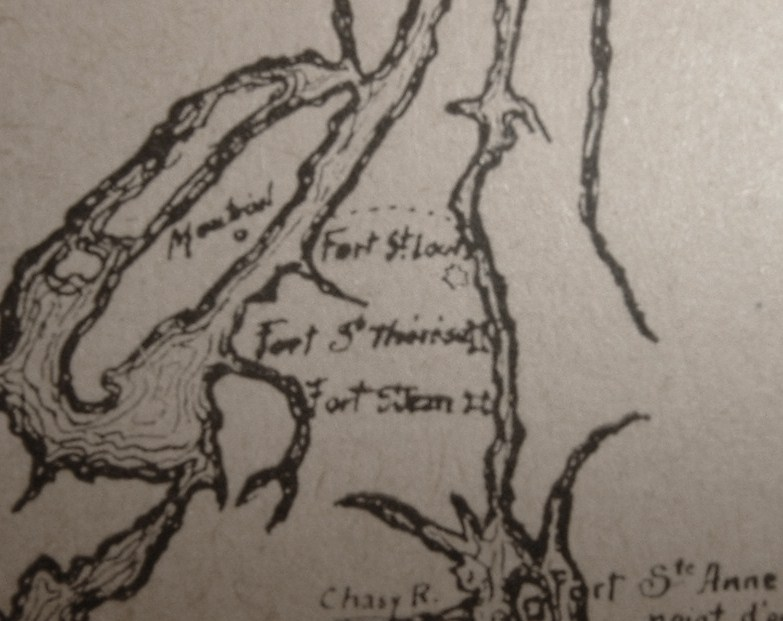
Map of Fort Sainte-Anne and other forts on the Richelieu River, c. 1666

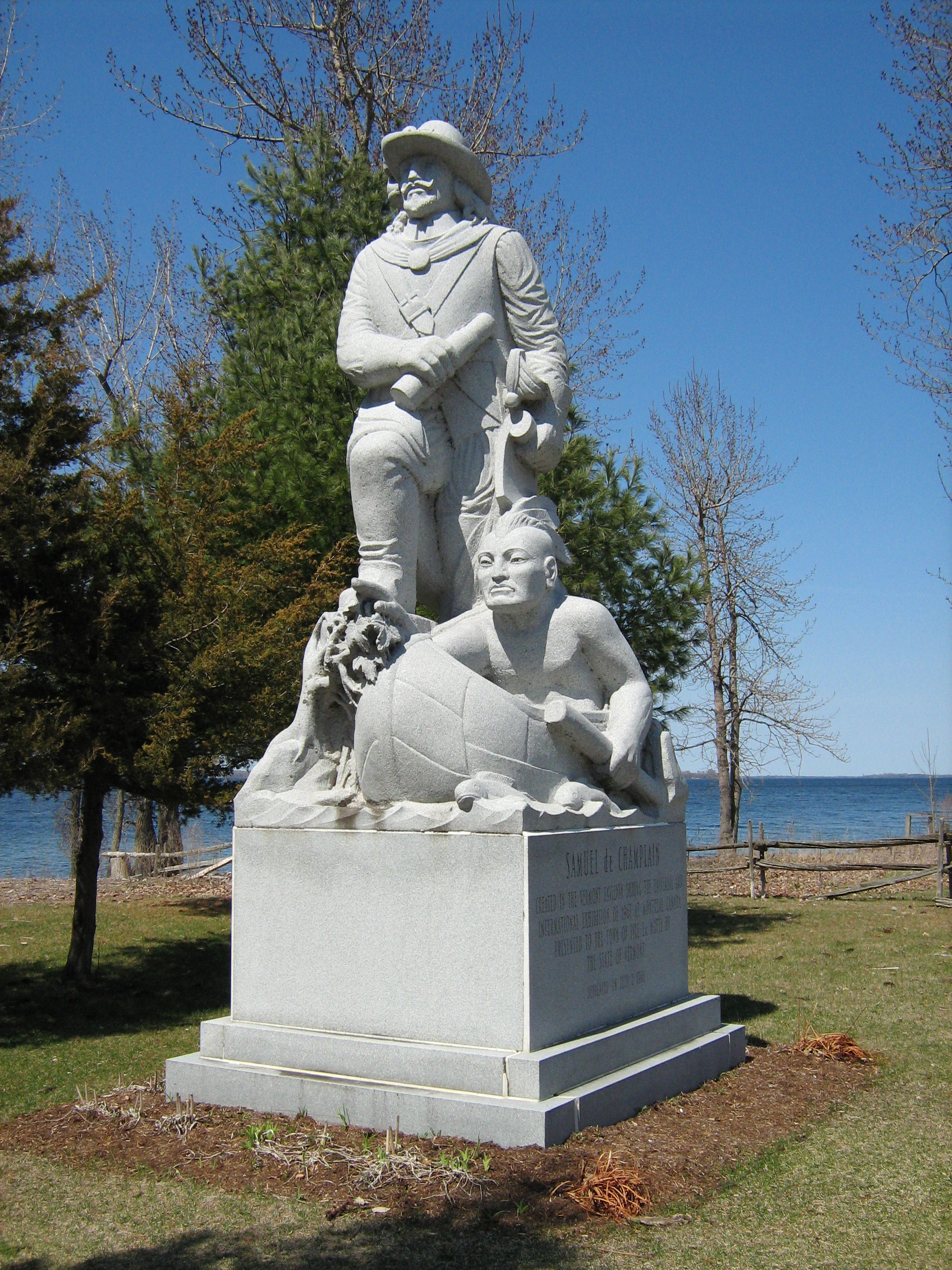
Statue of Champlain and guide on Isle La Motte

On July 9, 1609, Samuel de Champlain disembarked on the island.

In 1665, the French began building a series of forts along the Richelieu River to protect New France from the Iroquois. From north to south these were Fort Richelieu, Fort Chambly, and Fort Sainte Thérèse.

Four companies of the Carignan-Salières Regiment were sent from Quebec City to extend these forts further south, under Captain Pierre La Motte. They built a trail connecting Fort Sainte Thérèse and Fort Saint-Louis (Chambly).

In 1666, Fort Saint-Jean and the farthest south Fort Sainte Anne on Isle La Motte were added. The fort included Saint Anne's Shrine. Both the fort and chapel were dedicated to Saint Anne. In 1668, the bishop of Quebec, François de Laval, came to Isle La Motte to baptise a number of Iroquois to Christianity. Even after the abandonment of the fort, the shrine continued to give mass to worshipers. The fort was the first European settlement in what is now Vermont.

Fort Saint Anne was the one most vulnerable to attack. The fort was garrisoned by about 300 French soldiers over the next four years, and the troops were then pulled back to Québec after they had destroyed the fort.

In 1746, a party of Mohawks under Hendrick Theyanoguin, returning from a conference with the Governor of New France in Montreal, attacked a group of Frenchmen at Isle La Motte before returning to Albany. The incident was followed by Mohawk raids along the St. Lawrence River in 1747.

In the mid-1800s, orchards, vineyards, and dairy farms flourished on the island, which was then connected to the mainland by ferry during the warmer months and by foot or wagon over the ice in winter. In November 1802, Isle La Motte was renamed to "Vineyard," but the original name was restored in November 1830.

In 1878, the town was incorporated for the sole purpose of building a bridge to Alburgh that was completed in 1882.

Fisk Farm was the site at which the Vermont Fish and Game League was addressed in August 1897 by President William McKinley, and on September 6, 1901 by Vice President Theodore Roosevelt. While there, Roosevelt learned of the shooting of McKinley, which led to Roosevelt becoming president upon McKinley's death eight days later.

== Geology and quarrying ==
The island, along with Valcour Island south of Plattsburgh, was formed 480 million years ago as a reef during the Ordovician Period in a shallow tropical sea, near where Morocco is today. At that time there was no life on dry land except for a few primitive plants such as mosses and algae. Almost all of life was in the oceans. Carbon dioxide levels were 14–16 times higher than today, with high sea levels covering much of the continents, which were mostly located south of the equator. The stromatoporoid patch reef, one of the oldest known metazoan reefs, originally stretched a thousand miles from what is now Quebec to Tennessee, but only a few remnants remain today. The island's fossil reefs are part of the Chazy Fossil Reef, a National Natural Landmark dedicated in 2009.

Reef builders during this period in earth history were principally bryozoa, stromatolites, stromatoporoids, sponges, and algae. Other marine life included cephalopods, gastropods, crinoids, and trilobites. Today fossil gastropods (snails) can be seen at the abandoned quarries.

Black limestone from the Chazy Formation was quarried on the island. The oldest quarry behind Fisk Farm started as early as 1832.

The limestone is composed of calcite and fossils of marine creatures. It is so dark in appearance that it was marketed in the 18th and 19th century as "black marble" and was used for the construction of the U.S. Capitol building and the National Gallery of Art. Structures made of the stone still visible on the island are the Isle La Motte Public Library, the Isle La Motte Methodist Church, Isle La Motte Historical Society (formerly the South Stone School House), ruins of the Fisk House at Fisk Farm, and the original Fisk House.

== Demographics ==
Historical population
Census	Pop.	Note	%±
1790	47		—
1800	135		187.2%
1810	623		361.5%
1820	312		−49.9%
1830	459		47.1%
1840	435		−5.2%
1850	476		9.4%
1860	564		18.5%
1870	497		−11.9%
1880	505		1.6%
1890	551		9.1%
1900	608		10.3%
1910	510		−16.1%
1920	385		−24.5%
1930	352		−8.6%
1940	335		−4.8%
1950	295		−11.9%
1960	238		−19.3%
1970	262		10.1%
1980	393		50.0%
1990	408		3.8%
2000	488		19.6%
2010	471		−3.5%
2020	488		3.6%
U.S. Decennial Census

The town has a total area of 16.7 square miles (43.2 km^{2}), of which 7.9 square miles (20.4 km^{2}) are land (the area of the island) and 8.8 square miles (22.7 km^{2}), or 52.68% of the town, are water. Data for the town from the 2010 census:

- Residential population: 471
- Families: 133, average size 2.77
- Population density: 59.5 per square mile (23.1/km^{2})
- Housing units: 454 at an average density of 57.5 per square mile (22.3/km^{2})
- Self-declared race: 92.6% White, 0.8% Black, 0.8% Native American, 0.4% Asian, 0.2% Native Hawaiian or Pacific Islander, 0.6% some other race, and 4.5% from two or more races. 0.8% of the population were Hispanic or Latino of any race.
- Households: 204, of which 27.0% had children under the age of 18 living with them, 50.5% were headed by married couples, 8.8% had a female householder with no husband present, and 34.8% were non-families. 28.9% of all households were made up of individuals, and 7.9% were someone living alone who was 65 years of age or older. The average household size was 2.31.
- Demographics: the median age was 45.6 years. 20.4% of the population were under the age of 18, 5.5% were from 18 to 24, 23.1% were from 25 to 44, 37.0% were from 45 to 64, and 14.0% were 65 years of age or older. For every 100 females, there were 97.9 males. For every 100 females age 18 and over, there were 100.5 males.
- Income: For the period 2011–2015, the per capita income for the town was $24,728. 6.3% of families and 7.0% of the population were below the poverty line, including 8.4% of those under age 18 and 10.5% of those age 65 or over. The median annual income for a household in the town was $49,167, and the median income for a family was $51,500. Male full-time workers had a median income of $46,750 versus $34,792 for females.
- Transportation: The city is served by nearby Burlington International Airport and Plattsburgh International Airport.
