= Saint Anne's Shrine =

Coordinates: 44.899798°N 73.347264°W

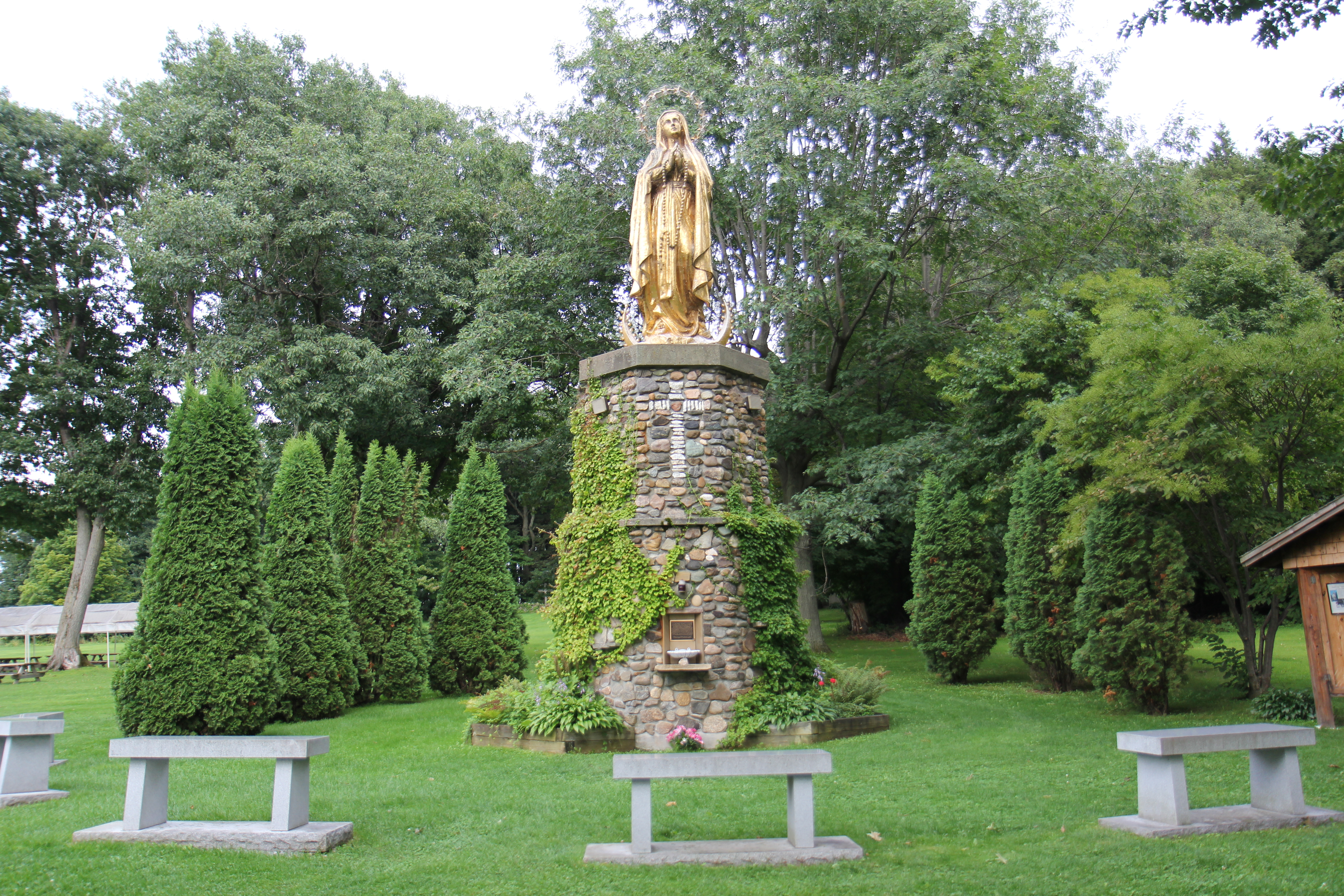
A statue and reflection area at Saint Anne's Shrine

Saint Anne's Shrine is a Roman Catholic shrine and retreat center in Isle La Motte, Vermont, on the shores of Lake Champlain. The shrine and retreat center are located several miles south of the Canada–US border, on Shrine Road, near U.S. Route 2.

== History ==
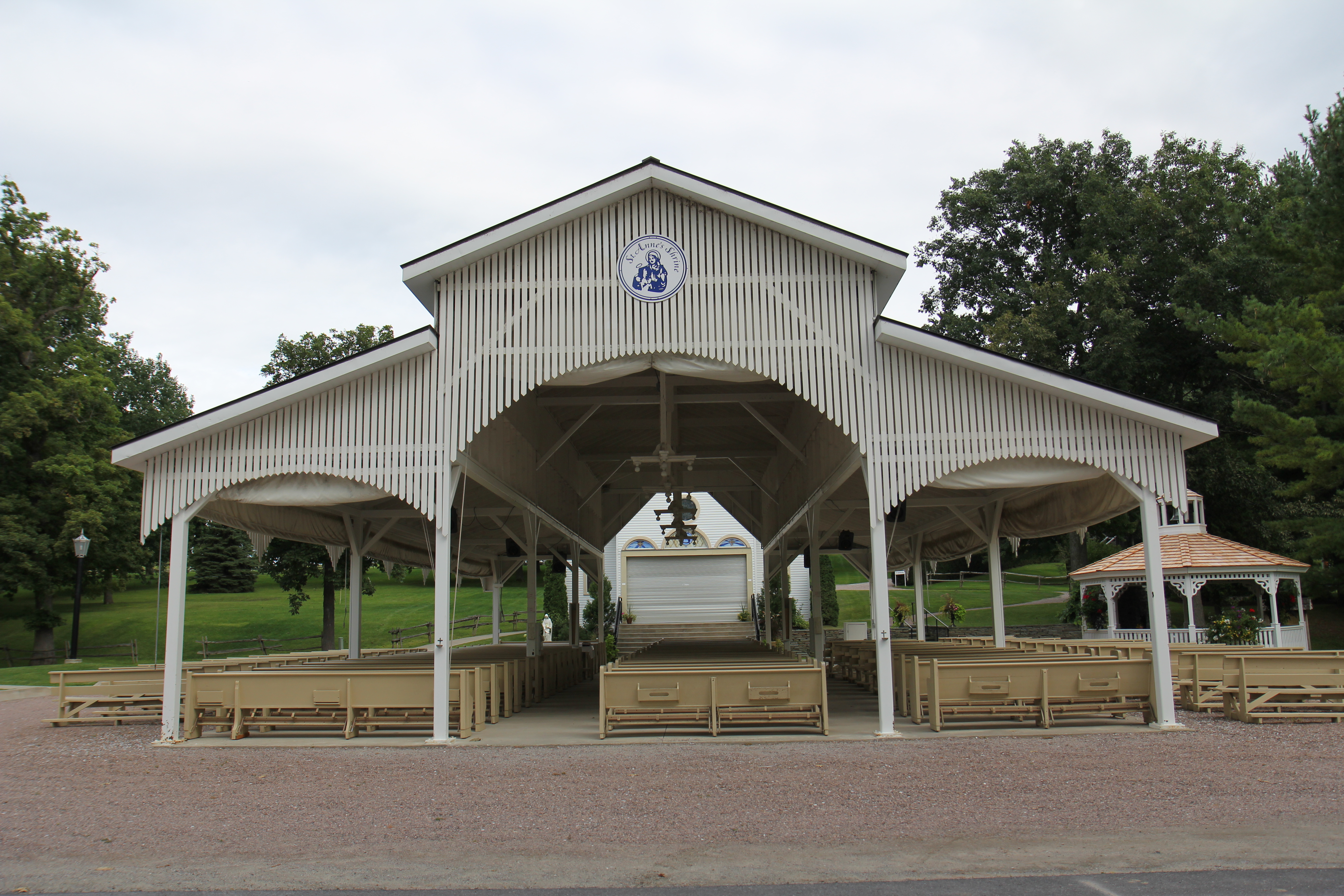
Church

In 1666, Fort Sainte Anne was built on Isle La Motte to protect Montreal from attacks by the Iroquois Indians. Both the fort and chapel were dedicated to Saint Anne, the mother of the Virgin Mary. It was the site of the first Catholic Mass celebrated in Vermont. In 1668, the bishop of Quebec, François de Laval, came to Isle La Motte to baptize a number of Iroquois to Christianity. Even after the abandonment of the fort, the shrine continued to offer mass to worshipers. The Fort was destroyed sometime between 1670 and 1690; the Way of Calvary at the Shrine marks the place where the Fort once stood.

In 1892, Louis de Goesbriand, the Bishop of Burlington was able to purchase the land at Fort Saint Anne in order to preserve its history. A small chapel was built. Father Joseph Kerlidou was the first director of St. Anne's Shrine. He excavated a portion of the site, uncovering knives, buttons, pottery, and other artifacts. They attest to not only French, but earlier Native American presence on the site. Some of the artifacts are on display at St. Anne's.

== Present day ==
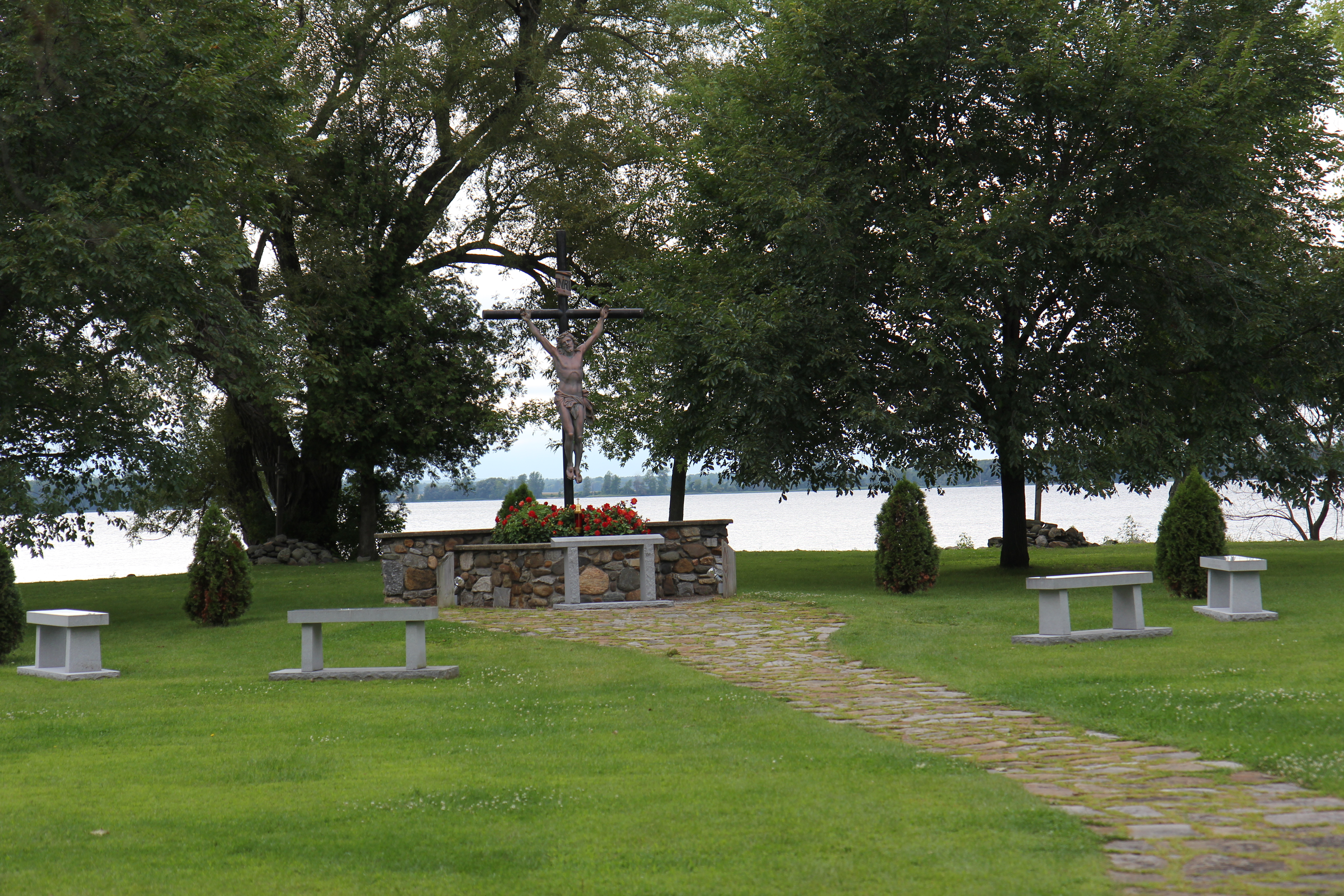
A crucifix and reflection area

The shrine is run by the Edmundite Fathers in cooperation with the Diocese of Burlington. The shrine hosts various functions, such as retreats, pilgrimages, and the Annual Diocesan Family Day Mass.

Daily mass is offered at 11:15 AM through July & August. The Retreat Center is open year round and can accommodate 86 guests per night. The meeting center and dining room can hold 150 people. The grounds are open to the public year round and feature a chapel, a grotto, numerous statues and places to light candles, reflection gardens, and a beach. There is a memorial that visitors can walk through and learn about local history as well as a statue of Samuel De Champlain.

The all purpose Welcome Center provides space in inclement weather. The cafe and history room are open from Memorial Day to Columbus Day Wednesday-Friday & Sunday 10–2 with Saturday 12–5; closed Monday & Tuesday.
