= Richard Tarrant (politician) =

American businessman and politician (1942–2025)

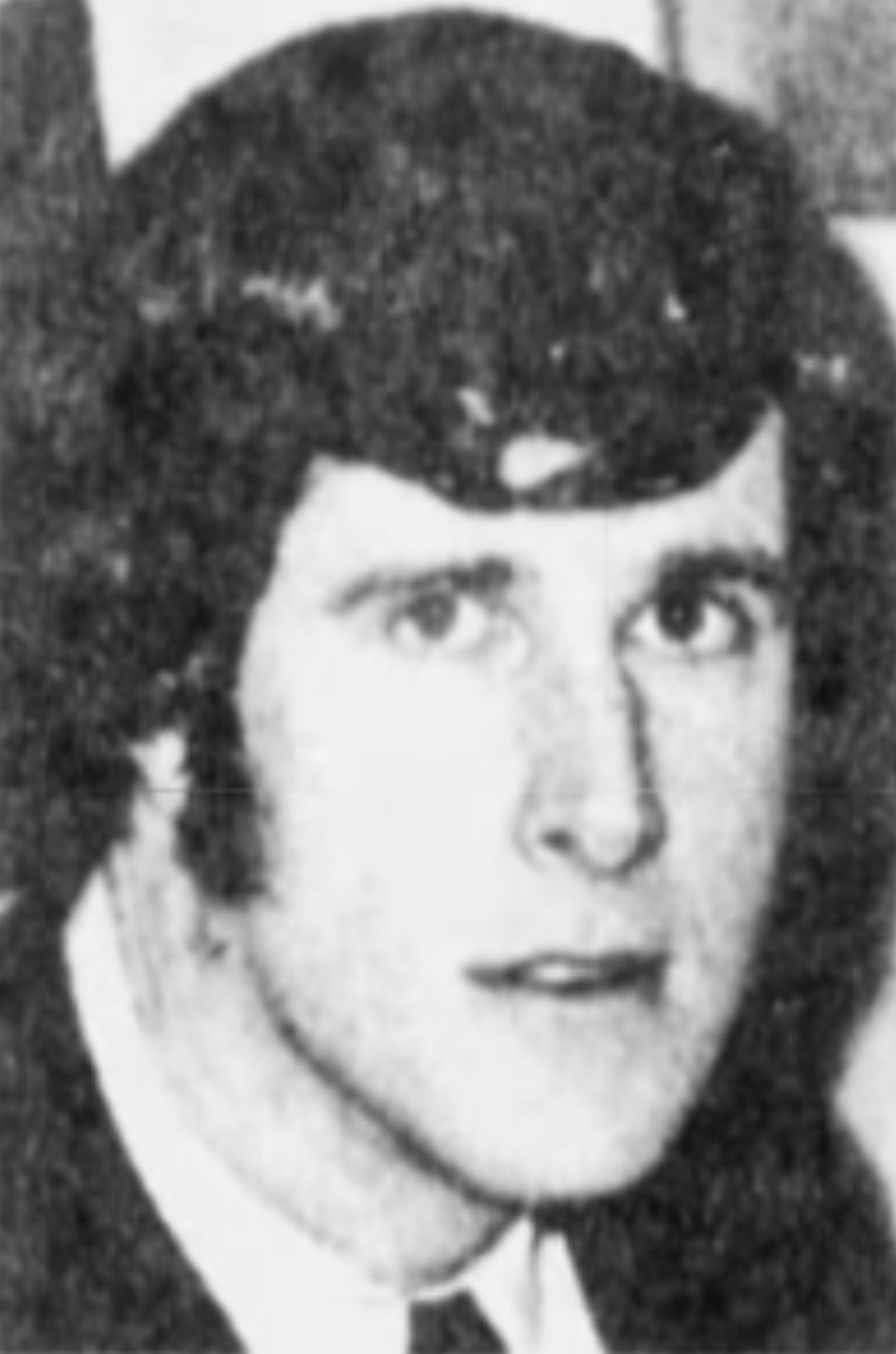
- Tarrant in 1972

Personal details
- Born: Richard Edward Tarrant; August 6, 1942 Newark, New Jersey, U.S.
- Died: August 12, 2025 (aged 83)
- Party: Republican
- Occupation: Businessman

Richard Edward Tarrant (August 6, 1942 – August 12, 2025) was an American businessman and politician. He was the Republican nominee for U.S. Senator from Vermont in 2006, a contest he lost to U.S. Representative Bernie Sanders. Tarrant and his wife, Deborah, lived until 2010 in Colchester, Vermont, where he ran his charitable foundation. He then moved his primary residence to Florida but continued to support the foundation.

== Early life ==
Tarrant was born in Newark, New Jersey, and raised in West Orange, New Jersey.

Tarrant initially went to Saint Bonaventure University and was a walk-on with the basketball team. He requested a scholarship but was denied. Tarrant then transferred to Saint Michael's College on a basketball scholarship and was a first-team All-American in his senior year. He led the Purple Knights to the Final Four of the 1965 NCAA Men's Division II Basketball Tournament, where they were defeated 93–70 by the University of Evansville, who had Jerry Sloan and Larry Humes, both All-Americans. In the consolation game of the same tournament, Tarrant played against Phil Jackson of North Dakota, who went on to fame as a player, coach, and executive in the National Basketball Association. He was a fourth-round draft pick of the world champion Boston Celtics, but was cut before the first game of the season. Tarrant graduated from Saint Michael's in 1965 with a bachelor's degree in mathematics. He then went to work for IBM in Burlington, Vermont, selling computer equipment in the northern part of the state.

== Business career ==
In 1969, Tarrant and his business partners Robert Hoehl and, later, Paul Egerman founded Burlington Data Processing (BDP) with a Small Business Administration loan. The company changed its name to Interpretive Data System (IDS) and later to IDX Systems Corporation. BDP initially provided payroll and claims processing for physicians. By 2005, IDX had contracted with thousands of doctors' offices across the country, and provided computer technology for many of the United Kingdom's medical centers.

Between 1995 and 2005, Tarrant was chairman of IDX's board. In 2006, General Electric bought IDX for $1.2 billion. Tarrant lived in Colchester, Vermont, where he worked for his charitable foundation.

Tarrant served as a member of the University of Vermont's board of trustees for several years and on the Saint Michael's College Board of Trustees. He donated funds to Saint Michael's for a new athletic center that was named in his parents' honor.

== Philanthropy ==
Tarrant and his wife created the Richard E. and Deborah L. Tarrant Foundation, which makes grants intended to enrich the quality of life in communities throughout Vermont. Its "primary areas of focus are basic human services, education and community-based grantmaking." In 2005, the Grantsmanship Center listed the foundation as one of the top 40 Vermont foundations in charitable giving. The foundation is prohibited from making any donations to pro-choice groups.

Tarrant's foundation later invested in the Milton public school system, providing monetary support for a pilot program ("Home School at School") that gave students an opportunity to learn at different paces.

In 2007, Tarrant's foundation gave $1 million toward the creation of a $1.8 million community center in Winooski, Vermont.

On December 18, 2018, the University of Vermont announced that Tarrant and his family had given $15 million for its new multi-purpose center, which will house the men's basketball team and be called the Tarrant Event Center. It is the second athletic-related facility that bears the Tarrant name in Vermont. In 1994, Tarrant donated $5 million toward the construction of St. Michael's College's student recreation center, which is named in honor of his parents.

== 2006 campaign for U.S. Senate ==
In 2005, Tarrant announced his candidacy for the U.S. Senate seat vacated by the retirement of Independent Senator Jim Jeffords. On September 12, 2006, he won the Republican nomination, defeating U.S. Air Force Lieutenant Colonel Greg Parke and marijuana legalization activist Cris Ericson. Tarrant faced Independent Representative Bernie Sanders in the November general election. Sanders, who won the Democratic nomination but ran as an Independent, defeated Tarrant by 33 percentage points. The race was the most expensive race in Vermont history, with the candidates together spending close to $13 million. Tarrant spent about $7 million of his own money on the race; Sanders raised about $6.5 million and spent most of it. Tarrant's campaign was remarkable for its saturation of radio and television with a serial biography of the candidate and attack ads on Sanders.

== Death ==
Tarrant died on August 12, 2025, aged 83.

Party political offices
Preceded by Jim Jeffords	Republican nominee for U.S. Senator from Vermont (Class 1); 2006	Succeeded by John MacGovern
