= Wequetequock Cove =

Cove in Connecticut, United States

Coordinates: 41°20′36″N 71°52′56″W

Wequetequock Cove is a cove located in southeastern Connecticut, near Stonington. It empties into Fishers Island Sound. Elihu Island and Goat Island (Connecticut) are in Wequetequock Cove. Saltwater Farm Vineyard is located along its shore. Fishers Island, New York, is a boundary between the Cove and the Atlantic Ocean.
