= Jim Hefferon =

American mathematician (born 1958)

Jim Hefferon (born October 12, 1958) is an American mathematician serving as the Professor of Mathematics at the University of Vermont. He is known for his award-winning textbook on linear algebra that is available for free download, with LaTeX source, and for his activity in the TeX community.

== Early life ==
Jim Hefferon grew up in Connecticut and attended the University of Connecticut, where he obtained a PhD in Mathematics, specializing in recursion theory, as a student of Manuel Lerman.

== Saint Michael's days ==
Jim Hefferon moved to Colchester, Vermont in 1990 to take a job at Saint Michael's College. He became an active member of the Linux community, including founding the Vermont Area Group of Unix Enthusiasts.

== Textbooks ==
In 2020, for his open-content undergraduate textbook Linear Algebra, Hefferon won the Daniel Solow Author's Award of the Mathematical Association of America, with the award citation noting the book's "clear writing style, tremendous variety of exercises, amenability to use with active learning strategies, and […] careful attention to detail" and its status as one of "the most successful and the most popular" open textbooks. Since 1996, Hefferon's Linear Algebra has been available for free download on the World Wide Web under the GNU Free Documentation License or a Creative Commons license. As of 2020, the book is in its fourth edition and is published by Orthogonal Publishing L3C.

Other textbooks of Hefferon's, made available under the same terms, are an inquiry-based Introduction to Proofs and a textbook on computer science, Theory of Computation.

== TeX connection ==
Hefferon is a member of the board of directors of the TeX Users Group (TUG), serving from 2019 to 2023. He previously had been a member of the board from 2003 to 2017, serving as vice-president of TUG from 2011 until 2016, when he became acting president of TUG when the board of directors suspended the previous president, Kaveh Bazargan.

In 1999 Jim became one of the core maintainers of the TeX archive CTAN, running one of three core CTAN archive sites until 2011.

== Other interests ==
Jim is a Ham radio enthusiast, holding the Extra Class license KE1AZ, and is active with Morse code.
