= Lorraine Sterritt =

17th President of Saint Michael's College

Lorraine Sterrit

17th President of Saint Michael's College
- In office September 22, 2018 – June 30, 2023
- Preceded by: John J. Neuhauser
- Succeeded by: Richard Plumb

20th President of Salem College
- In office 2014–2018

Personal details
- Born: Northern Ireland
- Education: Queen's University Belfast (BA, MA); Princeton University (MA, PhD)

Lorraine Sterritt is an Irish-American academic administrator who served as the 17th president of Saint Michael's College in Colchester, Vermont.

== Early life and education ==
Sterritt was born and raised in Northern Ireland. She earned a Bachelor and Master of Arts degree in French from Queen's University Belfast, studying as a member of the Stranmillis University College. She went on to earn another master's degree and PhD in French from Princeton University.

== Career ==
Sterritt first visited the United States in 1984 and moved to Virginia in 1985. She became an American citizen in 1990. She began her career as an educator at Chatham Hall, an all-girls private boarding school in Chatham, Virginia, where she served as the school's director and taught French and Latin from 1985 to 1991.

From 1991 to 1996, Sterritt was assistant master of Wilson College at Princeton University while earning her PhD. In 1996, she became associate dean of freshmen at Harvard University before moving to the University of Pennsylvania, where she was the dean of freshmen and director of academic advising. From 2004 to 2010, she was an administrator and professor at Stanford University and worked as associate dean for graduate and undergraduate studies at the Stanford University School of Humanities and Sciences. She then returned to Harvard, where she was a member of the Harvard Faculty of Arts and Sciences and dean for administration at Harvard College. Sterritt was the 20th president of Salem College in Winston-Salem, North Carolina, from 2014 to 2018.

Sterritt was announced as the 17th president of Saint Michael's College in January 2018. She officially took office on September 22, 2018. Sterritt is the first female president of the university. In February 2023, she announced her retirement effective June 30, 2023. Richard Plumb succeeded her to the presidency effective January 1, 2024.

== Personal life ==
Sterritt is married to Norbert "Bert" Lain, an academic who served as a professor of Latin and Classics at Stanford University.
