= Matty Benedetto =

American product designer and internet creator

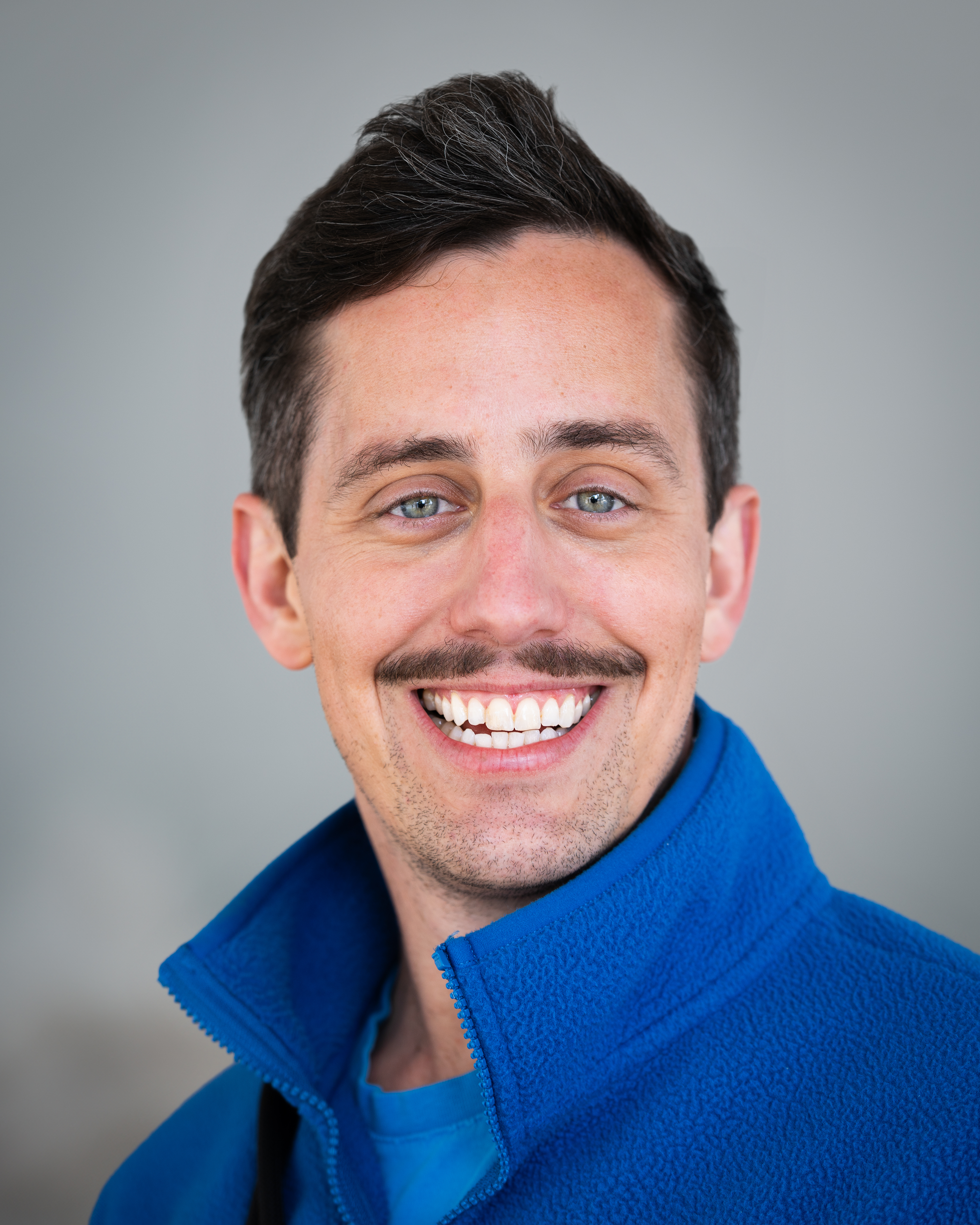
- Bendetto in 2026
- Born: December 31, 1990 (age 35)
- Occupations: Product designer; Inventor; YouTuber
- Years active: 2010s–present
- Known for: Unnecessary Inventions

YouTube information
- Channel: Unnecessary Inventions
- Years active: 2019–present
- Genres: Maker culture; Comedy; Product design
- Subscribers: 5.43 million
- Views: 4.09 billion
- Last updated: September 9, 2026
- Website: unnecessaryinventions.com

Matty Benedetto is an American product designer, inventor, and internet creator based in Burlington, Vermont. He is known for creating satirical product concepts under the brand Unnecessary Inventions, which he documents in short-form and long-form videos across social media platforms.

== Early life and education ==
Benedetto grew up in the suburbs of New York City. He moved to Vermont in 2008 to attend college and studied at Saint Michael's College in Colchester, Vermont.

== Career ==
=== Early business ventures ===
Before founding Unnecessary Inventions, Benedetto worked on consumer-product businesses spanning apparel, mobile accessories, and travel goods. He began with a crocheted ski-hat business later rebranded as Eastern Collective. In 2012, Eastern Collective introduced fabric-woven iPhone charging cables. Benedetto subsequently founded Sondre Travel, a travel-accessories business that used Kickstarter to fund product launches. As of June 2019, the company had completed five Kickstarter campaigns and had generated more than $325,000 in preorders.

=== Unnecessary Inventions ===
Benedetto began posting "unnecessary inventions" in 2019, starting with a concept known as "AirSticks," which he first shared on Reddit before building an audience on Instagram and YouTube. The brand's videos typically present humorous "solutions" to minor or invented inconveniences and are often styled as infomercials.

In 2019, Benedetto received a cease-and-desist letter from Crocs after posting a video in which he 3D-printed a parody product he called “Crocs Gloves” and used the company's name and logo. Benedetto removed the branding and renamed the item “Gator Grips.”

==== Monetization and brand partnerships ====
Benedetto's creator business draws revenue from platform advertising and sponsored work, with brand deals a significant component. Reported collaborations have included campaigns built around custom “inventions” for brands such as Canon, Dunkin’ Donuts, Call of Duty, and DoorDash.

==== Studio and production ====
Benedetto works from a 6,400-square-foot studio in Burlington, Vermont outfitted with a large array of fabrication tools and more than 20 3D printers (including a specialty “chocolate printer”). The space is set up to support rapid, one-off prototyping for on-camera demonstrations, with dedicated areas for electronics (soldering), general assembly, and video/lighting gear. On April 5, 2024, a fire occurred at Bernie Sanders' senatorial office in Burlington activating the sprinkler system in the building and damaging Unnecessary Studios with water damage.

== Recognition ==
Unnecessary Inventions was a nominee in the Science and Engineering category for the 11th Streamy Awards (2021).
