= Mason's Island =

Island in New London County, Connecticut, United States

- Location within Connecticut Location within the United States

Geography
- Location: Long Island Sound
- Coordinates: 41°19′56″N 71°58′5″W
- Area: 600 acres (240 ha)
- Length: 1.2 mi (1.9 km)
- Width: .8 mi (1.3 km)

Administration
- United States
- State: Connecticut
- County: New London
- City: Stonington

Demographics
- Population: 399 (2020)

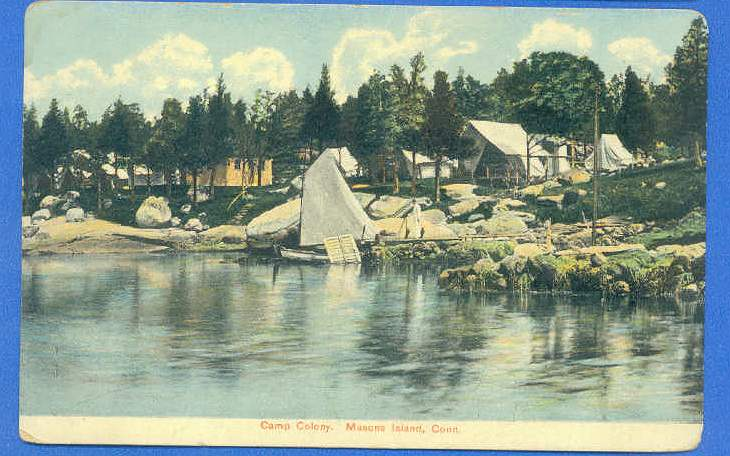
Mason's Island Camp Colony

Mason's Island (Algonquin: Chippachaug - meaning: a separated place) is an inhabited island at the mouth of the Mystic River, in Stonington, Connecticut. The island was named after Major John Mason who was granted the island in recognition for his military services in the 1637 Pequot War in nearby Mystic. This island remained in the Mason family for over 250 years, from 1651 to 1913. Since then the Allyn family have been stewards of it, and most of the island is owned by the Mason's Island Company and regulated by property deeds under the Mason's Island Property Owners Association (MIPOA). Mason's Island is connected to the mainland by a causeway.

The Mason's Island Marina and the Mystic River Marina are located on the north, public, end of the island. The southern half of the island is gated at 526 Masons Island Rd, and access to the Masons Island Yacht Club and further onto Enders Island is only by private road.

== Geography ==
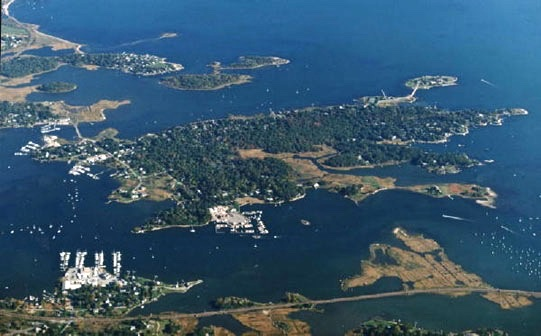
Mason's Island aerial view

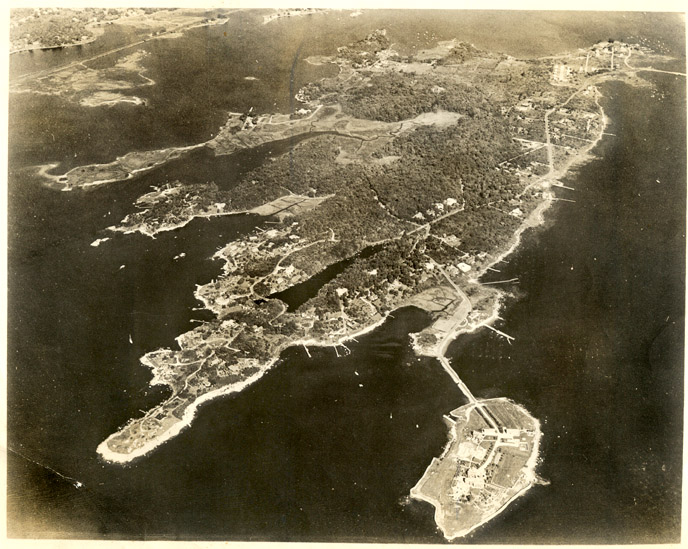
Mason's island circa 1950

The island is approximately 600 acres (240 ha) in area overall, being 1.2 miles (1.9 km) in length north-south and 0.8 miles (1.3 km) in width east-west and is formed by solid granite bedrock. A quarry supplying rough granite for breakwaters (e.g. at Newport, Rhode Island) was located at Pine Hill on the northwestern side of the island.

There is a 47-acre (19 ha) nature preserve located in about the middle of the island. This nature preserve features a large salt marsh with surrounding woods that can be accessed by multiple trails. In the southern end of the island there is a large fresh water pond that was formerly used for harvesting ice.

== Notable residents ==
- Beonne Boronda (1911–2012), sculptor, educator
- Lester D. Boronda (1886–1953), painter, furniture designer, sculptor
- Mary Wilkinson Streep (1915–2001), fine artist, editor, and mother of actress Meryl Streep

== See also ==
- Ram Island is an island located close to Mason's Island.
- Enders Island is an island connected to Mason's Island by a causeway.
- Fishers Island is an island located close to Mason's Island.
