= Roger Festa =

Roger R. Festa
- Born: September 6, 1950; Norwalk, Connecticut, U.S.
- Died: May 25, 2018; St. Louis, Missouri, U.S.

Roger R. Festa (September 6, 1950 - May 25, 2018) was a professor of chemistry at Truman State University in Kirksville, Missouri.

Festa graduated from the Christ the King Preparatory School in 1968, and completed his AB at Saint Michael's College, his Master of Arts at the University of Vermont, his PhD at the University of Connecticut, and post-doctoral study at Indiana University. Festa served as president of the American Institute of Chemists during 1996 and 1997, and on the AIC Board of Directors for 18 years, seven of which as an officer. He continued his service as a member of the board of trustees of the American Institute of Chemists Foundation. From 1980 to 1990, Festa served as an associate editor of the Journal of Chemical Education. His primary research interest was in the processes and outcomes of undergraduate chemistry education. Festa was also a member of Sigma Phi Epsilon fraternity, and served as the faculty advisor of the Missouri Mu chapter at Truman State University. He was also a member of the board of governors of the Sigma Phi Epsilon Educational Foundation. In 1985, Festa and H. David Wohlers established Truman's chapter of Alpha Chi Sigma, the co-ed professional fraternity in chemistry. Festa was an emeritus member of the Council of Scientific Society Presidents. Roger Festa died in St. Louis on May 25, 2018.
