= Edmundites =

Catholic religious congregation for men

Society of Saint Edmund
- Societas Patrum S. Edmundi (Latin)
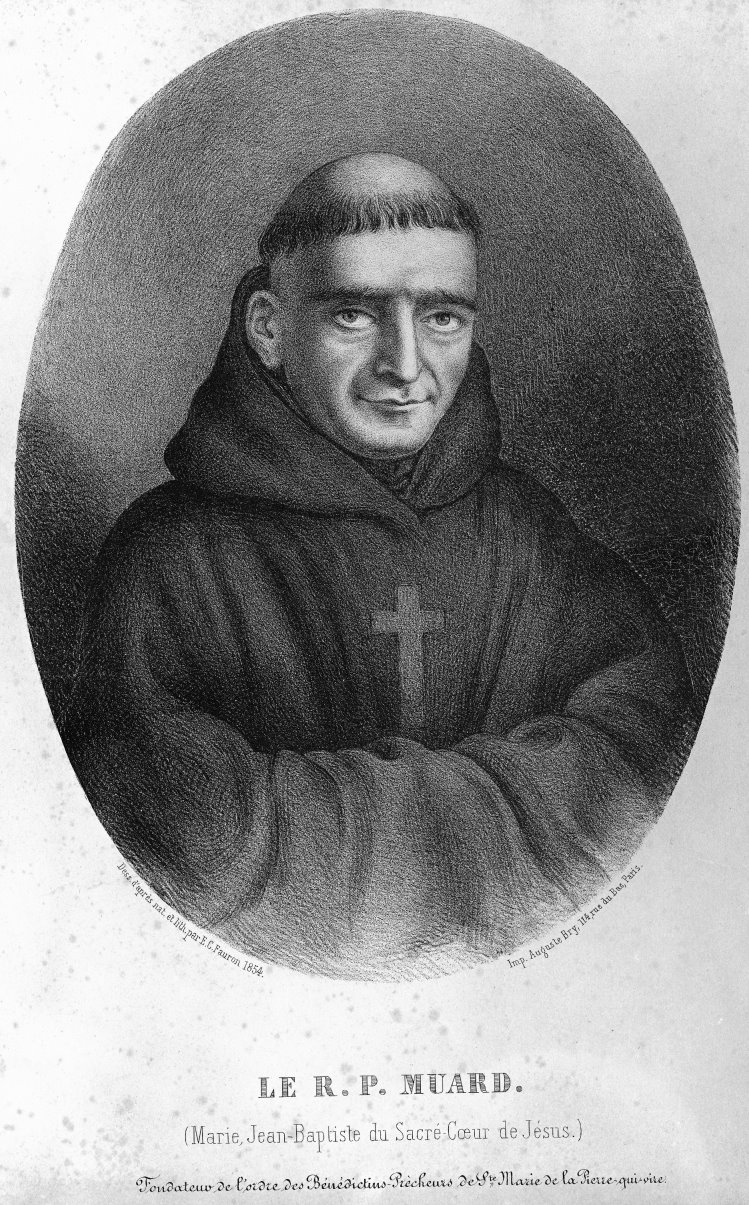
- Rev. Jean Baptiste Muard - Founder of the religious congregation Society of Saint Edmund
- Abbreviation: S.S.E. (post-nominal letters)
- Nickname: Edmundites
- Formation: 1843; 183 years ago
- Founder: Fr.Jean-Baptiste Muard, SSE
- Founded at: Pontigny, France
- Type: Clerical Religious Congregation of Pontifical Right for men
- Headquarters: Edmundite Generalate; 270 Winooski Park, Colchester, Vermont 05439, USA
- Members: 22 members (18 priests) as of 2020
- Motto: Latin: English: Do the best we can, with what little we have, to serve those most in need
- Superior General: Rev. Fr. David Cray, S.S.E.
- Patron saint: Saint Edmund of Canterbury
- Parent organization: Catholic Church
- Website: https://www.sse.org/

The Society of Saint Edmund (Latin: Societas Patrum S. Edmundi), also known as the Edmundites, is a Catholic clerical religious congregation of pontifical right for men founded in 1843 in Pontigny, France, by Jean Baptiste Muard. The congregation is named after Saint Edmund. The members of the congregation add the postnominal letters S.S.E.

In 2022, the congregation announced it would enter completion and no longer accept new members.

== Mission ==
The society was formed to keep St. Edmund's memory and life alive through faithful service, for the work of popular missions. The members also devote themselves to parochial work, to the education of youth in seminaries and colleges, to the direction of pious associations, and to foreign missions.

== History ==
Members of the Society, based in Pontigny, fled to the United States through Montreal, Canada in 1889 after widespread anticlericalism seized France. The Society of St. Edmund settled in Winooski, Vermont, and established Saint Michael's College in 1904. The original motherhouse is at Pontigny, but since the expulsion of the religious institutes the superior general first moved to Hitchin, England. The Edmundites gave up both the school and the parish in Hitchin in 1925 due to financial difficulties, relinquishing control to the Congregation of Augustinians of the Assumption.

In the early 20th century, the congregation had two houses in the United States: a missionary house and apostolic school at Swanton, Vermont, for the training of young men who wish to study for the priesthood and the religious life; and Saint Michael's College in Colchester, Vermont, with 12 fathers, 8 scholastics, and 100 pupils. Saint Michael's College has since expanded to 2,000 undergraduates and 650 graduate students.

In 1937 the Society turned to the missions of African Americans, mainly in Alabama, thanks to Fr Francis "Frank" Casey. During the civil rights movement and the lead up to the Selma to Montgomery marches, the Society was the only white group in Selma who openly supported the voting rights campaign. Student Nonviolent Coordinating Committee staff member Don Jelinek later described this order as "the unsung heroes of the Selma March... who provided the only integrated Catholic church in Selma, and perhaps in the entire Deep South".

In 1953, a Mrs. Alys VanGilder Enders gifted the 11 acres of Enders Island near Mystic, Connecticut to the then superior general of the Society, Fr Jeremiah Purtill, and there the Edmundites today operate a retreat center and art school.

In 2022, the congregation announced it would enter completion, no longer accepting new candidates.
