= Ram Island (Connecticut) =

Island in Connecticut, United States

- Location within Connecticut Location within the United States

Geography
- Location: Stonington, Connecticut, Long Island Sound
- Coordinates: 41°18′48″N 71°58′44″W
- Area: 20 acres (8.1 ha)

Administration
- United States
- State: Connecticut
- County: New London
- City: Stonington

Ram Island is a small 20-acre (81,000 m^{2}) island off the coast of Mystic, Connecticut. It is located in the Town of Stonington, approximately 1 mile (1.6 km) offshore, between Mystic and Fishers Island. Once called Mystic Island, it was formerly the site of an exclusive Victorian era hotel resort at which steamships from Boston and New York City stopped twice a day. At the height of its popularity, the hotel played host to a world lightweight bare-knuckle boxing championship. By the 1920s, the hotel had fallen into disrepair and was destroyed in the New England Hurricane of 1938. A motel was later built that catered to transient boaters.

The island has served as a seasonal private residence and farm since 1978. However, fires in February 2013 and March 2014 destroyed the barn and home.

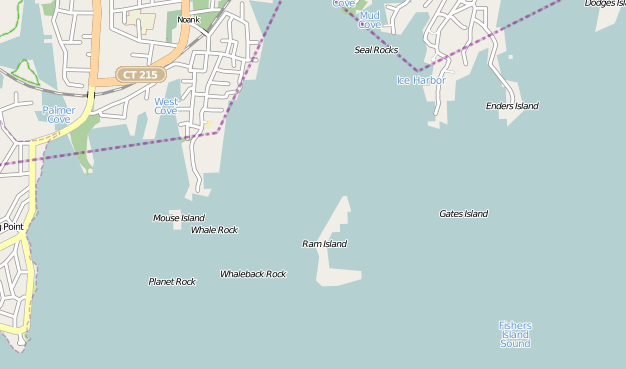
Ram Island's location south of Mystic, Connecticut

== See also ==
- The village of Noank, Connecticut is the nearest inhabited land, and also home to the namesake Ram Island Yacht Club.
- Mason's Island, Enders Island, North Dumpling Island, and Fishers Island, New York are nearby inhabited islands.
