= Robert Hoehl =

Robert "Bob" Hoehl (December 13, 1941 – November 7, 2010) was a co-founder of the software company IDX Systems and a Vermont philanthropist.

Born in Brooklyn, NY, Hoehl earned a basketball scholarship to Saint Michael's College in Colchester, Vermont, where he graduated in 1963 with a degree in mathematics. After working at IBM as a computer programmer, he founded Burlington Data Processing (BDP) in 1969 with Richard Tarrant. BDP ultimately changed its name to IDX Systems Corporation and became a leading provider of software to the health care industry. GE Healthcare purchased IDX in 2005 for $1.2 billion.

Hoehl and his wife Cynthia have supported many Vermont organizations, including Community Health Center of Burlington, Preservation Trust of Vermont, Newman Catholic Center at the University of Vermont, Lake Champlain Basin Science Center, Saint Michael's College, the Stern Center for Language and Learning the Boys and Girls Club, and Vermont's United Way. The Hoehls also funded the Hoehl Welcome Center at Saint Michael's College.

Hoehl died at his home in Ferrisburgh, Vermont in 2010 after a six-week hospitalization. He was married to Cynthia Hoehl (died 2016), who also had engaged in philanthropic work in Vermont.
