= Soisy-Bouy =

- Commune
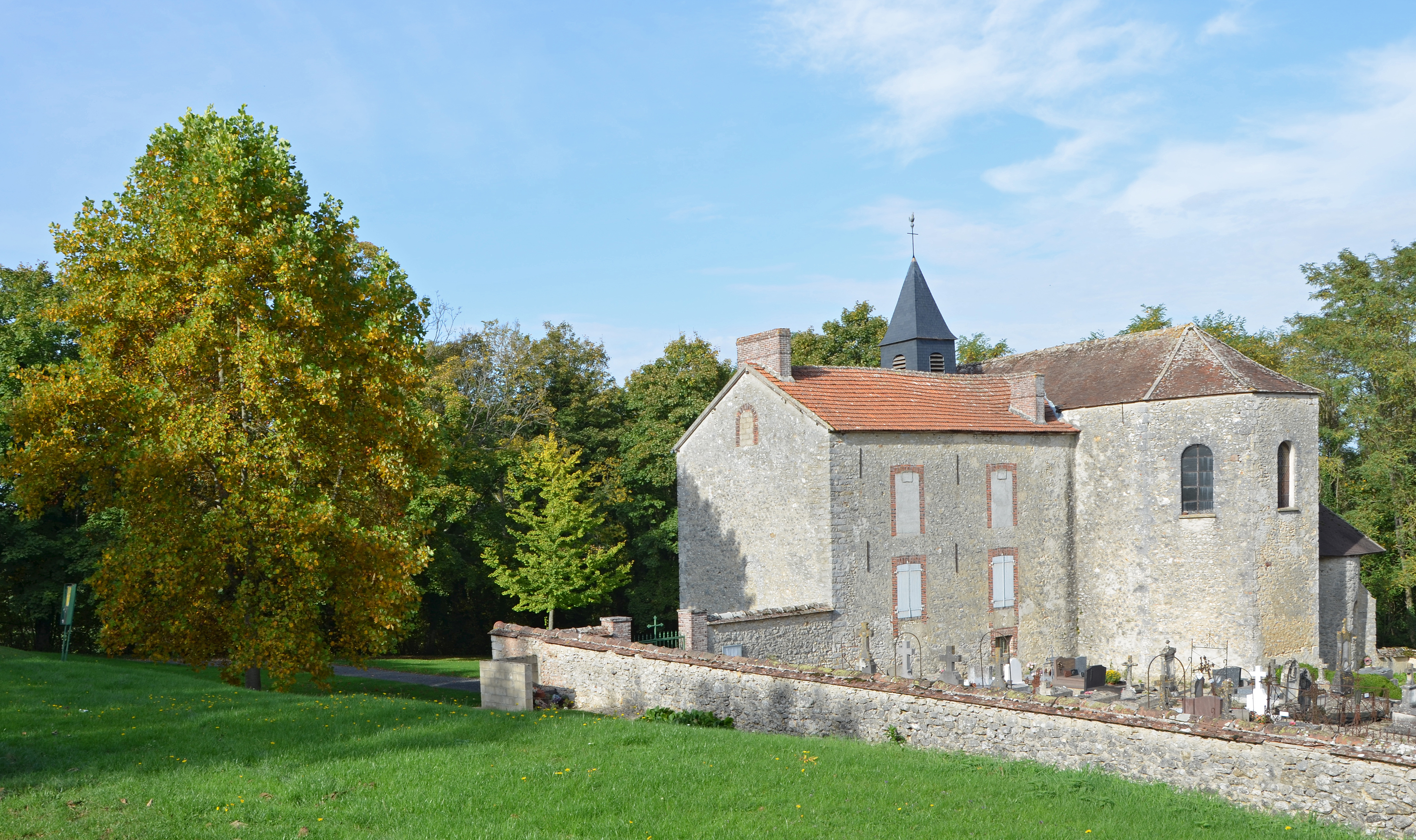
- The church in Soisy-Bouy

- Coat of arms
- Location of Soisy-Bouy
- Location within France Location within Île-de-France (region)
- Coordinates: 48°30′40″N 3°17′44″E
- Country: France
- Region: Île-de-France
- Department: Seine-et-Marne
- Arrondissement: Provins
- Canton: Provins
- Intercommunality: Provinois

Government
  - Mayor (2020–2026): Jean-Patrick Sottiez
- Area^{1}: 11.34 km^{2} (4.38 sq mi)
- Highest elevation: 162 m (531 ft)
- Lowest elevation: 71 m (233 ft)
- Population (2023): 850
  - Density: 75/km^{2} (190/sq mi)
- Time zone: UTC+01:00 (CET)
  - Summer (DST): UTC+02:00 (CEST)
- INSEE/Postal code: 77456 /77650
- ^{1} French Land Register data, which excludes lakes, ponds, glaciers > 1 km^{2} (0.386 sq mi or 247 acres) and river estuaries.

Soisy-Bouy (French pronunciation: [swazi bwi]) is a commune in the Seine-et-Marne department in the Île-de-France region in north-central France.

== History ==
On 16 November 1240, Edmund Rich (1175–1240), also known as Saint Edmund or Eadmund of Canterbury, and as Saint Edmund of Abingdon, a 13th-century archbishop of Canterbury in England, died here at the house of Augustinian Canons.

== Demographics ==
Inhabitants of Soisy-Bouy are called Bouyards. As of 2023, the population of the commune was 850.

== See also ==
- Communes of the Seine-et-Marne department
