= Saint Michael's College =

Private Catholic college in Colchester, Vermont, U.S.

- Former name: Saint Michael's Institute (1904–1937)
- Motto: Quis ut Deus
- Motto in English: Who is like God
- Type: Private college
- Established: 1904; 122 years ago
- Accreditation: NECHE
- Religious affiliation: Roman Catholic (Society of Saint Edmund)
- Academic affiliations: NAICU; ACCU
- Endowment: $95.45 million (2024)
- President: Richard Plumb
- Faculty: 104 full-time, 64 part-time
- Students: 1,323 (fall 2024)
- Undergraduates: 1,120 (fall 2024)
- Postgraduates: 203 (fall 2024)
- Location: Colchester, Vermont, U.S. 44.4947°N 73.1653°W
- Campus: Suburban, 440 acres (180 ha)
- Colors: Purple and gold
- Nickname: Purple Knights
- Sporting affiliations: NCAA Division II – NE10 - EISA - NEWHA
- Website: smcvt.edu
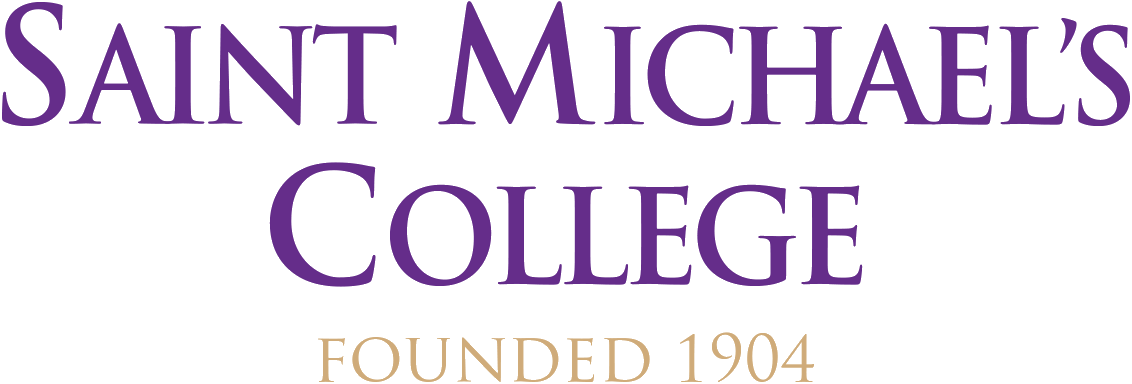

Saint Michael's College (St. Mikes) is a private Catholic college in Colchester, Vermont, United States. Founded in 1904 by the Society of Saint Edmund, it grants Bachelor of Arts and Bachelor of Science degrees to about 1,100 undergraduate students and Master's degrees and certificates to about 200 graduate students. Undergraduate housing availability is guaranteed for all four years and 94% of students live on campus.

== History ==
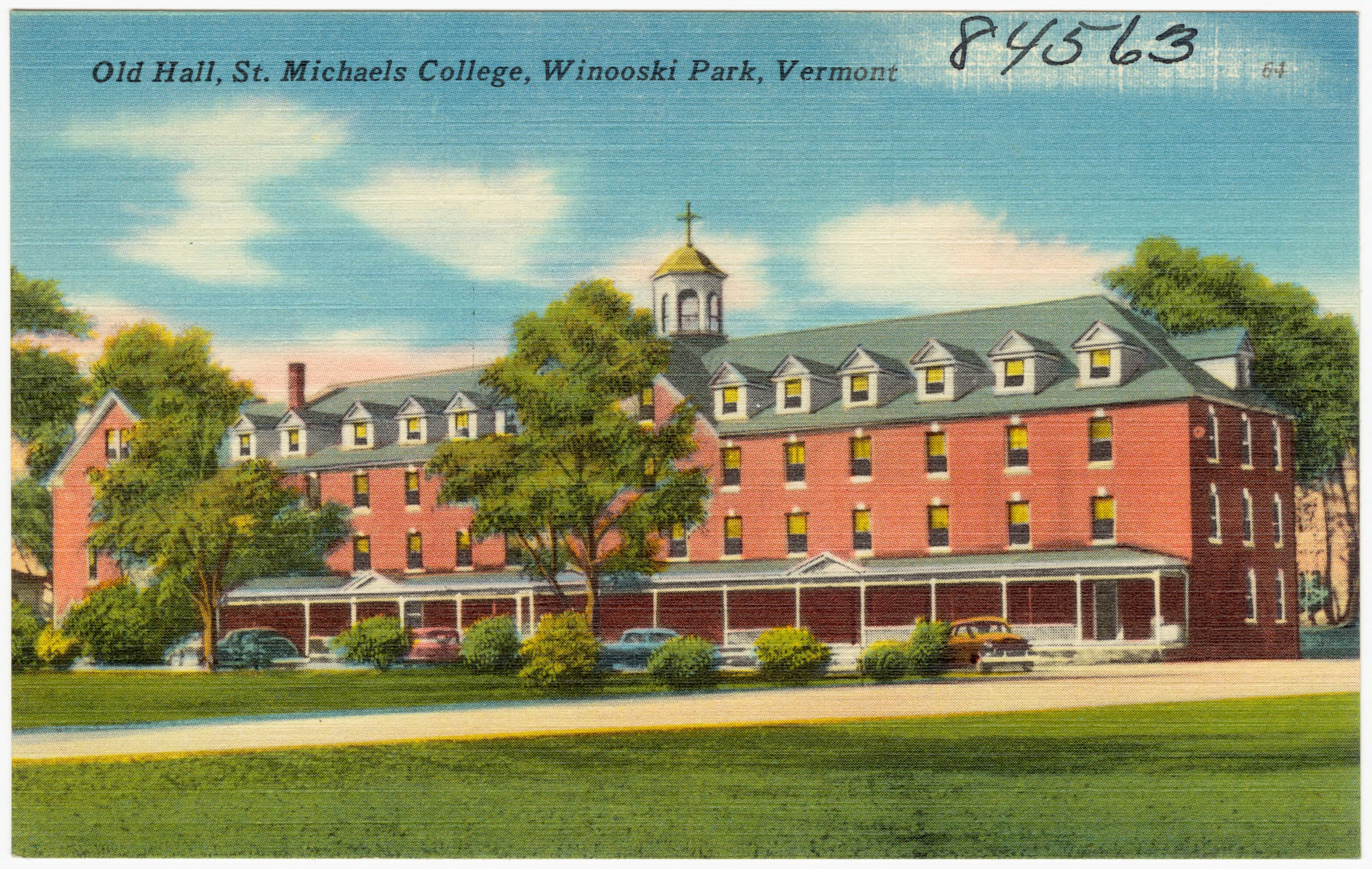
Old Hall between circa 1930 and 1945

In 1889, priests from the Society of Saint Edmund fled to the United States after widespread anti-clericalism swept France. In 1904, they opened Saint Michael's Institute with an initial investment of $5,000. Thirty-four students aged 10 to 22 enrolled, with a tuition and board fee of $105. Slowly, the school discontinued its high school program and the school transitioned from an academy to a traditional residential college. In 1939, graduate programs were offered for the first time.

Saint Michael's Playhouse was opened in 1947, bringing professional summer theater to Vermont and giving students the chance to work behind the scenes.

Before the 1950s, classes at Saint Michael's were small, with just a few dozen Michaelmen in any class. In the 1950s, the college expanded to hundreds of students per class. To manage the influx of GI Bill students after World War II, Saint Michael's acquired temporary housing in the form of military barracks from Fort Ethan Allen in Colchester.

In the 1950s, freshmen were required to wear a dress shirt, coat, and tie to every class and for the evening meal. All dorm students said the rosary before retiring.

About 130 refugees from the Hungarian Revolution of 1956 came to the college. Most of them, already well-educated, came to learn English.

In April 1970, the board of trustees approved a proposal by then-president Bernard Boutin, the institution's first lay president, to transition the college to a coeducational institution. In 1972, the first four female graduates of Saint Michael's received their degrees.

=== Presidents ===
1. Amand Prével (1904–1907)
2. Ernest M. Salmon (1907–1913)
3. Edmund M. Total (1913–1919)
4. William Jeanmarie (1919–1931)
5. Eugene Alliot (1931–1934)
6. Leon E. Gosselin (1934–1940)
7. James H. Petty (1940–1946)
8. Daniel P. Lyons (1946–1952)
9. Francis E. Moriarty (1952–1958)
10. Gerald E. Dupont (1958–1969)
11. Bernard L. Boutin (1969–1974)
12. Francis E. Moriarty (1974–1976)
13. Edward L. Henry (1976–1985)
14. Paul J. Reiss (1985–1996)
15. Marc A. vanderHeyden (1996–2007)
16. John J. Neuhauser (2007–2018)
17. Lorraine Sterritt (2018–2023)
18. Richard Plumb (2023–present)

== Campus ==
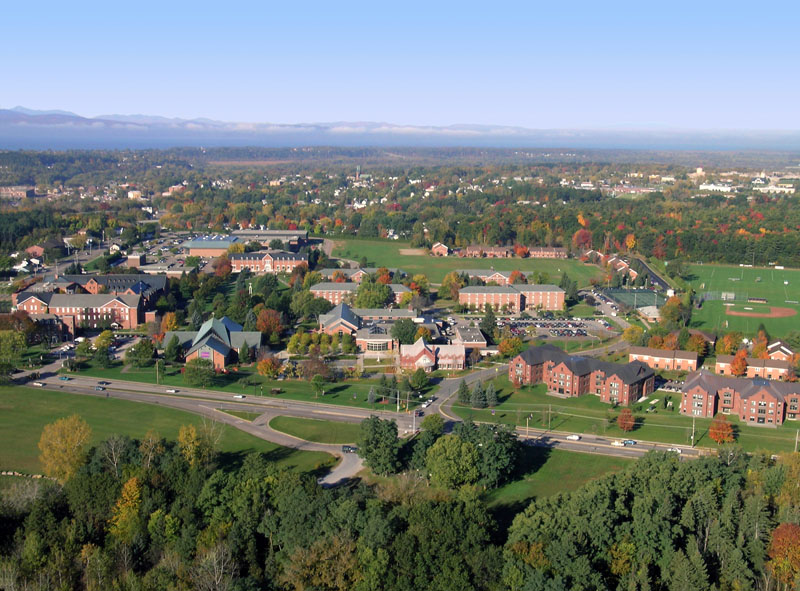
Aerial shot of the main campus

The college consists of two campuses, the Main (also called South) and the North.

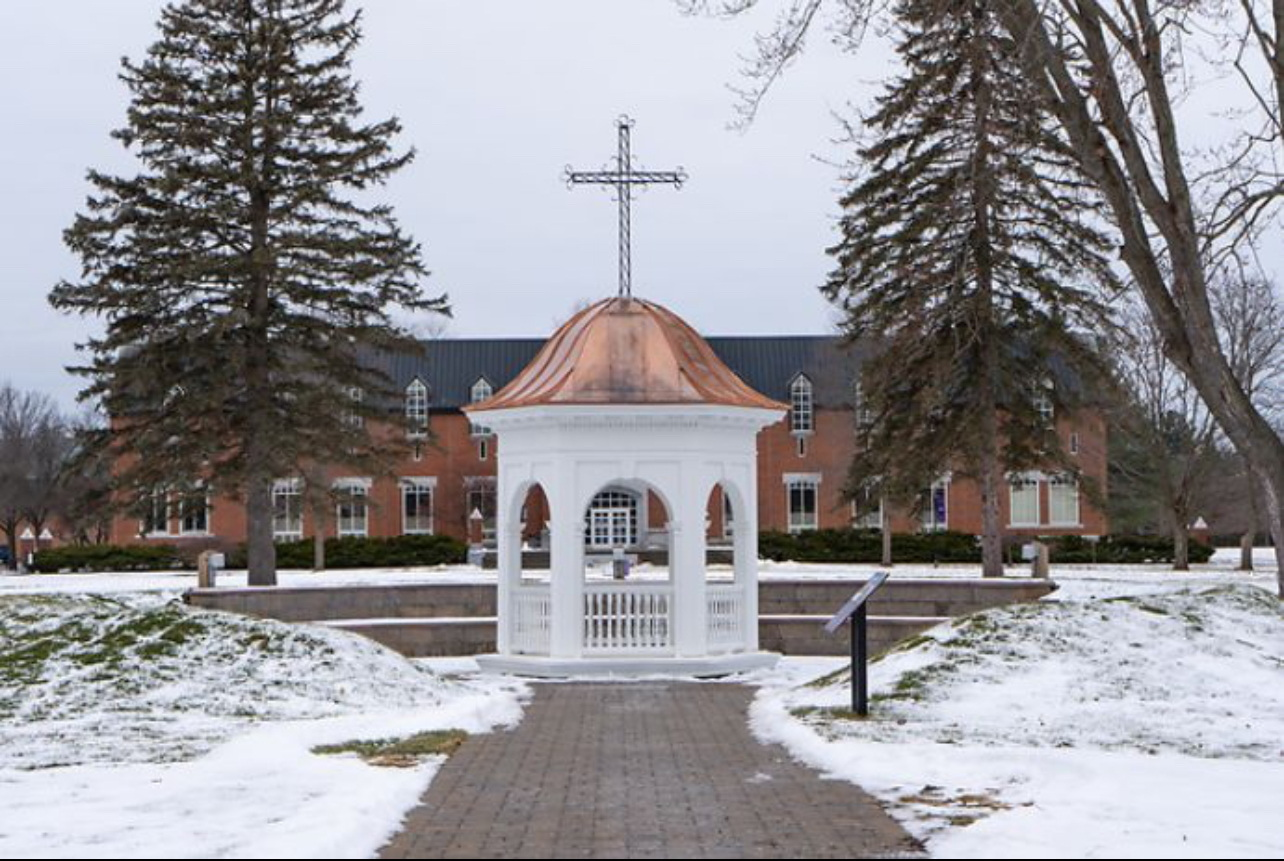
Founder's Hall Cupula, post-restoration and re-installation on campus.

The main campus is the original and largest, with most of the classrooms, administration buildings, and residence halls. The Quad is anchored by Durick Library to the west and the Chapel of Saint Michael the Archangel to the east. The three academic halls, Cheray Hall, Jeanmarie Hall, and Saint Edmund's Hall, along with the McCarthy Arts Center line the Quad to the south. The Alliot Student Center and the four underclass residence halls wall the Quad on the north.

=== Sustainability ===
Saint Michael's has taken many steps towards sustainability over the years. It was named the first fair trade school in Vermont. Along with the initiatives in the cafeteria, Saint Michael's has an organic garden that started in 2008 and has grown into a huge project for students and faculty alike. The garden utilizes student volunteers through the Mobilization of Volunteer Efforts (MOVE) program and also works with summer interns and crew members to prepare the vegetables for Farm Stands that run from mid-summer through the beginning of fall. The school also provides a free CCTA (Chittenden County Transportation Authority Bus Route) commuter pass to all students, staff, and faculty. To improve water conservation, dual-flush handles for toilets have begun to be installed in various buildings around campus. All campus showerheads and sink aerators are low-flow. Saint Michael's College also took the St. Francis Pledge, a promise, and commitment by Catholic individuals, families, parishes, organizations, and institutions to live their faith by protecting the environment and advocating on behalf of people in poverty who face the harshest impacts of global climate change. As part of the college's ban on bottled water, the Office of Sustainability has installed several water bottle fill stations throughout campus, allowing students to more easily use their reusable water bottles.

=== Housing ===
Undergraduate students at Saint Michael's College are guaranteed housing for the duration of their 4-year programs. First-year students typically live in one of five dorm buildings, with the majority living in double-style rooms with shared common areas and a limited number (including some designated for Honors and LGBTQ+ students) in suite-style apartments. Sophomores and juniors usually live in one of five suite-style dorms and share a living room and bathroom with 3-7 other students. Seniors live in one of these suite-style buildings, or in one of four townhouse communities on campus where they will share a four-bedroom townhome with three other students.

== Academics ==
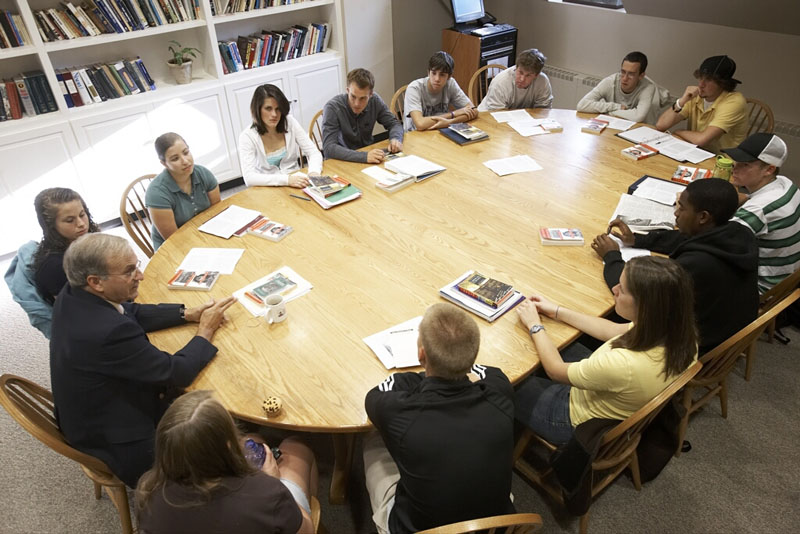
Students gather in a classroom for First-Year Seminar.

Classes are small and hands-on learning is emphasized, with a student-to-faculty ratio of 10:1 Saint Michael's houses the following honors: Phi Beta Kappa; Delta Epsilon Sigma, the Catholic honor society; Pi Sigma Alpha for Political Science; Omicron Delta Epsilon for Economics; Phi Alpha Theta for History; Kappa Delta Pi for Education; Psi Chi for Psychology; Sigma Xi for Science and Technology; Pi Mu Epsilon for Mathematics; Beta Beta Beta for Biology; Kappa Tau Alpha for Journalism and Mass Communication (the only KTA chapter nationwide housed at a small college); and Sigma Beta Delta for Business, Management, and Administration. Four Saint Michael's professors have been named the CASE/Carnegie Foundation Vermont Professor of the Year. Saint Michael's College is accredited by the New England Commission of Higher Education.

=== Undergraduate ===
Undergraduate programs include over 40 majors and minors, combined with a liberal studies curriculum and experiential learning requirement. Emphasis is placed on independent study, independent research, internships, and foreign study. Eligible students can also participate in the college's Honors Program. The most popular undergraduate majors at Saint Michael's College, based on 2024 graduates, were:

- Business Administration & Management (59)
- Psychology (45)
- Biology/Biological Sciences (22)
- Environmental Science (15)
- English Language and Literature (15)
- Health Services/Allied Health/Health Sciences (14)

=== Study abroad ===
Students may participate in study abroad programs, which cost the same as a semester on campus. Students can choose from over 100 different programs located around the globe and can choose a program by location or language, or from a variety of special Saint Michael's programs. Over a third of students choose to study abroad.

== Culture ==
Nearly 100% of St. Mike's students live on campus in residence halls and townhouses. The campus has over 40 student organizations. There are no fraternities or sororities. Other activities include Saint Michael's Fire and Rescue student volunteer first responders, Student Association, Adventure Sports Program, Campus Ministry, the campus radio station WWPV, club sports, student musical and play production, Vermont Gregorian Chant Schola, open mic nights and various instrumental and vocal ensembles. Christmas and spring semi-formal dances are held. Athletics facilities include a fitness room, racquetball and an indoor track and swimming pool. Trails surround the campus for cross-country running or mountain biking.

=== Athletics ===
There are 21 varsity sports (10 for men, 11 for women) and over 20 intramural teams. Saint Michael's varsity sports teams are called the Purple Knights. The school colors are purple and gold. Eighteen varsity teams participate in the NCAA's Division II Northeast-10 Conference; Alpine and Nordic skiing are members of the multi-divisional Eastern Intercollegiate Ski Association (EISA), and women’s ice hockey competes in Division I New England Women's Hockey Alliance. Approximately 25% of students participate in a varsity sport. For men: Baseball, basketball, cross country, golf, ice hockey, lacrosse, skiing (Alpine and Nordic), soccer, swimming & diving, and tennis. For women: basketball, cross country, field hockey, ice hockey, lacrosse, skiing, soccer, softball, swimming & diving, tennis, and volleyball. Student-led programs include men's and women's rugby, billiards, ping pong, floor hockey, volleyball, and indoor soccer. Tournaments are also scheduled throughout the academic year. Yoga, jazzercise, kickboxing, cardio step, and pilates courses are offered weekly. First Aid and CPR training/certification is also offered.

=== Saint Michael's Playhouse ===
Saint Michael's Playhouse is the college's professional equity summer theater. The Playhouse is a member of the Council of Resident Stock Theaters (CORST). As a CORST theater company, Saint Michael's Playhouse employs members of Actors' Equity Association, as well as directors from the Stage Directors and Choreographers Society and designers from United Scenic Artists.

=== Clubs and organizations ===
Saint Michael's offers over 30 different student-run clubs and organizations. Clubs range from the arts (e.g. A cappella groups, Drama Club, etc) to community groups (e.g. Common Ground, Cultures of our Kitchen (COOK), Student Global AIDS Campaign) to academic clubs (e.g. The Defender, French Club, Onion River Review).

The campus also offers various club sports such as dance, rugby (men's and women's), ultimate frisbee and the Gamer's Guild.

Turtle Underground is a student-run program that promotes student art, music, and performance. There are shows on most Saturdays during the semester. These have featured a variety of acts, ranging from DJs to solo singer-songwriters to jam bands.

Student publications include The Defender, a weekly newspaper, and the Onion River Review, a literary magazine.

=== Adventure Sports Center ===
The Adventure Sports Center (ASC) at Saint Michael's College features hiking, rock climbing, ice climbing, snowshoeing, kayaking, and skiing. The ASC also offers a season pass to Sugarbush.

== Notable alumni and students ==
- Moses Anderson 1954, Roman Catholic bishop
- Tim Arango 1996, Baghdad bureau chief of The New York Times
- Tom Bowman 1977, National Public Radio's Pentagon reporter
- Frederick M. "Skip" Burkle Jr 1961, humanitarian assistance and disaster response specialist
- Tom Caron, host of Boston Red Sox coverage on NESN
- Donald Cook, United States Marine Corps officer, prisoner of war, and Medal of Honor recipient
- Thomas W. Costello 1968, Vermont House of Representatives
- Ann Cummings MSA 1989, mayor of Montpelier, Vermont, and member of the Vermont Senate
- Rudolph J. Daley (attended), Associate Justice of the Vermont Supreme Court
- Thomas E. Delahanty II 1967, Maine Superior Court justice
- Joseph F. Dunford Jr. 1977, 19th Chairman of the Joint Chiefs of Staff and 36th Commandant of the Marine Corps
- James Fallon 1969, neuroscientist
- Roger Festa 1972, chemistry professor at Truman State University, former president of the American Institute of Chemists
- Michael J. Fitzpatrick, New York State Assemblyman representing the 7th district in Suffolk County
- Tom Freston 1967, former president and CEO of Viacom and one of the founders of MTV
- Robert Hoehl 1963, co-founder of IDX Systems Corporation
- Martin Hyun 2003, author, professional ice hockey player with Deutsche Eishockey Liga, 2018 PyeongChang Winter Olympics Deputy Sport Manager
- Vincent Illuzzi 1975, youngest person ever elected to Vermont State Senate, state senator 1981-2013
- Brian Kelley, CIA officer
- George Latimer, DFL mayor of Saint Paul, Minnesota
- Patrick Leahy 1961, senior U.S. senator from Vermont
- Bernard Joseph Leddy, former United States federal judge
- Earle B. McLaughlin (attended), U.S. Marshal for Vermont
- Robert W. Parker, United States Air Force major general
- Christina Reiss 1984, federal judge for the United States District Court for the District of Vermont
- Harold C. Sylvester (attended), judge of the Vermont Superior Court, Associate Justice of the Vermont Supreme Court
- Richard Tarrant 1965, co-founder of IDX Systems Corporation
- Michael Tranghese, former commissioner of the Big East Conference
- Loung Ung 1993, human-rights activist, lecturer, author of First They Killed My Father.
- Travis Warech (attended; born 1991), American-German-Israeli basketball player for Israeli team Hapoel Be'er Sheva
- Michael William Warfel G 1990, prelate of the Roman Catholic Church, seventh and current Bishop of Great Falls-Billings.
- Robert White, president of the Center for International Policy, former US Ambassador to El Salvador and Paraguay
- Katjana Ballantyne, 36th mayor of Somerville, Massachusetts
- Matty Benedetto 2012, product designer and inventor; creator of Unnecessary Inventions

== Notable faculty ==
- John Engels, professor of English
- Greg Delanty, professor of English
- Jim Hefferon, professor of Mathematics

== See also ==
- List of colleges and universities in the United States
- List of colleges and universities in Vermont
