= Elihu Island =

Island in New London County, Connecticut, United States

Coordinates: 41.336°N 71.888°W

Elihu Island is a private island off the coast of Stonington, Connecticut. It is located in Wequetequock Cove, just southwest of Goat Island and northeast of the western tip of Sandy Point Island. It has been variously known as Ledward or Ledward's Island, Elihu's or Elihue's Island, Elihu Chesebrough's Island, and Freeman's Island.

The island, which has a handful of buildings, has been used for weddings. Its sole road is Elihu Island Road, which provides access to the mainland via a causeway. The road crosses one of the last remaining level crossings on the Northeast Corridor. The island is owned by the private Elihu Island Trust, associated with the Wesson and Benchley families. Peter Benchley lived on the island when writing Jaws and several of his other works.
