= Goat Island (Connecticut) =

Island in New London County, Connecticut, United States

- Interactive map of Goat Island

Geography
- Location: Wequetequock Cove
- Coordinates: 41°20′27.36″N 71°53′07.25″W

Administration
- United States
- State: Connecticut
- County: New London County
- Town: Stonington

Goat Island is part of Stonington, Connecticut, in Wequetequock Cove. It is just northeast of Elihu Island, and is also close to the coast along the Northeast Corridor. Sandy Point Island is nearby southwest along Little Narragansett Bay.
