= IDX Systems =

Defunct US health care software technology company

IDX Systems Corporation (IDX) was a healthcare software technology company that formerly had headquarters in South Burlington, Vermont, United States. It was founded in 1969 by Robert Hoehl, Richard Tarrant, and Paul Egerman. IDX was acquired by General Electric and incorporated into its GE Healthcare business unit in 2006. A portion of the former IDX business (along with other software assets) were sold by GE to private equity firm Veritas Capital in 2018. The resulting company was named Virence. In 2019, Virence was merged into athenahealth.

== Products ==
Prior to its acquisition by GE Healthcare, IDX had four primary lines of business:

Flowcast was the original application produced by IDX. It is a revenue cycle management system for medium to large physician groups, hospitals, and integrated delivery networks, and includes scheduling, billing and collections modules. It is written in the MUMPS programming language and runs on InterSystems Caché. Flowcast was renamed Centricity Business after the product was acquired by GE Healthcare. The product is now owned by athenahealth.

Groupcast was a financial management system for smaller-to-medium size provider groups. It was renamed Centricity Group Management after being acquired by GE Healthcare. The product is now owned by athenahealth.

Carecast was a system used primarily by large hospitals and medical centers as an integrated clinical and financial application. Known as "Lastword" before IDX re-branded it, the system was developed in the 1980s by Seattle-based PHAMIS, Inc., a company acquired by IDX in 1997. Carecast also came in a regionalized version currently used at the University College Hospital in London. The main Carecast code-base is written in COBOL, TAL, C and Java and runs on Tandem/NonStop Tandem Computers hardware. Upon acquisition by GE Healthcare, it was renamed Centricity Enterprise. In 2015, GE Healthcare announced it would sunset the Centricity Enterprise product.

Imagecast was a radiology information system which enables "filmless" radiology image workflow. It is now marketed and supported by GE as Centricity RIS-IC.

== GE buyout ==
On September 29, 2005, General Electric's Healthcare division announced it would acquire IDX for US$44 a share. The deal was valued at US$1.2 billion. The purchase was finalized January 4, 2006.
