= Pontigny =

- Commune
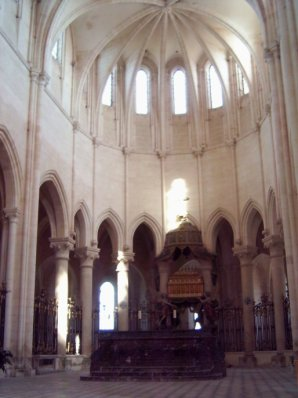
- Choir of the abbey church

- Coat of arms
- Location of Pontigny
- Location within France Location within Bourgogne-Franche-Comté
- Coordinates: 47°54′28″N 3°42′42″E
- Country: France
- Region: Bourgogne-Franche-Comté
- Department: Yonne
- Arrondissement: Auxerre
- Canton: Chablis
- Area^{1}: 11.92 km^{2} (4.60 sq mi)
- Highest elevation: 183 m (600 ft)
- Lowest elevation: 102 m (335 ft)
- Population (2023): 752
  - Density: 63.1/km^{2} (163/sq mi)
- Time zone: UTC+01:00 (CET)
  - Summer (DST): UTC+02:00 (CEST)
- INSEE/Postal code: 89307 /89230
- ^{1} French Land Register data, which excludes lakes, ponds, glaciers > 1 km^{2} (0.386 sq mi or 247 acres) and river estuaries.

Pontigny (French pronunciation: [pɔ̃tiɲi]) is a commune in the Yonne department in Bourgogne-Franche-Comté in north-central France.

== Sight ==
Its principal distinction is as the home of Pontigny Abbey.

== Communication channels ==
The commune is crossed in a north-south direction by the N77 joining Auxerre to the south and Saint-Florentin and Troyes to the north, and by the D91 connecting Migennes to the west and Chablis to the south-east.

Exit 20 (“ Venoy ”) of the A6 motorway is 16 km to the south, exit 19 (“ Monéteau ”) is 19 km to the southwest.

The nearest train stations are Laroche - Migennes (the best served) 18 km away and Auxerre 19 km

== See also ==
- Communes of the Yonne department
