= Contrecœur (disambiguation) =

Contrecœur is a city in Quebec, Canada.

Contrecœur may also refer to:

- Antoine Pécaudy de Contrecœur (1596–1688)
- François-Antoine Pécaudy de Contrecœur (c. 1676 – 1743)
- Claude-Pierre Pécaudy de Contrecœur (1705–1775)
