= Megaphone =

Portable or hand-held device to amplify voices and sounds

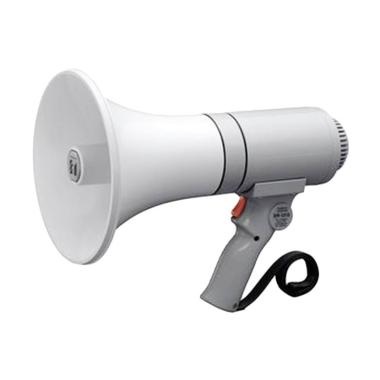
A megaphone

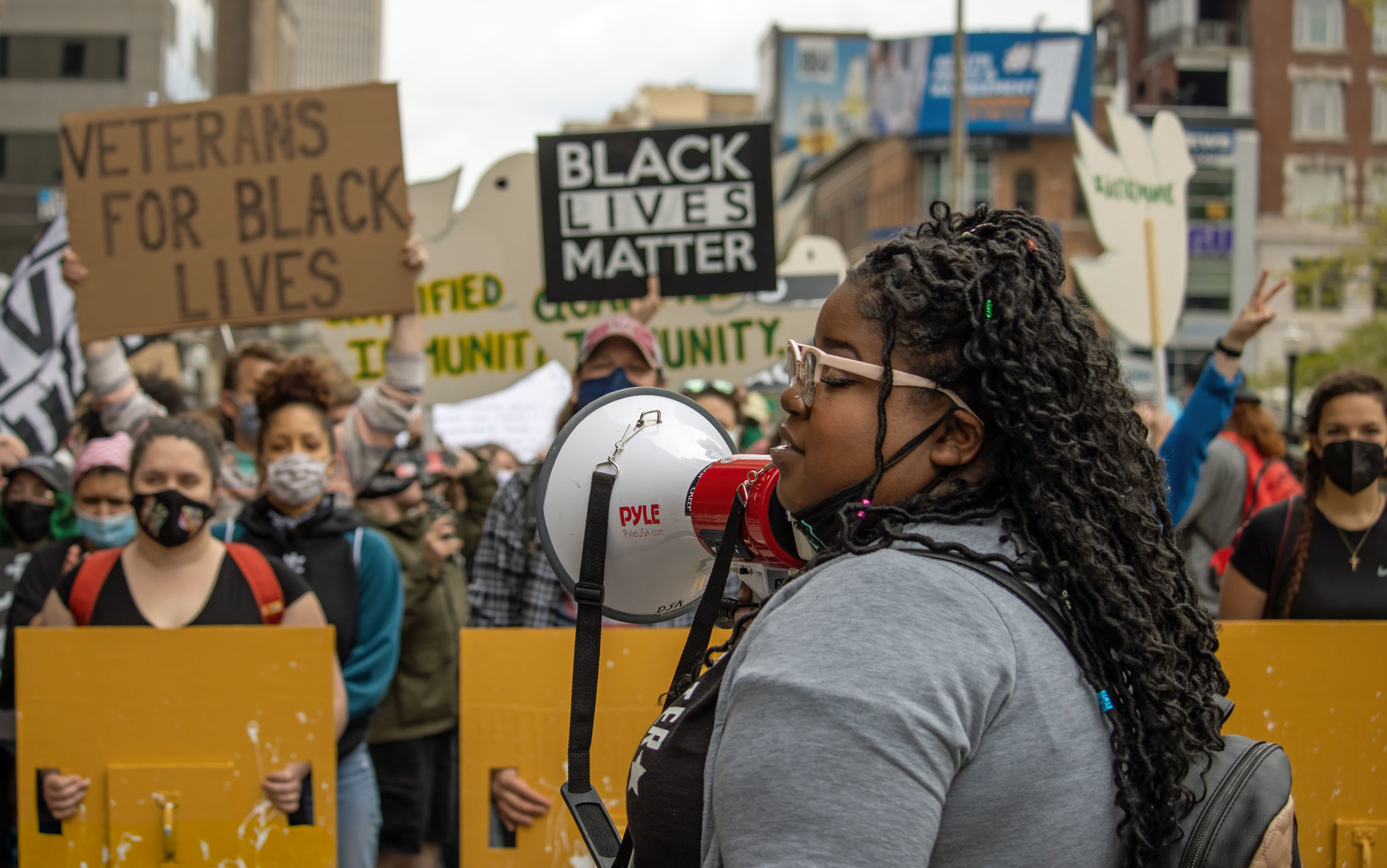
An electric megaphone is used at a protest (Black Lives Matter, July 2021)

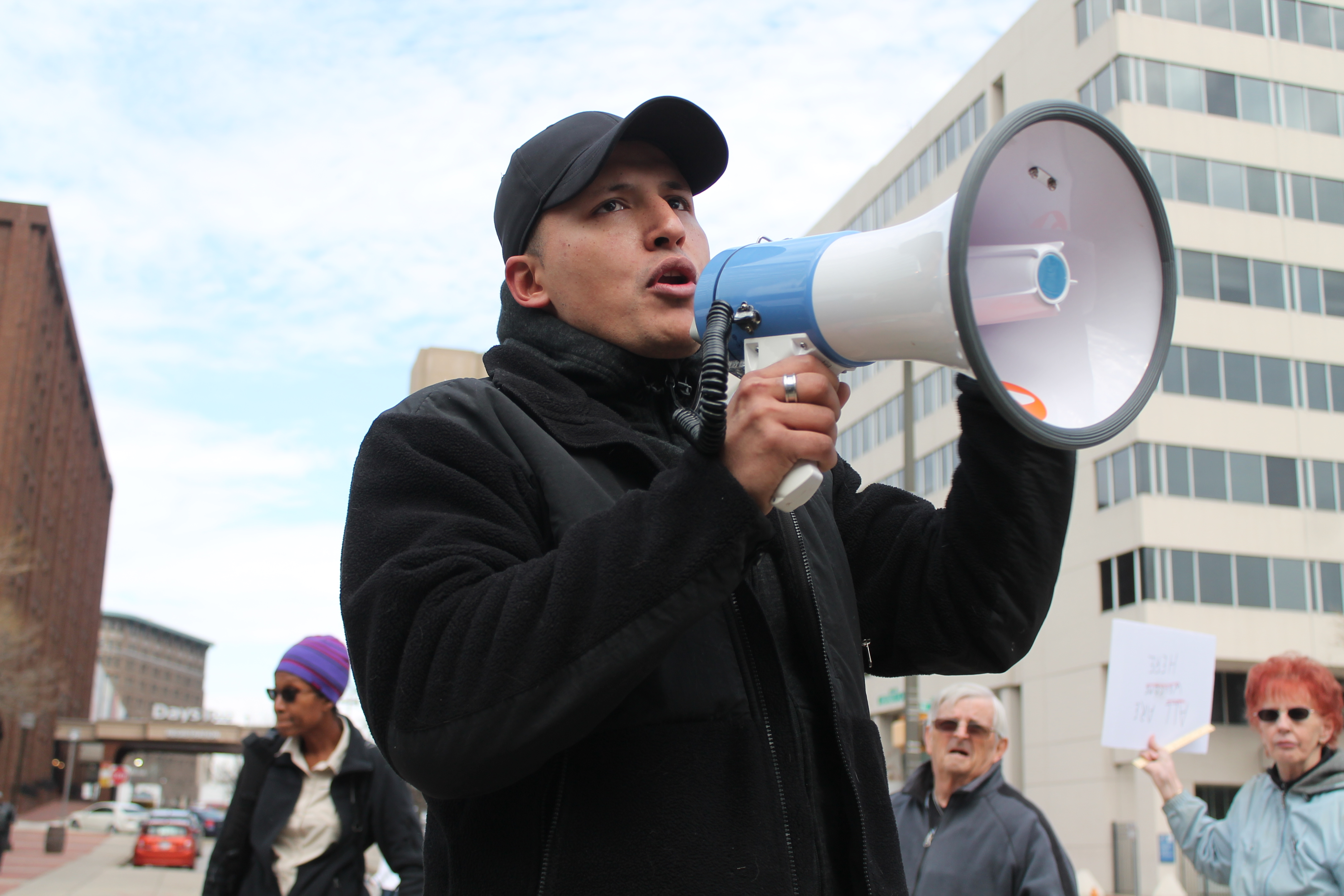
An electric megaphone is used at a protest (Fight Trump, February 2018)

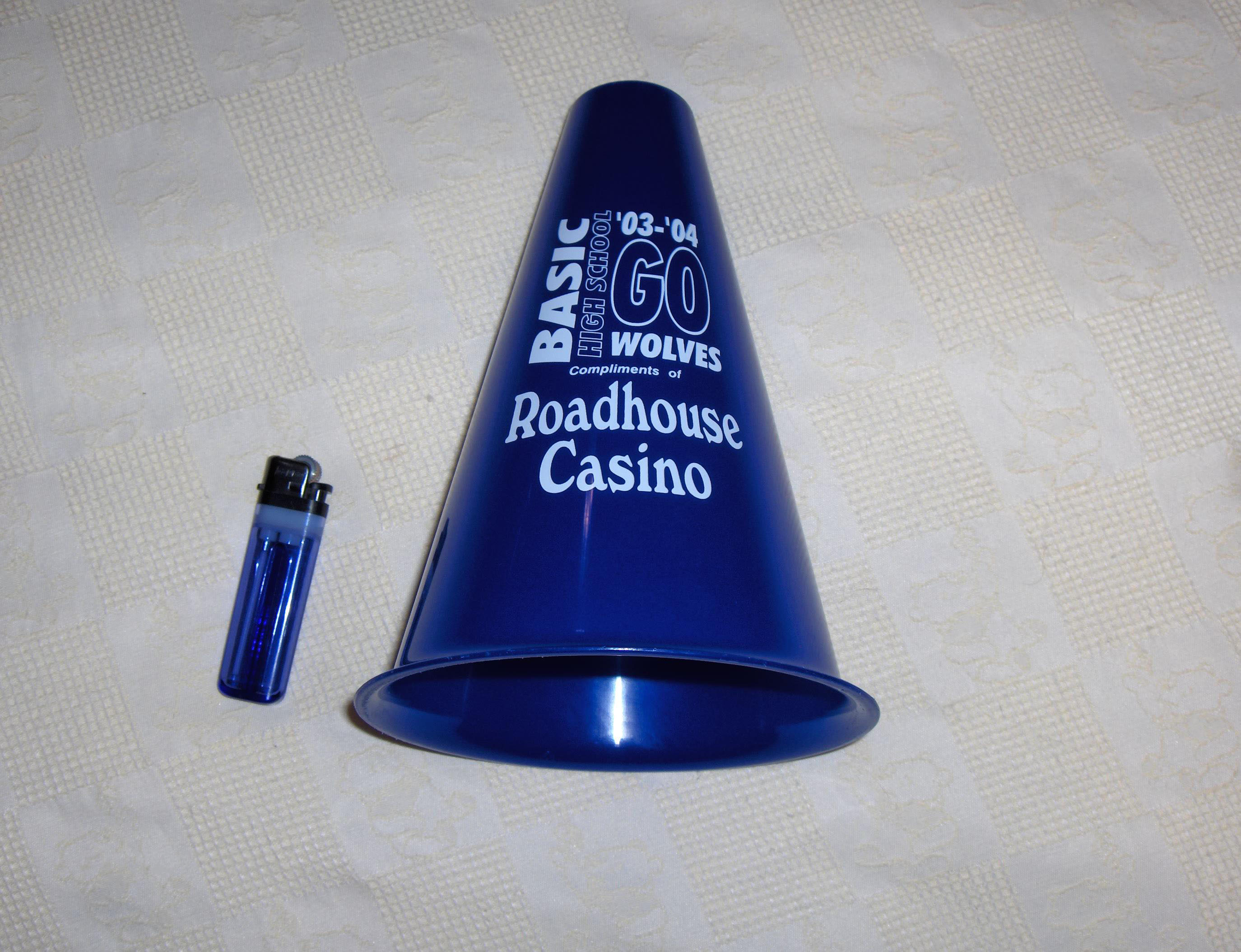
A small sports megaphone for cheering at sporting events, next to a 75 mm cigarette lighter for scale

A megaphone, speaking trumpet, bullhorn, blowhorn, or loudhailer is usually a portable or hand-held, cone-shaped acoustic horn used to amplify a person's voice or other sounds and direct it in a given direction. The sound is introduced into the narrow end of the megaphone, by holding it up to the face and speaking into it, and the sound waves radiate out the wide end. A megaphone increases the volume of sound by increasing the acoustic impedance seen by the vocal cords, matching the impedance of the vocal cords to the air, so that more sound power is radiated. It also serves to direct the sound waves in the direction the horn is pointing. It somewhat distorts the sound of the voice because the frequency response of the megaphone is greater at higher sound frequencies.

Since the 1960s the voice-powered acoustic megaphone described above has been replaced by the electric megaphone, which uses a microphone, an electrically-powered amplifier and a folded horn loudspeaker to amplify the voice.

== History ==
Before it became a megaphone, the bull horn or cow horn or steer horn was a signaling device or bugle used from antiquity.

The initial inventor of the speaking trumpet is a subject of historical controversy. There have been references to speakers in Ancient Greece (5th Century B.C.) wearing masks with cones protruding from the mouth in order to amplify their voices in theatres. Hellenic architects may have also consciously utilized acoustic physics in their design of theatre amphitheaters.

A drawing by Louis Nicolas on page 14 of the Codex canadensis, circa 1675 to 1682, shows a Native American chief named Iscouakité using a megaphone made of birch bark. The text of the illustration says that he is addressing his soldiers through a birch bark tube.

Both Samuel Morland and Athanasius Kircher have been credited with inventing megaphones around the same time in the 17th century. Morland, in a work published in 1672, wrote about his experimentation with different horns. His largest megaphone consisted of over 6 m (20 ft) of copper tube and could reportedly project a person's voice a mile and a half.

More than twenty years earlier, Kircher had described a device that could be used as both a megaphone and for "overhearing" people speaking outside a house. His coiled horn would be mounted into the side of a building, with a narrow end inside that could be either spoken into or listened to, and the wide mouth projecting through the outside wall.

Morland favored a straight, tube-shaped speaking device. Kircher's horn, on the other hand, utilized a "cochleate" design, where the horn was twisted and coiled to make it more compact.

A later, papier-mâché trumpet of special design was the Sengerphone.

Additionally, in ruins of Tiwanaku are stones around the central place with holes shaped in a megaphone's profile. Their purpose is today unknown, but as local guards can show, it is possible to amplify a human voice loud enough to hear it across a large area.

The term 'megaphone' was first associated with Thomas Edison's instrument 200 years later. In 1878, Edison developed a device similar to the speaking trumpet in hopes of benefiting the deaf and hard of hearing. His variation included three separate funnels lined up in a row. The two outer funnels, which were 2,030 mm long, were made of paper and connected to a tube inserted in each ear. The middle funnel was similar to Morland's speaking trumpet, but had a larger slot to insert a user's mouth.

With Edison's megaphone, a low whisper could be heard a 300 m away, while a normal tone of voice could be heard roughly 3 km away. On the listening end, the receiver could hear a low whisper at 300 m. However the apparatus was much too large to be portable, limiting its use. George Prescott wrote: "The principal drawback at present is the large size of the apparatus."

Prior to the invention of the electric microphone, some early pop singers, such as Rudy Vallée, sang with a megaphone as their quieter voices, the hallmark of a "crooner", were often not loud enough for live performances.

Since the 1960s, acoustic megaphones have generally been replaced by electric versions (below), although the cheap, light, rugged acoustic megaphone is still used in a few venues, like cheering at sporting events and cheerleading, and by lifeguards at pools and beaches where the moisture could damage the electronics of electric megaphones.

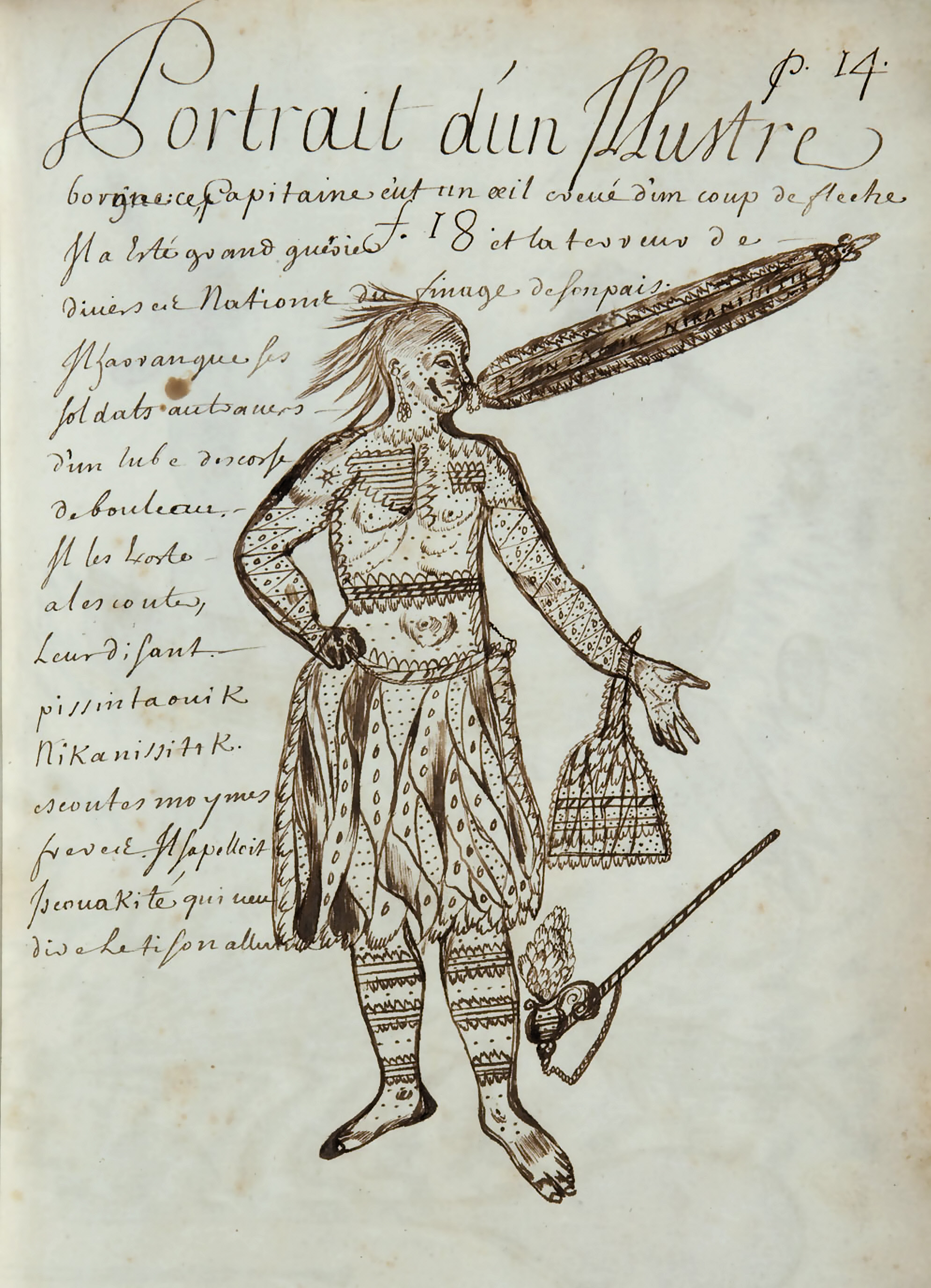
Page from the Codex canadensis, by Louis Nicolas, circa 1675 to 1682, showing an Amerindian chief using a megaphone made of bark

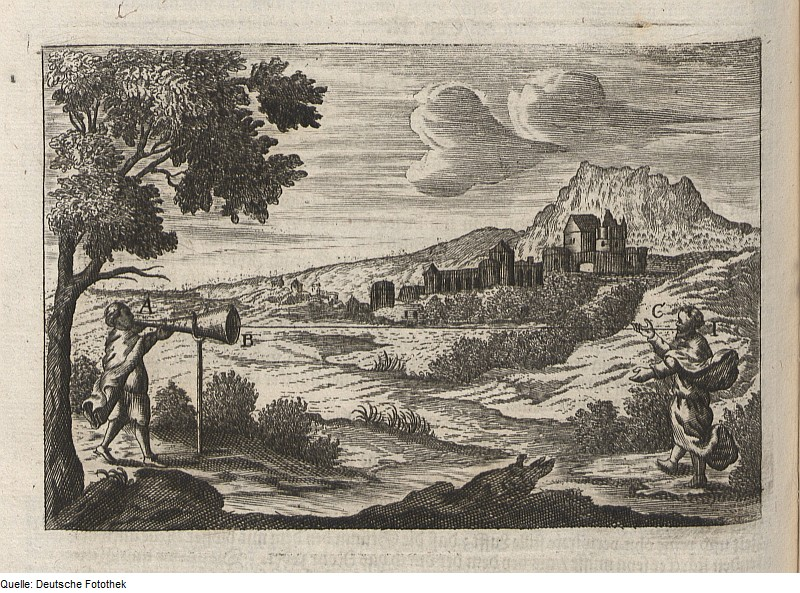
Drawing by Athanasius Kircher, 1684, shows man (left) using megaphone to communicate over distance

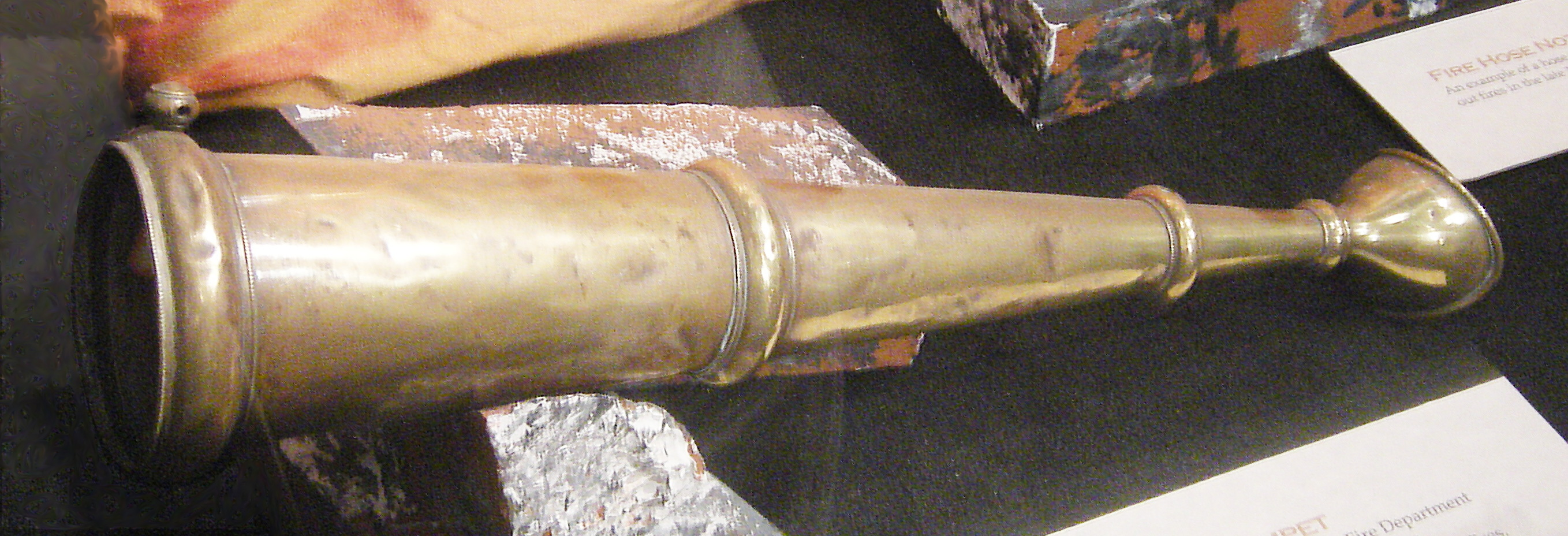
A late 19th-century speaking trumpet used by firefighters

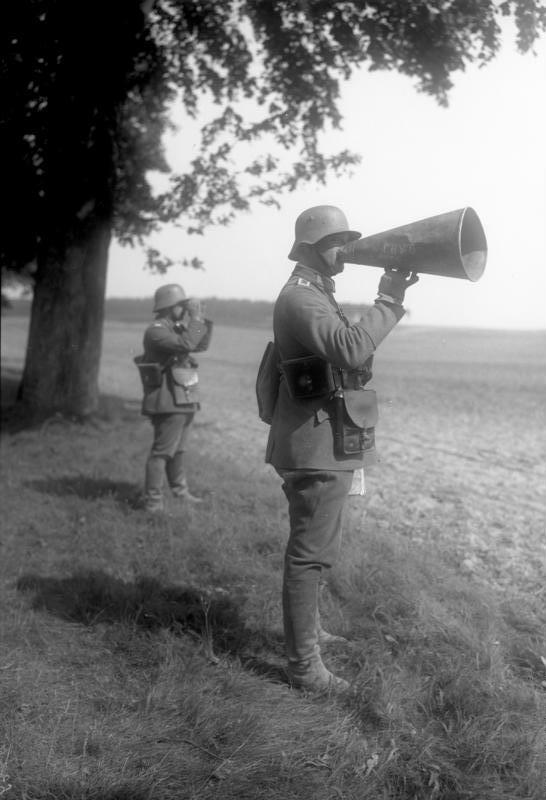
German soldier using a megaphone to command troops, 1930

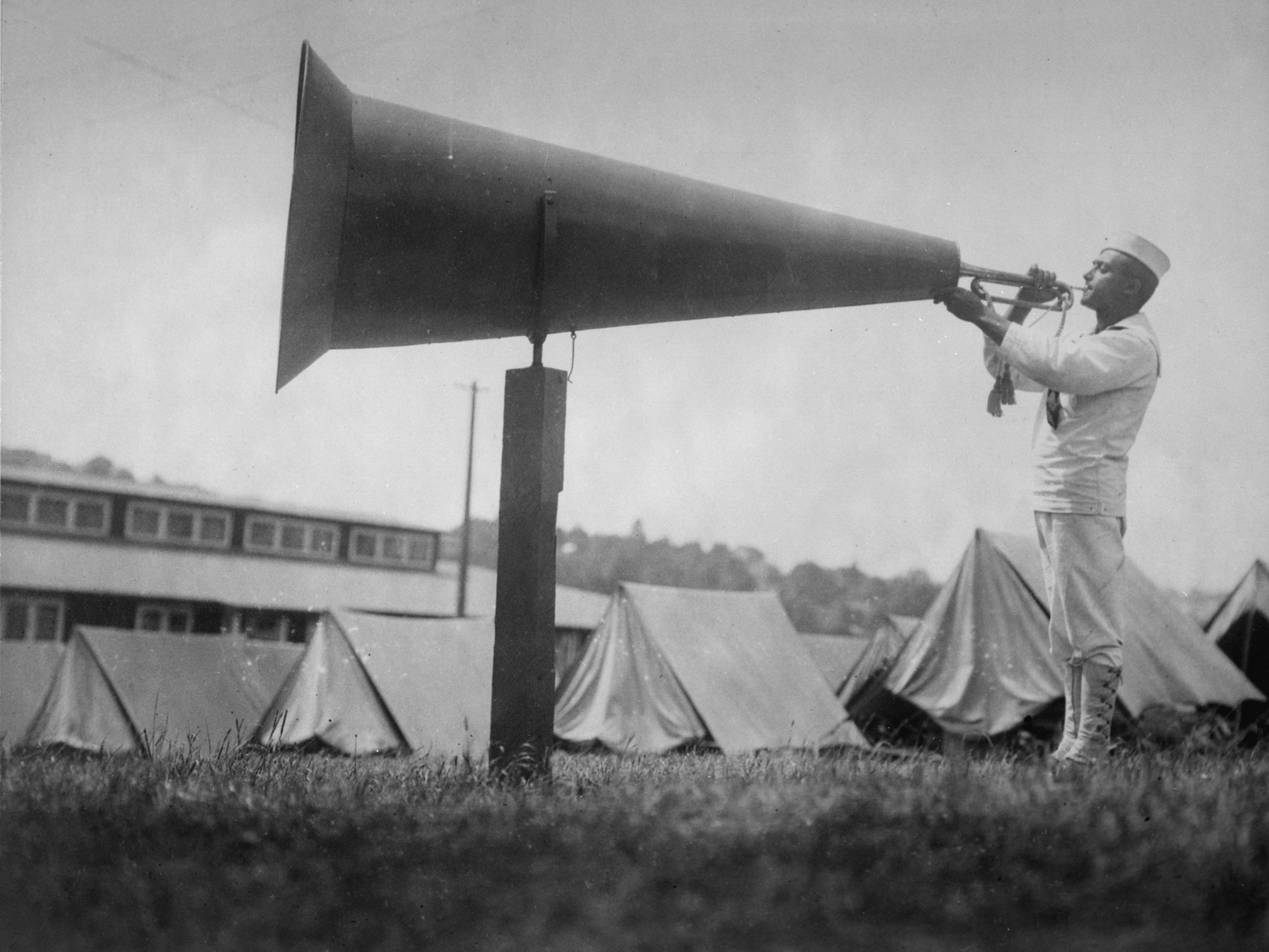
A sailor using a megaphone to amplify the sound of a bugle to wake recruits at an American training camp in 1947

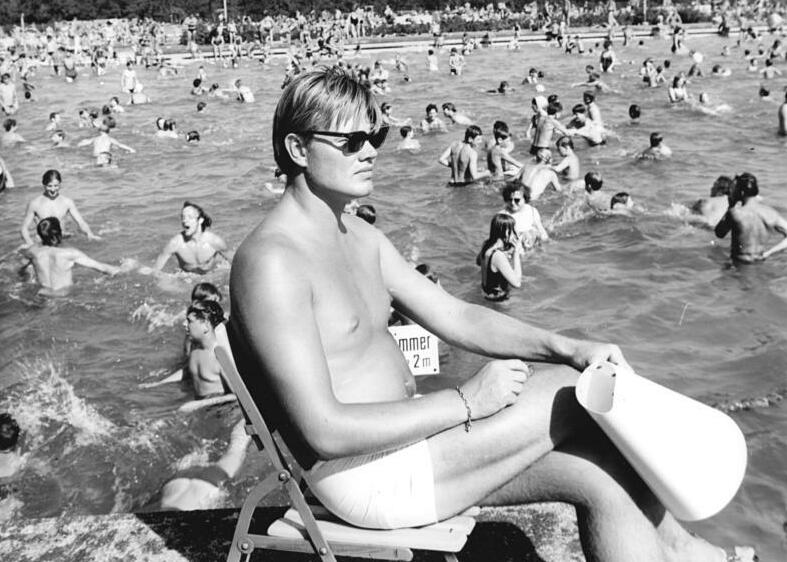
East German lifeguard with megaphone, 1969

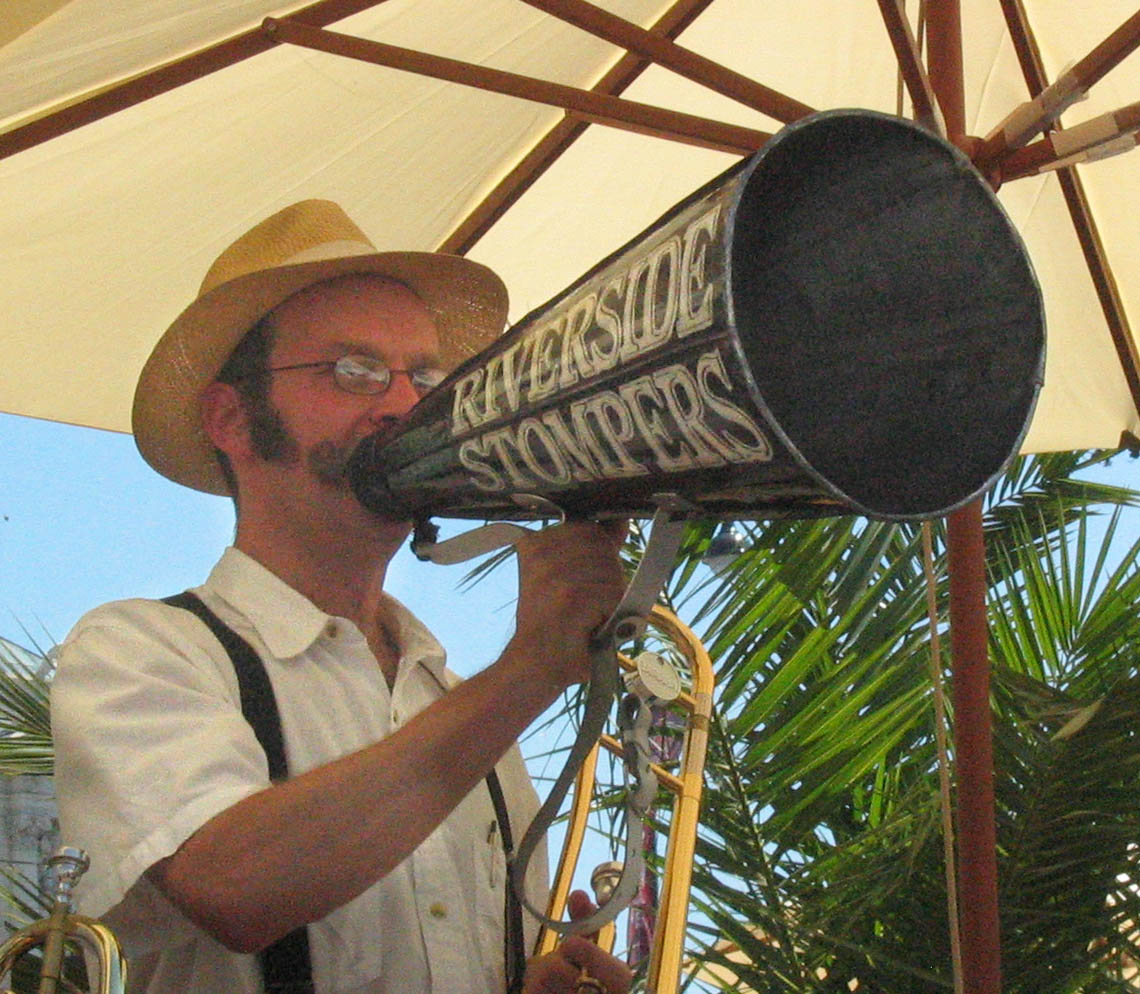
Austrian jazz singer using megaphone, 2007

== Electric megaphone ==
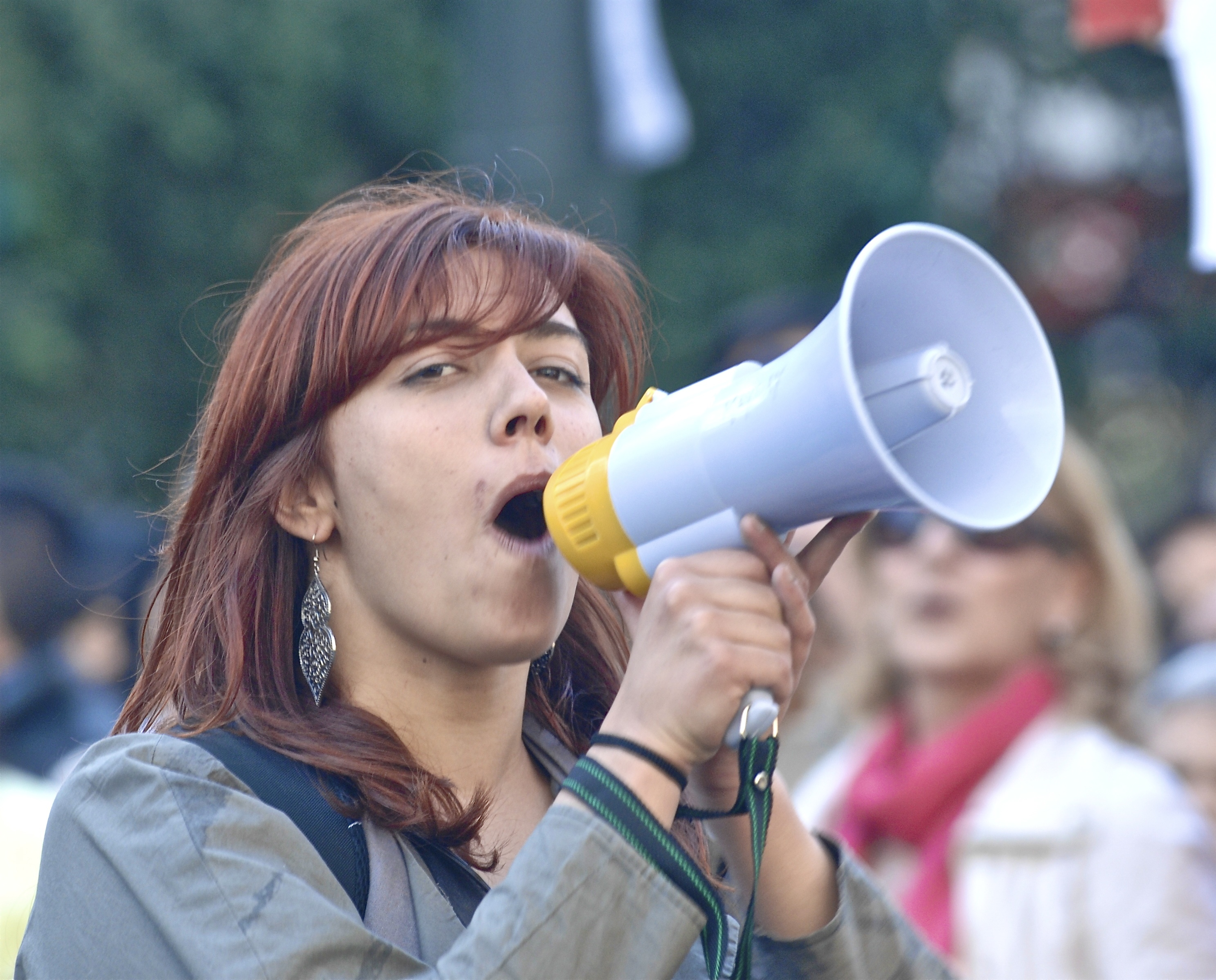
(left) Woman using a small handheld electric megaphone at a demonstration in Portugal. (right) Electric megaphones use a type of horn loudspeaker called a reflex or reentrant horn. The sound waves travel in a zigzag path through concentric widening ducts (b, c, and d).

An electric megaphone is a handheld public address system, an electronic device that amplifies the human voice like an acoustic megaphone, using electric power. It consists of a microphone to convert soundwaves into an electrical audio signal, an amplifier powered by a battery to increase the power of the audio signal, and a loudspeaker to convert the audio signal to sound waves again. Although slightly heavier than acoustic megaphones, electric megaphones can amplify the voice to a higher level, to over 90 dB. They have replaced acoustic megaphones in most applications, and are generally used to address congregations of people wherever stationary public address systems are not available; at outdoor sporting events, movie sets, political rallies, and street demonstrations.

Although electronic public address systems have existed since vacuum tube amplifiers were developed in the early 1920s, vacuum tube versions were too heavy to be portable. Practical portable electric megaphones had to await the development of solid-state electronics which followed the invention of the transistor in 1947. In 1954, TOA Corporation developed the EM-202, the world's first transistorized megaphone.

Handheld versions are shaped generally like the old acoustic megaphone, with a microphone at one end and a horn speaker at the other, and a pistol grip on the side, with a trigger switch to turn it on. In use, the device is held up to the mouth, and the trigger is pressed to turn it on while speaking. Other larger versions hang from the shoulder on a strap, and have a separate handheld microphone on a cord to speak into, so users can address a crowd without the instrument obscuring their faces. A vast array of modern electric megaphones are available to purchase, and characteristics like power, weight, price, and the presence of alarms and shoulder straps all contribute to a consumer's choice.

The shape of the megaphone directly affects the range of projection; narrower horns compensate for lower power by concentrating sound more sharply than wide horns.

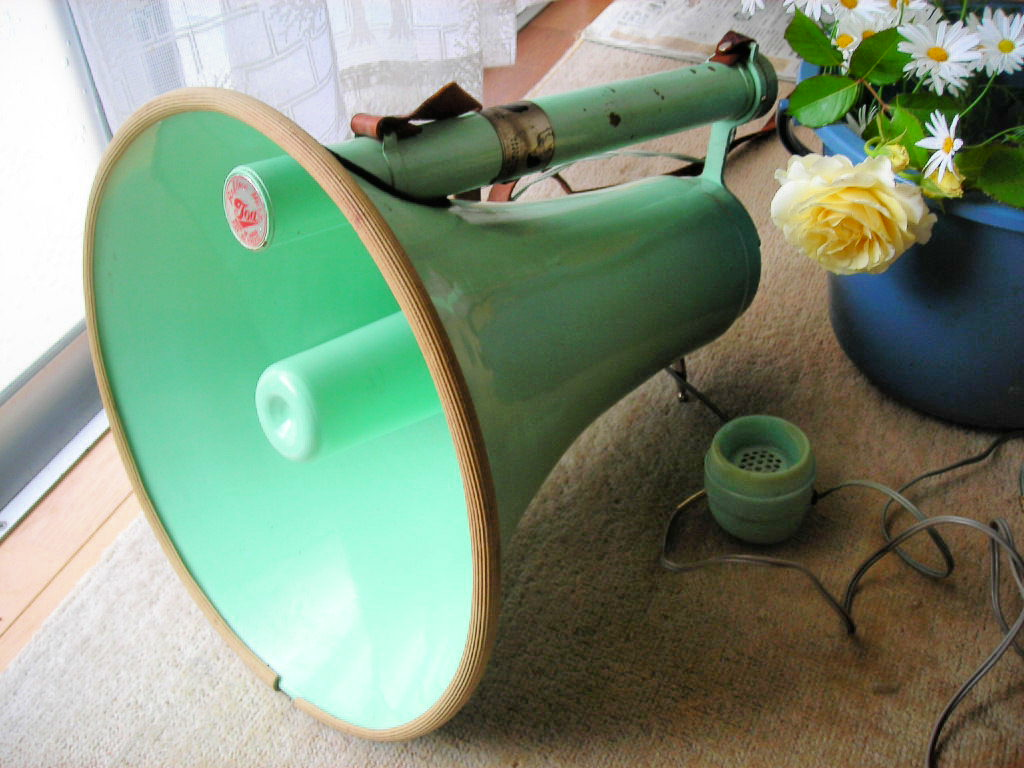
The EM-202 made by TOA Corp., the first transistorized handheld megaphone

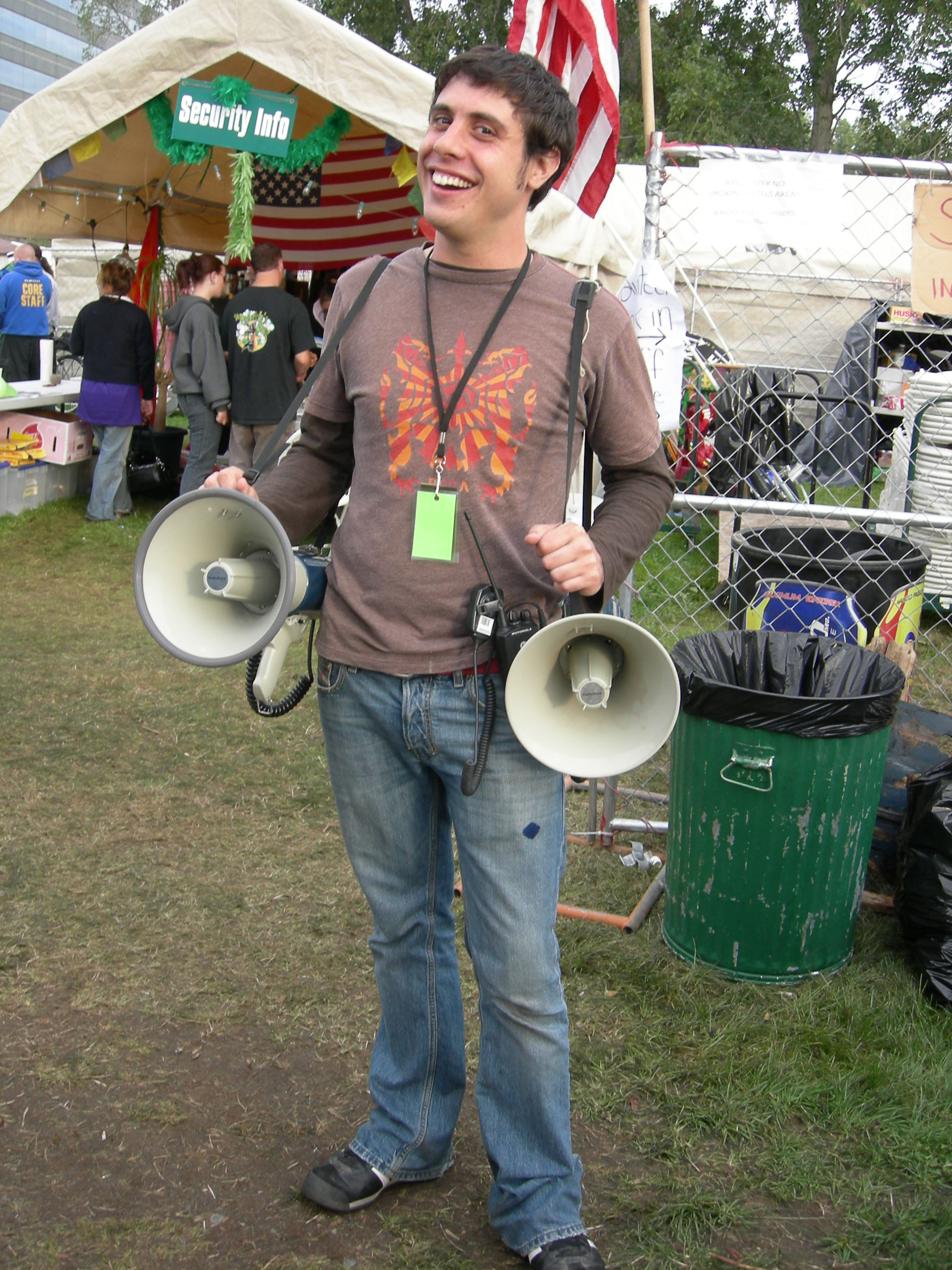
Waist-slung megaphones with separate microphones

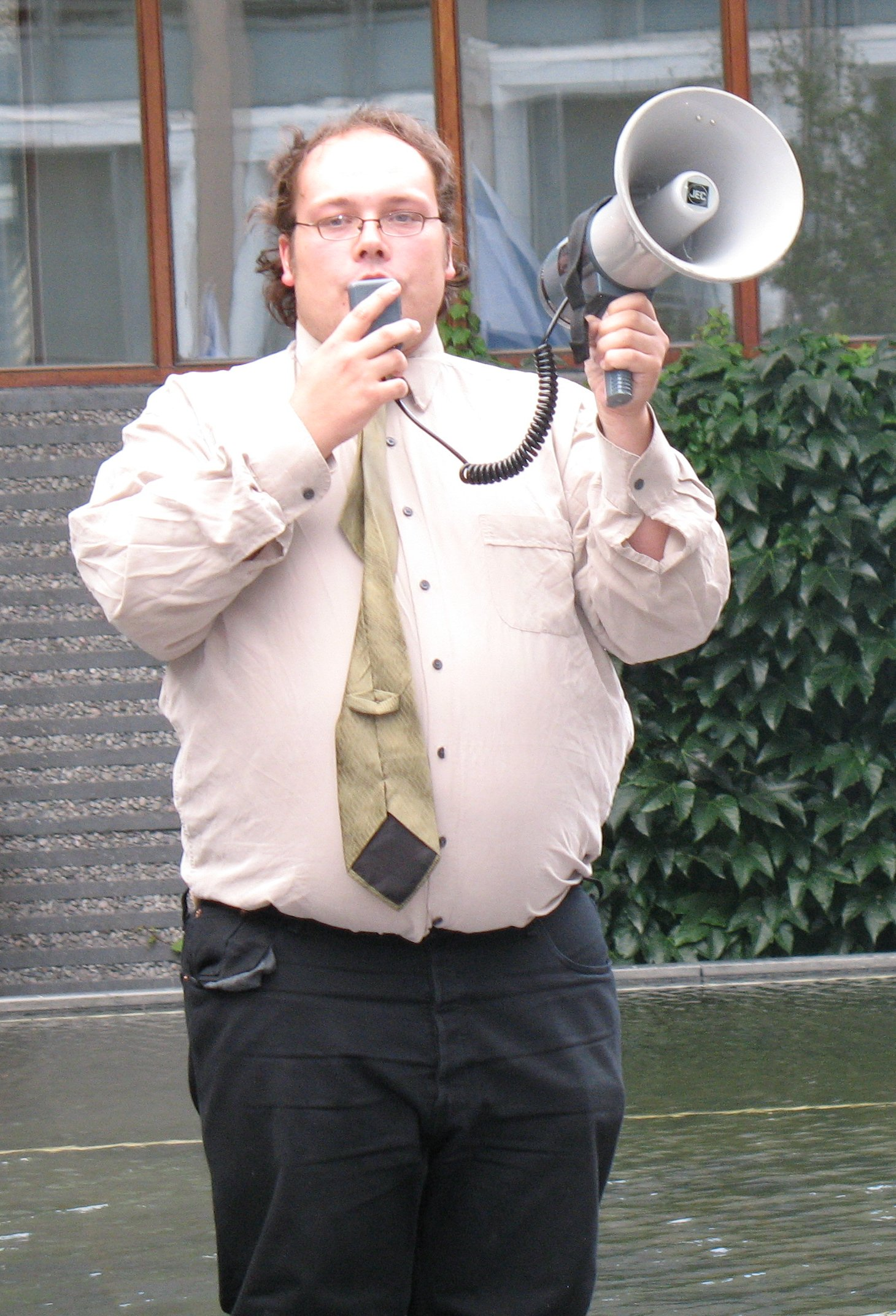
Man using megaphone with separate microphone

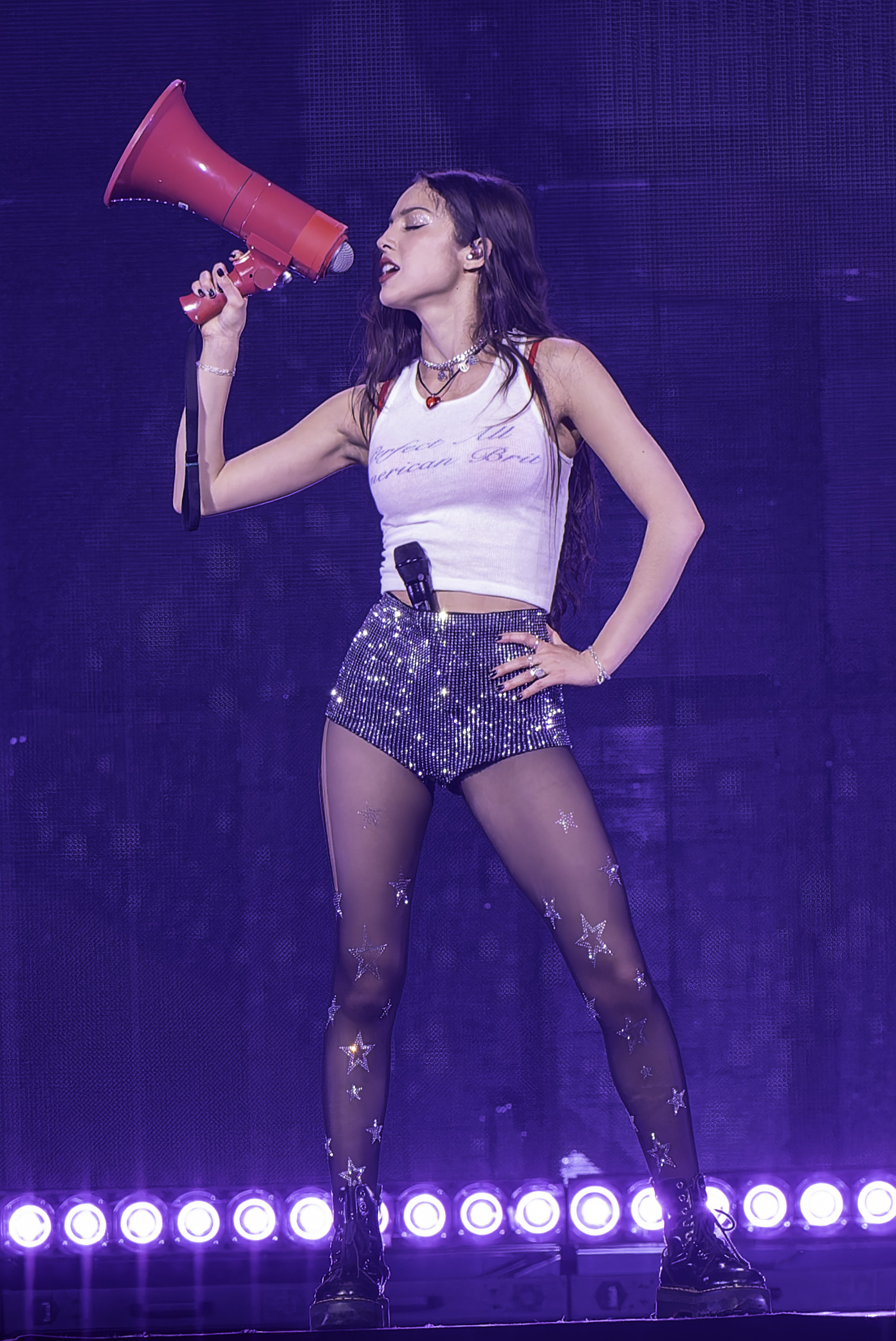
The singer Olivia Rodrigo using a megaphone

== Impact on society ==
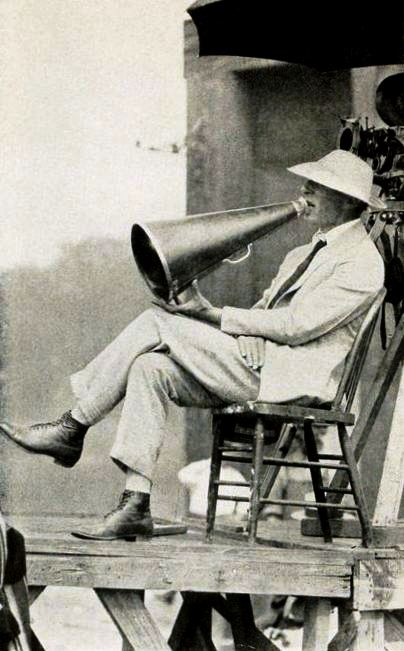
Silent film director D. W. Griffith using megaphone in 1922

Portable megaphones are widely used for crowd management and mass communication. When needing to communicate information or directions to a large crowd of people in one place, an electric megaphone is valuable when other public address systems are not present.

Besides their practical implications, public address systems, including megaphones, also had a social impact. Public address systems helped promote women's participation in society. In events like the National Republican and Democratic Conventions of 1920, when electronic public address systems were first becoming popularized, women used these amplifying technologies during the roll call of participants. Later, portable electric megaphones extended this equalizing influence to outdoor events. Some protest leaders use electric megaphones to speak to an outdoor crowd or to other protesters.

As of the 2010s, cheerleading is one of the few fields that still uses acoustic megaphones. Cheerleaders at the University of Minnesota are credited with first using acoustic megaphones in routines in 1898. Since then, cheerleaders have relied heavily on acoustic megaphones during performances at sporting events. Generally, female cheerleaders would use pom poms while male cheerleaders, with loud booming voices, would project cheers through megaphones. Vocal projection is an important aspect for cheerleading, so experts recommend the use of acoustic megaphones not only to increase the volume of sound, but also to protect performers’ voices in the process.

For decades, film directors have used megaphones to communicate with their cast and crew on sets where it was hard to hear. The acoustic megaphone became an iconic clichéd symbol of a movie director, although modern directors use electric megaphones. A major contributor to this cliche was Cecil B. DeMille, director of epic movies like The Ten Commandments and The King of Kings. Many of his films were biblical epics set on vast outdoor sets that required communication with hundreds of extras.

The distinctive distorted sound of a human voice amplified by a megaphone is widely recognized, from its use in train and bus stations and sports arenas. Applied to music, it gives the sound of an antique acoustic gramophone record player. It has been used in radio advertisements and popular music to give retro and often humorous effects. A recorded voice or music can be processed to give it a "megaphone" sound effect without using an actual megaphone, by audio recording decks and software. In recording software like Logic Pro and Pro Tools, selecting certain filters and settings will produce an artificial sound almost indistinguishable from an electric megaphone.

== Legal restrictions ==
Governments can pass laws restricting the use of electronically amplified megaphones. In the US the ability to use a megaphone in public can be restricted to certain decibel levels, time of day or banned in residential neighborhoods. However, under the First Amendment, the specific kinds of speech used with a megaphone cannot be restricted.

== See also ==
- Human microphone
- Long range acoustic device (LRAD)
- Water Talkie
