= Codex canadensis =

Canadian wildlife and native peoples document (c. 1700)

- Gilcrease Museum
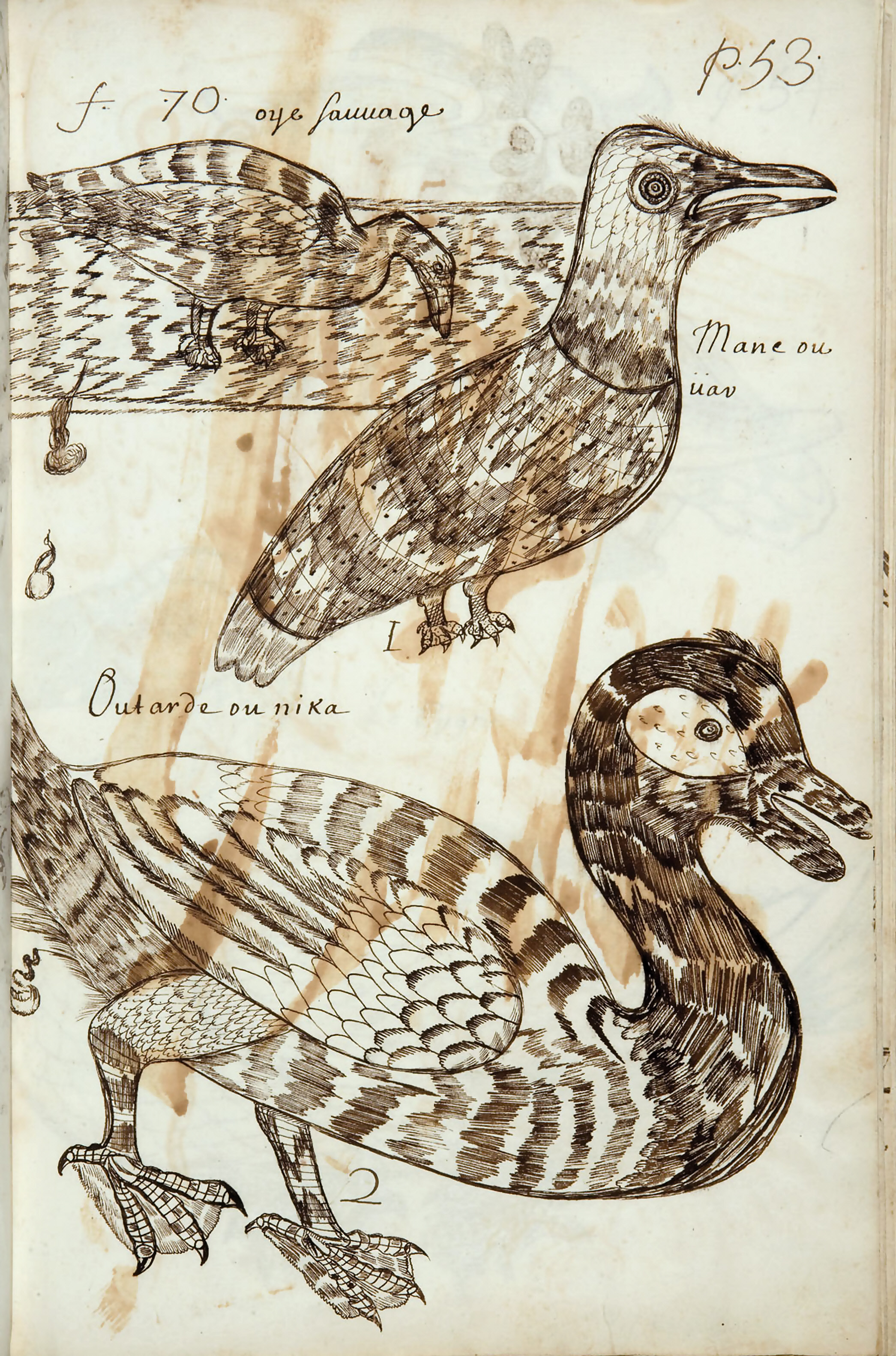
- Codex canadensis, p. 53.
- Date: c. 1700
- Language: French
- Author: Louis Nicolas
- Size: 79 pages
- Previously kept: Librairie Georges Andrieux
- Discovered: 1934
- Other: This work is thought to be a book of illustrations to accompany another manuscript, the Histoire Naturelle des Indes Occidentales

Codex canadensis is a handwritten and hand-drawn document from c. 1700 that depicts the wildlife and native peoples of Canada. It contains 180 drawings of First Nations' people, plants, mammals, birds and fish of the New World. Although the manuscript was neither signed nor dated, scholars believe its most likely author was Louis Nicolas, a French Jesuit. It is currently kept at the Gilcrease Museum, in Tulsa, Oklahoma.

== Author ==
When a facsimile of the Codex was produced in 1934, a foreword by Baron Marc de Villiers attributed the original work to Bécart de Granville. Scholars have more recently discovered that the author was probably Nicolas. The Histoire Naturelle des Indes Occidentales, a document held at the Bibliothèque nationale de France in Paris, is speculated to have also been written by Nicolas and provides an in depth description of the animals, fish and plants of Canada, which are all depicted in the Codex Canadensis.

The author of the Histoire Naturelle also mentions that the descriptions of his observations are accompanied by illustrations: French: toute sorte de bons poissons, qu'on ne voit pas dans nôtre Europe, dont je vous donneray a la fin de mon Histoire naturelle, les noms, les figures, et les portraits. The author of the latter document signed his work M.L.N.P, which recalls the initials of the Grammaire Algonquine 's author, Louis Nicolas. Furthermore, in the Grammaire 's preface, the author specifies that he has placed at the end of his book an extra section on the history of the country: "On a mis à la fin de cette grammaire un petit supplément de l'histoire du pays". The Codex Canadensis and Histoire Naturelle des Indes Occidentales could easily be the supplement Louis Nicolas refers too. Indeed, the similarities between the Codex Canadensis, the Histoire Naturelle and the Grammaire Algonquine make it reasonable to believe that all three documents were written by the same man, Louis Nicolas, Priest and Missionary.

=== Louis Nicolas ===
Louis Nicolas was born in 1634 in Ardèche, France. He joined the Jesuits at age 20. In 1664, he arrived in New France, where his order was sent to convert the Aboriginal peoples. As he travelled, his interest in Aboriginal languages and culture increased. Nonetheless, he did not always behave accordingly towards the native peoples. He could be "quick-tempered and rather vain". In 1675, he returned to France.

== Cartography ==
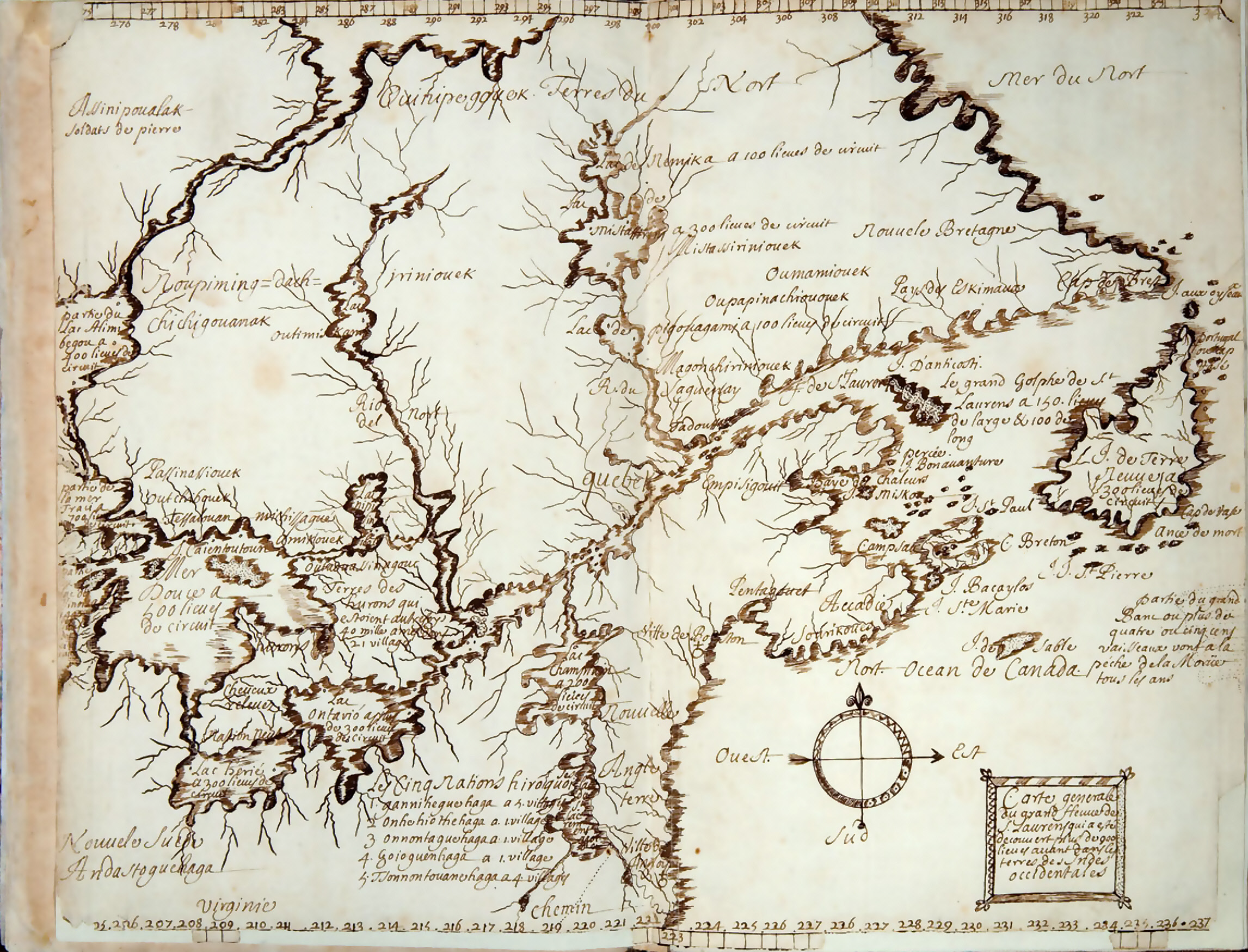
Codex canadensis: inside back cover. (Gilcrease Museum)

Apart from its depictions of plants, animals, and native peoples, the Codex Canadensis also includes two maps. The inside front cover of the tome contains a map of the Mississippi River and its environs, while the inside back cover contains a map of northeastern North America, including territories such as New France and Acadia, as well as New England, New York, Newfoundland and the region of the Great Lakes. Hence, both of the maps depict French colonial spaces in North America.

Both maps contain quite a large amount of detail when it comes to labeling settlements, particularly in coastal areas and along rivers. This is consistent with European cartography of the Americas in the early modern period. The detailed depictions of coastal and fluvial settlements was important due to the importance ships had in the transportation systems of the time, particularly in the New World. Furthermore, the mapping of settlements as can be seen in the Codex Canadensis, and cartography in general, played an important role in the imperial endeavours of European powers in this period. In that sense, the maps in the Codex can be seen as part of the wider context of cartography as a colonial tool, a way of asserting control over certain spaces.

== First Nations peoples ==
The presentation of Native (Indian) communities in the Codex Canadensis is a veritable compendium of different aspects of indigenous life. The sketches represent many different communities, from Algonquin to Iroquois to Outawaks and so on, and document the varying lifestyle between the communities. One page details the different types of canoe dependent on community, and there is another page similarly devoted to different types of cabins. The inclusion of mythology through the various representations of Natives and their interaction with the sun or moon additionally adds to the full picture that composed Native life. This ethnographic pictorial study of these communities provides a more literal depiction of these communities as other similar studies of the time, such as that of DuCreux, were less observant of the ornamentation of bodies such as tattoos, which Louis Nicolas takes much care to draw in detail.

The captions describe the native peoples as sauvages or barbares, implying the subordination of these communities to the arrival of Europeans in the New World. This is subordination, not racial degeneration, as contemporary French ideas of the time were formed about the unity of all humankind; therefore the Native societies were believed to be less civilised than their French contemporaries, seen with their use of language. The equation of Natives with the New World's flora and fauna in the Codex Canadensis further shows this subordination.

== Plants ==
The Codex Canadensis features four plates with drawings of 18 different plant species, most of which are native to Canada. Art historian Francois-Marc Gagnon concluded that the images were likely not copied from books, but that it is impossible to determine whether or not the drawings were produced in Canada. Possible connections between the drawings of the Codex and gardens in France have been established, as gardens were a choice place to observe plants at the time. Canadian plants ended up in these gardens in France, the white cedar grown in the Jardin des Tuileries, a drawing of which can be found in the Codex. These connections make it possible that Nicolas produced his drawings both during his expeditions in Canada as well as in France, inspired by plants cultivated in French gardens. However, Nicolas' method was common for that time period and does not lessen the value of the images.

Though Louis Nicolas underwent the rigorous education associated with the Jesuit religious order, he never had any formal training in botanical illustration. Some of the plants are poorly represented, and have proven to be difficult to identify, the illustrations generally lacking consistency in their representations of plant anatomy. In a pre-Linnaean scientific world, Nicolas used Aristotelian explanatory framework to relate his accumulating observations about plants to the authority of religion-tinged ancient knowledge. Additionally, there does not appear to be any explicit criteria for the classification of the plants in the Codex, but it can be deduced that the author ordered them by size, starting from smaller herbs, to fruits and then trees.

The Codex features some plants that are not indigenous to Canada, for example the passion flower, named the granadille by Nicolas. The caption for this particular illustration in the document reads 'qui produit les instruments de la passion'. Nicolas' representation of the passion flower shows the religious interpretation of the flower's anatomy, with parts of the flower representing various aspects of the passion of Christ. This flower is indigenous to South America, and is likely in the Codex as a curiosity, as it was popular among 16th- and 17th-century illustrators. The explicitly religious symbols incorporated into the drawing of the passion flower is another example of the various fictional creatures and marvels present in the Codex.

== Animals ==
An additional constituent to the Codex is devoted to the wildlife of the French colony. Louis Nicolas subdivides the volume into three distinct segments with regard to the living animals, their visual description and illustrations.

He begins his description of New France's wildlife with the many birds he encountered along his journey through the newly colonized land. These illustrations include that of game birds, owls, and pigeons to name a few, with short and concise visual descriptions alongside the hand drawings. He continues his accounts of the diverse North American wildlife with a wide array of fish. In fact, he dedicates fourteen pages of the Codex to these aquatic creatures, from goldfish, to trout, and from halibut to cod. Keeping in mind that cod was incredibly lucrative at this time for the French empire, playing a major role within the French economy, it comes as no surprise that Louis Nicolas illustrated the fish with great enthusiasm.

He also gives a visual description of the numerous living quadrupeds roaming around the land. He mentions many of the animals regularly encountered today such as squirrels, mice, rabbits and deer. Louis Nicolas further orients himself towards the realm of the fanciful. In terms of visual representations, he provides his public with creatures like the monstre marin (sea monster) and licorne de la Mer Rouge (unicorn of the Red Sea). Sketches of these beasts are also bestowed. Convinced that these magical beasts did in fact exist, he relied on ancient Greek literature to cement his claims. Other wildlife is also incorporated into this large volume, such as reptiles and small insects, though they do not take precedence in comparison to the first three types of species previously mentioned.

== Notes ==
=== References ===
- Bolster, Jeffrey, W. (2014). The Mortal Sea: Fishing the Atlantic in the Age of Sail. Harvard University Press.
- Codignola, Luca (2004) [First published 2004]. "Jesuits.". In Hallowell, Gerald (ed.). The Oxford Companion to Canadian History. Oxford University Press. ISBN 978-0-1917-3515-8.
- Delbourgo, James; Dew, Nicholas (2008). Science and Empire in the Atlantic World. New York: Routledge.
- Gagnon, François-Marc; Jarislowsky, Gail; Jarislowsky, Stephen A. (August 1, 2006a). "Codex Canadensis: About the Manuscript". Library and Archives Canada. Archived from the original on September 24, 2015.
- Gagnon, François-Marc; Jarislowsky, Gail; Jarislowsky, Stephen A. (August 1, 2006b). "Codex Canadensis: About Louis Nicolas". Library and Archives Canada. Archived from the original on September 24, 2015.
- M.L.N.P. Histoire Naturelle des Indes Occidentales. Bibliothèque Nationale de Paris.
- Nicolas, Louis (1672–1674). Grammaire Algonquine ou des Sauvages de l'Amérique Septentrionale. Vol. folio 1. Bibliothèque Nationale de Paris.
- Nicolas, Louis; Gagnon, François-Marc; Ouellet, Réal; Senior, Nancy (2011). The Codex Canadensis and The Writings of Louis Nicolas: The Natural History of The New World. Montreal & Kingston: McGill-Queen's University Press.
- Sayre, Meridith Beck (2013). "Gagnon, François-Marc, Nancy Senior and Réal Ouellet - The Codex Canadensis and the Writings of Louis Nicolas" (PDF). 46 (91). Histoire Sociale / Social History: 235–236.
- Sioui, Anne-Marie (1979). "Qui est l'auteur du Codex Canadiensis?". Recherches Amérindiennes au Québec. VIII (4): 271–279.
- Warkentin, Germaine (2010). "Aristotle in New France: Louis Nicolas and The Making of The Codex Canadensis". French Colonial History. 11: 71–107. doi:10.1353/fch.0.0026. S2CID 143650626.
