= Water Talkies =

Device for amplifying voices underwater

A Water Talkie is a colorful, cone-shaped device that amplifies voices underwater over a range of up to 15 feet (4.5 meters). Water Talkies make talking underwater possible. They were invented by Richie Stachowski Jr. in 1995 at age 11.

Over time a single product turned into a company producing water toys "made by a kid for kids": a line of eight pool toys.

In 1999 Stachowski was the youngest individual to win the Entrepreneur of the Year Award for this invention.

== See also ==
- Megaphone
