= Paul Bécart de Granville et de Fonville =

Paul Bécart de Granville et de Fonville (January 18, 1695 – March 19, 1754) was an officer in the French colonial regular troops and a seigneur.

Bécart de Grenville et de Fonville was the brother of Charles Bécart de Granville et de Fonville, a king's attorney. He entered military service in 1712 and had achieved the rank of captain by April, 1737. In 1733, he had received the seigneury of Île aux Grues.

In 1743, Paul Bécart became the commandant of Fort Saint Frédéric on Lake Champlain. He replaced François-Antoine Pécaudy de Contrecœur. In 1750, he was made a knight of the order of Saint-Louis particularly because of his service at Fort Saint Frédéric.
