= Charles Bécart de Granville et de Fonville =

Charles Bécart de Granville et de Fonville (bapt. May 31, 1675 – January 2, 1703) was a king's attorney, draughtsman, and cartographer at Quebec City.

Charles, who was often called Sieur de Granville and was the brother of Paul Bécart de Granville et de Fonville, was considered by some to be a genius. He had begun a naval career when the death of the incumbent king's attorney in the provost court of Quebec caused a vacancy. Although he had not reached the age of majority, Louis-Hector de Callière, the governor general of New France and Jean Bochart de Champigny, the intendant of New France obtained a commission for him from the king and he became king's attorney in 1700. He died in a smallpox epidemic.

Bécart was important to the history of New France because of his maps and for his Vue de Québec which identified him as a potentially remarkable artist.
