= Antoine Pécaudy de Contrecœur =

Antoine Pécaudy de Contrecœur (French pronunciation: [ɑ̃twan pekodi də kɔ̃tʁəkœʁ]; 1596 – May 1, 1688) was an officer in the Carignan-Salières Regiment and the first seigneur of Contrecœur. His son, François-Antoine Pécaudy de Contrecœur, inherited the seigneury from his father.

Antoine Pécaudy came to New France in 1665 and was still an active military man attaining the rank of captain. He led numerous campaigns and was wounded several times. He stayed in Canada at the time the regiment disbanded. A number of the officers who stayed were granted generous lands. His seigneury gave its name to present-day Contrecoeur, Quebec.
