= Louis Nicolas =

French missionary

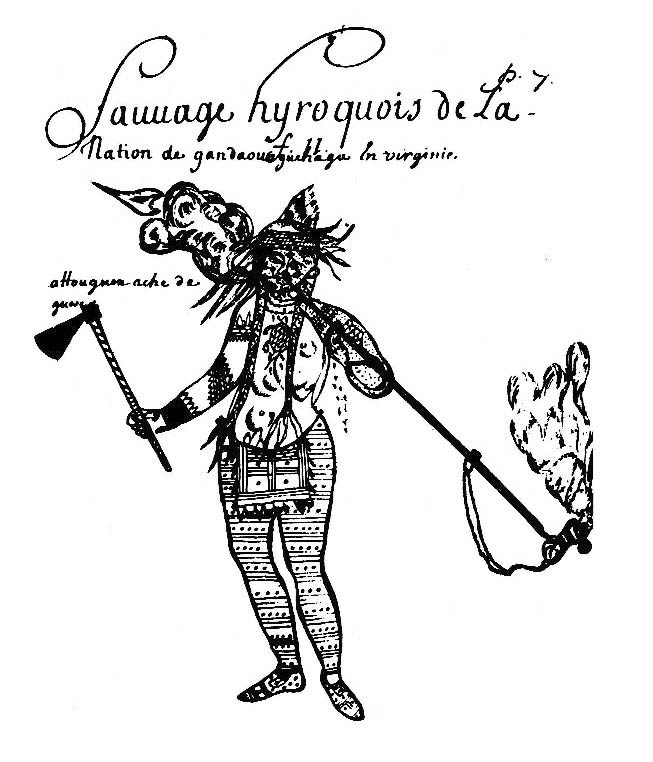
Susquehannock by Louis Nicolas a Jesuit in New France from 1664 to 1675. From the Codex canadiensis. Thomas Gilcrease Institute of American History and Art, Tulsa

Louis Nicolas (August 15, 1634 – 1682?) was a French missionary in Canada in the late 17th and early 18th century. At the age of about 30, this Jesuit priest arrived in New France in 1664 and stayed for eleven years. He was fascinated by the wildlife and Native peoples of the New World, and is believed to have been the author of the hand-drawn book known as the Codex canadensis, which documents these subjects. Nicolas is the confirmed author of the books Histoire Naturelle des Indes Occidentales and the Grammaire algonquine. He returned to France in 1675, and historians believe that he died in 1682.

Nicolas was born in Aubenas, Vivarais, a commune now in the Ardèche department. At the age of twenty, he joined the Jesuits, a male congregation of the Catholic Church. In 1664, his order was sent to Canada to convert the Aboriginal peoples. As he travelled from the western end of Lake Superior to Sept-Îles, and from Trois-Rivières to the south of Lake Ontario, Nicolas’ interest in Aboriginal languages and culture increased. Nonetheless, according to the Jesuit Relations, Nicolas did not always behave accordingly towards the native peoples. In fact, in a memoir by Antoine Alet, secretary to Sulpician superior M. de Queylus, the Jesuit was "described as a quick-tempered and rather vain man." Moreover, his congregation was not pleased with him as he attempted to tame two bear cubs at the Jesuits' residence in Sillery, in the hope of impressing the king. In his own writings, Nicolas appears to have been more interested in exploring and observing nature than in the conversion goals of the Jesuits.

In 1675, Louis Nicolas left Canada and returned to France. Nothing more was heard of him after his departure.
