= François-Antoine Pécaudy de Contrecœur =

François-Antoine Pécaudy de Contrecœur (French pronunciation: [fʁɑ̃swa ɑ̃twan pekodi də kɔ̃tʁəkœʁ]; c. 1676 – July 2, 1743) was a military man by career (Carignan-Salières Regiment) and had inherited the seigneury of Contrecœur from his father, Antoine Pécaudy de Contrecœur. His son, Claude-Pierre Pécaudy de Contrecœur was an officer in French colonial forces and a key figure in the French and Indian War.

François-Antoine Pécaudy was part of many important military campaigns. They included Governor Frontenac's against the Onondagas and Oneidas in 1696.

Pécaudy de Contrecœur became a knight of the order of Saint-Louis in 1738. He mapped of Lake Champlain and, in October 1741, he was placed in command of Fort Saint Frédéric south of the lake. In the spring of 1743, he was replaced by Bécart de Granville.
