= Saint-Louis River (Yamaska River tributary) =

Location
- Country: Canada
- Province: Quebec
- Region: Montérégie
- MRC: Pierre-De Saurel Regional County Municipality

Physical characteristics
- Source: Various agricultural streams
  - location: Saint-Aimé
  - coordinates: 45.844562°N 72.99655°W
  - elevation: 29
- Mouth: Le Petit Chenail
  - location: Yamaska
  - coordinates: 46.02611°N 72.92083°W
  - elevation: 18 m (59 ft)
- Length: 22.0 km (13.7 mi)

The Saint-Louis river is a tributary of the Yamaska River, through the Petit Chenail. This river flows northeast in the municipalities of Saint-Aimé and Yamaska in the Pierre-De Saurel Regional County Municipality, in the administrative region of Montérégie, on the South Shore of the St. Lawrence River, in the province of Quebec, Canada.

== Geography ==
The main hydrographic slopes neighboring the Saint-Louis river are:

- north side: rivière Pot au Beurre, Yamaska River, Lake Saint-Pierre;
- east side: Yamaska River, Le Petit Chenail;
- south side: Salvail River;
- west side: Lemoine River, rivière Pot au Beurre, Bellevue River, Petite Bellevue River, Richelieu River.

The Saint-Louis river rises in Rang Prescott just north of the "cordon discharge", southwest of the village of Saint-Louis-de-Bonsecours and north of the village of Saint-Louis.

From its head, the Saint-Louis river flows on:

- 7.7 kilometres (4.8 mi) north in an agricultural zone to route 239, or 4.1 km west of the intersection of route 235 along Yamaska River;
- 12.4 kilometres (7.7 mi) north in an agricultural area to route 132;
- 1.9 kilometres (1.2 mi) north in agricultural area to its mouth.

The Saint-Louis river flows on the west bank of the Le Petit chenail, 1.4 km upstream from the outlet of the channel which connects to the west bank of the Yamaska River. The mouth of the Saint-Louis river is located east of Sorel-Tracy, 3.0 km north of the Camille-Parenteau Bridge located in the village of Yamaska and 11.7 km north of the village center of Massueville.

== Toponymy ==
Formerly, this river was designated "rivière des Pins Verts" (English: Green Pine River).

The toponym "Saint-Louis" was officially registered on December 5, 1968 at the Commission de toponymie du Québec.

== Appendices ==
=== Related articles ===
- Yamaska River, a stream
- Rivière Pot au Beurre, a stream
- Yamaska, a municipality
- Saint-Aimé, a municipality
- Pierre-De Saurel Regional County Municipality
- List of rivers of Quebec
