= Petite rivière Pot au Beurre =

River in Montérégie, Quebec (Canada)

Petite rivière Pot au Beurre Old name: "Troisième rivière Pot au Beurre"

Location
- Country: Canada
- Province: Quebec
- Region: Montérégie
- MRC: Pierre-De Saurel Regional County Municipality
- Municipality: Yamaska, Sainte-Victoire-de-Sorel

Physical characteristics
- Source: Agricultural streams
  - location: Saint-Robert
  - coordinates: 45.98572°N 72.98946°W
  - elevation: 17 m (56 ft)
- Mouth: Rivière Pot au Beurre
  - location: Yamaska
  - coordinates: 46.04917°N 72.98444°W
  - elevation: 9 m (30 ft)
- Length: 8.8 km (5.5 mi)

Basin features
- Tributaries
  - left: (upward) décharge des Dix, décharge Desrosiers, décharge des Dix.
  - right: Décharge des Lots.

The Petite rivière Pot au Beurre (in English: Little River butter pot) is a tributary of the rivière Pot au Beurre. It flows north into the municipalities of Saint-Robert and Yamaska in the Pierre-De Saurel Regional County Municipality (MRC), in the administrative region of Montérégie, on the South Shore of the St. Lawrence River, in Quebec, Canada.

== Geography ==
The main neighboring hydrographic slopes of the Little Pot-au-Beurre river are:

- North side: Yamaska River, lake Saint-Pierre;
- East side: Yamaska river, Le Petit Chenail;
- South side: Landfill of the Dix de Sainte-Sophie;
- West side: Bellevue River, rivière Pot au Beurre, Richelieu River.

The "Petite rivière Pot au Beurre" has its source in an agricultural area at 1.7 kilometres (1.1 mi) (in direct line) north of the village of Saint-Robert, in Montérégie.

From its source, the course of the Petite Rivière Pot au Beurre descends 8.8 kilometres (5.5 mi) towards the north in an agricultural zone, then in a marsh zone at the end of the course, with a drop of 8 metres (26 ft), according to the following segments:

- 3.4 kilometres (2.1 mi) towards the north in an agricultural zone forming very small coils to route 132 (route Marie-Victorin), that is to 1.0 kilometre (0.62 mi) west of the hamlet Picoudi;
- 5.4 kilometres (3.4 mi) towards the north first in an agricultural zone, then in a marsh zone, up to its mouth.

The "Petite rivière Pot au Beurre" empties in a marsh area on the southeast shore of the rivière Pot au Beurre, at 4.9 kilometres (3.0 mi) upstream of the confluence of the latter with the Yamaska River.

== Toponymy ==
This toponym is linked to the "Pot au Beurre river" of which it is a tributary.

The toponym "Petite rivière Pot-au-Beurre" was officially registered on August 28, 1980, at the Commission de toponymie du Québec.

== See also ==
- List of rivers of Quebec
