= Bellevue River =

River in Montérégie, Quebec (Canada)

Bellevue River Old name=Deuxième rivière Pot au Beurre
- Location within Quebec
- Native name: Rivière Bellevue (French)

Location
- Country: Canada
- Province: Quebec
- Region: Montérégie
- RCM: Pierre-De Saurel Regional County Municipality

Physical characteristics
- Source: Agricultural stream
  - location: Saint-Robert (at the limit of Sainte-Victoire-de-Sorel)
  - coordinates: 45.95708°N 73.02964°W
  - elevation: 22 m (72 ft)
- Mouth: Rivière Pot au Beurre
  - location: Yamaska
  - coordinates: 46.03361°N 73.01278°W
  - elevation: 10 m (33 ft)
- Length: 9.9 km (6.2 mi)

Basin features
- Progression: Rivière Pot au Beurre, Yamaska River, Saint Lawrence River
- Tributaries
  - left: (upstream) décharge des Vingt Sud, ruisseau Bellevue nord.
  - right: (upstream)

The Bellevue river (in French: rivière Bellevue) is a tributary of the rivière Pot au Beurre. It flows north in the municipalities of Saint-Robert and Sainte-Victoire, in the regional county municipality (MRC) of Pierre-De Saurel, in the administrative region of Montérégie, on the South Shore of St. Lawrence River, in Quebec, Canada.

The economic vocation of this hydrographic slope is essentially agricultural.

== Geography ==
The Lemoine River has its source in an agricultural zone which is close (north side) to the source of Petite rivière Bellevue, at the limit of municipalities of Sainte-Victoire and Saint-Robert. This source is located on east side of Chemin du Rang Bellevue.

From its source, the course of the Bellevue river descends on 9.9 kilometres (6.2 mi) almost entirely in agricultural zone, with a drop of 12 metres (39 ft), according to the following segments:

- 7.4 kilometres (4.6 mi) north in Saint-Robert, crossing the route 132 (route Marie-Victorin), in the hameau "Bellevue";
- 2.5 kilometres (1.6 mi) north, to its mouth.

The mouth of the Bellevue river empties on the south shore of rivière Pot au Beurre, close to the limit between Saint-Robert and Yamaska. From there, the current flows down the latter over 7.9 kilometres (4.9 mi) to the Yamaska River.

== Toponymy ==
The toponym "rivière Bellevue" was made official on August 28, 1980, in the place name bank of the Commission de toponymie du Québec.

== See also ==
- List of rivers of Quebec
