= Amyot River =

Location
- Country: Canada
- Province: Quebec
- Region: Capitale-Nationale
- Regional County Municipality: La Jacques-Cartier
- Unorganized territory and a municipality: Lac-Jacques-Cartier

Physical characteristics
- Source: Various agricultural streams
  - location: Saint-Bernard-de-Michaudville
  - coordinates: 45.735581°N 73.087093°W
  - elevation: 31 m (102 ft)
- Mouth: Richelieu River
  - location: Saint-Charles-sur-Richelieu
  - coordinates: 45.13611°N 73.25222°W
  - elevation: 9 m (30 ft)
- Length: 11.7 km (7.3 mi)

Basin features
- Progression: Richelieu River, St. Lawrence River
- Tributaries
  - left: (Upstream) Albert-Tourigny stream, Vieux Chemin outlet, Misère stream
  - right: (Upstream) Éphrem-Chaput stream, Saint-Denis-Saint-Bernard stream

The Amyot River flows through the municipalities of Saint-Bernard-de-Michaudville, Saint-Denis-sur-Richelieu and Saint-Charles-sur-Richelieu, in the MRC La Vallée-du-Richelieu, in the administrative region of Montérégie, on the south shore of Fleuve Saint-Laurent, in the southwest of province from Quebec, to Canada.

Besides a small forest area in the upper part of the river, agriculture is the main economic activity in this small valley.

The river surface is generally frozen from mid-December to the end of March. Safe traffic on the ice is generally from late December to early March. The river's water level varies with the seasons and the precipitation.

== Geography ==
The main hydrographic slopes neighboring the "Amyot river" are:

- north side: St. Lawrence River;
- east side: Salvail River, Yamaska River;
- south side: church stream, rivière des Hurons (Richelieu River);
- west side: Richelieu River.

The Amyot River takes its head water from agricultural streams draining the area east of the municipality of Saint-Denis-sur-Richelieu, south of Saint-Bernard-de-Michaudville and west of Saint-Jude, in 5th rang. The Saint-Denis-Saint-Bernard stream is the main head stream.

The Amyot River first flows 2.7 km northwest in the forest, collecting the water from the Albert-Tourigny stream. The river then flows 4.2 km southwest in agricultural areas passing east of the village of Saint-Denis-sur-Richelieu to route 137; and 4.8 km south-west in agricultural zones almost parallel (on the east side) to the Richelieu River, up to its mouth.

The Amyot River flows on the east bank of the Richelieu River 1.1 km downstream from the village of Saint-Charles-sur-Richelieu and 2.3 km upstream from the village of Saint-Denis-sur-Richelieu.

== Toponymy ==
The toponym “Aymot river” evokes the memory of Pierre Amiot (also spelled Amyot), (Verchères, 1781 - Verchères, 1839), resulting from the marriage of Joseph Amyot and Archange Brousseau. Amyot was a member of the Surrey County from 1813 to 1830; and, after the reorganization of the county, he was a deputy for the Verchères county until 1838.

In 1813, Pierre Amyot was captain in the militia division of Verchères. In 1827 he took part in an assembly which demanded the recall of Lord Dalhousie. The governor did not appreciate this gesture, dismissed him. He also served as commissioner for the censuses of 1825 and 1831. In 1837, he participated in the battle of Saint-Charles-sur-Richelieu. His office as Small Claims Commissioner was then revoked and the government offered a reward for his arrest. Arrested and taken to Montreal, Pierre Amyot was released in July 1838.

In his “Topographic description of the province of Lower Canada” (1815), Joseph Bouchette, the surveyor general of Lower Canada, noted this watercourse: “brook called Le Miot".

The toponym "Rivière Amyot" was formalized on December 5, 1968 at the Place Names Bank of the Commission de toponymie du Québec.

== See also ==
- Richelieu River, a stream
- Saint-Charles-sur-Richelieu, a municipality
- Saint-Denis-sur-Richelieu, a municipality
- La Vallée-du-Richelieu Regional County Municipality
- List of rivers of Quebec
