= Le Petit Chenail =

River in Montérégie, Quebec (Canada)

Le Petit Chenail (The Little Chenail)

Location
- Country: Canada
- Province: Quebec
- Region: Montérégie
- MRC: Pierre-De Saurel Regional County Municipality
- Municipality: Yamaska, Sainte-Victoire

Physical characteristics
- Source: Saint-Louis River
  - location: Yamaska
  - elevation: 5 m (16 ft)
- Mouth: Yamaska River
  - location: Yamaska
  - coordinates: 46°01′34″N 72°55′14″W
  - elevation: 4 m (13 ft)
- Length: 27.7 km (17.2 mi)

Basin features
- Tributaries
  - left: (upward)
  - right: (upward) Cours d'eau Cartier, Saint-Louis River

Le Petit Chenail (English: The Little Chenail) connects the west bank of the Yamaska River and the south bank of the Rivière Pot au Beurre, thus forming the Île du Domaine (length: 6.3 kilometres (3.9 mi) in a north–south direction; maximum width: 1.6 kilometres (0.99 mi)) in the municipality of Yamaska in the Pierre-De Saurel Regional County Municipality (MRC), in the administrative region of Montérégie, on the South Shore of Saint Lawrence River, in Quebec, Canada.

== Geography ==
The main hydrographic slopes near the "Petit Chenail" are:

- North side: Yamaska River, lake Saint-Pierre;
- East side: Yamaska River;
- South side: Saint-Louis River;
- West side: rivière Pot au Beurre.

The Petit Chenail is mainly fed by the Saint-Louis River (coming from the west). Its course borders the western part of the island of the Domaine.

The northern part of the channel crosses 1.7 kilometres (1.1 mi) a marsh area to the lower part of the Rivière Pot au Beurre.

Le Petit Chenail connects to the Yamaska River at 2.4 kilometres (1.5 mi) downstream from the Camille-Parenteau Bridge crossed by route 132 and at 3.7 kilometres (2.3 mi) upstream of the southern tip of Île Saint-Jean.

== Toponymy ==
The toponym "Le Petit Chenail" was officially registered on January 21, 1975, at the Commission de toponymie du Québec.

== See also ==
- Lac Saint-Pierre, a body of water
- List of rivers of Quebec
