= Rivière Pot au Beurre =

Pot au Beurre may refer to:

- Rivière Pot au Beurre (île d'Orléans), a tributary of the Saint Lawrence River in Saint-Pierre-de-l'Île-d'Orléans, Capitale-Nationale, Quebec, Canada
- Rivière Pot au Beurre (Yamaska River tributary), in Montérégie, Quebec, Canada
  - Petite rivière Pot au Beurre, a tributary of the rivière Pot au Beurre (Yamaska River tributary), in Montérégie, Quebec
