= Lemoine River =

River in Montérégie, Quebec (Canada)

- Location within Quebec
- Native name: Rivière Lemoine (French)

Location
- Country: Canada
- Province: Quebec
- Region: Montérégie
- RCM: Les Maskoutains Regional County Municipality, Pierre-De Saurel Regional County Municipality

Physical characteristics
- Source: Agricultural stream
  - location: Saint-Louis
  - coordinates: 45.89222°N 73.04278°W
  - elevation: 27 m (89 ft)
- Mouth: Rivière Pot au Beurre
  - location: Sainte-Victoire-de-Sorel
  - coordinates: 45.93842°N 73.09636°W
  - elevation: 18 m (59 ft)
- Length: 9.0 km (5.6 mi)

Basin features
- Progression: Rivière Pot au Beurre, Yamaska River, Saint Lawrence River
- Tributaries
  - right: (upstream) Décharge des Vingt Sud, Petite rivière Bellevue, ruisseau Saint-Robert, décharge des Huit.

The Lemoine river (in French: rivière Lemoine) is a tributary of the rivière Pot au Beurre. It generally flows north-west in the municipalities of Saint-Louis (MRC Les Maskoutains) and Sainte-Victoire (MRC Pierre-De Saurel), in the administrative region of Montérégie, on the South Shore of St. Lawrence River, in Quebec, Canada.

The economic vocation of this hydrographic slope is essentially agricultural.

== Geography ==
The Lemoine River has its source in an agricultural zone at the confluence of the "Décharge des Huit" stream in the municipality of Saint-Louis. This source is located near Chemin du Rang Prescott (north side).

From its source, the course of the Lemoine river descends on 9.0 kilometres (5.6 mi) almost entirely in agricultural zone, with a drop of 9 metres (30 ft), according to the following segments:

- 2.3 kilometres (1.4 mi) north-west, up to the Saint-Robert stream (coming from the east);
- 3.0 kilometres (1.9 mi) west, to the bridge on Chemin du Rang Prescott;
- 3.7 kilometres (2.3 mi) first south-west, curving south, then down north-west to its mouth.

The mouth of the Lemoine river corresponds to the confluence of the Benoit stream and is the source of the rivière Pot au Beurre. From there, the current flows down the latter over 25.6 kilometres (15.9 mi) to the Yamaska River.

== Toponymy ==
The term "Lemoine" turns out to be a family name of French origin.

The toponym "rivière Lemoine" was made official on January 21, 1975, in the place name bank of the Commission de toponymie du Québec.

== See also ==
- List of rivers of Quebec
