= Salvail =

Salvail is a French surname.

Notable people with this surname include:

- Éric Salvail (born 1969), Canadian radio and television personality
- Ève Salvail (born 1973), Canadian model

== See also ==
- Salvail River, Quebec, Canada
