= Petite rivière Bellevue =

River in Montérégie, Quebec (Canada)

- Location within Quebec

Location
- Country: Canada
- Province: Quebec
- Region: Montérégie
- RCM: Pierre-De Saurel Regional County Municipality

Physical characteristics
- Source: Agricultural stream
  - location: Sainte-Victoire-de-Sorel
  - coordinates: 45.95553°N 73.02733°W
  - elevation: 22 m (72 ft)
- Mouth: Lemoine River
  - location: Sainte-Victoire-de-Sorel
  - coordinates: 45.92278°N 73.08945°W
  - elevation: 16 m (52 ft)
- Length: 7.8 km (4.8 mi)

Basin features
- Progression: Lemoine River, Rivière Pot au Beurre, Yamaska River, Saint Lawrence River
- Tributaries
  - left: (upstream) décharge des Douze, décharge des Dix-Huit.
  - right: (upstream) décharge des Terres Noires.

The Petite rivière Bellevue (in English: little Bellevue river) is a tributary of the Lemoine River. It flows entirely in the municipality of Sainte-Victoire in the Pierre-De Saurel Regional County Municipality (MRC), in the administrative region of Montérégie, on the South Shore of St. Lawrence River, in Quebec, Canada.

The economic vocation of this hydrographic slope is essentially agricultural. The course of the river also crosses some forest islands.

== Geography ==
The Lemoine River has its source in an agricultural zone on the east side of chemin du rang Bellevue in the municipality of Sainte-Victoire-de-Sorel.

From its source, the course of the Lemoine river descends on 7.8 kilometres (4.8 mi) almost entirely in agricultural zone, with a drop of 6 metres (20 ft), according to the following segments:

- 3.0 kilometres (1.9 mi) southbound, crossing the Montée Sainte-Victoire (road), up to the confluence of Décharge des Dix-Huit (coming from the east);
- 2.9 kilometres (1.8 mi) west, up to the confluence of Décharge des Terres Noires (coming from the Nord);
- 1.9 kilometres (1.2 mi) south-west, crossing the chemin du Rang Prescott, to its mouth.

The mouth of the Petite rivière Bellevue empties on the north shore of Lemoine River which flow north to the rivière Pot au Beurre (a tributary of the west shore of Yamaska River.

== Toponymy ==
The toponym "Petite rivière Bellevue" was made official on May 31, 1983, in the place name bank of the Commission de toponymie du Québec.

== See also ==
- List of rivers of Quebec
