= St-Robert meteorite =

Meteorite found in Canada

St-Robert
- Type: Chondrite
- Class: Ordinary chondrite
- Group: H5
- Composition: olivine Fa18.4, pyroxene Fs18.5; contains 20% Ni-Fe, 10% FeS.
- Weathering grade: W0
- Country: Canada
- Region: Quebec
- Coordinates: 45°58′N 73°00′W
- Observed fall: Yes
- Fall date: June 14, 1994. 8:02pm EDT
- TKW: 25.4 kilograms (56 lb)

St-Robert is an ordinary chondrite meteorite that fell in Quebec on June 14, 1994.

== History ==
The entry of a ~2 tonne meteoroid into the Earth's atmosphere produced a daylight fireball visible from Quebec, Ontario, New Hampshire, Vermont and New York. The terminal point of the fireball was located 50 kilometres (31 mi) northeast of Montreal, Quebec at an altitude of ~36 kilometres (22 mi). A sonic boom shook the entire Montreal region as the fireball passed overhead. The fireball was recorded by satellites maintained by the U.S. Department of Defense and seismographic stations within Canada. Observers in the area of Saint-Robert who witnessed the terminal explosion also heard the fragments falling and striking the earth.

The first mass was recovered within minutes of the fall, from a 25 centimetres (9.8 in) deep pit, 3 kilometres (1.9 mi) east of Saint-Robert by Stephane Forcier. The stone was cold to the touch. Over the next three months 20 other stones were recovered from shallow pits, with largest weighing 6.5 kilograms (14 lb).

== See also ==
- Glossary of meteoritics
- Meteorite fall
