= Salvail River =

River in Montérégie, Quebec, Canada

Location
- Country: Canada
- Province: Quebec
- Region: Montérégie
- Regional County Municipality: Les Maskoutains Regional County Municipality

Physical characteristics
- Source: "Décharge de Devant Sud de Salvail" and "ruisseau Desgranges"
  - location: La Présentation
  - coordinates: 45°40′35″N 73°04′23″W
  - elevation: 28 m (92 ft)
- Mouth: Yamaska River
  - location: Saint-Louis
  - coordinates: 45.825°N 72.96083°W
  - elevation: 5 m (16 ft)
- Length: 22.9 km (14.2 mi)

Basin features
- Tributaries
  - left: (Upstream) ruisseaux: Décharge Neuve, Décharge des Vingt, Décharge des Onze, François-Morin, des Trois-Arpents, Arthur-Riendeau, Décharge Zéphirin-Fortin, Décharge du devant du Cinquième rang, Décharge des Douze, Décharge des Quatrième et Cinquième Concessions, Décharge des Quinze du Bas du Quatrième rang, Desgranges.
  - right: (Upstream) ruisseaux: Première décharge, Vigeant, Des Prairies, Débouche Martin, Cournoyer, Rouge, de la Coulée de Salvail, Décharge de-Devant-Sud-de-Salvail.

The Salvail River is a tributary of the Yamaska River. It flows northeast through the municipalities of La Présentation, Saint-Jude and Saint-Louis in the Les Maskoutains Regional County Municipality (MRC), in the administrative region of Montérégie, on the South Shore of Saint Lawrence River, in Quebec, Canada.

== Geography ==
The main neighboring hydrographic slopes of the Salvail river are:

- North side: Yamaska River, rivière Pot au Beurre;
- East side: Yamaska River;
- South side: rivière des Hurons;
- West side: Amyot River, Richelieu River.

The Salvail River has its source in the small hamlet of "Salvail", located along the route 137, connecting the village of La Presentation and Saint-Denis-sur-Richelieu. At this point, the river begins at the confluence of the "Décharge de Devant Sud de Salvail" (coming from the south) and the "Ruisseau Desgranges" (coming from the southwest). The course of the river flows north-east, passing north-west of the village of La Présentation, while the river crosses boulevard Laframboise.

Almost all of its course, the river is bordered by a rural road, especially on the south side. A second discontinuous road starting at Boulevard Laframboise borders the river on the northwest side. The Salvail river flows north-east, generally in an agricultural zone (sometimes forest).

Upper course of the river (segment of 15.3 kilometres (9.5 mi))

In its first segment, the river flows on 10.0 kilometres (6.2 mi) towards the northeast, winding up to the mouth of Red Creek (coming from the southeast); on 0.5 kilometres (0.31 mi) north to "Point du jour" stream; on 1.8 kilometres (1.1 mi) north-east to the Zéphirin-Fortin landfill (coming from the north-west); on 3.0 kilometres (1.9 mi) towards the northeast collecting water from the Arthur-Riendeau landfill (coming from the north), to route 235 (designated " chemin de Massueville "in this segment), just north of the village of Saint-Jude.

Course downstream of route 235 (segment of 7.6 kilometres (4.7 mi))

From route 235, the river flows on 7.6 kilometres (4.7 mi) towards the northeast, winding up to its mouth.

The Salvail River empties on the west bank of the Yamaska River, in a bend in the river. Its mouth is located east of Rang Bourgchemin Ouest road.

== Toponymy ==
The name of Salvail appears on maps of Quebec from XVIIth Century. A fairly large Salvail family then took up residence on the banks of this river and called it. The ancestor Pierre, Sieur de Fromont, son of Jean-Baptiste Salvaye and Jacquette Belle, originates from Mediterranean countries, being from the diocese of Genoa. This captain, former comrade in arms of Sieur Pierre de Saint-Ours., will marry Adhémar by notary contract. from Quebec in November 1673, Catherine Le Roy native of Paris, Île-de-France. The couple settled in Sorel before 1675.

The toponym "Rivière Salvail" was officially registered on December 5, 1968, in the Bank of place names of the Commission de toponymie du Québec.

== See also ==
- List of rivers of Quebec
