= Rivière Pot au Beurre (Yamaska River tributary) =

River in Montérégie, Quebec (Canada)

Location
- Country: Canada
- Province: Quebec
- Region: Montérégie
- MRC: Pierre-De Saurel Regional County Municipality
- Municipality: Yamaska, Sainte-Victoire-de-Sorel

Physical characteristics
- Source: Lemoine River and ruisseau des Benoit
  - location: Sainte-Victoire-de-Sorel
  - coordinates: 45°56′18″N 73°05′47″W
  - elevation: 18 m (59 ft)
- Mouth: Yamaska River
  - location: Yamaska
  - coordinates: 45°04′50″N 72°57′06″W
  - elevation: 6 m (20 ft)
- Length: 25.6 km (15.9 mi)

Basin features
- Tributaries
  - left: (upward) ruisseaux: décharge des Cinq, décharge des Dix, décharge des Vingt, décharge des Quarante, décharge des Dix de la Baie, ruisseau des Tillon, ruisseau Benoit.
  - right: (upward) ruisseaux: Petite rivière Pot au Beurre, Bellevue River, ruisseau Champagne, ruisseau Cournoyer, décharge du Couvent, Lemoine River

The Rivière Pot au Beurre is a tributary of the Yamaska River. It flows northeast through the municipalities of Sainte-Victoire-de-Sorel, Sorel-Tracy and Yamaska in the Pierre-De Saurel Regional County Municipality (MRC), in the administrative region of Montérégie, on the South Shore of Saint Lawrence River, in Quebec, Canada.

== Geography ==
The main neighboring hydrographic slopes of the Pot-au-Beurre river are:

- North side: Yamaska River, lake Saint-Pierre;
- East side: Lemoine River, Yamaska River;
- South side: Lemoine River, Petite rivière Bellevue, Salvail River;
- West side: Richelieu River.

The "Pot au Beurre river" has its source at 1.3 kilometres (0.81 mi) (in direct line) south of the village of Sainte-Victoire-de-Sorel, in Montérégie. Its source is located in an agricultural zone at the confluence of the Lemoine river (coming from the south-east) and the Benoit stream (coming from the south-west).

From its source, the Pot au Beurre river flows over 25.6 kilometres (15.9 mi), with a drop of 12 metres (39 ft) according to the following segments:

Course from the source (segment of 1.9 kilometres (1.2 mi))

From this confluence, the "Rivière Pot au Beurre" first flows on 1.9 kilometres (1.2 mi) towards the north, winding through agricultural land to route 239 which it crosses at 0.7 kilometres (0.43 mi) west of the center of the village of Sainte-Victoire-de-Sorel. In this first segment, the river is bordered by Chemin du Rang Fleury (to the east) and Chemin du Rang Nord (to the west).

Course downstream of route 239 (segment of 11.5 kilometres (7.1 mi))

Its course continues on 2.5 kilometres (1.6 mi) towards the northeast in an agricultural zone up to the Cournoyer stream (coming from the east); 7.5 kilometres (4.7 mi) north-east to the mouth of "Ruisseau des Tillon" (coming from the south-west); 1.5 kilometres (0.93 mi) northeast to route 132. In this second segment, the river is bordered by Chemin Sainte-Victoire (to the east) and Chemin du Rang Nord (to the west).

Course downstream of route 132 (segment of 12.2 kilometres (7.6 mi))

The course of the river continues on 4.3 kilometres (2.7 mi) towards the north-east in an agricultural zone to the mouth of the Bellevue river (coming from the south); then 3.0 kilometres (1.9 mi) towards the northeast in a marsh area to the mouth of the "Petite rivière au Beurre" (coming from the south); then 4.9 kilometres (3.0 mi) north-east in a marsh area to its mouth.

The "Rivière Pot au Beurre" empties on the west bank of the Yamaska River, at the height of the northern tip of Île Saint-Jean. Its mouth is located 0.4 kilometres (0.25 mi) upstream from Rouche Island, on the Yamaska River.

The basin has dense and artificialized ramifications . They are an indicator of the impermeability of the soil, which requires drainage, given that it is located in an area where agriculture is practiced intensively. The majority of its tributaries are straightened agricultural ditches .

The Pot au Beurre river drains a watershed of 210 kilometres (130.49 mi). In total, its basin includes 607 kilometres (377 mi) of .

== Toponymy ==
The origin of this toponym remains ambiguous. In the past, in summer, residents used to keep their butter in a cool place in a container called a "butter pot", by immersing it in wells or the waters of this river, especially in deeper pits or in pits. cold source areas. The cartographer Joseph Bouchette designated this watercourse "Rivière Pot au Beurre" in his "Topographical Description of the Province of Lower Canada (1815)".

In Quebec, another river bears the name "Pot au Beurre". The latter flows at the limit of the municipalities of Saint-Pierre-de-l'Île-d'Orléans and Sainte-Famille on the island of Orleans. This Orleans toponym is indicated in 1722 in the delimitation of the parish of Sainte-Famille. Known variants: "Première rivière Pot au Beurre"; "Ruisseau du Dragage".

The toponym "Rivière Pot-au-Beurre" was officially registered on December 5, 1968, at the Commission de toponymie du Québec.

== See also ==
- List of rivers of Quebec

== Bibliography ==
- Yamaska watershed organization, ed. (2014). Water master plan.
