= Saint-Bernard-de-Michaudville =

- Municipality
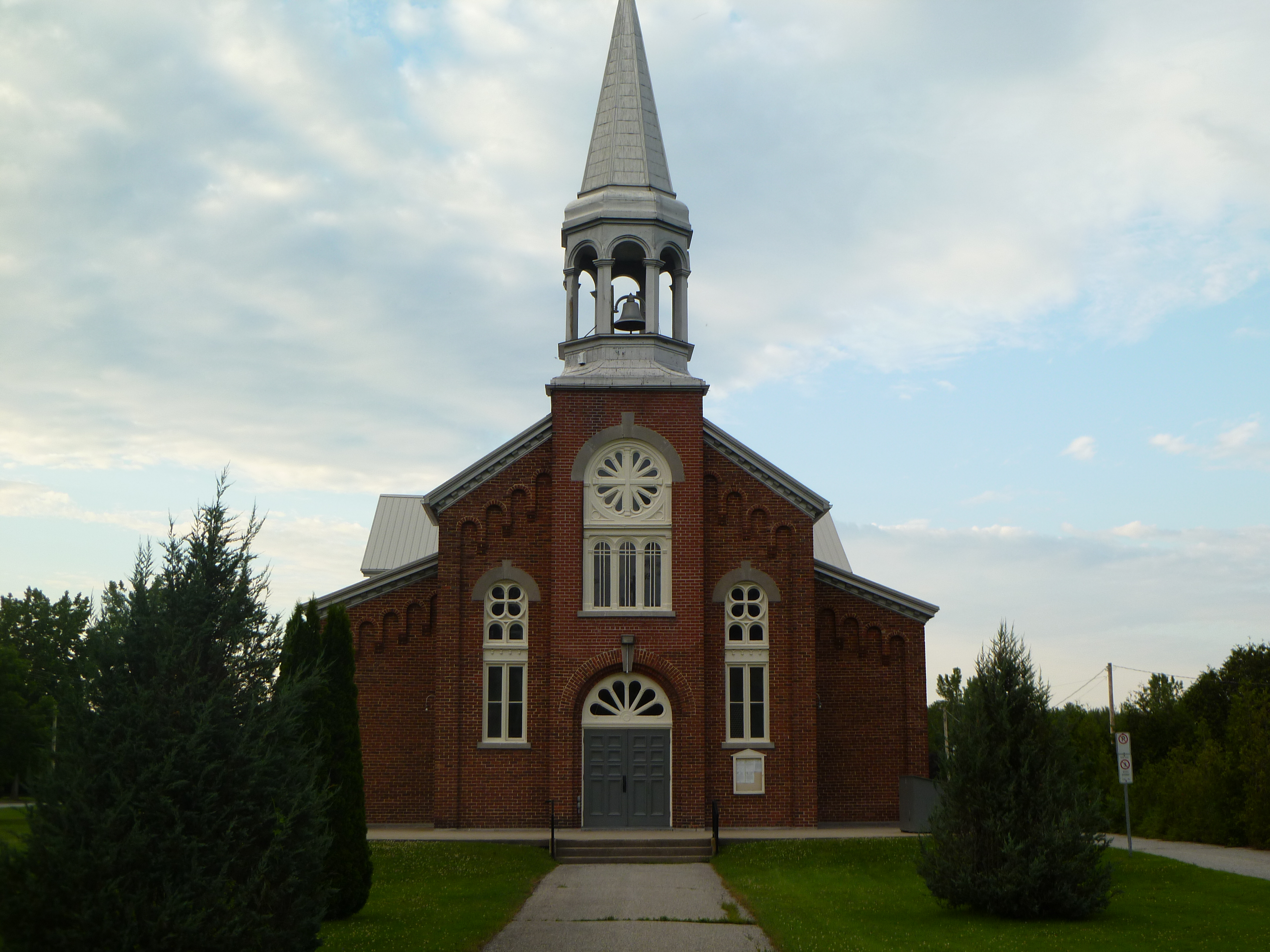
- Motto: Intensité, générosité et engagement (Intensity, generosity and commitment)
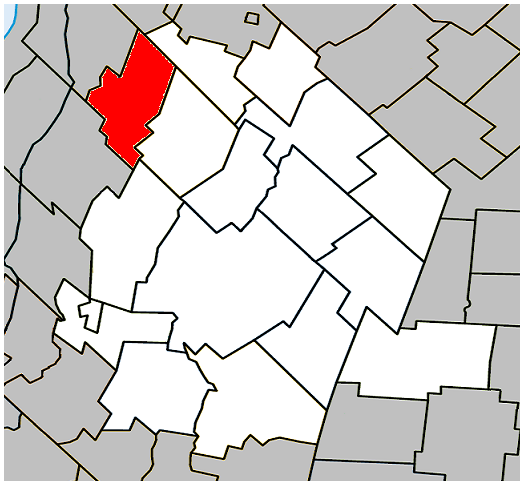
- Location within Les Maskoutains RCM

- Location in southern Quebec
- Coordinates: 45°50′N 73°04′W
- Country: Canada
- Province: Quebec
- Region: Montérégie
- RCM: Les Maskoutains
- Constituted: August 31, 1908

Government
  - Mayor: Guy Robert
  - Federal riding: Saint-Hyacinthe—Bagot—Acton
  - Prov. riding: Richelieu

Area
  - Total: 65.90 km^{2} (25.44 sq mi)
  - Land: 66.05 km^{2} (25.50 sq mi)

Population (2021)
  - Total: 616
  - Density: 9.3/km^{2} (24/sq mi)
  - Pop 2016-2021: ▲5.1%
  - Dwellings: 275
- Time zone: UTC−5 (EST)
  - Summer (DST): UTC−4 (EDT)
- Postal code(s): J0H 1C0
- Area codes: 450 and 579
- Highways: No major routes
- Website: saintbernarddemichaudville.qc.ca

Saint-Bernard-de-Michaudville is a municipality in southwestern Quebec, Canada in the Regional County Municipality of Les Maskoutains. The population as of the Canada 2021 Census was 616. The community was officially renamed from the Parish of Saint-Bernard-Partie-Sud to the Municipality of Saint-Bernard-de-Michaudville on July 19, 1997.

== Demographics ==
=== Population ===
Canada census – Saint-Bernard-de-Michaudville community profile

	2021	2016	2011
Population	616 (+5.1% from 2016)	586 (+12.5% from 2011)	521 (+7.2% from 2006)
Land area	66.05 km^{2} (25.50 sq mi)	66.05 km^{2} (25.50 sq mi)	65.49 km^{2} (25.29 sq mi)
Population density	9.3/km^{2} (24/sq mi)	8.9/km^{2} (23/sq mi)	8.0/km^{2} (21/sq mi)
Median age	41.6 (M: 42, F: 40)	40.8 (M: 39.9, F: 41.5)	40.1 (M: 42.0, F: 39.1)
Private dwellings	260 (total)	259 (total)	221 (total)
Median household income		$57,088	$65,432

References: 2021 2016 2011

Historical Census Data - Saint-Bernard-de-Michaudville, Quebec
Year	Pop.	±%
1991	586	—
1996	607	+3.6%
2001	592	−2.5%
2006	486	−17.9%
2011	521	+7.2%
2016	586	+12.5%
2021	616	+5.1%

=== Language ===
Canada Census Mother Tongue - Saint-Bernard-de-Michaudville, Quebec
Census	Total	French			English			French & English			Other		
Year	Responses	Count	Trend	Pop %	Count	Trend	Pop %	Count	Trend	Pop %	Count	Trend	Pop %
2016	585	575	▲12.7%	98.3%	5	▲ n/a	0.9%	5	▲ n/a	0.9%	5	▼50.0%	0.9%
2011	520	510	▲5.2%	98.1%	0	0.0%	0.0%	0	0.0%	0.0%	10	▲ n/a%	1.9%
2006	485	485	▼13.4%	100.0%	0	▼100.0%	0.0%	0	0.0%	0.0%	0	▼100.0%	0.0%
2001	590	560	▼1.8%	94.9%	15	0.0%	2.5%	0	0.0%	0.0%	15	▲50.0%	2.5%
1996	595	570	n/a	95.8%	15	n/a	2.5%	0	n/a	0.0%	10	n/a	1.7%

== See also ==
- List of municipalities in Quebec
