= Saint-Robert, Quebec =

Saint-Robert
- Municipality
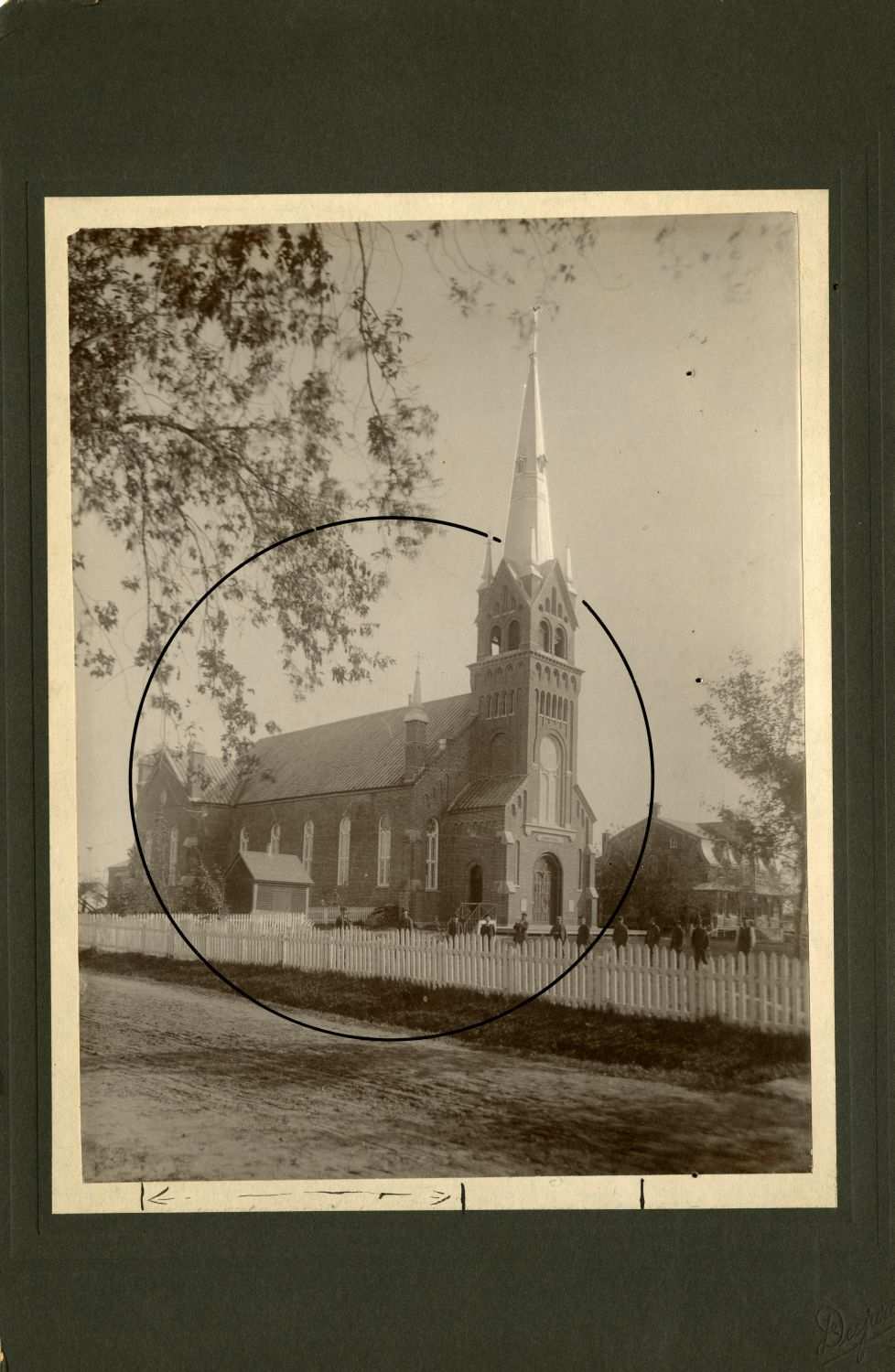

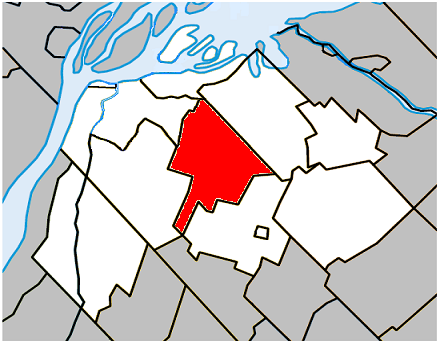
- Location within Pierre-De Saurel RCM.

- Location in southern Quebec.
- Coordinates: 45°58′N 73°00′W
- Country: Canada
- Province: Quebec
- Region: Montérégie
- RCM: Pierre-De Saurel
- Constituted: October 17, 1857

Government
  - Mayor: Gilles Salvas
  - Federal riding: Bécancour—Nicolet—Saurel—Alnôbak
  - Prov. riding: Richelieu

Area
  - Total: 64.60 km^{2} (24.94 sq mi)
  - Land: 64.97 km^{2} (25.09 sq mi)
- There is an apparent contradiction between two authoritative sources

Population (2021)
  - Total: 1,813
  - Density: 27.9/km^{2} (72/sq mi)
  - Pop 2016-2021: ▲0.6%
  - Dwellings: 802
- Time zone: UTC−5 (EST)
  - Summer (DST): UTC−4 (EDT)
- Postal code(s): J0G 1S0
- Area codes: 450 and 579
- Highways: R-132; R-239
- Website: www.saintrobert.qc.ca

Saint-Robert (French pronunciation: [sɛ̃ ʁɔbɛʁ]) is a municipality southeast of Sorel-Tracy in the Regional county municipality of Pierre-De Saurel, in Montérégie, Quebec. The population as of the Canada 2021 Census was 1,813. About 20 meteorites from the St-Robert meteorite shower were found here.

== Demographics ==
=== Population ===
Population trend:

Census	Population	Change (%)
2021	1,813	▲0.6%
2016	1,803	▲0.5%
2011	1,794	▲4.7%
2006	1,713	▼4.5%
2001	1,793	▼5.9%
1996	1,905	▲3.1%
1991	1,848	▲0.1%
1986	1,846	▲1.3%
1981	1,823	▲13.2%
1976	1,611	▲10.5%
1971	1,458	▲5.2%
1966	1,386	▲11.3%
1961	1,245	▼9.8%
1956	1,381	▲9.3%
1951	1,263	▲2.0%
1941	1,238	▼5.8%
1931	1,314	▼0.2%
1921	1,316	▼8.0%
1911	1,431	▼8.4%
1901	1,562	▼16.9%
1891	1,879	▼11.6%
1881	2,126	▲40.2%
1871	1,516	▲10.7%
1861	1,369	N/A

=== Language ===
Mother tongue language (2021)

Language	Population	Pct (%)
French only	1,745	96.1%
English only	20	1.1%
Both English & French	10	0.6%
Other languages	30	1.7%

== See also ==
- List of municipalities in Quebec
