= Saint-Jude, Quebec =

Saint-Jude
- Municipality
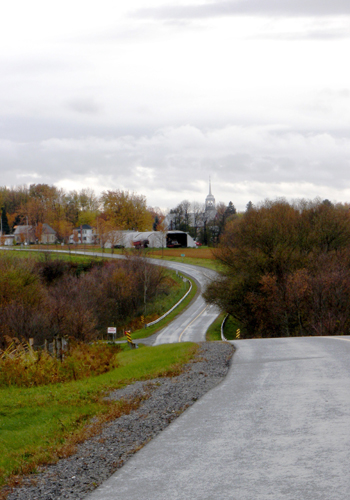

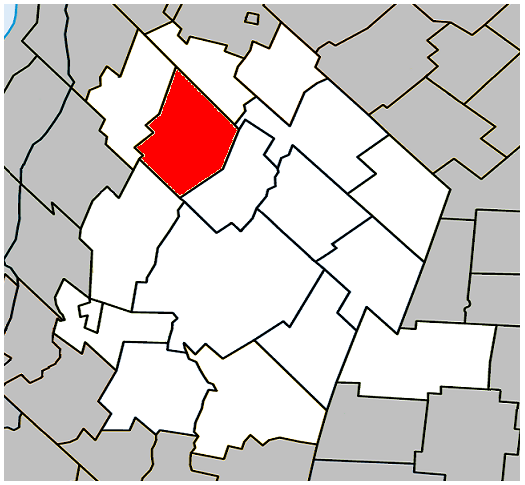
- Location within Les Maskoutains RCM

- Location in southern Quebec
- Coordinates: 45°46′N 72°59′W
- Country: Canada
- Province: Quebec
- Region: Montérégie
- RCM: Les Maskoutains
- Constituted: July 1, 1855

Government
  - Mayor: Annick Corbeil
  - Federal riding: Saint-Hyacinthe—Bagot—Acton
  - Prov. riding: Richelieu

Area
  - Total: 77.90 km^{2} (30.08 sq mi)
  - Land: 77.32 km^{2} (29.85 sq mi)

Population (2011)
  - Total: 1,235
  - Density: 16/km^{2} (41/sq mi)
  - Pop 2006-2011: ▲9.3%
  - Dwellings: 495
- Time zone: UTC−5 (EST)
  - Summer (DST): UTC−4 (EDT)
- Postal code(s): J0H 1P0
- Area codes: 450 and 579
- Highways: R-235
- Website: www.saint-jude.ca

Saint-Jude (French pronunciation: [sɛ̃ ʒyd]) is a municipality in southwestern Quebec, Canada in the Regional County Municipality of Les Maskoutains. The population as of the Canada 2011 Census was 1,235.

== Demographics ==
=== Population ===
Canada census – Saint-Jude community profile

	2021	2011
Population	1,326 (+9.2% from 2016)	1,235 (+9.3% from 2006)
Land area	77.33 km^{2} (29.86 sq mi)	77.32 km^{2} (29.85 sq mi)
Population density	17.1/km^{2} (44/sq mi)	16.0/km^{2} (41/sq mi)
Median age	40 (M: 39.6, F: 40.4)	36.9 (M: 37.8, F: 36.4)
Private dwellings	525 (total)	495 (total)
Median household income		$47,068

References: 2021 2011

Historical Census Data - Saint-Jude, Quebec
Year	Pop.	±%
1991	1,133	—
1996	1,143	+0.9%
2001	1,126	−1.5%
2006	1,130	+0.4%
2011	1,235	+9.3%

=== Language ===
Canada Census Mother Tongue - Saint-Jude, Quebec
Census	Total	French			English			French & English			Other		
Year	Responses	Count	Trend	Pop %	Count	Trend	Pop %	Count	Trend	Pop %	Count	Trend	Pop %
2011	1,230	1,205	▲10.0%	97.97%	10	▲ n/a%	0.81%	5	▼50.0%	0.41%	10	▼50.0%	0.81%
2006	1,125	1,095	▼0.9%	97.33%	0	0.0%	0.00%	10	▲ n/a%	0.89%	20	0.0%	1.78%
2001	1,125	1,105	▲1.8%	98.22%	0	▼100.0%	0.00%	0	0.0%	0.00%	20	▲100.0%	1.78%
1996	0	1,085	n/a	0.00%	45	n/a	0.00%	0	n/a	0.00%	10	n/a	0.00%

== Communities ==
- Saint-Jude

== See also ==
- List of municipalities in Quebec
