= Saint-Louis, Quebec =

Saint-Louis
- Municipality
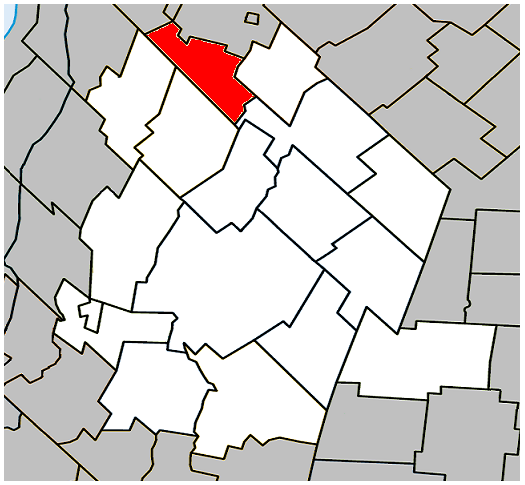
- Location within Les Maskoutains RCM.

- Location in southern Quebec.
- Coordinates: 45°51′N 72°59′W
- Country: Canada
- Province: Quebec
- Region: Montérégie
- RCM: Les Maskoutains
- Constituted: August 29, 1881

Government
  - Mayor: Yvon Daigle
  - Federal riding: Saint-Hyacinthe—Bagot—Acton
  - Prov. riding: Richelieu

Area
  - Total: 48.40 km^{2} (18.69 sq mi)
  - Land: 47.07 km^{2} (18.17 sq mi)

Population (2011)
  - Total: 775
  - Density: 16.5/km^{2} (43/sq mi)
  - Pop 2006-2011: ▲6.7%
  - Dwellings: 369
- Time zone: UTC−5 (EST)
  - Summer (DST): UTC−4 (EDT)
- Postal code(s): J0G 1K0
- Area codes: 450 and 579
- Highways: R-235
- Website: mun-st-louis.qc.ca

Saint-Louis (French pronunciation: [sɛ̃ lwi]) is a municipality in southwestern Quebec, Canada in the Regional County Municipality of Les Maskoutains. The population as of the Canada 2011 Census was 775.

== Demographics ==
=== Population ===
Canada census – Saint-Louis community profile

	2021	2011
Population	740 (+3.9% from 2016)	775 (+6.7% from 2006)
Land area	47.21 km^{2} (18.23 sq mi)	47.07 km^{2} (18.17 sq mi)
Population density	15.7/km^{2} (41/sq mi)	16.5/km^{2} (43/sq mi)
Median age	45.2 (M: 44.4, F: 45.6)	43.7 (M: 43.8, F: 43.6)
Private dwellings	330 (total)	369 (total)
Median household income		$50,303

References: 2021 2011

Historical Census Data - Saint-Louis, Quebec

Year	Pop.	±%
1991	711	—
1996	715	+0.6%

Year	Pop.	±%
2001	758	+6.0%
2006	726	−4.2%

Year	Pop.	±%
2011	775	+6.7%

=== Language ===
Canada Census Mother Tongue - Saint-Louis, Quebec
Census	Total	French			English			French & English			Other		
Year	Responses	Count	Trend	Pop %	Count	Trend	Pop %	Count	Trend	Pop %	Count	Trend	Pop %
2011	775	755	▲7.9%	97.42%	5	▼50.0%	0.64%	5	▼50.0%	0.64%	10	0.0%	1.29%
2006	730	700	▼7.9%	95.89%	10	▲ n/a%	1.37%	10	▲ n/a%	1.37%	10	▲ n/a%	1.37%
2001	760	760	▲6.3%	100.00%	0	0.0%	0.00%	0	0.0%	0.00%	0	0.0%	0.00%
1996	715	715	n/a	100.00%	0	n/a	0.00%	0	n/a	0.00%	0	n/a	0.00%

== See also ==
- List of municipalities in Quebec
