= Yamaska =

- Municipality
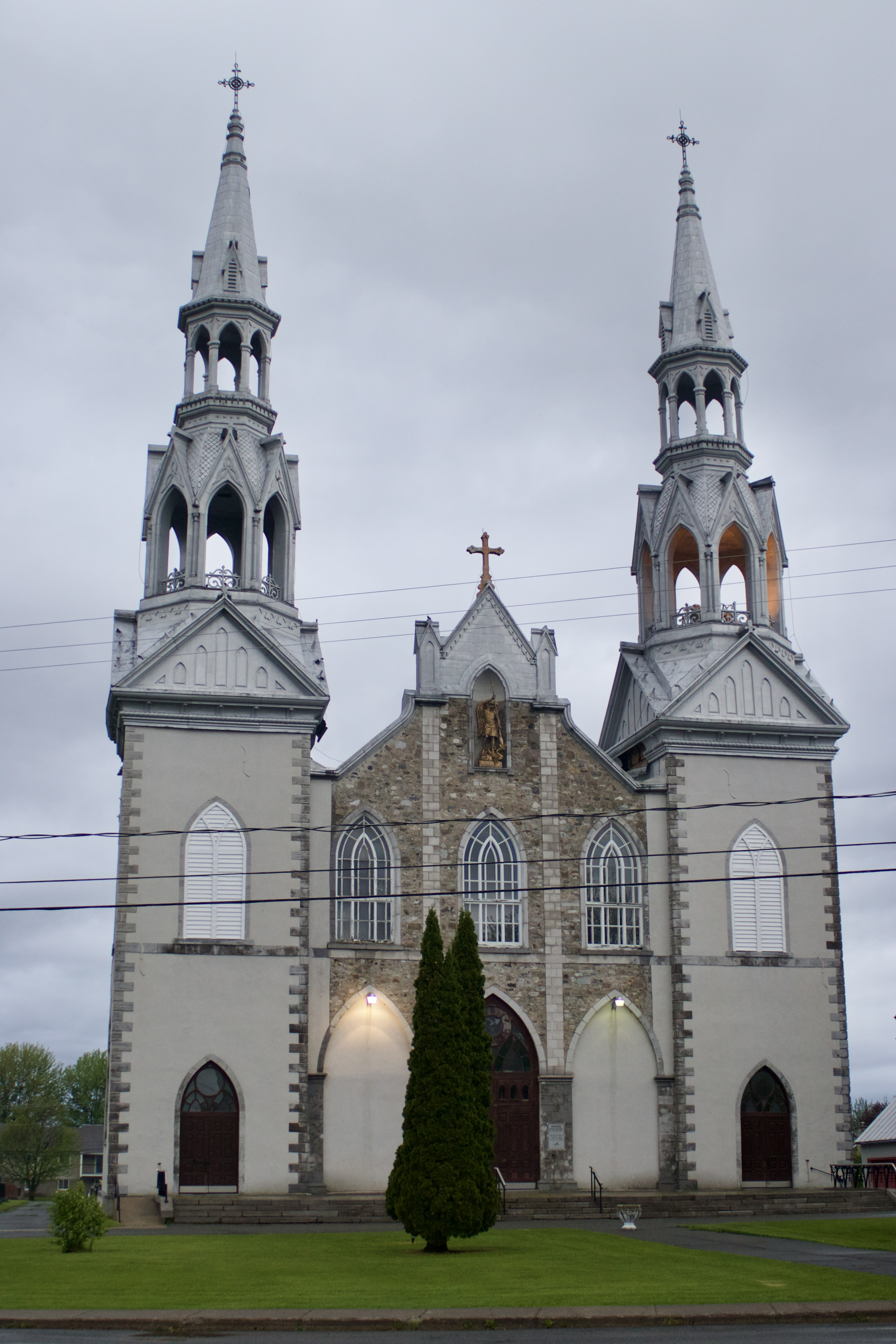
- Facade of Église Saint-Michel

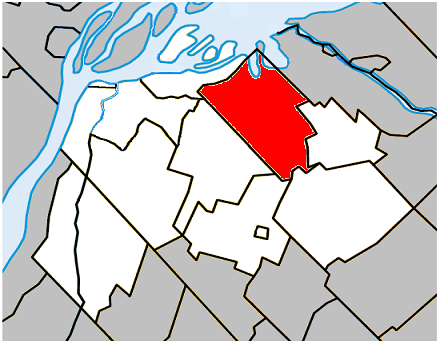
- Location within Pierre-De Saurel RCM

- Location in southern Quebec
- Coordinates: 46.0081°N 72.9167°W
- Country: Canada
- Province: Quebec
- Region: Montérégie
- RCM: Pierre-De Saurel
- Constituted: December 19, 2001
- Named for: Yamaska River

Government
  - Mayor: François Martin
  - Federal riding: Bécancour—Nicolet—Saurel—Alnôbak
  - Prov. riding: Richelieu

Area
  - Total: 76.60 km^{2} (29.58 sq mi)
  - Land: 72.82 km^{2} (28.12 sq mi)

Population (2021)
  - Total: 1,736
  - Density: 23.8/km^{2} (62/sq mi)
  - Pop 2016-2021: ▲2.9%
  - Dwellings: 932
- Time zone: UTC−5 (EST)
  - Summer (DST): UTC−4 (EDT)
- Postal code(s): J0G 1W0 & J0G 1X0
- Area codes: 450 and 579
- Highways: R-132; R-235
- Website: www.yamaska.ca

Yamaska (French pronunciation: [jamaska]) is a municipality in the Pierre-De Saurel Regional County Municipality, in the Montérégie region of Quebec. The population as of the Canada 2021 Census was 1,736.

== Demographics ==
=== Population ===
Population trend:

| Census | Population | Change (%) |
|---|---|---|
| 2021 | 1,736 | ▲2.9% |
| 2016 | 1,687 | ▲2.6% |
| 2011 | 1,644 | ▲0.1% |
| 2006 | 1,643 | N/A |

=== Language ===
Mother tongue language (2021)

| Language | Population | Pct (%) |
|---|---|---|
| French only | 1,670 | 97.4% |
| English only | 20 | 1.2% |
| Both English & French | 15 | 0.9% |
| Other languages | 10 | 0.6% |

== See also ==
- List of municipalities in Quebec
