= Sainte-Victoire-de-Sorel =

- Municipality
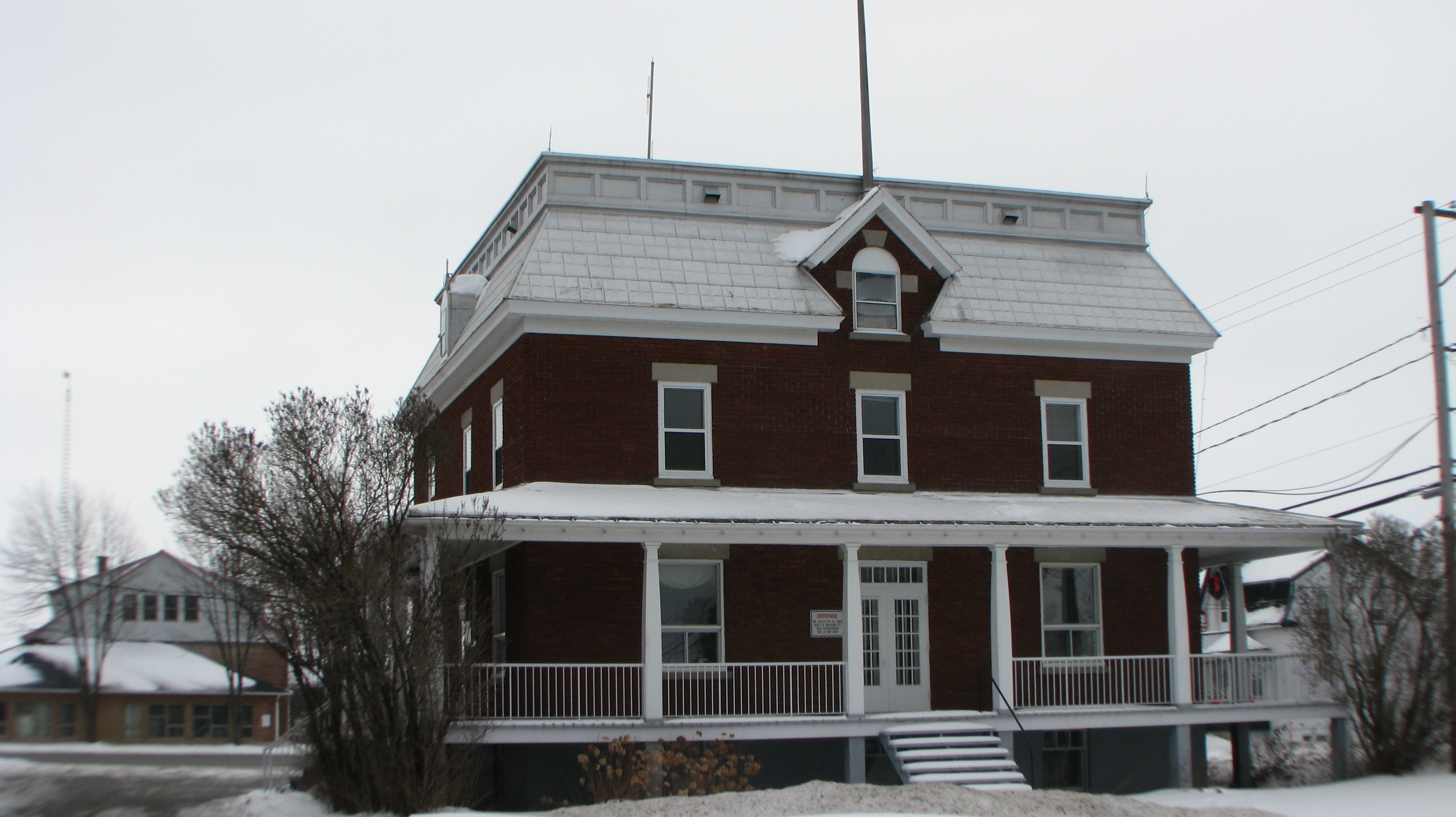

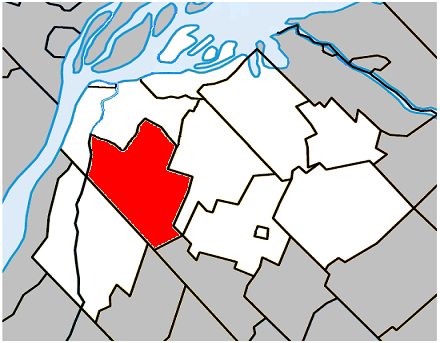
- Location within Pierre-De Saurel RCM

- Location in southern Quebec
- Coordinates: 45°57′N 73°05′W
- Country: Canada
- Province: Quebec
- Region: Montérégie
- RCM: Pierre-De Saurel
- Constituted: July 1, 1855

Government
  - Mayor: Michel Aucoin
  - Federal riding: Bécancour—Nicolet—Saurel—Alnôbak
  - Prov. riding: Richelieu

Area
  - Total: 76.30 km^{2} (29.46 sq mi)
  - Land: 74.75 km^{2} (28.86 sq mi)

Population (2011)
  - Total: 2,501
  - Density: 33.5/km^{2} (87/sq mi)
  - Pop 2006-2011: ▲3.8%
  - Dwellings: 1,109
- Time zone: UTC−5 (EST)
  - Summer (DST): UTC−4 (EDT)
- Postal code(s): J0G 1T0
- Area codes: 450 and 579
- Highways: R-133; R-239
- Website: www.saintevictoire desorel.qc.ca

Sainte-Victoire-de-Sorel (French pronunciation: [sɛ̃t viktwaʁ də sɔʁɛl]) is a municipality located in the Pierre-De Saurel Regional County Municipality of Quebec (Canada), in the administrative region of Montérégie. The population as of the Canada 2011 Census was 2,501.

== Demographics ==
=== Population ===
Population trend:

Census	Population	Change (%)
2011	2,501	▲3.8%
2006	2,410	▲3.8%
2001	2,321	▲0.1%
1996	2,318	▲8.0%
1991	2,146	N/A

=== Language ===
Mother tongue language (2006)

Language	Population	Pct (%)
French only	2,405	100.00%
English only	0	0.00%
Both English & French	0	0.00%
Other languages	0	0.00%

== See also ==
- List of municipalities in Quebec
