= List of state highways in Vermont =

- Standard markers for Interstates, US highways, state-maintained and locally maintained state highways in Vermont.

Highway names
- Interstates: Interstate X (I-X)
- US Highways: U.S. Route X (US X)
- State: Vermont Route X (VT Route X, VT X)

System links
- State highways in Vermont

The following is a list of state highways in Vermont as designated by the Vermont Agency of Transportation (VTrans). The classification of these state highways fall under three primary categories: Interstate Highways, U.S. Highways, and Vermont routes. Routes in Vermont are abbreviated as "VT #" by VTrans and also abbreviated as "VT Route #" and "Route #" in common usage. A small number of minor state highways, typically bypassing old alignments or short connector routes, are instead assigned names and unsigned four-digit numbers beginning with 9. Most state highways are maintained by VTrans; however, portions of some routes and some entire routes are maintained by local governments, such as towns or cities, instead. These town-maintained routes are internally called "state-designated town highways" and are typically designated as "class 2 town highways", or, in downtown areas "class 1 town highways". Many of Vermont's state-numbered highways retain their numbers from when they were part of the New England road marking system of the 1920s; for instance, VT 9 was part of Route 9 of the New England system.

Prior to 1995, Vermont used the standard circular highway shield to sign all of its routes, which had black numerals on a white circle over a black background. In 1995, Vermont introduced a new shield for state-maintained highways—a green shield with the word "Vermont" at the top. The circular highway shield continues to be used for locally maintained routes. Some state-maintained routes are still signed with the circular highway shield, but they are being converted to the newer Vermont shield as signs are replaced. Recent guide sign replacement projects along Vermont's Interstate Highways include the newer green shields to indicate Vermont state routes, as the older guide signs used the circular shield.

According to Vermont's 2012 Fact Book the state spent $547 million in 2011. Less than half ($206 million) on preservation and maintenance. 28% of the roads remain in "very poor" condition. The book estimates $100 million would be required to reduce that to 25%. The VTrans report to the legislature in 2012 appeared to disagree, stating that the goal of 25% in poor condition had been met. The Burlington Free Press conducted a survey on 11% of the roads and found that signage was inadequate, often not warning drivers of dangerous curves; striping was inadequate, having been scraped off by winter snowplowing. Therefore, sides of the road could not be seen at night. Speed limit signs were placed near villages but nowhere else; guardrails were unpredictably placed. A spokesperson for VTrans agreed, citing fiscal restraints. Troopers investigating accidents are not required to record road conditions which may have contributed to an accident.

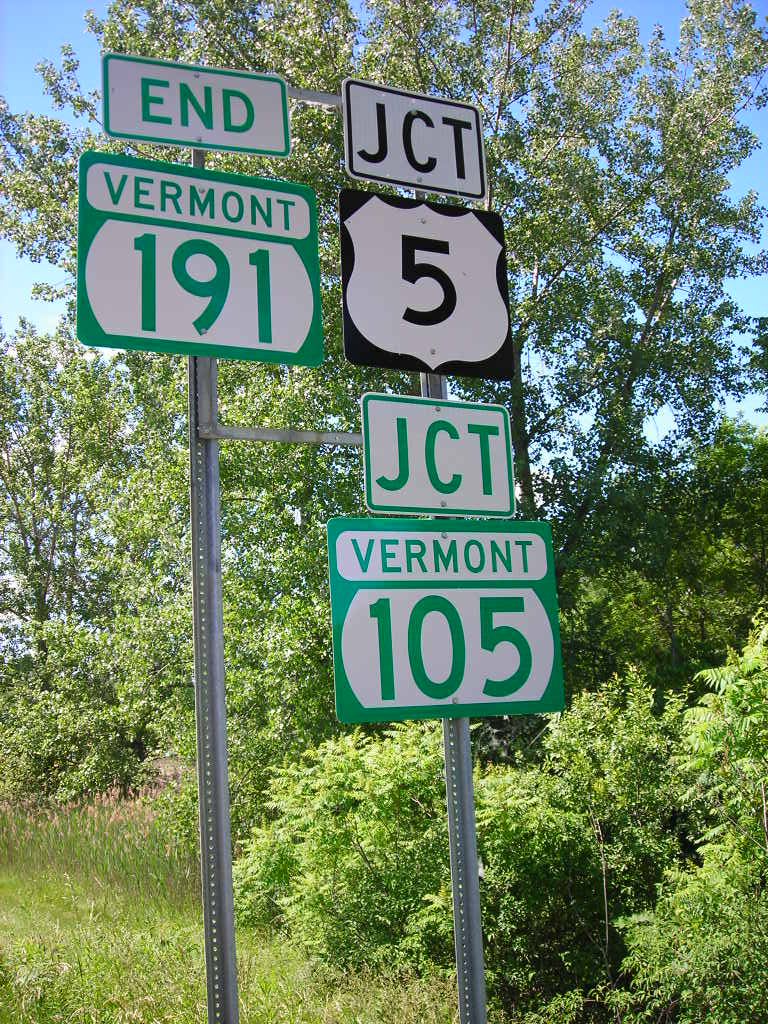
Vermont Route 191 ends in Newport.

== Interstate Highways ==
Number	Length (mi)	Length (km)	Southern or western terminus	Northern or eastern terminus	Formed	Removed	Notes
I-89	130.254	209.623	I-89 at the New Hampshire state line in Hartford	Route 133 at the Canadian border in Highgate	1958	current	Route 133 will be upgraded to a freeway and become A-35, expected completion in 2023
I-91	177.432	285.549	I-91 at the Massachusetts state line in Guilford	A-55 at the Canadian border at Derby Line	1958	current	
I-93	11.104	17.870	I-93 at the New Hampshire state line in Waterford	I-91 in Waterford	1982	current	
I-189	1.488	2.395	US 7 in South Burlington	I-89 in South Burlington	1962	current	
I-289	15.10	24.30	Colchester	Williston	1982	1986	Partially built as VT 289
Former

== U.S. Highways ==
=== Mainline routes ===
Number	Length (mi)	Length (km)	Southern or western terminus	Northern or eastern terminus	Formed	Removed	Notes
US 2	150.518	242.235	US 2 at the New York state line in Alburgh	US 2 at the New Hampshire state line in Guildhall	1926	current	
US 4	66.059	106.312	US 4 at the New York state line in Fair Haven	US 4 at the New Hampshire state line in Hartford	1926	current	Mostly follows the old New England Route 13 in Vermont
US 5	192.317	309.504	US 5 at the Massachusetts state line in Guilford	QC 143 at the Canadian border at Derby Line	1926	current	Mostly follows the old New England Route 2; functionally bypassed by I-91
US 7	176.328	283.772	US 7 at the Massachusetts state line in Pownal	I-89 in Highgate	1926	current	Mostly follows the old New England Route 4
US 302	35.746	57.528	US 2 in Montpelier	US 302 at the New Hampshire state line in Wells River	1935	current	

=== Special routes ===
Number	Length (mi)	Length (km)	Southern or western terminus	Northern or eastern terminus	Formed	Removed	Notes
US 2 Bus.	0.887	1.427	US 2 in Montpelier	US 2 / VT 12 in Montpelier	—	—	Business route in Montpelier
US 4 Bus.	4.371	7.034	US 4 in West Rutland	US 4 / US 7 in city of Rutland	—	—	Business route through Rutland
US 5 Alt.	1.282	2.063	US 5 in St. Johnsbury	US 5 in St. Johnsbury	—	—	Alternate route in St. Johnsbury
US 5 Alt.	0.604	0.972	US 5 in Derby Line	I-91 in Derby Line	—	—	Alternate route in Derby Line
US 5 Alt.	1.283	2.065	US 5 in city of Newport	US 5 in city of Newport	—	—	Alternate route in Newport
US 7 Alt.	2.107	3.391	US 7 in Burlington	US 2 / US 7 in Burlington	—	—	Alternate route in Burlington

== Vermont routes ==
All routes in Vermont are designated by the Vermont Agency of Transportation (VTrans). Most are also owned and maintained by VTrans, but some are partially or wholly owned and maintained by the towns it passes through instead. Routes maintained by VTrans are classified by the agency as "state-maintained highways" and signed using Vermont's green route shields. Routes maintained by the town are classified as "town-maintained routes" and signed using the national circular highway shield.

Five routes in the system have both state- and town-maintained sections. Although maintenance along these routes varies by area, VTrans considers state and town-maintained highways that bear the same signed number as one continuous route.

Designations shaded in gray are no longer active.

=== Numbered state highways ===
Number	Length (mi)	Length (km)	Southern or western terminus	Northern or eastern terminus	Formed	Removed	Notes
VT 2A	13.853	22.294	VT 116 in St. George	US 2 / US 7 in Colchester	—	—	
VT 2B	3.459	5.567	US 2 in Danville	US 2 in St. Johnsbury	—	—	
VT 3	7.828	12.598	US 4 Business in Rutland	US 7 in Pittsford	—	—	
VT 4A	14.174	22.811	US 4 in Fair Haven	US 4 Business in West Rutland	—	—	Former routing of US 4;
VT 5A	19.498	31.379	US 5 in Burke	VT 105 in Charleston	—	—	Mostly follows the old New England Route 2A
VT 7A	27.820	44.772	US 7 in Bennington	US 7 in Dorset	—	—	Follows an old segment of US 7
VT 7B	6.786	10.921	US 7 in Wallingford	US 7 in Clarendon	—	—	
VT 8	13.155	21.171	MA 8 at the Massachusetts state line in Readsboro	VT 9 in Searsburg	—	—	Mostly follows the old New England Route 8
VT 8A	3.300	5.311	MA 8A at the Massachusetts state line in Whitingham	VT 112 in Whitingham	—	—	Entirely town maintained
VT 9	46.959	75.573	NY 7 at the New York line in Bennington	NH 9 at the New Hampshire state line in Brattleboro	—	—	Mostly follows the old New England Route 9
VT 10	4.373	7.038	VT 103 in Chester	VT 106 in Springfield	—	—	
VT 10A	0.522	0.840	I-91 / US 5 in Norwich	NH 10A at the New Hampshire state line in Norwich	—	—	spur route of New Hampshire Route 10; unrelated to Vermont Route 10
VT 11	42.154	67.840	VT 7A in Manchester	NH 11 at the New Hampshire state line in Springfield	—	—	Mostly follows the old New England Route 11
VT 12	101.627	163.553	NH 12 at the New Hampshire state line in Weathersfield	VT 15A / VT 100 in Morrisville	—	—	
VT 12A	20.842	33.542	VT 12 in Randolph	VT 12 in Northfield	—	—	
VT 14	108.946	175.332	US 4 / US 5 in Hartford	VT 100 in Newport	—	—	
VT 15	68.957	110.976	US 2 / US 7 in Winooski	US 2 in Danville	—	—	
VT 15A	1.824	2.935	VT 12 / VT 100 in Morrisville	VT 15 in Morrisville	—	—	
VT 16	27.890	44.885	VT 15 in Hardwick	VT 5A in Westmore	1960	current	Partially town maintained
VT 17	40.409	65.032	NY 185 at the New York state line in Addison	VT 100 in Waitsfield	—	—	
VT 18	7.887	12.693	NH 18 at the New Hampshire state line in Waterford	US 2 in St. Johnsbury	—	—	
VT 19	—	—	VT 30A in Bridport	VT 30 in Middlebury	1935	1953	
VT 22A	44.738	71.999	NY 22A at the New York state line in Fair Haven	US 7 in Ferrisburgh	—	—	spur route of New York Route 22
VT 23	7.370	11.861	VT 125 in Middlebury	VT 17 in Weybridge	—	—	Entirely town maintained
VT 25	17.739	28.548	NH 25 at the New Hampshire state line in Bradford	US 302 in Orange	—	—	
VT 25A	0.088	0.142	US 5 in Fairlee	NH 25A at the New Hampshire state line in Fairlee	—	—	
VT 25B	0.981	1.579	VT 25 in Bradford	US 5 in Bradford	—	—	
VT 26	0.013	0.021	VT 102 in Lemington	NH 26 at the New Hampshire state line in Lemington	—	—	
VT 30	111.870	180.037	US 5 / VT 9 in Brattleboro	US 7 in Middlebury	—	—	
VT 30A	—	—	US 4 / VT 30 in Fair Haven	US 7 in Vergennes	1935	1945	
VT 30B	—	—	NY 149 at the New York state line in Pawlet	VT 30 in Pawlet	1935	1966	
VT 31	5.535	8.908	Washington CR 25 at the New York state line in Wells	VT 30 in Poultney	1966	current	
VT 35	21.220	34.150	VT 30 in Townshend	VT 11 in Chester	—	—	Entirely town maintained
VT 36	29.431	47.365	VT 78 in Swanton	VT 108 in Bakersfield	—	—	Partially town maintained
VT 38	3.864	6.219	US 7 in city of St. Albans	Northwest State Correctional Facility in town of St. Albans	—	—	
VT 44	10.190	16.399	VT 106 in Reading	US 5 in Windsor	—	—	Partially town maintained
VT 44A	2.994	4.818	US 5 in Weathersfield	VT 44 in Windsor	—	—	
VT 53	9.310	14.983	VT 73 in Brandon	US 7 in Salisbury	—	—	Entirely town maintained
VT 56	—	—	US 5 in Barton	VT 5A in Westmore	1955	1986	
VT 58	30.908	49.742	VT 118 in Montgomery	VT 5A in Brownington	1957	current	Partially town maintained
VT 62	4.519	7.273	I-89 in Berlin	US 302 in Barre	—	—	
VT 63	3.901	6.278	I-89 in Berlin	VT 14 in Barre	—	—	
VT 64	6.770	10.895	VT 12 in Northfield	VT 14 in Williamstown	—	—	
VT 65	5.222	8.404	VT 12 in Brookfield	VT 14 in Brookfield	—	—	
VT 66	7.621	12.265	VT 12 in Randolph	VT 14 in Randolph	—	—	
VT 67	4.254	6.846	NY 67 at the New York state line in Shaftsbury	VT 7A in Shaftsbury	—	—	
VT 67A	3.348	5.388	VT 7A in Bennington	VT 67 in Bennington	—	—	
VT 68	—	—	US 2 in Alburgh	QC 104 at the Canadian border in Alburgh	1955	1985	
VT 73	36.674	59.021	VT 74 in Shoreham	VT 100 in Rochester	—	—	Partially town maintained
VT 74	13.263	21.345	Fort Ticonderoga–Larrabees Point Ferry in Shoreham	VT 30 in Cornwall	—	—	
VT 78	21.126	33.999	US 2 in Alburgh	VT 105 in Sheldon	—	—	
VT 100	216.666	348.690	MA 8 at the Massachusetts state line in Stamford	VT 105 in Newport	—	—	
VT 100A	6.971	11.219	VT 100 in Plymouth	US 4 in Bridgewater	—	—	
VT 100B	7.922	12.749	VT 100 in Moretown	US 2 in Middlesex	—	—	
VT 100C	4.595	7.395	VT 15 in Johnson	VT 100 in Hyde Park	—	—	
VT 101	4.333	6.973	VT 100 in Troy	VT 105 in Troy	—	—	
VT 102	43.755	70.417	US 2 in Guildhall	VT 114 / VT 253 in Canaan	—	—	
VT 103	42.036	67.650	US 5 in Rockingham	US 7 in Clarendon	—	—	
VT 103A	—	—	US 7 in Wallingford	VT 103 in Mount Holly	1948	1960	
VT 104	20.503	32.996	VT 15 in Cambridge	VT 105 in St. Albans	—	—	
VT 104A	4.527	7.286	US 7 in Georgia	VT 104 in Fairfax	—	—	
VT 104B	—	—	US 7 / VT 104 in Swanton	VT 105 in Sheldon	1935	1958	
VT 105	98.135	157.933	US 7 in St. Albans	Bridge Street at the New Hampshire state line in Bloomfield	—	—	
VT 105A	1.799	2.895	VT 105 in Richford	Chemin de la Vallée-Missisquoi at the Canadian border in Richford	—	—	
VT 106	25.963	41.783	VT 11 in Springfield	US 4 in Woodstock	—	—	
VT 107	13.503	21.731	VT 100 in Stockbridge	VT 14 in Royalton	—	—	
VT 108	45.450	73.145	VT 100 in Stowe	QC 237 at the Canadian border in Berkshire	—	—	
VT 109	14.800	23.818	VT 108 in Cambridge	VT 118 in Belvidere	—	—	
VT 110	27.136	43.671	VT 14 in Royalton	US 302 in Barre	—	—	
VT 111	15.137	24.361	VT 105 in Derby	VT 114 in Brighton	—	—	
VT 112	—	—	US 7 in Pownal	NY 346 at the New York state line in Pownal	1926	c. 1939	renumbered VT 346 to match New York counterpart
VT 112	7.450	11.990	MA 112 at the Massachusetts state line in Halifax	VT 100 in Whitingham	1947	current	
VT 113	22.847	36.769	VT 110 in Chelsea	East Thetford Road at the New Hampshire state line in Thetford	—	—	
VT 113A	—	—	VT 113 in Thetford	East Thetford Road at the New Hampshire state line in Thetford	1935	1975	
VT 114	53.094	85.447	US 5 / VT 122 in Lyndon	Main Street at the New Hampshire state line in Canaan	—	—	
VT 115	—	—	US 7 in Brandon	VT 100 in Rochester	1938	1967	
VT 116	40.759	65.595	US 7 in Middlebury	US 2 in South Burlington	—	—	
VT 116A	—	—	VT 116 in St. George	US 2 in Williston	1948	1973	
VT 117	8.072	12.991	VT 2A / VT 15 in Essex Junction	US 2 in Richmond	—	—	Partially town maintained
VT 118	28.549	45.945	VT 100 in Eden	VT 108 in Berkshire	—	—	Partially town maintained
VT 119	0.080	0.129	US 5 / VT 142 in Brattleboro	NH 119 at the New Hampshire state line in Brattleboro	—	—	
VT 120	10.554	16.985	VT 105 in Sheldon	VT 108 in Berkshire	—	—	
VT 121	21.439	34.503	VT 11 in Londonderry	US 5 in Bellows Falls	—	—	Entirely town maintained
VT 122	15.215	24.486	US 5 / VT 114 in Lyndon	VT 16 in Glover	—	—	
VT 123	0.313	0.504	US 5 in Westminster	NH 123 at the New Hampshire state line in Westminster	—	—	
VT 125	35.901	57.777	VT 17 in Addison	VT 100 in Hancock	—	—	
VT 127	9.940	15.997	Pearl Street in Burlington	US 2 / US 7 in Colchester	—	—	Main section, which is entirely town maintained; 0.142-mile-long (0.229 km) other section is state maintained
VT 128	11.616	18.694	VT 15 in Essex	VT 104 in Fairfax	—	—	
VT 129	5.415	8.715	School Street / Church Street in Isle La Motte	US 2 in Alburgh	—	—	Partially town maintained
VT 130	—	—	MA 112 at the Massachusetts state line in Halifax	VT 8 in Whitingham	1935	1947	
VT 131	16.299	26.231	VT 103 in Cavendish	US 5 in Weathersfield	—	—	
VT 132	16.877	27.161	VT 14 in Sharon	US 5 in Norwich	—	—	Partially town maintained
VT 133	22.476	36.172	VT 30 in Pawlet	VT 4A in West Rutland	1960	current	
VT 139	1.822	2.932	VT 105 in Richford	QC 139 at the Canadian border in Richford	—	—	Entirely town maintained
VT 140	25.059	40.329	VT 30 in Poultney	VT 103 in Mount Holly	—	—	Partially town maintained
VT 141	0.493	0.793	VT 114 in Canaan	QC 141 at the Canadian border in Canaan	1960	current	
VT 142	10.847	17.457	MA 142 at the Massachusetts state line in Vernon	US 5 / VT 119 in Brattleboro	—	—	
VT 143	5.750	9.254	VT 11 in Springfield	US 5 in Springfield	1961	current	Entirely town maintained
VT 144	6.910	11.121	VT 22A in Benson	VT 30 in Sudbury	—	—	Entirely town maintained
VT 147	0.145	0.233	VT 114 in Norton	QC 147 at the Canadian border in Norton	—	—	
VT 149	1.302	2.095	NY 149 at the New York state line in Pawlet	VT 30 in Pawlet	1966	current	
VT 153	13.140	21.147	Washington CR 153 at the New York state line in Rupert	VT 30 in Pawlet	1961	current	Entirely town maintained
VT 155	10.377	16.700	VT 100 in Weston	VT 103 in Wallingford	1961	current	
VT 191	2.290	3.685	I-91 in Derby	US 5 / VT 105 in Newport	—	—	
VT 207	13.821	22.243	US 7 in St. Albans	VT 235 in Franklin	—	—	Partially town maintained
VT 214	2.061	3.317	US 2 in Plainfield	VT 14 in East Montpelier	—	—	
VT 215	9.160	14.742	US 2 in Marshfield	VT 15 in Walden	—	—	Entirely town maintained
VT 225	1.590	2.559	US 2 in Alburgh	QC 225 at the Canadian border in Alburgh	—	—	Entirely town maintained
VT 232	13.548	21.803	US 302 in Groton	US 2 in Marshfield	—	—	
VT 235	4.640	7.467	VT 120 in Franklin	QC 235 at the Canadian border in Franklin	—	—	Entirely town maintained
VT 236	6.169	9.928	VT 105 in Sheldon	VT 120 in Franklin	—	—	
VT 242	12.878	20.725	VT 118 in Montgomery	VT 101 in Troy	—	—	
VT 243	1.181	1.901	QC 243 at the Canadian border in North Troy	VT 105 in North Troy	—	—	
VT 244	5.640	9.077	VT 113 in Thetford	US 5 in Fairlee	—	—	
VT 253	2.159	3.475	VT 102 / VT 114 in Canaan	QC 253 at the Canadian border in Canaan	—	—	
VT 279	6.054	9.743	NY 915G at the New York state line in Bennington	VT 9 in Bennington	2004	current	
VT 289	3.940	6.341	VT 2A in Essex	VT 117 in Essex	—	—	
VT 313	10.050	16.174	NY 313 at the New York state line in Arlington	US 7 in Sunderland	—	—	
VT 314	5.493	8.840	US 2 in South Hero	US 2 in Grand Isle	1964	current	
VT 315	5.830	9.382	VT 153 in Rupert	VT 30 in Rupert	—	—	Entirely town maintained
VT 346	4.628	7.448	US 7 in Pownal	NY 346 at the New York state line in Pownal	c. 1939	current	
Former

=== Ferry roads ===
Number	Length (mi)	Length (km)	Southern or western terminus	Northern or eastern terminus	Formed	Removed	Notes
VT F-1	—	—	—	—	—	—	Replaced by US 2
VT F-2	—	—	—	—	c. 1935	c. 1942	Replaced by VT 129
VT F-3	—	—	—	—	c. 1935	1964	Replaced by VT 314
VT F-4	—	—	—	—	—	—	Unassigned
VT F-5	2.890	4.651	Charlotte–Essex ferry in Charlotte	US 7 in Charlotte	c. 1928	current	
VT F-6	—	—	—	—	c. 1930	c. 1935	Followed Panton Road
VT F-7	—	—	—	—	c. 1927	c. 1930	Replaced by VT 17
VT F-8	—	—	—	—	c. 1926	c. 1935	Replaced by VT 125
VT F-9	—	—	—	—	c. 1927	1954	Replaced by VT 74
VT F-9A	—	—	—	—	c. 1930	1954	
VT F-10	—	—	—	—	c. 1930	1954	Replaced by VT 73
VT F-10A	—	—	—	—	c. 1930	1931	
Former

=== Named state highways ===
These roads are maintained by the state but are not assigned signed route numbers. The majority of them are minor connectors between two signed routes, making them similar to New York's reference routes. Unless a town is indicated in the southern or western terminus column, each highway is entirely within the town listed in the northern or eastern Terminus column.

Number	Length (mi)	Length (km)	Southern or western terminus	Northern or eastern terminus	Local names	Formed	Removed	Notes
VT 9020	0.806	1.297	West Barnet Road	US 5 in Barnet	Barnet State Highway	—	—	I-91 exit 18
VT 9025	0.236	0.380	VT 7A	US 7 in Bennington	Bennington North State Highway	—	—	US 7 exit 2
VT 9030	2.414	3.885	Edward F. Knapp State Airport	US 302 in Berlin	Berlin State Highway	—	—	Includes Airport Road, 0.134-mile-long (0.216 km) concurrency with VT 62, and ramps from VT 62 to US 302
VT 9090	0.135	0.217	I-91	US 5 / VT 9 in Brattleboro	Brattleboro State Highway	—	—	I-91 exit 3
VT 9150	0.398	0.641	VT 4A	East Hubbardton Road in Castleton	Castleton State Highway	—	—	US 4 exit 5
VT 9160	0.914	1.471	Rutland–Southern Vermont Regional Airport	VT 103 in Clarendon	Clarendon State Highway	—	—	Airport Road
VT 9180	2.630	4.233	Newport State Airport in Coventry	US 5 in Newport	Coventry State Highway	—	—	Airport Road
VT 9210	0.598	0.962	VT 4A	Scotch Hill Road in Fair Haven	Fair Haven State Highway	—	—	US 4 exit 3
VT 9240	0.197	0.317	US 5	Lake Morey Road in Fairlee	Fairlee State Highway	—	—	I-91 exit 15
VT 9270	0.799	1.286	VT 22A in Vergennes	US 7 in Ferrisburgh	Ferrisburgh State Highway	—	—	Green Street and New Haven Road
VT 9330	0.602	0.969	VT 102	Maidstone Bridge at Connecticut River in Maidstone	Maidstone State Highway	—	—	Lamoreaux Road; leads to US 3 in Stratford, NH
VT 9360	0.170	0.274	US 2	Center Road in Middlesex	Middlesex State Highway	—	—	I-89 exit 9
VT 9390	0.890	1.432	I-89	US 2 in Montpelier	Montpelier State Highway	—	—	I-89 exit 8; Memorial Drive
VT 9420	0.757	1.218	Montpelier State Highway in Montpelier	Dog River Road at Montpelier–Berlin town line	Montpelier Junction State Highway	—	—	Intersects Montpelier Junction Road, which leads to Montpelier Amtrak station
VT 9430	0.482	0.776	US 5	Newbury Crossing at Connecticut River in Newbury	Newbury State Highway	—	—	Newbury Crossing Road; leads to NH 10 in Haverhill, NH
VT 9480	0.573	0.922	VT 114	VT 114 in Norton	Norton State Highway	—	—	Lake View Road; loop between two intersections with VT 114
VT 9540	1.150	1.851	VT 10A	US 5 in Norwich	Norwich State Highway	—	—	River Road
VT 9600	0.289	0.465	Putney Landing Road	US 5 in Putney	Putney State Highway	—	—	I-91 exit 4
VT 9630	0.123	0.198	US 4	Stagecoach Road in Hartford	Quechee State Highway	—	—	I-89 exit 1
VT 9720	1.049	1.688	US 7 in city of St. Albans	I-89 in town of St. Albans	St. Albans State Highway	—	—	I-89 exit 19; includes intersection with VT 104
VT 9730	1.019	1.640	US 5	I-91 in St. Johnsbury	St. Johnsbury State Highway	—	—	I-91 exit 22; Hospital Drive
VT 9840	0.770	1.239	I-91	US 5 in Westminster	Westminster State Highway	—	—	I-91 exit 5; Westminster Street
VT 9870	0.744	1.197	Christian Street	US 5 in Hartford	Wilder State Highway	—	—	I-91 exit 12; Bugbee Street
VT 9900	0.402	0.647	Barnumville Road / New Ireland Road	VT 11 / VT 30 in Winhall	Winhall State Highway	—	—	Tollgate Road
