= Vermont Route 207 =

State highway in Franklin County, Vermont, US

Vermont Route 207
- VT 207 highlighted in red

Route information
- Maintained by VTrans and Towns of Highgate and Franklin
- Length: 13.821 mi (22.243 km)

Major junctions
- South end: US 7 in St. Albans
- I-89 in St. Albans
- North end: VT 235 in Franklin

Location
- Country: United States
- State: Vermont
- Counties: Franklin

Highway system
- State highways in Vermont
← VT 191	→ VT 214

Vermont Route 207 (VT 207) is a 13.821-mile-long (22.243 km) north–south state highway in Franklin County, Vermont, United States. It begins in the town of St. Albans at U.S. Route 7 (US 7) and runs north to the small village of Morses Line within the town of Franklin, where it intersects VT 235, approximately 0.5 miles (0.8 km) south of the Canada–US border. North of VT 78, the route is town-maintained and internally designated as major collector 297.

== Route description ==
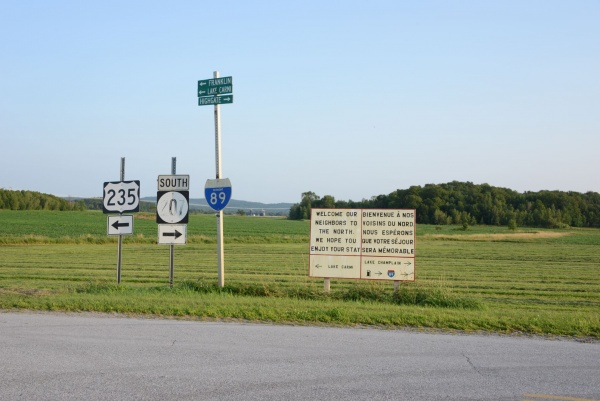
Northern end of route 207, near Morses Line Border Crossing.

Route 207 begins at an intersection with U.S. Route 7 north of St. Albans. It starts its journey north by immediately interchanging with Interstate 89 at Exit 20. It continues to roughly parallel the Interstate before turning northeast and crossing into the town of Highgate, where it meets and briefly overlaps with Route 78. Route 207 continues north out of Highgate into the extreme northern reaches of the state. About 0.5-mile (0.80 km) south of the Canada–US border, Route 207 cuts to the east into the small village of Morses Line, where it ends at Route 235. Route 235 continues north into Quebec, where it becomes Quebec Route 235.

== Major intersections ==
The entire route is in Franklin County.

Location	mi	km	Destinations	Notes
Town of St. Albans	0.000	0.000	US 7 – St. Albans, Swanton	Southern terminus
Town of St. Albans	0.215– 0.313	0.346– 0.504	I-89 – Swanton, Montreal, Burlington	Exit 20 (I-89); diamond interchange
Highgate	7.199	11.586	VT 78 west – Swanton	Southern end of concurrency with VT 78
Highgate	7.461	12.007	VT 78 east	Northern end of concurrency with VT 78
Franklin	13.821	22.243	VT 235 – Canada border	Northern terminus; Village of Morses Line
1.000 mi = 1.609 km; 1.000 km = 0.621 mi: Concurrency terminus
