= Highgate Center, Vermont =

Census-designated place in Vermont, United States

- Census-designated place
- Location within Vermont Location within the United States
- Coordinates: 44°56′15″N 73°02′31″W
- Country: United States
- State: Vermont
- County: Franklin
- Town: Highgate

Area
  - Total: 0.69 sq mi (1.79 km^{2})
  - Land: 0.66 sq mi (1.72 km^{2})
  - Water: 0.027 sq mi (0.07 km^{2})
- Elevation: 308 ft (94 m)

Population (2020)
  - Total: 361
- Time zone: UTC-5 (Eastern (EST))
  - Summer (DST): UTC-4 (EDT)
- ZIP Code: 05459
- Area code: 802
- FIPS code: 50-33175
- GNIS feature ID: 2586638

Highgate Center is the primary village and a census-designated place (CDP) in the town of Highgate, Franklin County, Vermont, United States. As of the 2020 census it had a population of 361, out of 3,472 in the entire town of Highgate.

== Geography ==
The CDP is in northwestern Franklin County, in the south-central part of the town of Highgate. It sits on the north side of the Missisquoi River, a west-flowing tributary of Lake Champlain, where the river passes over Highgate Falls. Vermont Route 78 (Franklin Street) passes through the center of the village, leading southeast 6 miles (10 km) to Vermont Route 105 at Sheldon Junction and southwest 4 miles (6 km) to Swanton. Vermont Route 207 also passes through the village, leading south 9 miles (14 km) to St. Albans and northeast 6 miles (10 km) to the Canadian border at Morses Line.

== Education ==
It is in the Franklin Northwest Supervisory Union school district.
