= Vermont Route 120 =

State highway in Franklin County, Vermont, US

Vermont Route 120
- VT 120 highlighted in red

Route information
- Maintained by VTrans
- Length: 10.554 mi (16.985 km)
- Existed: 1961–present

Major junctions
- South end: VT 105 in Sheldon
- North end: VT 108 in Berkshire

Location
- Country: United States
- State: Vermont
- Counties: Franklin

Highway system
- State highways in Vermont
← VT 119	→ VT 121

Vermont Route 120 (VT 120) is a 10.554-mile-long (16.985 km) state highway located in Franklin County, Vermont, United States. The route begins at an intersection with VT 105 in the town of Sheldon, beginning as a north–south route until the junction with VT 235. At that junction, the route begins a west–east progression, reaching a junction with VT 108 in the town of Berkshire. The route was designated as a decision of the Vermont State Legislature in 1961.

== Route description ==
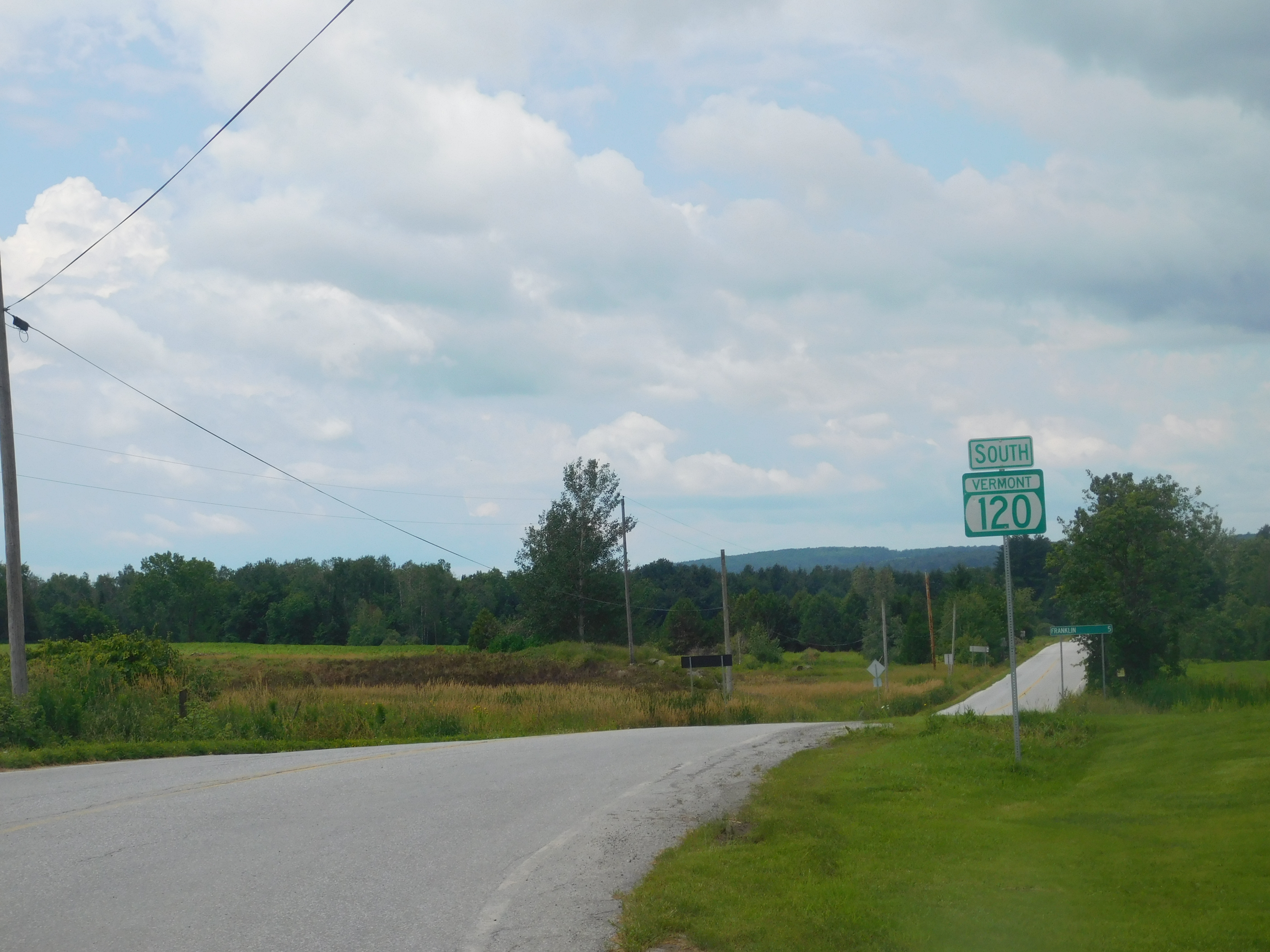
VT 120 in Berkshire

VT 120 begins at an intersection with VT 105 in the town of Sheldon as a state-maintained continuation of nearby Kane Road. VT 120 runs north from the banks of the Missisquoi River into the small hamlet of North Sheldon. Very little defines North Sheldon, which the route leaves almost immediately as it bends northwest at Skunks Misery Road. VT 120 passes a nearby junction with Swamp Road, which connects the route to Lake Carmi State Park via nearby VT 236. VT 120 runs north–northwest through Sheldon, soon reaching the town line of Franklin. Known for a short time as North Sheldon Road, the route passes well west of Lake Carmi, and soon changes monikers to Main Street as it enters the center of Franklin. Through Franklin, VT 120 is the main northwest–southeast thoroughfare, soon reaching a junction with the eastern terminus of VT 235 (Morses Line Road), which connects to QC 235 at the Morses Line Border Crossing.

VT 120 turns east at the junction with VT 235, changing names to Lake Road, running east through the fields of Franklin near the Canada–United States border. After Riley Road, the route bends northeast and soon reaches the northern shore of Lake Camri. At Dewing Road, the route passes Mill Pond, a runoff of the lake before leaving both entirely as it reaches a junction with the northern terminus of VT 236 (State Park Road). The two routes merge, as VT 120 enters the town of Berkshire. In Berkshire, VT 120 jogs northeast and then turns east at a junction with Boston Post Road. Running through the hamlet of East Berkshire, the route reaches a junction with VT 108. This junction marks the eastern terminus of VT 120, just south of where VT 108 crosses the border.

== History ==
VT 120 was first designated for its entire length in 1961 by an act of the Vermont State Legislature.

== Major intersections ==
The entire route is in Franklin County.

Location	mi	km	Destinations	Notes
Sheldon	0.000	0.000	VT 105 – Enosburg Falls, Richford, Sheldon, St. Albans	Southern terminus
Franklin	5.517	8.879	VT 235 north (Morses Line Road)	Southern terminus of VT 235
Franklin	9.938	15.994	VT 236 south (State Park Road)	Northern terminus of VT 236
Berkshire	10.554	16.985	VT 108 – Canada, Enosburg Falls	Northern terminus
1.000 mi = 1.609 km; 1.000 km = 0.621 mi
