= Swanton, Vermont =

Swanton, Vermont may refer to:

- Swanton (town), Vermont
- Swanton (village), Vermont, located within the above town
