= Vermont Route 78 =

State highway in northwestern Vermont, US

Vermont Route 78
- VT 78 highlighted in red

Route information
- Maintained by VTrans
- Length: 21.126 mi (33.999 km)

Major junctions
- West end: US 2 in Alburgh
- I-89 in Swanton
- East end: VT 105 in Sheldon

Location
- Country: United States
- State: Vermont
- Counties: Grand Isle, Franklin

Highway system
- State highways in Vermont
← VT 74	→ I-89
← VT 104A	→ VT 105

Vermont Route 78 (VT 78) is a 21.126-mile-long (33.999 km) east–west state highway in northwestern Vermont, United States. It begins at U.S. Route 2 (US 2) in Alburgh near the New York and Canada–US borders, and runs southeast to VT 105 in Sheldon. It is one of two routes connecting the Vermont mainland to the Grand Isle area of Lake Champlain, the other being US 2 north of Burlington.

== Route description ==
VT 78 begins at an intersection with U.S. Route 2 in Alburgh. It crosses Lake Champlain onto the mainland, and proceeds southeast into the village of Swanton. Upon entering the town, VT 78 intersects the western terminus of VT 36. The route crosses the Missisquoi River and immediately intersects U.S. Route 7. The two routes overlap very briefly, then VT 78 heads east through the village to an interchange with Interstate 89 at exit 21, just east of the village line in the town of Swanton. VT 78 continues northeast into the town of Highgate, meeting and briefly overlapping VT 207. VT 78 then continues southeast to its terminus at VT 105 in Sheldon.

== Major intersections ==
County	Location	mi	km	Destinations	Notes
Grand Isle	Alburgh	0.000	0.000	US 2 to US 11	Western terminus
Franklin	Village of Swanton	9.847	15.847	VT 36 east (South River Street)	Western terminus of VT 36
Franklin	Village of Swanton	10.081	16.224	US 7 north – Highgate Springs, Canada	Western end of concurrency with US 7
Franklin	Village of Swanton	10.163	16.356	US 7 south – St. Albans, Burlington	Eastern end of concurrency with US 7
Franklin	Town of Swanton	10.987– 11.092	17.682– 17.851	I-89 – St. Albans, Burlington, Canada–US border, Montreal	Exit 21 on I-89; diamond interchange
Franklin	Highgate	14.426	23.216	VT 207 south (Highgate Road)	Western end of concurrency with VT 207
Franklin	Highgate	14.688	23.638	VT 207 north (Gore Road) to VT 235 – Morse Line, Canada	Eastern end of concurrency with VT 207
Franklin	Sheldon	21.126	33.999	VT 105 – North Sheldon, Enosburg Falls, Sheldon Springs, St. Albans	Eastern terminus
1.000 mi = 1.609 km; 1.000 km = 0.621 mi: Concurrency terminus
