= Vermont Route 105 =

State highway in northern Vermont, United States

Vermont Route 105
- Pearl Harbor Memorial Highway
- VT 105 highlighted in red

Route information
- Maintained by VTrans
- Length: 98.135 mi (157.933 km)

Major junctions
- West end: US 7 in St. Albans
- VT 100 in Town of Newport; US 5 in City of Newport; I-91 in Derby
- East end: US 3 in North Stratford, NH

Location
- Country: United States
- State: Vermont
- Counties: Franklin, Orleans, Essex

Highway system
- State highways in Vermont
← VT 104B	→ VT 106

Vermont Route 105 (VT 105) is a 98.135-mile-long (157.933 km) state highway in northern Vermont in the United States. The route runs from U.S. Route 7 (US 7) in St. Albans in the west to the New Hampshire state line in Bloomfield in the east. The road continues across the state line as Bridge Street, a short unnumbered New Hampshire state route to US 3 in North Stratford, New Hampshire. As it is not a New Hampshire state highway, the connection is signed with Vermont state highway signage, similar to how connections to Vermont state routes are indicated elsewhere in New Hampshire.

Moose are most often encountered on four roads in Vermont, of which this is one. They are seen from Island Pond to Bloomfield.

== Route description ==
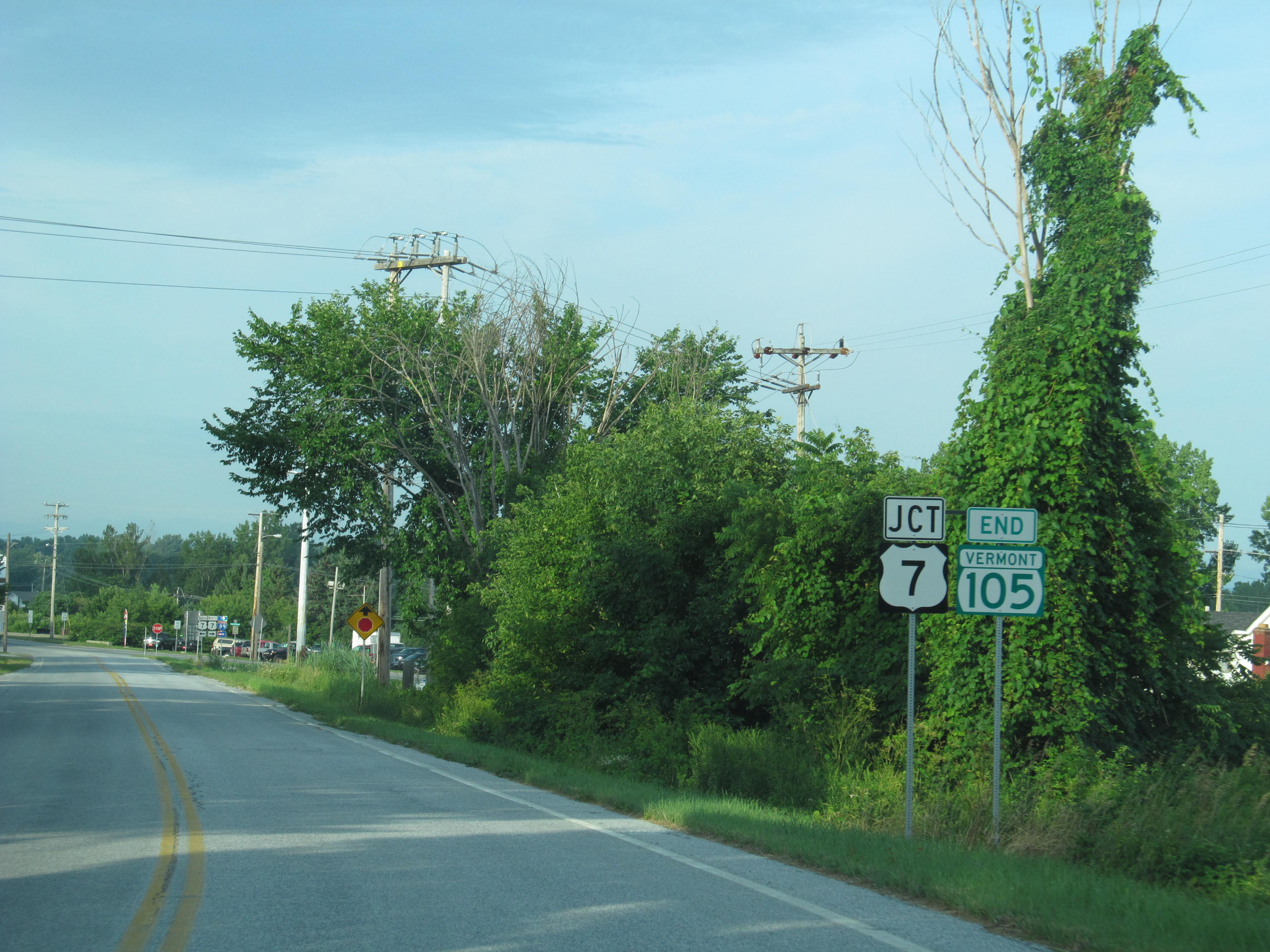
VT 105 approaching US 7 in St. Albans

=== St. Albans to North Troy ===
VT 105 begins at a fork from US 7 (Swanton Road) in the Franklin County city of St. Albans. VT 105 runs northeast along Sheldon Road, a two-lane road paralleling nearby railroad tracks. The route turns east and merges into Seymour Road, which changes names to Sheldon. Running along the northern side of St. Albans, becoming a two-lane rural road in the town of St. Albans. After a straight stretch of eastbound roadway, VT 105 crosses under, but does not intersect with Interstate 89. Now running northeast, VT 105 reaches a junction with the northern terminus of VT 104 (Fisher Pond Road).

At this junction, VT 105 turns further to the northeast, retaining the Sheldon Road moniker as it crosses through rural St. Albans. Entering the town of Swanton, the route remains rural, crossing railroad tracks. The route soon crosses into the rural hamlet of Greens Corners, crossing into the town of Sheldon. At the junction with Bedard Road, VT 105 enters a small residential area in town, running north to the intersection with Woods Hill Road. At Woods Hill Road, VT 105 turns northeast again, crossing through woods and fields in Sheldon. VT 105 turns eastward, then bends southeast into the hamlet of Sheldon Springs.

Crossing through Sheldon Springs, VT 105 crosses railroad tracks, paralleling with nearby Mill Street, which merges back in. The route runs southeast out of Sheldon Springs, paralleling the tracks, and crossing Missisquoi River. VT 105 reaches the hamlet of Sheldon Junction and an intersection with the eastern end of VT 78. Crossing through Sheldon Junction, the route makes a curve to the northeast again, paralleling the Missisquoi River. VT 105 becomes a rural roadway again, continuing near the river into a junction with VT 120 (Kane Road). VT 105 continues northeast along the riverside before beginning an eastbound wind through Sheldon. Passing an intersection with VT 236 (State Park Road).

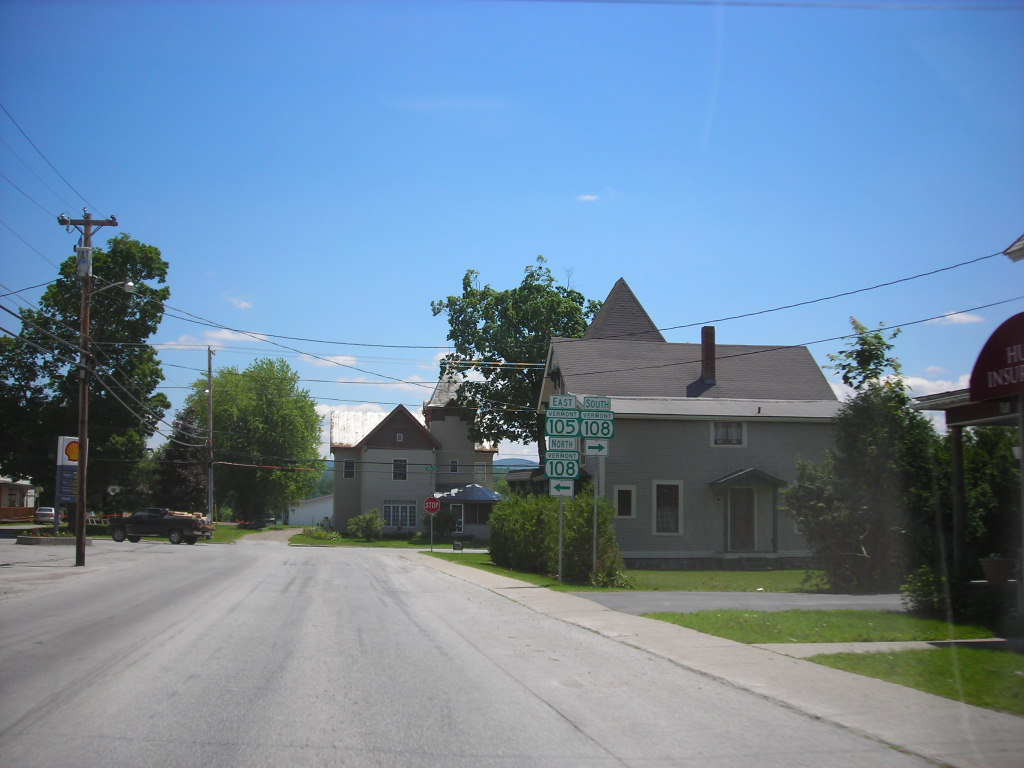
VT 105 approaching VT 108 in Enosburg Falls

VT 105 soon crosses into Enosburg Falls runs southeast into the village, being main west–east road through the community. Soon, the route meets a junction with VT 108 (Main Street), which becomes concurrent at the junction with VT 105 turning northeast along Main Street. Now the main north–south road through Enosburg Falls, passing commercial roads through the city. VT 108 and VT 105 continue northeast until the junction with West Berkshire Road, where VT 108 turns off to the northwest and VT 105 turns northeast on Sampsonville Road. VT 105 soon leaves Enosburg Falls, entering the town of Enosburg.

Retaining the name Sampsonville Road, VT 105 winds east along the river, reaching the hamlet of Sampsonville. Changing names to East Berkshire Road, crossing into the town of Berkshire and junction with VT 118 (Berkshire Center Road). VT 118 and VT 105 are concurrent for a short stretch, reaching Montgomery Road, where VT 118 turns off. The route bends north as East Berkshire Road, continuing through the town of Berkshire. Continuing along the riverside, VT 105 soon enters the town of Richford, where it is a two-lane residential street. At the junction with Troy Street, VT 139 begins as Main Street, while VT 105 turns off on Troy.

VT 105 runs southeast through Richford, paralleling the riverside out of the hamlet as Jay Road. Fast approaching the Canada–United States border, the route turns northeast and into a junction with VT 105A (Glen-Sutton Road). VT 105A runs northeast to border while VT 105 runs through dense woods in Richford. Making a huge curve to the southeast, the route parallels the border, crossing into Orleans County. Now in the town of Jay, the route bends southeast and then makes a curve to the northeast, along some mountainsides in town. The dense woods start to break up as VT 105 reaches a junction with VT 101.

=== North Troy to New Hampshire ===
VT 101 ends at the junction as VT 105 takes over the right-of-way, running north into village of North Troy. In North Troy, VT 105 turns eastward along North Pleasant Street after a junction with VT 243, which runs to the Quebec border and Route 243. Running along North Pleasant, VT 105 crosses the east branch of the Missisquoi River, changing names to East Main, and turning southeast along a parallel of nearby railroad tracks. The tracks soon divert to the northeast as VT 105 returns to the town of Troy, running southeast through the rural town and turning east once again.

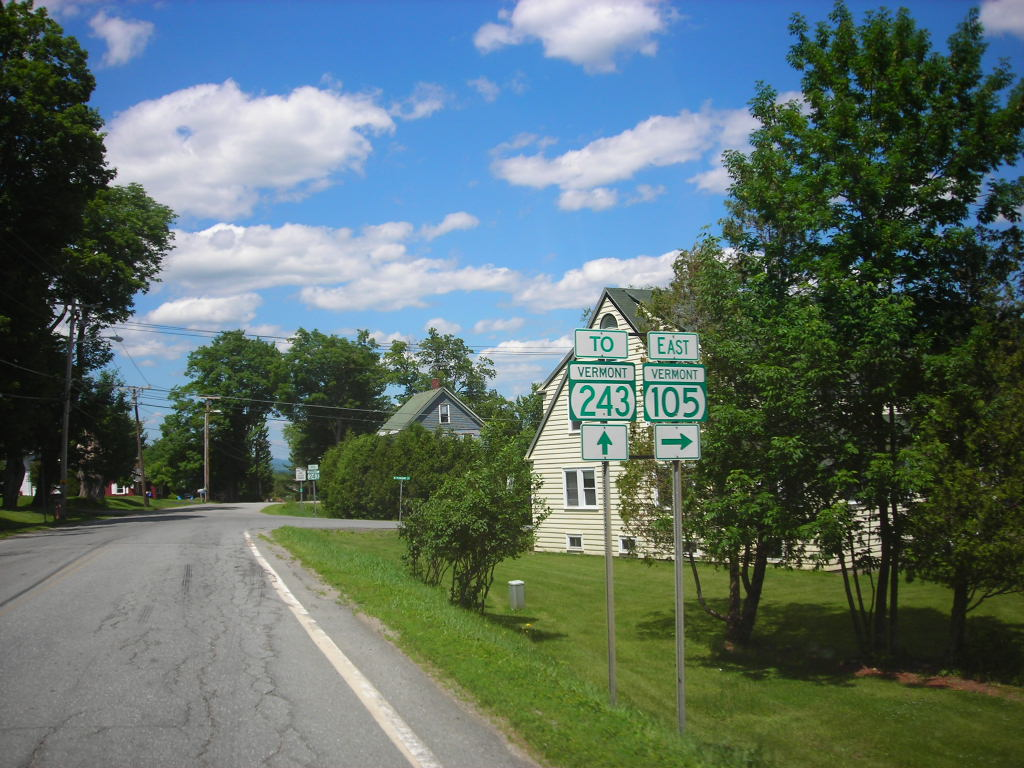
VT 105 eastbound approaching VT 243

After crossing the railroad tracks again, VT 105 crosses into the town of Newport, paralleling a nearby creek. The route enters the hamlet of Newport, where it is the main northwest–southeast street through the community as a two-lane residential road. VT 105 soon leaves the hamlet, remaining in the town of Newport. Continuing southeast, the route reaches the northern terminus of VT 100, which trades its right-of-way to VT 105, running northeast. The route bends east, crossing into the town of Coventry. North of Walker Pond, the route bends northeast and turns east into the city of Newport.

Now named Highland Avenue, VT 105 runs eastward along the hills around Newport, reaching a junction with US 5 (Pleasant Street). VT 105 and US 5 become concurrent along Pleasant Street, becoming the main street in the city. A block later, the route turns north on Third Street, heading toward Lake Memphremagog. Two blocks north of Pleasant Street, it turns east onto Main Street, paralleling the shoreline of the lake. At Railroad Square, VT 105 and US 5 turn north and crosses the lake. On the other side of the lake, the route parallels the Clyde River, reaching a junction with the western terminus of VT 191.

Now known as Union Street, VT 105 and US 5 turn east onto East Main Street, paralleling north of VT 191. After the junction with Western Avenue, the route continues along East Main, passing north of Clyde Pond. Now in the town of Derby, it turns northeast and away from VT 191, entering an interchange with I-91 (exit 28). VT 105 and US 5 enter Derby Center as the main west–east street. At the eastern end of the community VT 105 turns south on the same right-of-way. At this junction, VT 5A becomes concurrent with VT 105, which south through the southern edges of Derby Center, intersecting with the western end of VT 111.

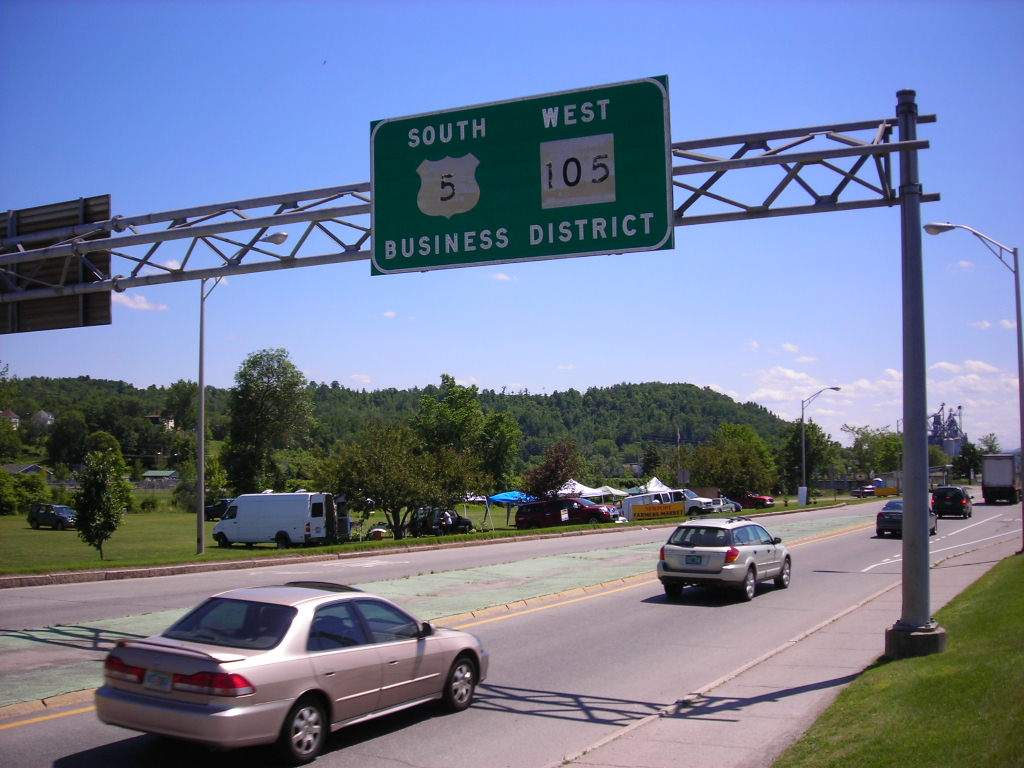
VT 105 and US 5 approaching downtown Newport

VT 105 and VT 5A run southeast out of Derby Center and into the town of Derby, paralleling Lake Salem, which soon becomes another portion of the Clyde River. VT 105 and VT 5A continue along the Clyde, crossing into the town of Charleston. Now known as East Charleston Road, bending eastward into the hamlet of West Charleston. The route bends southward past Charleston Pond, where VT 5A forks to the southwest. Paralleling the Clyde River, reaching Pensioner Pond, which is surrounded by both routes on each shore, VT 105 turns further to the southeast, passing through the hamlet of East Charleston.

Crossing the Pherrins River, VT 105 crosses into Essex County and the town of Brighton. Paralleling the Pherrins River, VT 105 continues southeast into a junction with VT 114 (East Haven Road). VT 105 and VT 114 run northeast through Brighton, reaching the hamlet of Island Pond. Now known as Derby Street, the routes reach the namesake pond, turning north onto Cross Street. One block north on Cross, VT VT 105 turns east onto East Brighton Road. Paralleling railroad tracks and Island Pond, VT 105 runs southeast, leaving Island Pond hamlet for Brighton State Park.

The route continues southeast through woods, passing the John H. Boylan State Airport as it turns eastward, passing Nulhegan Pond. Now paralleling the Nulhegan River, VT 105 enters the unorganized town of Ferdinand, crossing through the hamlet of East Brighton. Continuing along the railroad tracks, VT 105 makes a long bend southeast and turns northeast again up a mountainside. Running along a mountainside, the route runs east paralleling the Nulhegan River, making a large bend southward into the town of Brunswick and soon into the village of Bloomfield. In Bloomfield, VT 105 runs northwest–southeast, crossing a junction with VT 102. After VT 102, VT 105 crosses the Connecticut River and enters the state of New Hampshire, marking the eastern end of VT 105. After the bridge, Bridge Street runs east for two blocks to a junction with US 3.

== Major intersections ==
County	Location	mi	km	Destinations	Notes
Franklin	City of St. Albans	0.000	0.000	US 7 (Swanton Road) to I-89 – Swanton, Canada	Western terminus
Franklin	Town of St. Albans	1.448	2.330	VT 104 south (Fisher Pond Road) – North Fairfax, Fairfax	Northern terminus of VT 104
Franklin	Sheldon	10.276	16.538	VT 78 west – East Highgate, Swanton	Eastern terminus of VT 78
Franklin	Sheldon	12.564	20.220	VT 120 north (Kane Road) – Franklin	Eastern terminus of VT 120
Franklin	Sheldon	14.589	23.479	VT 236 north (State Park Road) – East Franklin	Northern terminus of VT 236
Franklin	Enosburg Falls	17.567	28.271	VT 108 south (Main Street) – Bakersfield, Jeffersonville	Western end of concurrency with VT 108
Franklin	Enosburg Falls	18.071	29.082	VT 108 north (West Berkshire Road) – West Berkshire	Eastern end of concurrency with VT 108
Franklin	Berkshire	22.995	37.007	VT 118 north (Berkshire Center Road) – Berkshire	Western end of concurrency with VT 118
Franklin	Berkshire	23.085	37.152	VT 118 south (Montgomery Road) – Montgomery	Eastern end of concurrency with VT 118
Franklin	Richford	27.619	44.448	VT 139 north (Main Street)	Southern terminus of VT 139
Franklin	Richford	31.181	50.181	VT 105A north (Glen–Sutton Road) – East Richford, Canada	Southern terminus of VT 105A
Orleans	Troy	43.764	70.431	VT 101 south – Troy	Northern terminus of VT 101
Orleans	North Troy	46.105	74.199	VT 243 north (Elm Street) – Canada	Southern terminus of VT 243
Orleans	Town of Newport	53.937	86.803	VT 100 south – Troy	Northern terminus of VT 100
Orleans	City of Newport	57.798	93.017	US 5 south (Pleasant Street) – St. Johnsbury, Barton, Orleans	Western end of concurrency with US 5
Orleans	City of Newport	58.425	94.026	US 5 Alt. south (Coventry Street)	Northern terminus of US 5 Truck
Orleans	City of Newport	58.897	94.786	VT 191 south to I-91	Northern terminus of VT 191
Orleans	Derby	61.698– 61.915	99.293– 99.643	I-91 – St. Johnsbury, Sherbrooke	Exit 28 on I-91
Orleans	Derby	62.802	101.070	US 5 north – Derby Line VT 5A south	Eastern end of concurrency with US 5 Northern terminus of VT 5A; western end of concurrency with VT 5A
Orleans	Derby	63.309	101.886	VT 111 east – Morgan	Western terminus of VT 111
Orleans	Charleston	69.701	112.173	VT 5A south – Lake Willoughby, West Burke	Eastern end of concurrency with VT 5A
Essex	Brighton	79.868	128.535	VT 114 south (East Haven Road)	Western end of concurrency with VT 114
Essex	Brighton	81.976	131.928	VT 114 north (Railroad Street)	Eastern end of concurrency with VT 114
Essex	Bloomfield	98.099	157.875	VT 102 – Brunswick, Maidstone, Lemington	
Essex	Bloomfield	98.135	157.933	US 3	New Hampshire state line; access via Bridge Street
1.000 mi = 1.609 km; 1.000 km = 0.621 mi: Concurrency terminus

== Vermont Route 105A ==
Vermont Route 105A
- Location: Richford
- Length: 1.799 mi (2.895 km)

Vermont Route 105A is a 1.799-mile-long (2.895 km) north–south state highway, entirely within Richford, Vermont. Its southern terminus is VT 105. It runs parallel with the Missisquoi River to the Canadian border, terminating at the East Richford–Glen Sutton Border Crossing and the Missisquoi River Bridge.
