= Vermont Route 235 =

State highway in Franklin County, Vermont, US

Vermont Route 235
- VT 235 highlighted in red

Route information
- Maintained by the Town of Franklin
- Length: 4.64 mi (7.47 km)

Major junctions
- South end: VT 120 in Franklin
- North end: R-235 at the Canadian border in Morses Line

Location
- Country: United States
- State: Vermont
- Counties: Franklin

Highway system
- State highways in Vermont
← VT 232	→ VT 236

Vermont Route 235 (VT 235) is a 4.64-mile-long (7.47 km) state-numbered highway in Franklin County, Vermont, United States. It runs from VT 120 in Franklin northwest to the Morses Line Border Crossing near the village of Morses Line, where it crosses into Quebec, Canada, and connects to Quebec Route 235, from which it derives its number. The entire route is town-maintained and internally designated as major collector 299. Locally, the route is known as Morses Line Road.

== Route description ==
VT 235 begins in the south at VT 120 in the town of Franklin. It runs north and west for just over 3 miles (4.8 km), into the small village of Morses Line situated about 0.5 miles (0.80 km) south of the Canada–United States border. Here, VT 235 meets the northern terminus of VT 207 and then turns directly north and crosses the border into Quebec, where it meets Quebec Route 235 in Saint-Armand.

== Major intersections ==
The entire route is in Franklin, Franklin County.

mi	km	Destinations	Notes
0.00	0.00	VT 120 – East Franklin, Franklin	Southern terminus
4.08	6.57	VT 207 south to I-89 – Highgate, Lake Champlain	Village of Morses Line; northern terminus of VT 207
4.64	7.47	R-235 north	Continuation into Quebec, Morses Line Border Crossing
1.000 mi = 1.609 km; 1.000 km = 0.621 mi
