= Lake Carmi =

Lake in Vermont, U.S.

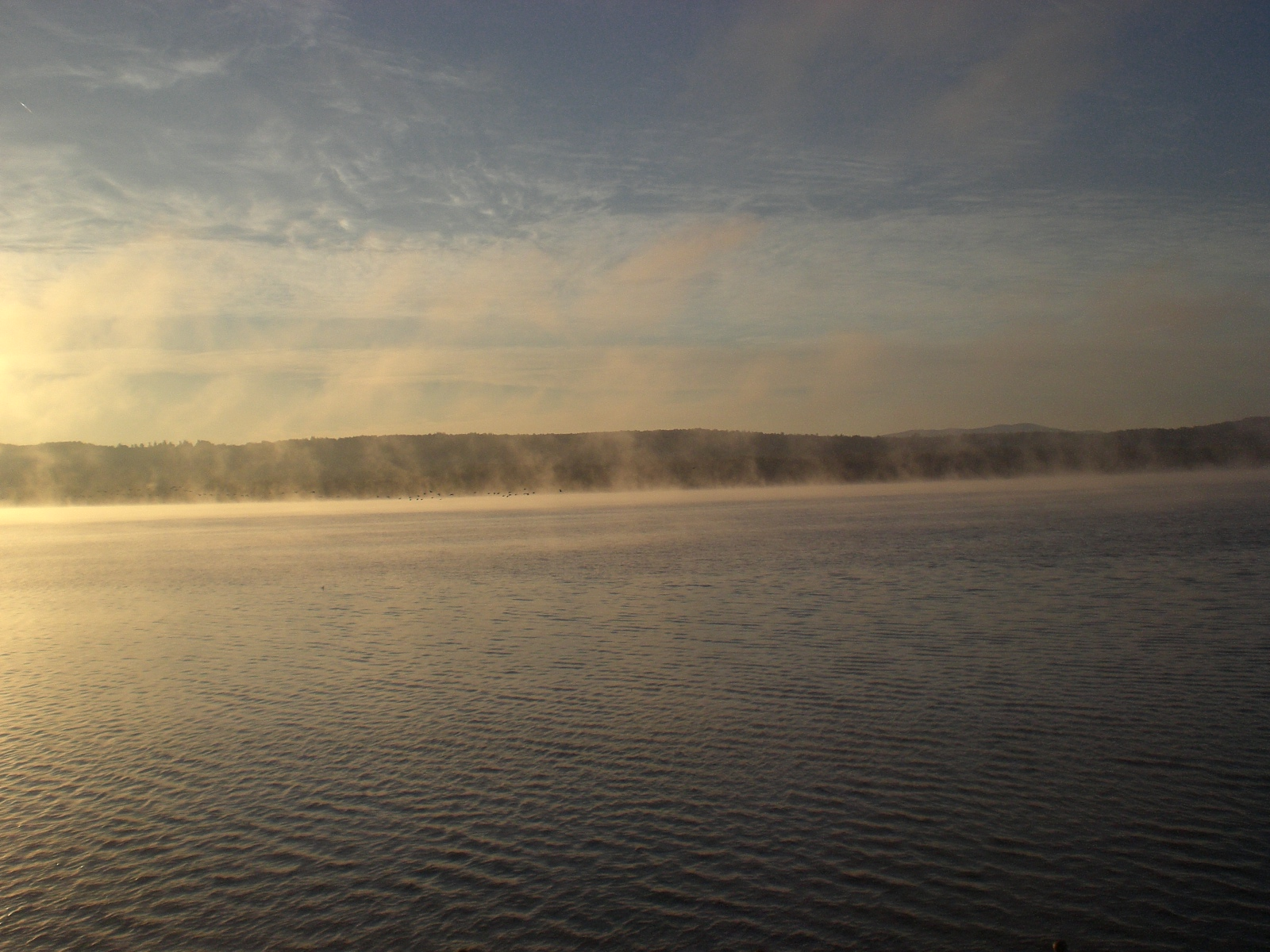
- Lake Carmi at Sunrise looking east

- Location within Vermont Location within the United States
- Location: Franklin County, Vermont
- Coordinates: 44°58′N 72°52′W
- Basin countries: United States
- Surface area: 1,375 acres (5.56 km^{2})
- Average depth: 20 ft (6.1 m)
- Max. depth: 33 ft (10 m)
- Surface elevation: 436 ft (133 m)

Lake Carmi is a small and relatively shallow lake located in the town of Franklin, in the northwest corner of Vermont, United States. It is the fourth largest lake located entirely within Vermont, and has a 1,375 acres (5.56 km^{2}) surface area, an average depth of 20 ft (6.1 m) and a maximum depth of 33 ft (10 m).

Lake Carmi supports many species of fish, including northern pike and walleye. The lake drains northwards into the Pike River in Quebec. Lake Carmi was once much larger. In the thousands of years since the last ice age, the southern end of the original lake has silted in, creating wetland forests and the third largest peat bog in Vermont.

== Facilities ==
At the southern end of the lake, Lake Carmi State Park offers camping facilities. Vermont Route 120 runs along the northern shoreline.

== Name ==
The name Lake Carmi was officially adopted in 1910 in honor of Carmi L. Marsh, a resident of Franklin who enlisted in the Union Army for the Civil War and was commissioned as a second lieutenant in the 13th Vermont Infantry. Marsh later served in the Vermont House of Representatives and Vermont Senate and as judge advocate of the Vermont Militia. Previously the lake had been called Silver Lake or Franklin Pond.
