= Albert M. Skeels =

19th century American politician

9th Mayor of Ripon, Wisconsin
- In office April 1866 – April 1867
- Preceded by: Henry T. Henton
- Succeeded by: Samuel Sumner

Member of the Wisconsin State Assembly from the Fond du Lac 1st district
- In office January 1, 1866 – January 6, 1868
- Preceded by: D. C. Van Ostrand
- Succeeded by: Henry C. Bottum

Personal details
- Born: February 27, 1813 Swanton, Vermont, U.S.
- Died: January 6, 1876 (aged 62) Ripon, Wisconsin, U.S.
- Cause of death: Stroke
- Resting place: Hillside Cemetery, Ripon, Wisconsin
- Party: Republican
- Spouse: Mary S. Eggleston (died 1896)
- Children: Albert Henry Skeels^{(b. 1840; died 1840)}; Harriet M. Skeels^{(b. 1841; died 1852)}; Mary Louise (Rice)^{(b. 1846; died 1924)}; Clara E. (Barnett)^{(b. 1853; died 1933)}

Albert M. Skeels (February 27, 1813 – January 6, 1876) was an American businessman and politician. He was the 9th mayor of Ripon, Wisconsin, and served two terms in the Wisconsin State Assembly, representing Fond du Lac County.

== Biography ==
Born in Swanton, Vermont, he moved to Ripon, Wisconsin in 1853 and was a merchant. He served as postmaster of Ripon, Wisconsin and was president of the Ripon Agricultural Society. He also served as trustee of the Insane Asylum. In 1866, Skeels served as mayor of Ripon, Wisconsin. Then, in 1866 and 1867, Skeels served in the Wisconsin State Assembly and was a Republican. He suffered a stroke in Ripon in January 1876, and died a few days later.
