= Vermont Route 236 =

State highway in Franklin County, Vermont, US

Vermont Route 236
- State Park Road
- VT 236 highlighted in red

Route information
- Maintained by VTrans
- Existed: 1972–present

Major junctions
- South end: VT 105 in Sheldon
- North end: VT 120 in Franklin

Location
- Country: United States
- State: Vermont
- Counties: Franklin

Highway system
- State highways in Vermont
← VT 235	→ VT 242

Vermont Route 236 (VT 236) is a 6.169-mile-long (9.928 km) state highway located entirely in Franklin County, Vermont, United States. The route begins at an intersection with VT 105 in the town of Sheldon, serving as a road connecting to Lake Carmi State Park. The route's northern terminus is located at a junction with VT 120 in Franklin and the hamlet of East Franklin not far from VT 108 and the Canada–US border. The route was designated as VT 236 in 1972.

== Route description ==
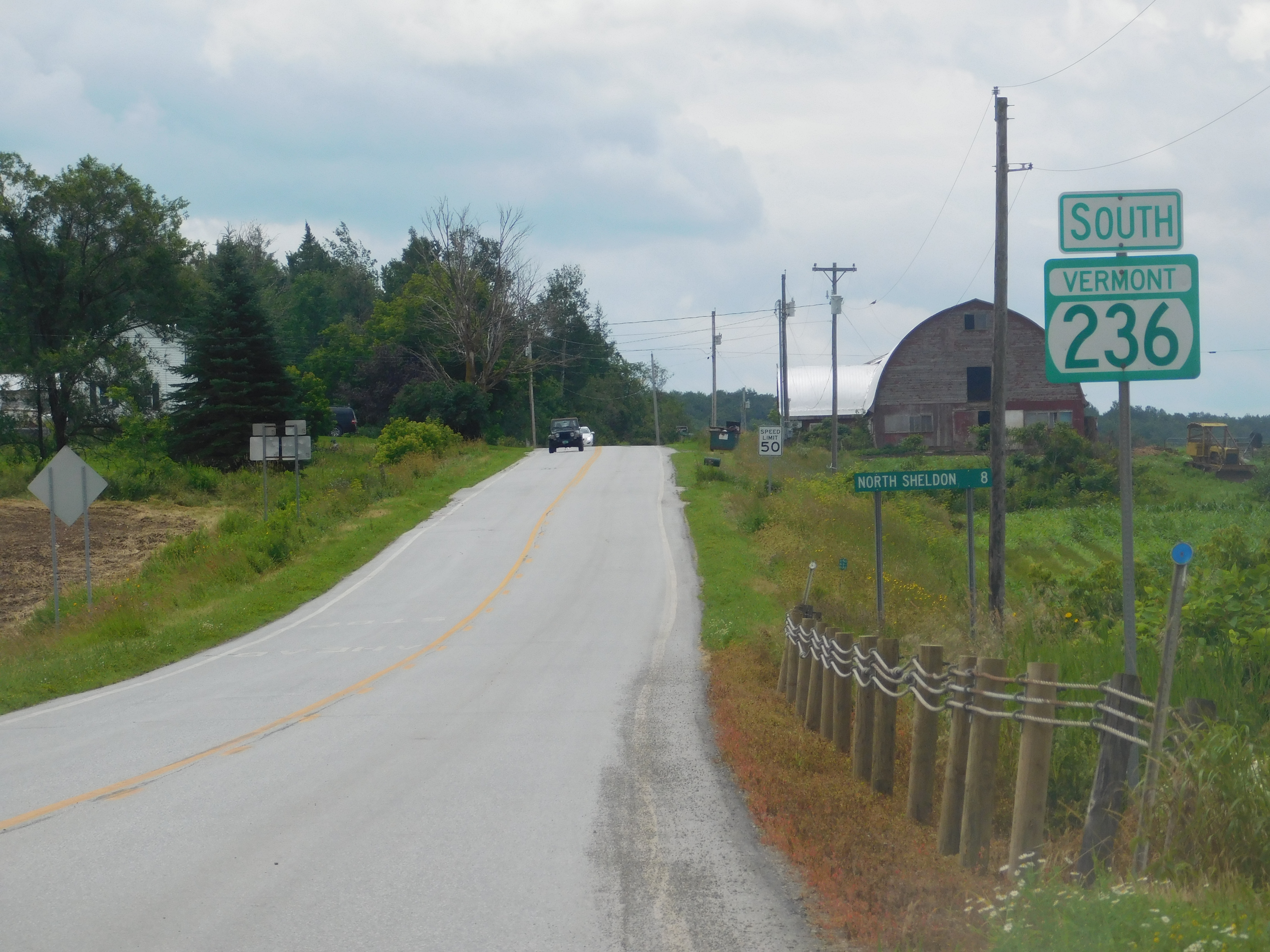
VT 236 in Franklin

VT 236 begins at an intersection with VT 105 in the Franklin County town of Sheldon on the banks of the Missisquoi River. Known as State Park Road, VT 236 runs north as a two-lane rural road through Sheldon, passing several local farms and residences in the area. Just over a mile from the junction, the route leaves the town of Sheldon and crosses into the town of Franklin. After a junction with Swamp Road and Stanley Road, VT 236 bends northwest, running along the eastern edge of Lake Carmi State Park. Soon reaching the northeastern edge of the park, VT 236 turns north and intersects with Marsh Farm Road, which serves as the main road through the state park. The route turns northeast after Lake Carmi State Park, crossing through fields and farms in Franklin. The route crosses a junction with Dewing Road, which connects VT 236 to VT 120.

However, VT 236 winds northeast through the farms of Franklin and soon reaches the hamlet of East Franklin, reaching a junction with VT 120 (Lake Road). This junction marks the northern terminus of VT 236, just west of VT 108 and south of the Canada–US border.

== History ==
VT 236 originally existed as the Sheldon–Franklin State Highway, maintained by the state of Vermont. In 1972, the road was designated as VT 236 after decision by the state legislature.

== Major intersections ==
The entire route is in Franklin County.

Location	mi	km	Destinations	Notes
Sheldon	0.000	0.000	VT 105 – Enosburg Falls, Richford, North Sheldon, St. Albans	Southern terminus
Franklin	2.980	4.796	Marsh Farm Road	Access to Lake Carmi State Park
Franklin	6.169	9.928	VT 120 (Lake Road) – West Berkshire, Franklin	Northern terminus
1.000 mi = 1.609 km; 1.000 km = 0.621 mi
