= Vermont Route 191 =

State highway in Orleans County, Vermont, US

Vermont Route 191
- VT 191 highlighted in red

Route information
- Maintained by VTrans
- Length: 2.290 mi (3.685 km)

Major junctions
- South end: East of I-91 in Derby
- North end: US 5 / VT 105 in Newport

Location
- Country: United States
- State: Vermont
- Counties: Orleans

Highway system
- State highways in Vermont
← I-189	→ VT 207

Vermont Route 191 (VT 191) is a short 2.290-mile-long (3.685 km) state highway in Orleans County, Vermont, United States. It serves as a connection from Interstate 91 (I-91) in Derby to U.S. Route 5 (US 5) and VT 105 in the city of Newport. The route is signed north–south, but it runs almost entirely from east to west.

== Route description ==
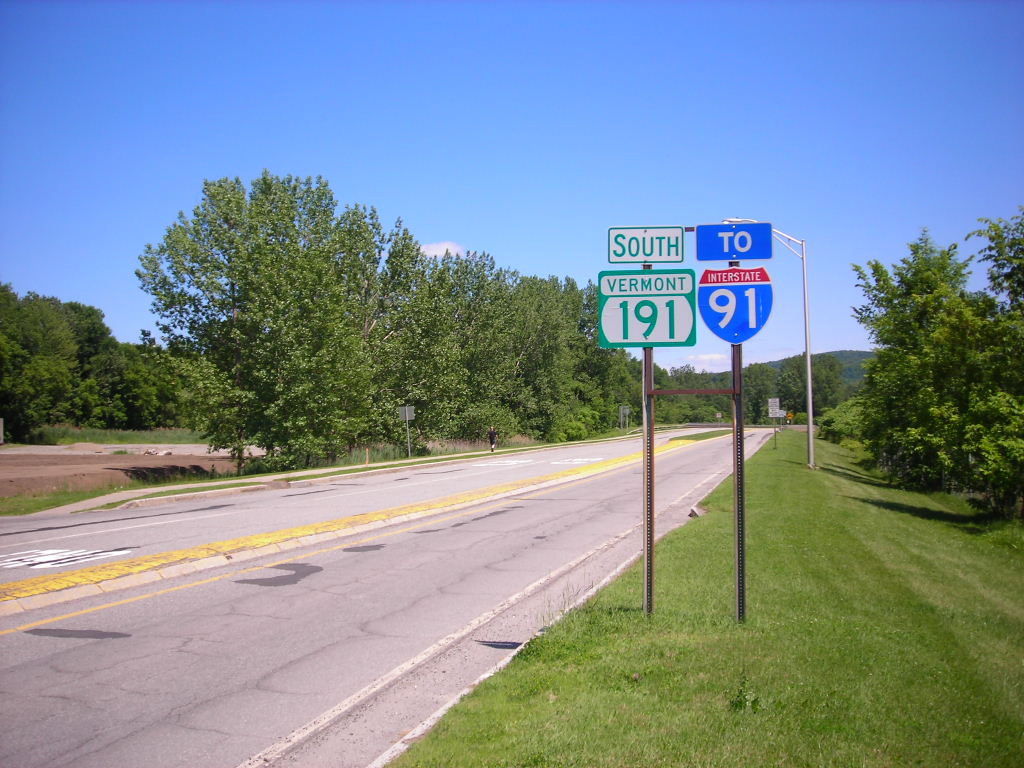
VT 191 heading southbound towards Interstate 91.

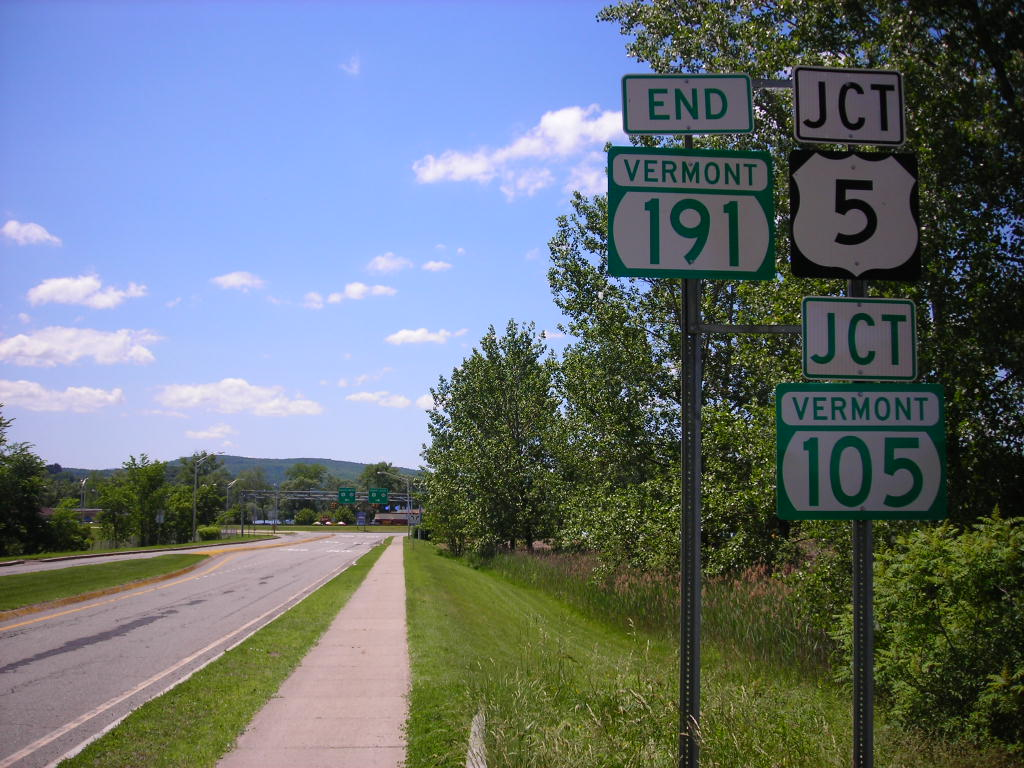
Northern terminus in Newport

Vermont Route 191 begins in the south at an interchange with I-91 at Exit 27, located southwest of the town of Derby, and east-southeast of the city of Newport. Route 191 heads to the northwest, passing into the city after a couple of miles. About 0.5 miles (0.8 km) from its end, Route 191 splits into a four-lane divided highway, and passes westward into the heart of the city. It ends at an intersection with the "Causeway" (US 5, VT 105).

== Major intersections ==
The entire route is in Orleans County.

Location	mi	km	Destinations	Notes
Town of Derby	0.000	0.000	Cross Road	Southern terminus; end of state maintenance east of I-91
Town of Derby	0.103– 0.256	0.166– 0.412	I-91 – Canada, St. Johnsbury	Exit 27 (I-91); partial cloverleaf interchange
City of Newport	2.290	3.685	US 5 / VT 105	Northern terminus
1.000 mi = 1.609 km; 1.000 km = 0.621 mi
