= Vermont Route F-5 =

State highway in Chittenden County, Vermont, US

Vermont Route F-5
- Ferry Road
- VT F-5 highlighted in red

Route information
- Maintained by the town of Charlotte
- Length: 2.89 mi (4.65 km)
- Existed: late 1920s–present

Major junctions
- West end: Charlotte–Essex Ferry in Charlotte
- East end: US 7 in Charlotte

Location
- Country: United States
- State: Vermont
- Counties: Chittenden

Highway system
- State highways in Vermont
← VT F-4	→ VT F-6

Vermont Route F-5 (VT F-5) is a town-maintained state highway located in Chittenden County, Vermont, in the United States. The route, assigned in the late 1920s, is the last remaining F-X designation in Vermont. F-X route designations were previously used for roads leading to ferries across Lake Champlain. VT F-5's western terminus is at the Charlotte–Essex Ferry traversing Lake Champlain, which links VT F-5 with New York State Route 22 (NY 22) on the opposite side of the lake. The eastern terminus is at an intersection with U.S. Route 7 (US 7) in Charlotte. It is known as Ferry Road for its entire length.

== Route description ==
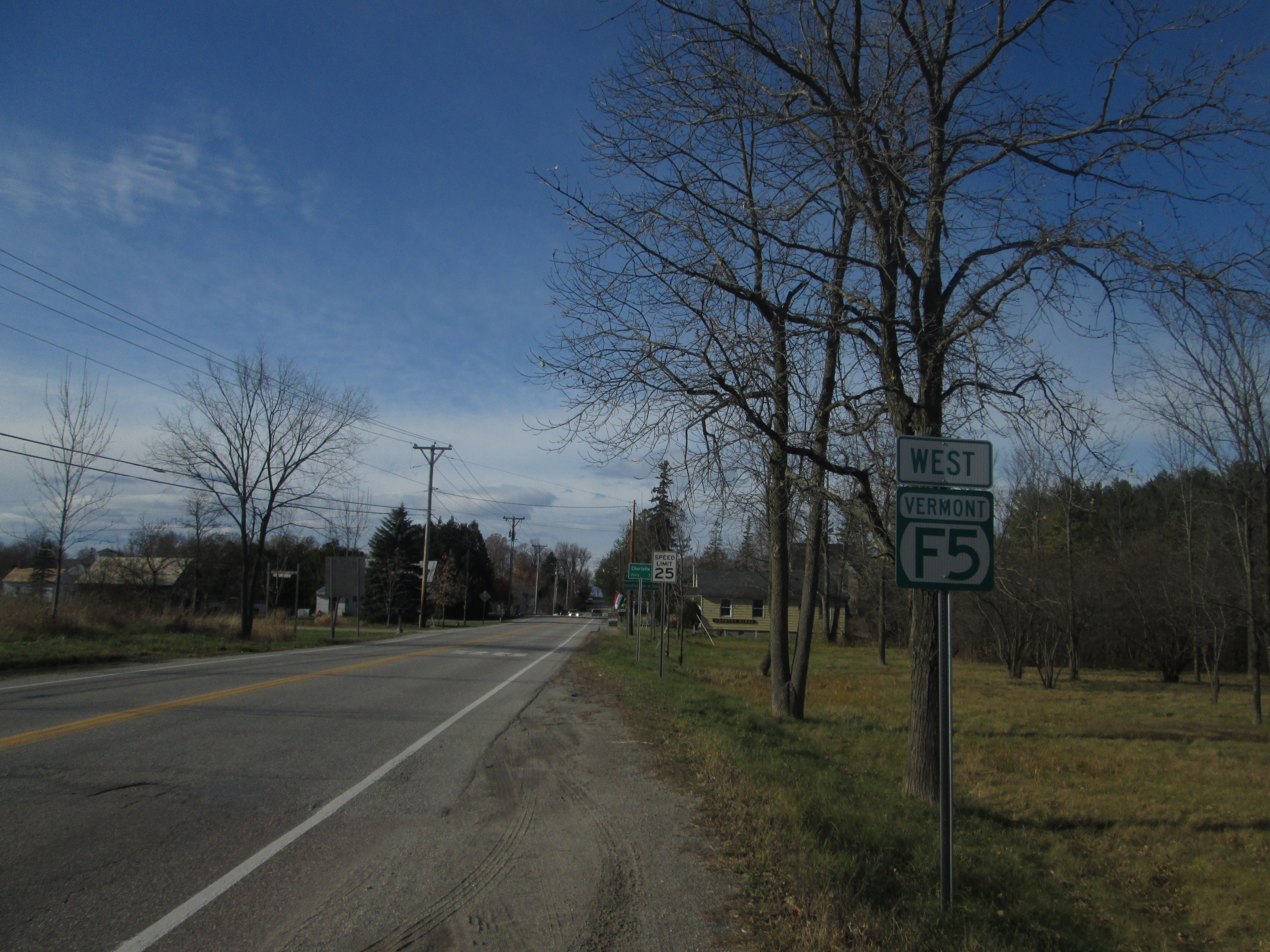
VT F-5 heading westward from US 7 towards the Charlotte–Essex Ferry

From the Charlotte–Essex Ferry dock on the east bank of Lake Champlain in Charlotte, VT F-5 curves to the east for a short time before turning to the north. After a half-mile, Ferry Road and VT F-5 turn for the final time, making an eastward turn onto a straightway that leads to US 7.

Despite the lack of curves on the 2.3-mile (3.7 km) straightaway, the hilly terrain of the area makes navigating the road a challenge at times.

== History ==
VT F-5 was assigned in the late 1920s as part of a series of 11 F-X routes connecting ferries across Lake Champlain from New York to the remainder of the Vermont state highway system. The routes were numbered from VT F-1 to VT F-10 (with one suffixed route, VT F-9A) and assigned in order from north to south, with VT F-1 connecting to the northernmost ferry between the two states. A 12th route, VT F-10A, was added ca. 1930, but merged with VT F-9 by the following year.

Over the next three decades, many of the F-X routes were eliminated or renumbered to standard numerical designations as all but four Lake Champlain ferries ceased operations. By the early 1960s, only two F-X routes remained: VT F-5 and VT F-3, a loop route on Grand Isle serving the Grand Isle–Plattsburgh Ferry. VT F-3 was renumbered to VT 314 ca. 1964, leaving VT F-5 as the last F-X route.

== Major intersections ==
The entire route is in Charlotte, Chittenden County.

mi	km	Destinations	Notes
0.00	0.00	Charlotte–Essex Ferry	To NY 22
2.89	4.65	US 7 – Burlington, Rutland	
1.000 mi = 1.609 km; 1.000 km = 0.621 mi
