= Sheldon Springs, Vermont =

Sheldon Springs, Vermont Olmstead Falls, Vermont
- Unincorporated community
- Location within Vermont Location within the United States
- Coordinates: 44°54′22″N 72°58′39″W
- Country: United States
- State: Vermont
- County: Franklin
- Elevation: 299 ft (91 m)
- Time zone: UTC-5 (Eastern (EST))
  - Summer (DST): UTC-4 (EDT)
- ZIP Code: 05485
- Area code: 802
- GNIS feature ID: 1459486

Sheldon Springs is an unincorporated community village in the town of Sheldon in Franklin County, Vermont, United States. It lies at an altitude of 299 feet (91 m). A post office was established in 1871.

At one time it was known as Olmstead Falls.
