= Swanton (town), Vermont =

Town of Swanton
- Town
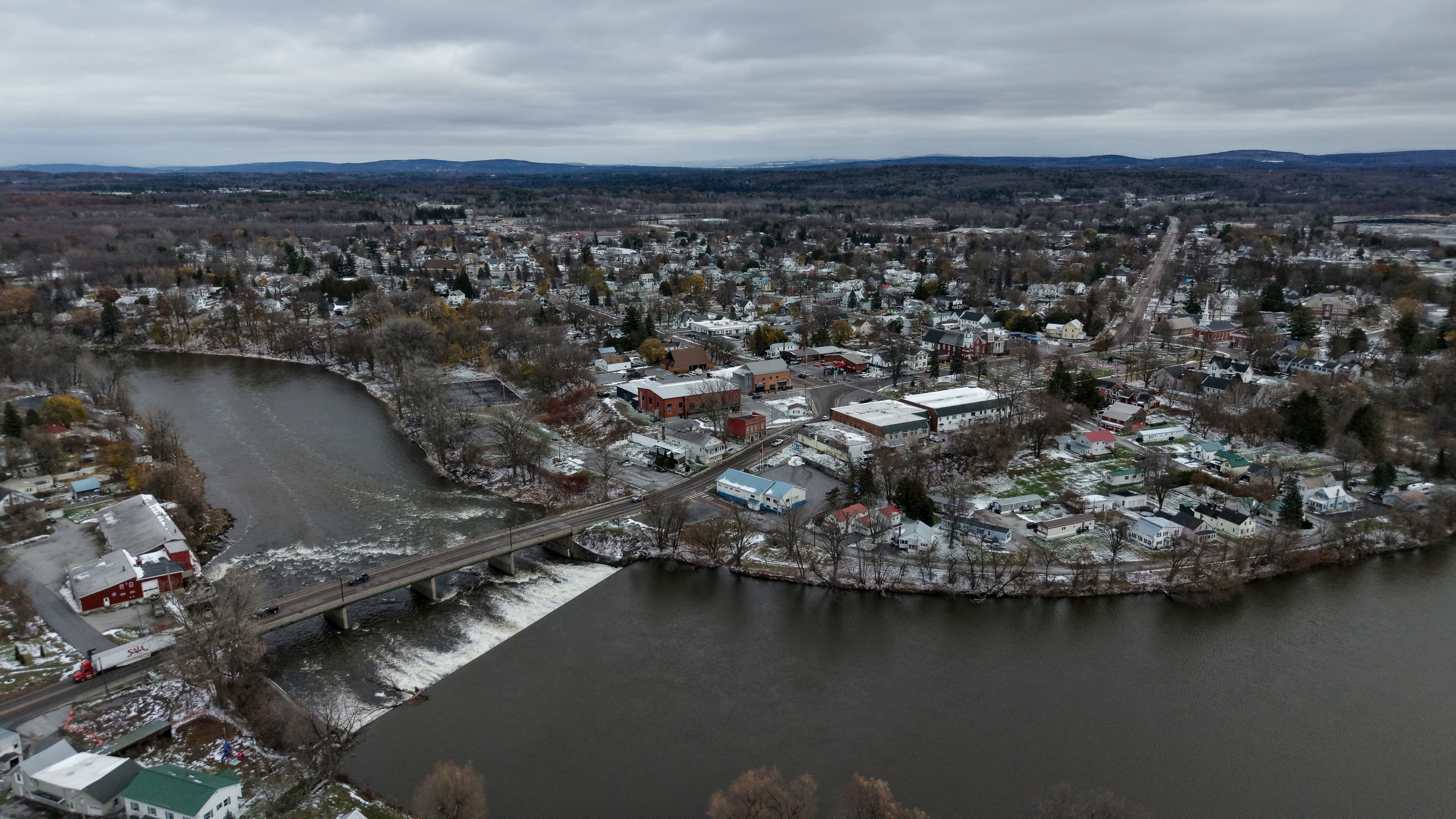
- Swanton, VT, from the west

- Seal

- Location in Franklin County and the state of Vermont
- Coordinates: 44°53′45″N 73°07′30″W
- Country: United States
- State: Vermont
- County: Franklin
- Communities: Swanton; Fonda; Greens Corners; Maquam; Skeels Corners; West Swanton

Area
  - Total: 61.7 sq mi (159.7 km^{2})
  - Land: 48.0 sq mi (124.4 km^{2})
  - Water: 13.6 sq mi (35.3 km^{2})
- Elevation: 135 ft (41 m)

Population (2020)
  - Total: 6,701
  - Density: 139.5/sq mi (53.87/km^{2})
- Time zone: UTC-5 (Eastern (EST))
  - Summer (DST): UTC-4 (EDT)
- ZIP Codes: 05488 (Swanton); 05478 (St. Albans); 05483 (Sheldon); 05455 (Fairfield)
- Area code: 802
- FIPS Code: 50-011-71725
- GNIS feature ID: 1462225
- Website: www.swantonvt.gov

Swanton is a town in Franklin County, Vermont, United States. The population was 6,701 at the 2020 census. The town includes the village of Swanton.

== History ==
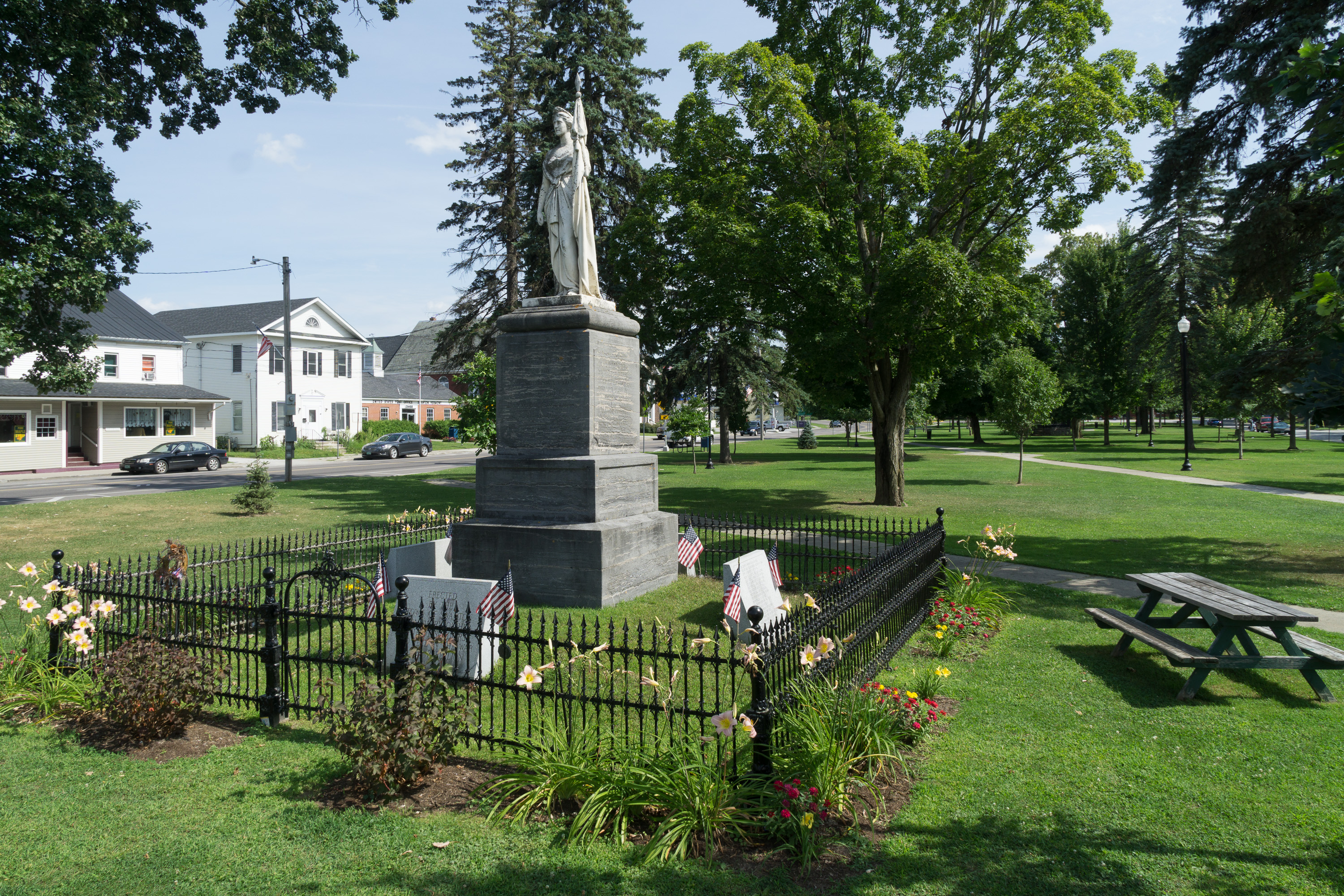
A Civil War memorial stands in Swanton's Village Green, in the center of town

The town of Swanton was chartered in 1763 as one of the New Hampshire Grants by Benning Wentworth, the governor of the Province of New Hampshire. It was named for Captain William Swanton, an officer in the British Army who had traveled through the area during the French and Indian War.

There were French land grants in the area beginning in 1734, and small French settlements including a Catholic mission in what is now Swanton from as early as 1740, when settlers in Quebec used a water route from Quebec City and Montreal to reach the banks of the Missisquoi River near what are now known as Swanton Falls.

None of the original grantees who received the charter from Governor Wentworth settled or resided in Swanton, opting instead to sell or trade their shares. Because of its proximity to the border with New France, and later the Province of Quebec, it was not populated by anyone from the British colonies in the 1760s and 1770s, the newly independent United States in the 1770s and 1780s, or the Vermont Republic in the early 1780s. As late as 1786, Ira Allen owned 59 of the original 64 shares.

In 2013, human artifacts dating from 7,000 years ago were found near the Missisquoi River, including a Neville-type stone object that might have been attached to a spear.

== Geography ==
Swanton is located in western Franklin County, bordered on the west by Lake Champlain and Grand Isle County. The town limits extend northwest to the Canada–United States border within Missisquoi Bay, west of Highgate. St. Albans, the Franklin County seat, is to the south.

Interstate 89 and U.S. Route 7 run more or less parallel in a north-south direction through the town, with US 7 passing through the village of Swanton and I-89 providing access from Exit 21 just east of the village. Vermont Route 78 crosses US 7 in the center of Swanton village, leading east to Enosburg Falls and west across Lake Champlain to Alburg. Vermont Route 36 leads west from Swanton village to Lake Champlain, then turns south along the shore to St. Albans Bay. Vermont Route 207 runs north-south across the town east of I-89, connecting Highgate Center to the north with St. Albans to the south. Vermont Route 105 crosses the east end of the town, leading northeast to Enosburg Falls and southwest to St. Albans.

According to the United States Census Bureau, the town has a total area of 61.7 square miles (159.7 km^{2}), of which 48.0 square miles (124.4 km^{2}) is land and 13.6 square miles (35.3 km^{2}), or 22.11%, is water.

The village of Swanton is in the north-central part of the town, and the community of Fonda is in the south-central part. Both communities are along US 7. A large portion of the Missisquoi National Wildlife Refuge, where the Missisquoi River enters Lake Champlain, is in the northwestern part of the town.

== Demographics ==
Historical population
Census	Pop.	Note	%±
1790	74		—
1800	858		1,059.5%
1810	1,657		93.1%
1820	1,607		−3.0%
1830	2,158		34.3%
1840	2,313		7.2%
1850	2,824		22.1%
1860	2,678		−5.2%
1870	2,866		7.0%
1880	3,079		7.4%
1890	3,231		4.9%
1900	3,745		15.9%
1910	3,628		−3.1%
1920	3,343		−7.9%
1930	3,433		2.7%
1940	3,543		3.2%
1950	3,740		5.6%
1960	3,946		5.5%
1970	4,622		17.1%
1980	5,141		11.2%
1990	5,636		9.6%
2000	6,203		10.1%
2010	6,427		3.6%
2020	6,701		4.3%
U.S. Decennial Census

As of the census of 2000, there were 6,203 people, 2,329 households, and 1,700 families residing in the town. The population density was 128.1 people per square mile (49.5/km^{2}). There were 2,689 housing units at an average density of 55.6/sq mi (21.4/km^{2}). The racial makeup of the town was 93.10% White, 0.42% Black or African American, 3.40% Native American, 0.45% Asian, 0.02% Pacific Islander, 0.18% from other races, and 2.43% from two or more races. Hispanic or Latino of any race were 0.44% of the population.

There were 2,329 households, out of which 35.6% had children under the age of 18 living with them, 57.4% were married couples living together, 11.2% had a female householder with no husband present, and 27.0% were non-families. 20.3% of all households were made up of individuals, and 9.9% had someone living alone who was 65 years of age or older. The average household size was 2.66 and the average family size was 3.05.

In the town, the population was spread out, with 27.7% under the age of 18, 7.1% from 18 to 24, 29.4% from 25 to 44, 23.3% from 45 to 64, and 12.5% who were 65 years of age or older. The median age was 36 years. For every 100 females, there were 95.1 males. For every 100 females age 18 and over, there were 91.9 males.

The median income for a household in the town was $41,086, and the median income for a family was $45,810. Males had a median income of $32,789 versus $25,579 for females. The per capita income for the town was $18,228. About 7.2% of families and 9.2% of the population were below the poverty line, including 12.8% of those under age 18 and 9.5% of those age 65 or over.

== Local organizations ==
The Abenaki Nation of Missisquoi, also known as the Mississquoi Abenaki Tribe, a state-recognized tribe that claims descent from Missisquoi people, is based in Swanton. This organization is not federally recognized as a Native American tribe.

== Swans ==
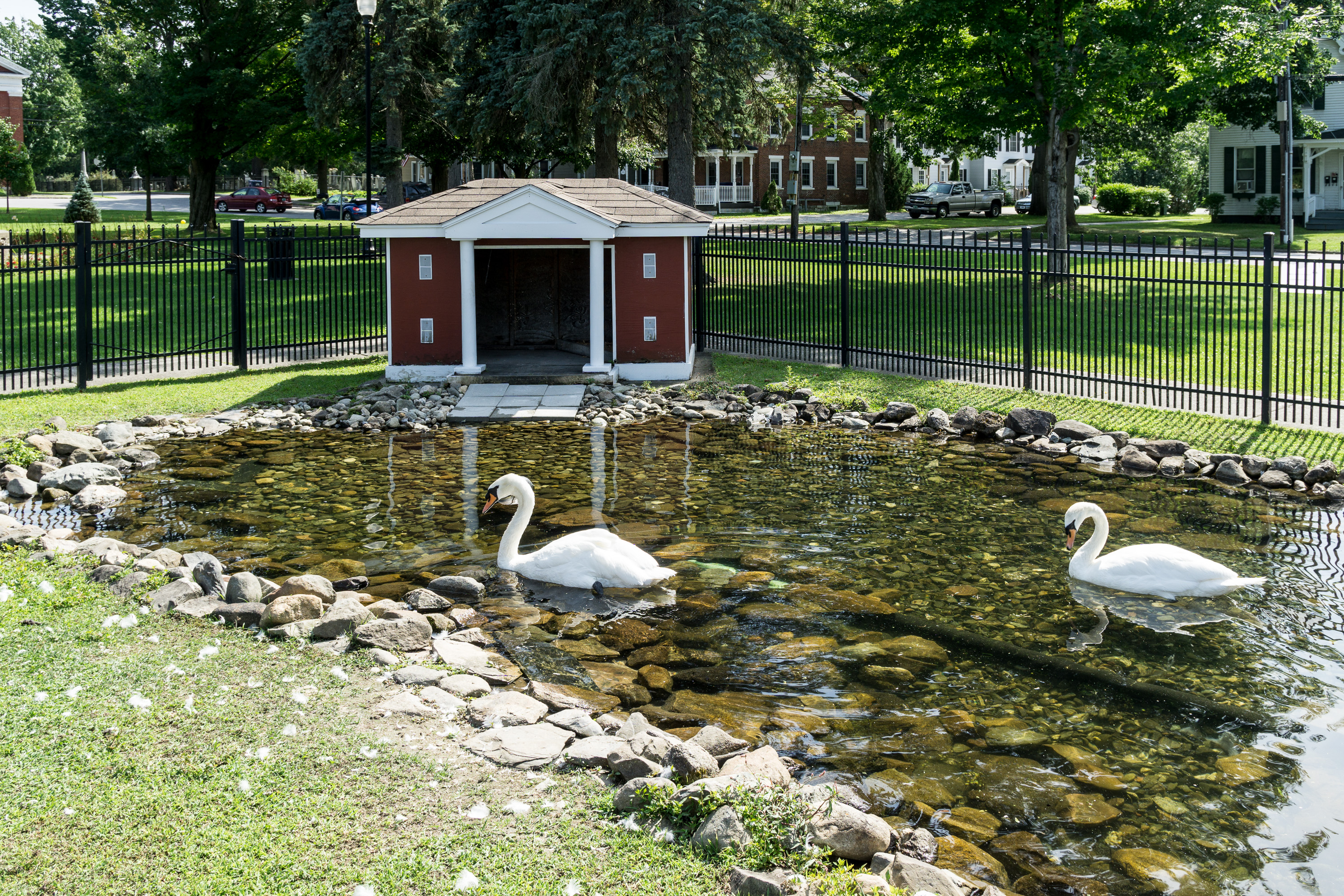
A new pair of Royal Swans took up residence in Swanton's Village Green Park in 2017.

In 1961, Queen Elizabeth II gifted a pair of her Royal Swans to the Town of Swanton at their annual Summer Festival. Swanton Chamber of Commerce members named the swans Sam (for Uncle Sam) and Betty (for Queen Elizabeth). The idea for the swans came from a summer visitor to the area, Harry Gibbons, who worked in public relations for the International Air Transport Authority of Montreal. He presented his idea to the Chamber and a letter of request was sent to Buckingham Palace. The request was granted and the swans were sent from Hickling Broad, Norfolk, England through the Smallburgh Rural District Council which includes the village of Swanton Abbott.

"The swans were caught during the annual "swan-upping" outing held by members of England's ancient guilds, who mark the Queen's swans with a nick on the beak to separate them from their less exalted brethren." The swans were presented to Vermont Governor F. Ray Keyser by a representative of the Canadian Government at a ceremony attended by dignitaries from both sides of the border.

Before summer 2016, the swans died of old age. After a gap of two years, a new set of swans (still named Sam and Betty) were secured and placed in their home in Village Green Park, surrounded by a black fence. The new swans are not related to, or descended from, the originals, but they are still called the Royal Swans.

== Education ==
It is in the Franklin Northwest Supervisory Union school district.

== Notable people ==
- Stephen F. Brown, Union Army officer in the American Civil War
- Lucien B. Caswell, US congressman from Wisconsin
- James Fisk, member of the United States House of Representatives and United States Senate
- Oscar Clark Hathaway, Wisconsin state senator
- Albert B. Jewett, commander of the 10th Vermont Infantry Regiment during the American Civil War
- William B. La Selle, Wisconsin state assemblyman
- Albert Whittemore Sanborn, Wisconsin state senator
- M. Emmet Walsh, actor
