= Morses Line, Vermont =

- Unincorporated community
- Location within Vermont Location within the United States
- Coordinates: 45°00′44″N 72°58′41″W
- Country: United States
- State: Vermont
- County: Franklin
- Elevation: 295 ft (90 m)
- Time zone: UTC-5 (Eastern (EST))
  - Summer (DST): UTC-4 (EDT)
- ZIP Code: 05457 (Franklin)
- Area code: 802
- GNIS feature ID: 1458553

Morses Line is an unincorporated community in the town of Franklin, Franklin County, Vermont, United States. Morses Line is located on the International Boundary between Canada and the United States 5 miles (8 km) northwest of the center of Franklin. It is the site of the Morses Line Border Crossing connecting the towns of Franklin and Saint-Armand, Quebec.

The second J. Morse line store was opened at this location in 1871, under the proprietorship of J.M. Hill, Jr. The hamlet is named after the store around which it grew.
