= Lake Carmi State Park =

State park in Franklin County, Vermont

- Location within Vermont
- Interactive map of Lake Carmi State Park
- Location: Enosburg Falls, Vermont, United States
- Coordinates: 44°57′25″N 72°52′32″W
- Area: 482 acres (195 ha)
- Established: 1959
- Administrator: Vermont Department of Forests, Parks, and Recreation
- Website: Official website
- Vermont State Parks

Lake Carmi State Park is a day-use state park near Enosburg Falls, Vermont in the United States. Located on Vermont Route 236, the park includes over two miles of frontage on the south and east shore of Lake Carmi. Activities include camping, swimming, fishing, boating, hiking, nature programs, bicycling, picnicking, wildlife watching and winter sports. Camping facilities include 138 tent/RV sites, 35 lean-to sites, 2 cabins, restrooms with running water and hot showers, and a trailer dump station. Other facilities include swimming beaches in each campground, a day use beach, canoe, kayak and rowboat rentals, and a boat launch. The state has designated 140 acres as Lake Carmi Bog Natural Area.
