= Sheldon, Vermont =

- Town
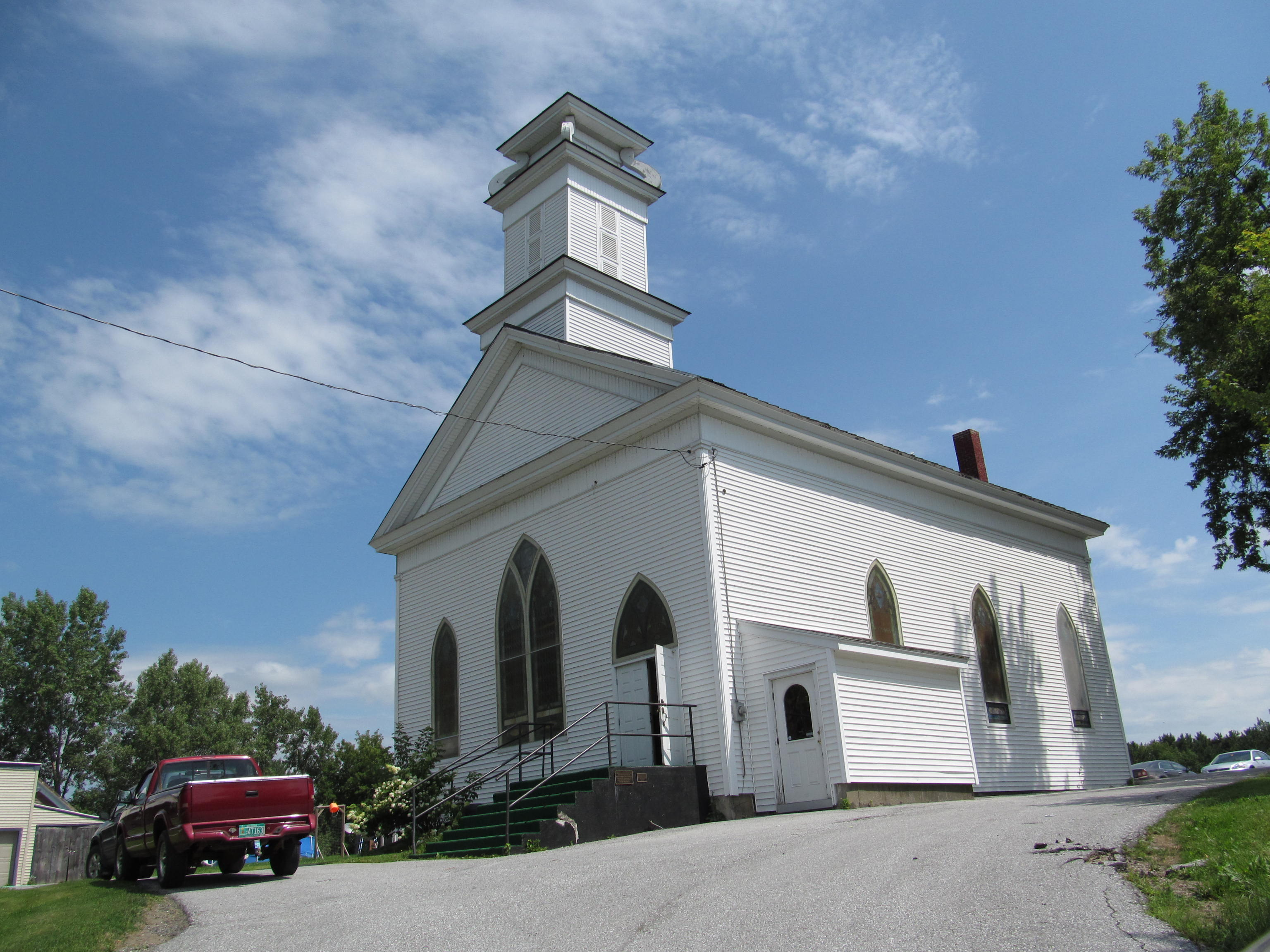
- Sheldon United Methodist Church, erected 1859

- Seal

- Location in Franklin County and the state of Vermont
- Coordinates: 44°53′25″N 72°54′12″W
- Country: United States
- State: Vermont
- County: Franklin
- Chartered (as "Hungerford"): August 18, 1763
- First European settlement: Spring 1790
- Organized: Spring 1791
- Name changed to "Sheldon": November 8, 1792
- Named for: Elisha Sheldon
- Communities: Sheldon; East Sheldon; North Sheldon; Shawville; Sheldon Junction; Sheldon Springs; South Franklin

Area
  - Total: 39.5 sq mi (102.4 km^{2})
  - Land: 38.8 sq mi (100.5 km^{2})
  - Water: 0.73 sq mi (1.9 km^{2})
- Elevation: 502 ft (153 m)
- Highest elevation (Leach Hill): 1,274.2 ft (388.4 m)
- Lowest elevation (Missisquoi River at Highgate, Vermont line): 206 ft (63 m)

Population (2020)
  - Total: 2,136
  - Density: 55/sq mi (21.3/km^{2})
- Time zone: UTC-5 (Eastern (EST))
  - Summer (DST): UTC-4 (EDT)
- ZIP Codes: 05483 (Sheldon); 05485 (Sheldon Springs); 05450 (Enosburg Falls); 05457 (Franklin); 05478 (St. Albans)
- Area code: 802
- FIPS code: 50-64600
- GNIS feature ID: 1462207
- Website: sheldonvt.com

Sheldon is a town in Franklin County, Vermont, United States. The population was 2,136 at the 2020 census. It contains the unincorporated community of Sheldon Springs.

== Geography ==
Sheldon, named for Revolutionary War colonel Elisha Sheldon, was initially called Hungerford, because of the charter, Samuel Hungerford. The town is located in central Franklin County on both sides of the Missisquoi River, a west-flowing tributary of Lake Champlain. Vermont Route 105 follows the river for most of its way through the town, leading east into Enosburg Falls and southwest to St. Albans, the county seat. Vermont Route 78 leads northwest from Sheldon Junction down the Missisquoi to Highgate Center and Swanton. Vermont Route 120 leads north from North Sheldon to Franklin, and Vermont Route 236 leads north from South Franklin (in the eastern part of Sheldon) to East Franklin. Sheldon Springs is in the west part of Sheldon along Route 105 south of the Missisquoi.

According to the United States Census Bureau, the town has a total area of 39.5 square miles (102.4 km^{2}), of which 38.8 square miles (100.5 km^{2}) is land and 0.73 square miles (1.9 km^{2}), or 1.85%, is water.

== Demographics ==
Historical population
Census	Pop.	Note	%±
1790	40		—
1800	408		920.0%
1810	883		116.4%
1820	927		5.0%
1830	1,427		53.9%
1840	1,734		21.5%
1850	1,814		4.6%
1860	1,655		−8.8%
1870	1,697		2.5%
1880	1,529		−9.9%
1890	1,365		−10.7%
1900	1,341		−1.8%
1910	1,246		−7.1%
1920	1,473		18.2%
1930	1,563		6.1%
1940	1,471		−5.9%
1950	1,352		−8.1%
1960	1,281		−5.3%
1970	1,481		15.6%
1980	1,618		9.3%
1990	1,748		8.0%
2000	1,990		13.8%
2010	2,190		10.1%
2020	2,136		−2.5%
U.S. Decennial Census

As of the census of 2000, there were 1,990 people, 672 households, and 544 families residing in the town. The population density was 51.5 people per square mile (19.9/km^{2}). There were 691 housing units at an average density of 17.9 per square mile (6.9/km^{2}). The racial makeup of the town was 95.38% White, 0.15% Black or African American, 2.31% Native American, 0.10% Pacific Islander, and 2.06% from two or more races. Hispanic or Latino of any race were 0.45% of the population. 39% were of French and French Canadian ancestry, 14% Irish, and 10% English.

There were 672 households, out of which 42.7% had children under the age of 18 living with them, 65.9% were married couples living together, 10.0% had a female householder with no husband present, and 19.0% were non-families. 12.9% of all households were made up of individuals, and 4.0% had someone living alone who was 65 years of age or older. The average household size was 2.94 and the average family size was 3.15.

In the town, the population was spread out, with 31.0% under the age of 18, 6.5% from 18 to 24, 31.9% from 25 to 44, 22.9% from 45 to 64, and 7.6% who were 65 years of age or older. The median age was 34 years. For every 100 females, there were 96.3 males. For every 100 females age 18 and over, there were 97.6 males.

The median income for a household in the town was $42,179, and the median income for a family was $45,833. Males had a median income of $30,870 versus $23,833 for females. The per capita income for the town was $17,134. About 8.2% of families and 10.5% of the population were below the poverty line, including 10.5% of those under age 18 and 17.7% of those age 65 or over.

== Education ==
A public K–8 school is located in Sheldon Springs. Sheldon is one of four towns in the Northern Mountain Valley Union Unified School District, part of the Franklin Northeast Supervisory Union.

== Notable people ==
- Lorenzo A. Babcock, first Attorney General of Minnesota Territory
- Elihu Goodsell, Wisconsin legislator and businessman was born in Sheldon
- Heber C. Kimball, nineteenth-century Mormon apostle, born in Sheldon
- Bob Laraba, professional and collegiate football player
