= Morses Line Border Crossing =

Canada–United States border crossing

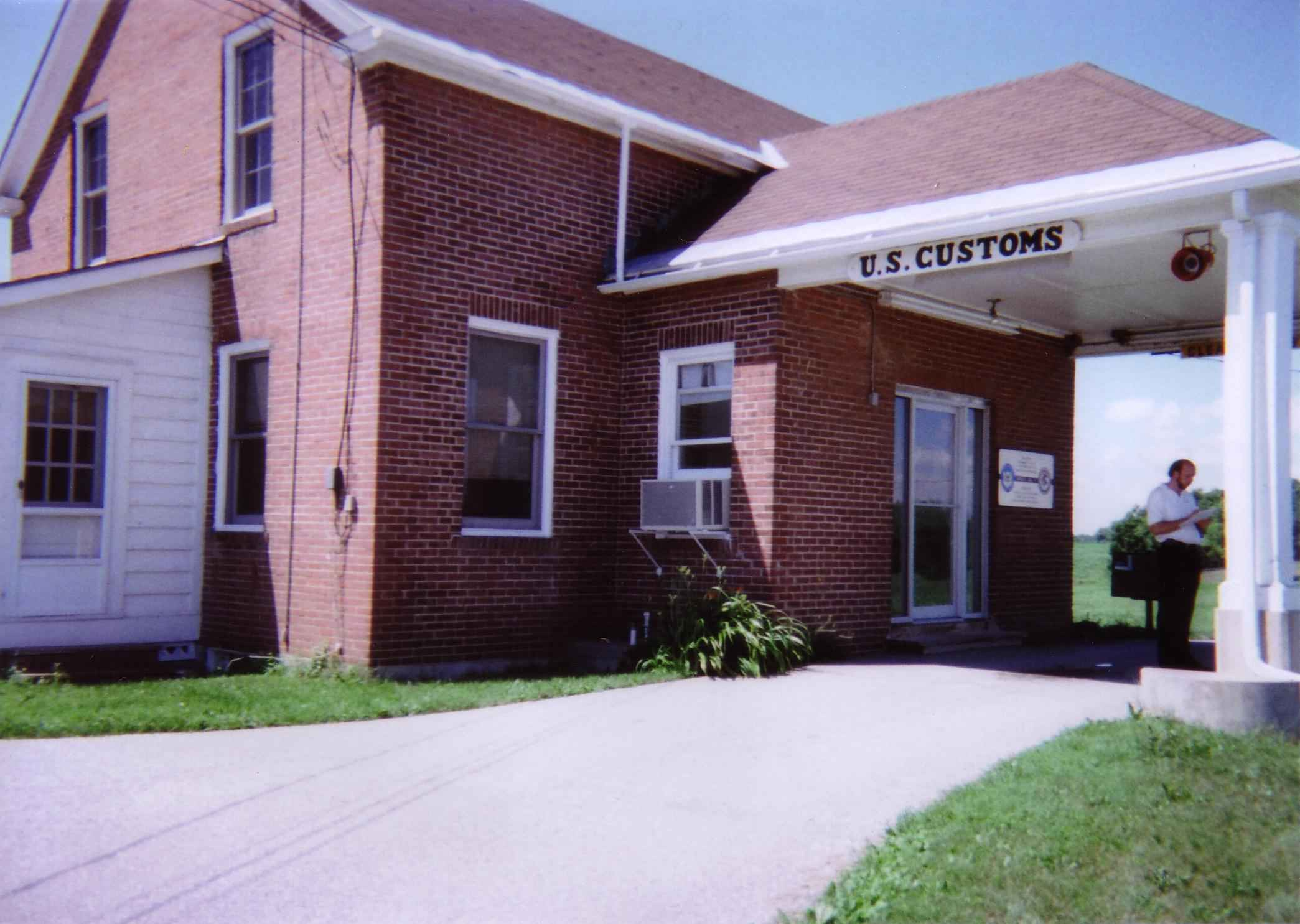
- US Border Inspection Station at Morses Line, Vermont

Location
- Country: United States; Canada
- Location: VT 235 / R-235; US Port: 4475 Morses Line Road Franklin, Vermont 05457; Canadian Port: 10 Dutch Road, Saint-Armand, Quebec J0J 1T0
- Coordinates: 45.014453°N 72.978058°W

Details
- Opened: 1934

Website
- http://www.cbp.gov/xp/cgov/toolbox/contacts/ports/vt/0212.xml

The Morses Line Border Crossing connects the towns of Saint-Armand, Quebec with Franklin, Vermont on the Canada–US border. It is reached by Vermont Route 235 on the American side and by Quebec Route 235 on the Canadian side.

In 1871, a proprietor named J. Morse opened a store at this location directly on the US-Canada boundary. A small village grew around it on both sides of the border. In 1934, the US built a border inspection station at Morses Line, and Canada built a new border station in 1952. Canada replaced its border station in 2015. The original 1934 US border station remains in use, and of all the 163 US land border inspection stations, it is the oldest one still in operation.

The crossing is among the least busy of the 15 in Vermont, with about 80 cars using it a day. It is five miles east of Highgate Springs–St. Armand/Philipsburg Border Crossing, the busiest in the state. Residents living near Morses Line have long fought the US and Canadian governments' attempts to make changes in the facilities and operations. In 1997, in an effort to offer local residents the opportunity to cross the border even after the crossing had closed for the night, the governments of the US and Canada committed to providing a Remote Video Inspection System. At a town hall meeting in Franklin, Vermont many residents raised objections, so installation of that system was halted. Then in 2009, the US Government planned to construct a new border station, a project that involved purchasing some land from an adjacent farm. The property owner refused to sell the land, and furthermore urged the government to close the crossing, stating that its existence was a waste of taxpayer money. In response, the Department of Homeland Security announced it would close the crossing. Eventually, other local residents began to recognize what the loss of the border crossing would mean to their economy and way of life, and fought to keep it open.

In January 2016, CBSA succeeded in establishing a Remote Traveler Processing system, which enables travelers entering Canada to be remotely inspected when the border station is closed for the night. Canada also constructed a new border inspection station as part of this pilot program, suggesting that even if the remote inspection pilot is deemed unsuccessful, the crossing will remain open.

== See also ==
- List of Canada–United States border crossings
- Morses Line, Vermont
