= Quebec Route 235 =

Highway in Quebec, Canada

Route 235

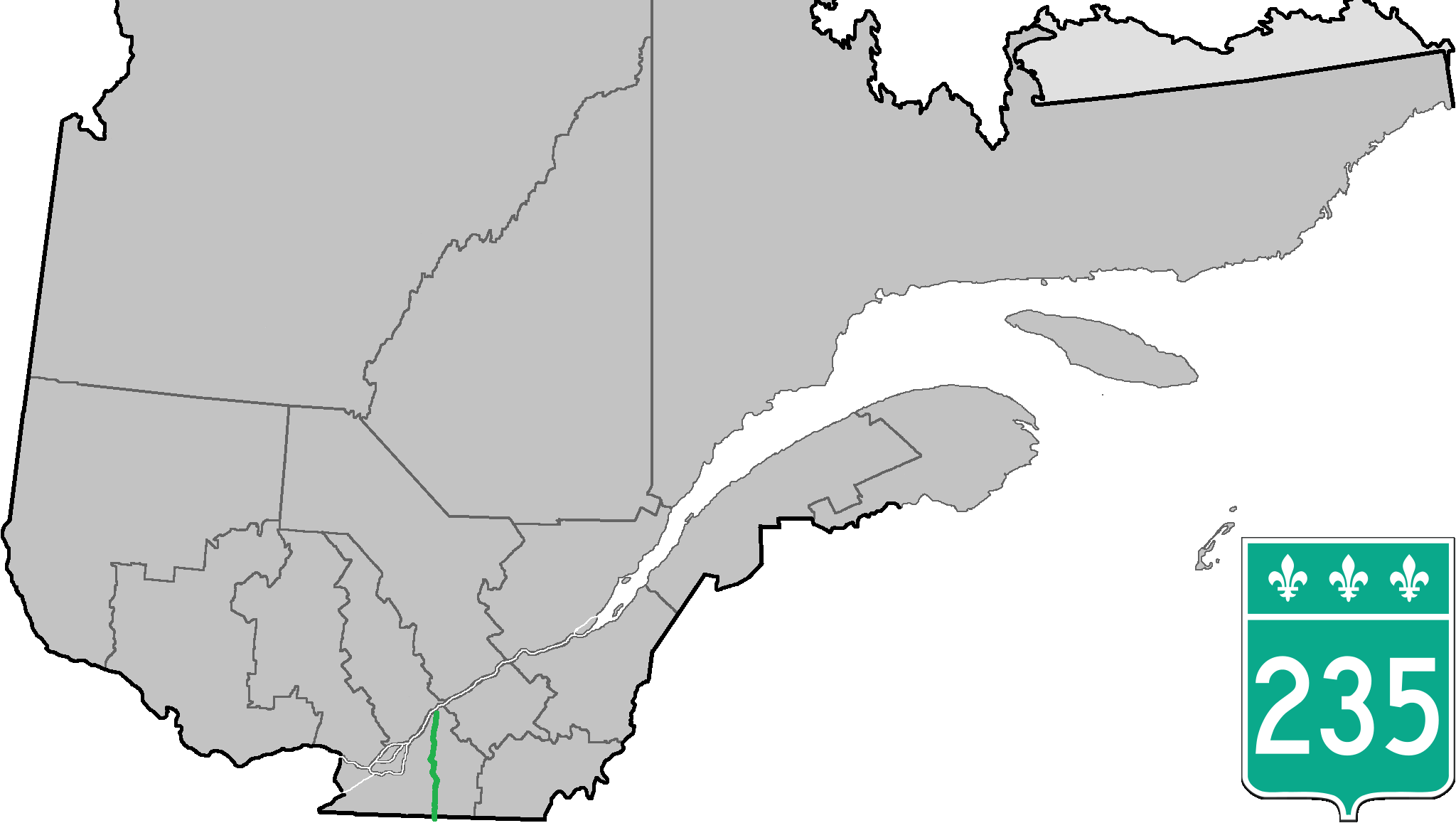

Route information
- Maintained by Transports Québec
- Length: 131.0 km (81.4 mi)

Major junctions
- South end: VT 235 at the U.S. border near Saint-Armand
- R-202 in Bedford (town); R-104 / A-6 in Farnham; A-10 in Ange-Gardien; R-112 in Abbottsford; A-20 (TCH) / R-116 / R-137 in Saint-Hyacinthe; R-239 in Massueville
- North end: R-132 in Yamaska

Location
- Country: Canada
- Province: Quebec

Highway system
- Quebec provincial highways; Autoroutes; List; Former
← R-234	→ R-236

Route 235 is a Quebec provincial highway located in the Estrie and Montérégie regions in the southeastern part of the province. The highway runs from the Morses Line Border Crossing at the Canada-United States border in Saint-Armand to Yamaska. It overlaps Route 239 in Massueville and Route 137 and Route 116 in Saint-Hyacinthe, Quebec. A small portion of the highway near its northern terminus runs parallel to the Yamaska River.

== Municipalities along Route 235 ==
- Saint-Armand
- Bedford
- Sainte-Sabine
- Farnham
- Ange-Gardien
- Saint-Paul-d'Abbotsford
- Saint-Pie
- Saint-Hyacinthe
- Saint-Barnabé-Sud
- Saint-Jude
- Saint-Louis
- Massueville
- Saint-Aimé
- Yamaska

== See also ==
- List of Quebec provincial highways
