= Swanton (village), Vermont =

Swanton, Vermont
- Village
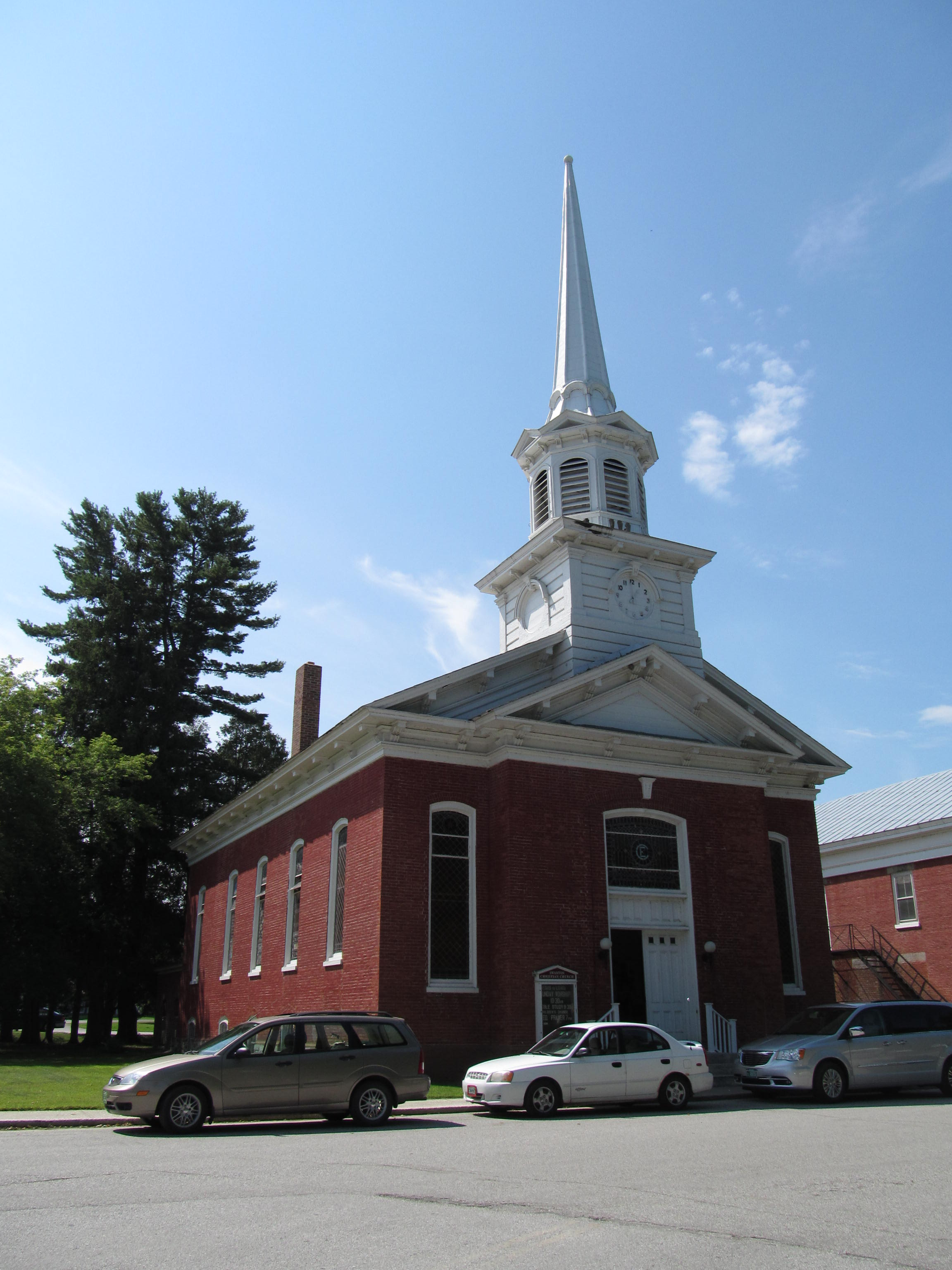
- Swanton Christian Church

- Seal

- Location in Franklin County and the state of Vermont
- Coordinates: 44°55′16″N 73°07′28″W
- Country: United States
- State: Vermont
- County: Franklin
- Town: Swanton

Area
  - Total: 0.79 sq mi (2.05 km^{2})
  - Land: 0.76 sq mi (1.97 km^{2})
  - Water: 0.031 sq mi (0.08 km^{2})
- Elevation: 151 ft (46 m)

Population (2020)
  - Total: 2,328
  - Density: 3,060/sq mi (1,180/km^{2})
- Time zone: UTC-5 (Eastern (EST))
  - Summer (DST): UTC-4 (EDT)
- ZIP code: 05488
- Area code: 802
- FIPS code: 50-71650
- GNIS feature ID: 2378328
- Website: swantonvt.gov/village

Swanton is a village in the town of Swanton in Franklin County, Vermont, United States. It is sometimes called Swanton Village to distinguish it from the surrounding town of the same name. The population was 2,328 at the 2020 census. It was founded in 1888.

== Geography ==
Swanton village is located in the north-central part of the town of Swanton, along the Missisquoi River. U.S. Route 7 passes through the village as Grand Avenue, Canada Street, and Spring Street. To the north US 7 leads 7 miles (11 km) to its northern terminus at Interstate 89 just south of the Canada–United States border, and to the south it leads 8.5 miles (13.7 km) to St. Albans, the Franklin County seat. Interstate 89 passes just east of Swanton village, with access from Exit 21 (Vermont Route 78). I-89 leads north to the Canada–US border and south 36 miles (58 km) to the Burlington area. Vermont Route 78 passes through the village on First Street, Grand Avenue, Depot Street, and North River Street, leading east 4.5 miles (7.2 km) to Highgate Center and west 10 miles (16 km) to Alburgh on Grand Isle in Lake Champlain. Vermont Route 36 leads west from Swanton village as Lake Street 2 miles (3 km) to the shore of Lake Champlain at Maquam Bay, then south along the lakeshore 8 miles (13 km) to St. Albans Bay.

According to the United States Census Bureau, the village of Swanton has a total area of 0.79 square miles (2.05 km^{2}), of which 0.76 square miles (1.97 km^{2}) is land and 0.03 square miles (0.08 km^{2}), or 4.05%, is water.

== Demographics ==
Historical population
Census	Pop.	Note	%±
1880	1,200		—
1890	1,878		56.5%
1900	1,168		−37.8%
1910	1,236		5.8%
1920	1,371		10.9%
1930	1,558		13.6%
1940	1,461		−6.2%
1950	2,275		55.7%
1960	2,390		5.1%
1970	2,630		10.0%
1980	2,520		−4.2%
1990	2,360		−6.3%
2000	2,548		8.0%
2010	2,386		−6.4%
2020	2,328		−2.4%
U.S. Decennial Census

At the 2020 US census, there were 2,328 people, 987 households, and 398 families residing in the village. the population density was 3,060 people per square mile (1,833.07/km^{2}). There were 1,067 housing units at an average density of 1,350.6/sq mi (839.2/km^{2}). The racial makeup of the village was 87.9% White, 0.4% Black or African American, 2.9% Native American, 0.2% Asian, 0.27% from other races, and 8.3% from two or more races. Hispanic or Latino of any race were 1.2% of the population.

In the census of 2000, there were 2,548 people, 1,031 households, and 680 families residing in the village. The population density was 3,358.3 people per square mile (1,294.5/km^{2}). There were 1,064 housing units at an average density of 1,402.4/sq mi (540.5/km^{2}). The racial makeup of the village was 91.25% White, 0.35% Black or African American, 4.32% Native American, 0.98% Asian, 0.27% from other races, and 2.83% from two or more races. Hispanic or Latino of any race were 0.55% of the population.

There were 1,031 households, out of which 31.0% had children under the age of 18 living with them, 50.5% were married couples living together, 11.7% had a female householder with no husband present, and 34.0% were non-families. 26.6% of all households were made up of individuals, and 13.9% had someone living alone who was 65 years of age or older. The average household size was 2.46 and the average family size was 2.96.

In the village, the population was spread out, with 24.8% under the age of 18, 7.3% from 18 to 24, 29.4% from 25 to 44, 22.0% from 45 to 64, and 16.5% who were 65 years of age or older. The median age was 38 years. For every 100 females, there were 90.0 males. For every 100 females age 18 and over, there were 85.3 males.

The median income for a household in the village was $34,153, and the median income for a family was $41,929. Males had a median income of $31,875 versus $24,800 for females. The per capita income for the village was $17,720. About 8.5% of families and 9.7% of the population were below the poverty line, including 12.6% of those under age 18 and 7.8% of those age 65 or over.

== Government ==
The village of Swanton is governed by a board of trustees elected by village residents to staggered terms of three years each. The village president is the presiding officer of all village meetings of the board of trustees and is elected by village residents to a one-year term. The village clerk/treasurer is also elected to a one-year term.

=== Village officers ===
- Village President: Neal Speer (term expires 2024)
- Village Trustee: Eugene Labombard (term expires 2025)
- Village Trustee: Adam Paxman (term expires 2026)
- Village Trustee: Chris Leach (term expires 2024)
- Village Clerk & Treasurer Dianne Day (term expires 2024)

== Education ==
The village is in the Franklin Northwest Supervisory Union school district.

== Notable people ==
- Lou Blonger, confidence man; born in Swanton
- William Brayton, Justice of the Vermont Supreme Court
- Stephen F. Brown, Union Army officer in the American Civil War.
- Donald Collins, member of the Vermont State Senate.
- John R. Edwards, member of the Vermont House of Representatives and US Marshal for Vermont
- James Fisk, Representative from Vermont's 3rd congressional district, United States Senator
- Jerome O'Neill, U.S. Attorney for Vermont
- Brian K. Savage, Assistant Minority Leader of the Vermont House of Representatives.
- Albert M. Skeels, Wisconsin State Assemblyman, born in Swanton.
