= Franklin, Vermont =

- Town
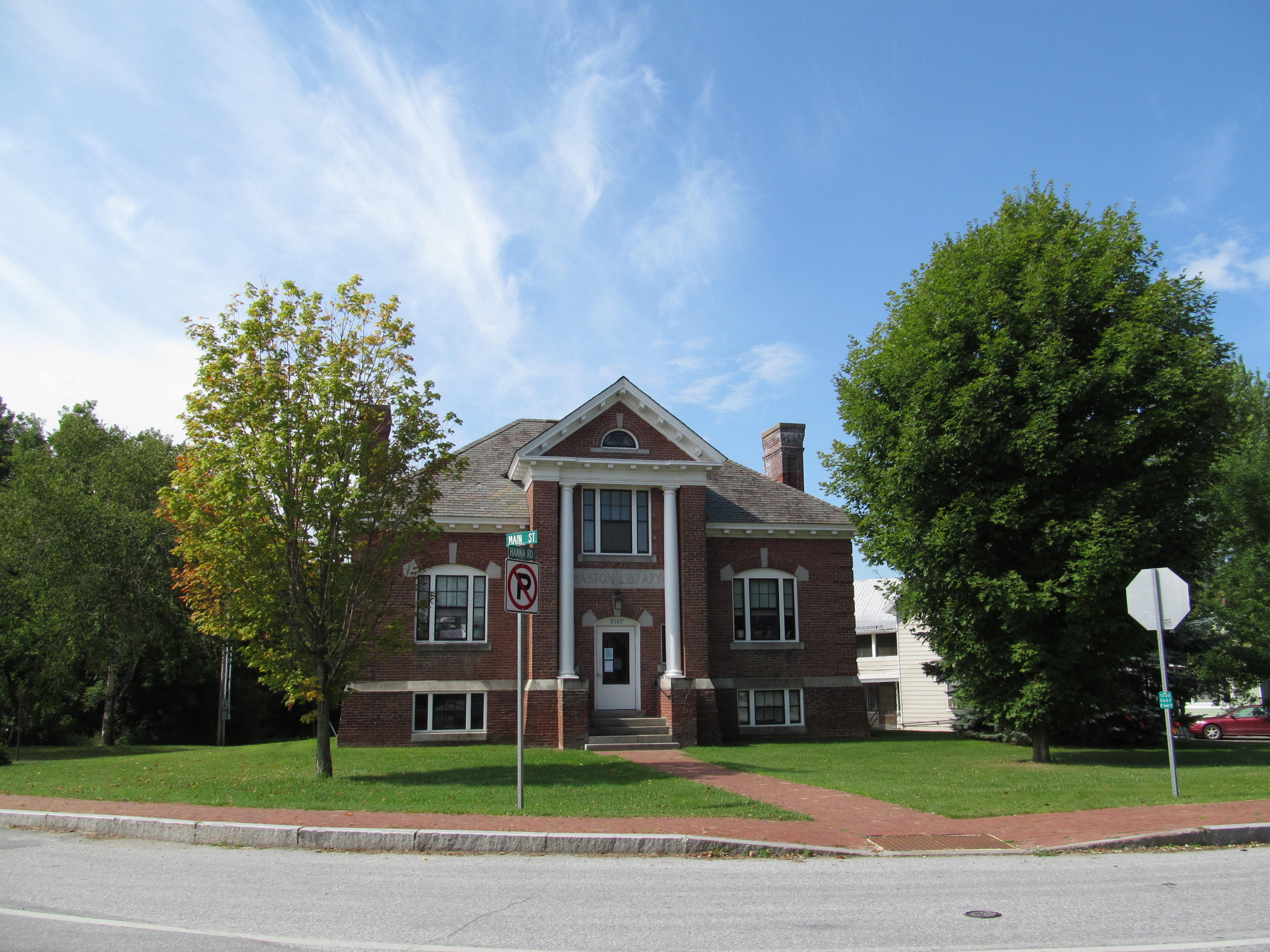
- Street scene in Franklin

- Logo
- Motto: "Home of Lake Carmi"
- Location in Franklin County and the state of Vermont
- Coordinates: 44°58′34″N 72°53′19″W
- Country: United States
- State: Vermont
- County: Franklin
- Communities: Franklin; Browns Corners; East Franklin; Morses Line

Area
  - Total: 40.8 sq mi (105.6 km^{2})
  - Land: 38.4 sq mi (99.4 km^{2})
  - Water: 2.4 sq mi (6.2 km^{2})
- Elevation: 604 ft (184 m)

Population (2020)
  - Total: 1,363
  - Density: 35/sq mi (13.7/km^{2})
- Time zone: UTC-5 (Eastern (EST))
  - Summer (DST): UTC-4 (EDT)
- ZIP Codes: 05457 (Franklin); 05450 (Enosburg Falls)
- Area code: 802
- FIPS code: 50-27100
- GNIS feature ID: 1462100
- Website: www.franklinvermont.org

Franklin is a town in Franklin County, Vermont, United States. The population was 1,363 at the 2020 census. The original name was "Huntsburgh", but the name was changed to "Franklin" in 1817.

== Geography ==
Franklin is located along the northern border of Franklin County, which also is the northern border of Vermont and the Canada–United States border. The main community in town is the hamlet of Franklin near the town center, while East Franklin is on the town's eastern border. Vermont Route 120 passes through the town center, leading south to North Sheldon and east to East Franklin. Vermont Route 235 runs northwest from the center of Franklin to Morses Line at the Canadian border. Vermont Route 236 runs through the eastern part of town, north to East Franklin and south to South Franklin, which however is located in the neighboring town of Sheldon.

According to the United States Census Bureau, the town of Franklin has a total area of 40.8 square miles (105.6 km^{2}), of which 38.4 square miles (99.4 km^{2}) is land and 2.4 square miles (6.2 km^{2}), or 5.84%, is water. Lake Carmi occupies the eastern part of the town, with Lake Carmi State Park on the southeast shore. The lake drains from its northeast end to the Pike River, which flows north and west through Quebec to Missisquoi Bay on Lake Champlain. The Rock River flows through the western part of the town, also to Missisquoi Bay.

== Demographics ==
Historical population
Census	Pop.	Note	%±
1790	46		—
1800	280		508.7%
1810	714		155.0%
1820	631		−11.6%
1830	1,129		78.9%
1840	1,410		24.9%
1850	1,646		16.7%
1860	1,781		8.2%
1870	1,612		−9.5%
1880	1,439		−10.7%
1890	1,300		−9.7%
1900	1,145		−11.9%
1910	1,108		−3.2%
1920	994		−10.3%
1930	1,001		0.7%
1940	1,021		2.0%
1950	878		−14.0%
1960	796		−9.3%
1970	821		3.1%
1980	1,006		22.5%
1990	1,068		6.2%
2000	1,268		18.7%
2010	1,405		10.8%
2020	1,363		−3.0%
U.S. Decennial Census

As of the census of 2000, there were 1,268 people, 429 households, and 343 families residing in the town. The population density was 32.8 people per square mile (12.7/km^{2}). There were 736 housing units at an average density of 19.1 per square mile (7.4/km^{2}). The racial makeup of the town was 96.29% White, 0.16% African American, 1.81% Native American, 0.24% Asian, 0.08% Pacific Islander, and 1.42% from two or more races. Hispanic or Latino of any race were 0.08% of the population.

There were 429 households, out of which 42.0% had children under the age of 18 living with them, 66.4% were married couples living together, 8.2% had a female householder with no husband present, and 20.0% were non-families. 15.2% of all households were made up of individuals, and 4.7% had someone living alone who was 65 years of age or older. The average household size was 2.90 and the average family size was 3.17.

In the town, the population was spread out, with 29.6% under the age of 18, 6.4% from 18 to 24, 30.5% from 25 to 44, 22.4% from 45 to 64, and 11.1% who were 65 years of age or older. The median age was 36 years. For every 100 females, there were 101.9 males. For every 100 females age 18 and over, there were 101.6 males.

The median income for a household in the town was $39,926, and the median income for a family was $40,156. Males had a median income of $27,589 versus $21,776 for females. The per capita income for the town was $17,222. About 3.7% of families and 5.5% of the population were below the poverty line, including 5.8% of those under age 18 and 5.3% of those age 65 or over.

== Education ==
It is in the Franklin Northwest Supervisory Union school district.

== Notable people ==
- Havilah Babcock, Wisconsin businessman
- Orville E. Babcock, Civil War era general and private secretary under President Grant
- Moses Ransom Doyon, mayor of Madison, Wisconsin
- Charles W. Gates, 55th governor of Vermont
- Lemuel Roberts, Revolutionary War soldier and author
- Seth Wakeman, former US congressman
