= List of rivers of Vermont =

This is a list of rivers in the U.S. state of Vermont, sorted by drainage basin, and ordered from lower to higher, with the towns at their mouths:

== Connecticut River ==
The Connecticut River flows south towards Long Island Sound in Connecticut. Flowing into it are:

- Deerfield River, Greenfield, Massachusetts
  - Green River, Greenfield, Massachusetts
  - Glastenbury River, Somerset
- Fall River, Greenfield, Massachusetts
- Whetstone Brook, Brattleboro, Vermont
- West River, Brattleboro
  - Rock River, Newfane
  - Wardsboro Brook, Jamaica
  - Winhall River, Londonderry
  - Utley Brook, Londonderry
- Saxtons River, Westminster
- Williams River, Rockingham
  - Middle Branch Williams River, Chester
  - South Branch Williams River
- Black River, Springfield
- Mill Brook, Windsor
- Ottauquechee River, Hartland
  - Barnard Brook, Woodstock
  - Broad Brook, Bridgewater
  - North Branch Ottauquechee River, Bridgewater
- White River, White River Junction
  - First Branch White River, South Royalton
  - Second Branch White River, North Royalton
  - Third Branch White River, Bethel
  - Tweed River, Stockbridge
  - West Branch White River, Rochester
- Ompompanoosuc River, Norwich
  - West Branch Ompompanoosuc River, Thetford
- Waits River, Bradford
  - South Branch Waits River, Bradford
- Wells River, Wells River
- Stevens River, Barnet
- Passumpsic River, Barnet
  - Joes Brook, Barnet
  - Sleepers River, St. Johnsbury
  - Moose River, St. Johnsbury
  - Miller Run, Lyndonville
  - Sutton River, West Burke
- Paul Stream, Brunswick
- Nulhegan River, Bloomfield
- Leach Creek, Canaan
- Halls Stream, Beecher Falls

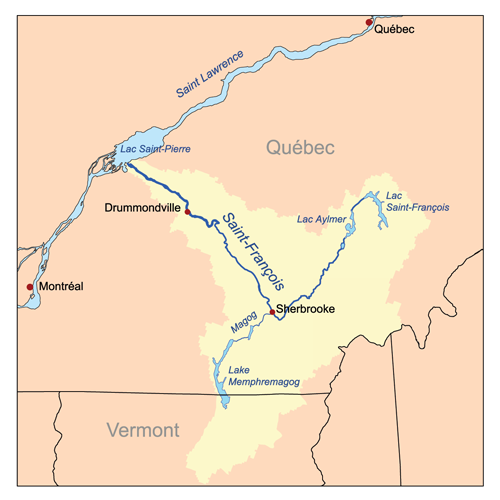
Saint-François River watershed

== Saint-François River ==
=== Lake Memphremagog ===
Lake Memphremagog drains north via the Magog River in Quebec to the Saint-François River at Sherbrooke. Flowing into the lake are:

- Johns River, Derby
- Clyde River, Newport
  - Pherrins River, Island Pond
- Black River, Newport
  - Fairfield River, Fairfield
- Barton River, Newport
  - Willoughby River, Orleans
    - Brownington Branch, Brownington

=== Massawippi River ===
- Coaticook River, Sherbrooke, Quebec
- The Tomifobia River, which straddles the Vermont-Quebec border for a few kilometers near the village of Stanstead, Quebec and eventually drains north.

Richelieu River watershed

== Lake Champlain ==
Lake Champlain drains into the Richelieu River in Québec, thence into the Saint Lawrence River, and into the Gulf of Saint Lawrence.

- Pike River, Venise-en-Québec, Québec
- Rock River, Highgate
- Missisquoi River, Swanton
  - Sutton River (Missisquoi River)
  - Brock River (Missisquoi River)
  - Missisquoi River North
    - Petite rivière Missisquoi Nord
  - East Branch Missisquoi River
  - Burgess Branch
  - Black Creek, Sheldon
  - Trout River, Berkshire
    - South Branch Trout River
  - Tyler Branch, Sheldon
- Mill River, Georgia
- Lamoille River, Milton
  - Browns River, Fairfax
    - Lee River, Jericho
  - Seymour River, Cambridge
  - Brewster River, Jeffersonville
  - North Branch Lamoille River, Cambridge
  - Gihon River, Johnson
  - Green River, Wolcott
- Winooski River, Colchester/Burlington
  - Huntington River, Richmond
  - Little River, Waterbury
  - Mad River, Middlesex
  - Dog River, Montpelier
  - North Branch Winooski River, Montpelier
  - Stevens Branch, Montpelier
  - Kingsbury Branch, East Montpelier
    - Jail Branch River, Barre
- La Platte River, Shelburne
- Lewis Creek, Ferrisburg
- Little Otter Creek, Ferrisburg
- Otter Creek, Ferrisburg
  - Lemon Fair River, Weybridge
    - Little Lemon Fair River, Orwell
  - Dead Creek, Addison
  - New Haven River, Weybridge
  - Middlebury River, Middlebury
  - Leicester River, Leicester
  - Neshobe River, Brandon
  - Clarendon River, Rutland
  - East Creek, Rutland
  - Cold River, Clarendon
  - Mill River, Clarendon
- Mettawee River, West Haven, Vermont/Whitehall, New York
  - Indian River, Granville
- Poultney River, West Haven, Vermont/Whitehall, New York
  - Hubbardton River, West Haven
  - Castleton River, Fair Haven

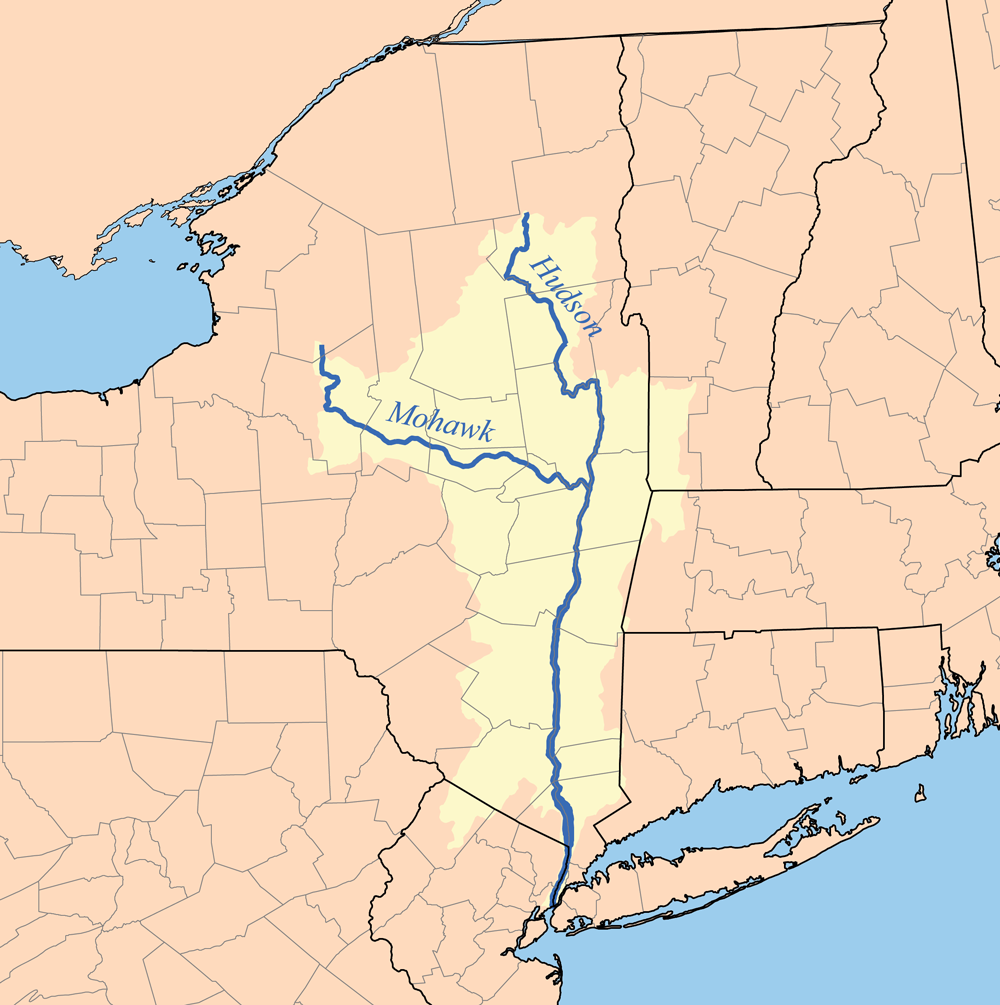
Hudson River watershed

== Hudson River ==
The Hudson River in New York drains into New York Bay.

- Hoosic River, Schaghticoke, New York
  - Walloomsac River, Hoosick, New York
    - Roaring Branch, Bennington
- Batten Kill, Greenwich, New York
  - Green River, West Arlington
  - Roaring Branch, Arlington

== See also ==
- List of rivers of the United States
