= Burgess Branch =

Location
- Country: United States
- State: Vermont
- Counties: Lamoille County; Orleans County
- Towns: Eden; Lowell

Physical characteristics
- Source: Little Lake
  - location: Eden
  - coordinates: 44.751°N 72.525°W
  - elevation: 373 m (1,224 ft)
- Mouth: Missisquoi River
  - location: Lowell
  - coordinates: 44.806°N 72.460°W
  - elevation: 247 m (810 ft)
- Length: 10.6 km (6.6 mi)

Basin features
- Progression: Missisquoi River, Lake Champlain (via Missisquoi Bay), Richelieu River, Saint Lawrence River
- Tributaries
  - left: Lockwood Brook

The Burgess Branch is a tributary of the Missisquoi River, crossing the municipalities of Eden (Lamoille County) and Lowell in Orleans County, Vermont, United States.

The lower part of the Burgess Branch is accessible by Valley Road (south-east side of the river); the intermediary part, by Lamphere Road (mainly on south-east side); the upper part is served mainly by Mines Road.

The surface of the Burgess Branch is usually frozen from mid-December to mid-March, except the rapids areas; however, safe circulation on the ice is generally from late December to early March.

== Geography ==
The Burgess Branch takes its source at the mouth of a little lake (altitude: 373 metres (1,224 ft)) in the municipality of Eden. This lake is encased between Knob Mountain (on south side - summit reach 521 m (1,709 ft)), Hadley Mountain (north-east side - summit reach 752 m (2,467 ft)) and Belvidere Mountain (north-west side - summit reach 1,018 m (3,340 ft)). This source of the river is located at:

- 1.1 km (0.68 mi) south of the limited between Lamoille County and Orleans County, Vermont;
- 3.4 km (2.1 mi) north-west of Lake Eden.

From its source, the Burgess Branch flows over 10.6 kilometres (6.6 mi), with a drop of 126 metres (413 ft), according to the following segments:

- 1.2 km (0.75 mi) towards the north by crossing successively an unidentified lake (length: 0.24 km (0.15 mi); altitude: 367 m (1,204 ft)), a little lake which receives the discharge (coming from the south-east) from an unidentified stream, then the Corez Pond (length: 4.3 km (2.7 mi); altitude: 363 m (1,191 ft)), to its mouth. Note: The mouth of Corez Pond corresponds to the limit between Lamoille County and Orleans County, Vermont;
- 1.0 km (0.62 mi) north at first in an encased valley, then crossing a plain, to the discharge (coming from west) of an unidentified lake;
- 1.6 km (0.99 mi) north, then branching north-east in encased valley, receiving the discharge (coming from the north-west) of two unidentified brook, and crossing a march area, up to the discharge of Lockwood Brook (coming from north-west);
- 1.2 km (0.75 mi) north-east, up to a brook (coming from south-east);
- 1.5 km (0.93 mi) north-east in encased valley, forming a little loop toward east, up to a brook (coming from north-west);
- 4.1 km (2.5 mi) north-east in encased valley, crossing Hazens Notch Road, up to its mouth.

The Burgess Branch empties into the Missisquoi River, at the route 58 bridge. This point is the head of Missisquoi River.

The mouth of the Burgess Branch is located at:

- 1.3 km (0.81 mi) north-west of the center of Lowell, Vermont;
- 22.9 km (14.2 mi) south of the Canada-US border;
- 54.3 km (33.7 mi) east of lake Champlain.

== Toponymy ==
The toponym "Burgess Branch" was registered on October 29, 1980, in the USGS (US Geological Survey).

== See also ==
- List of rivers of Vermont
