= Lowell (CDP), Vermont =

Census-designated place in Vermont, United States

Lowell, Vermont
- Census-designated place
- Location within Vermont Location within the United States
- Coordinates: 44°47′43″N 72°26′41″W
- Country: United States
- State: Vermont
- County: Orleans
- Town: Lowell

Area
  - Total: 2.93 sq mi (7.60 km^{2})
  - Land: 2.93 sq mi (7.58 km^{2})
  - Water: 0.0039 sq mi (0.01 km^{2})
- Elevation: 935 ft (285 m)

Population (2020)
  - Total: 254
- Time zone: UTC-5 (Eastern (EST))
  - Summer (DST): UTC-4 (EDT)
- ZIP Code: 05847
- Area code: 802
- FIPS code: 50-40450
- GNIS feature ID: 2586642

Lowell is the primary village and a census-designated place (CDP) in the town of Lowell, Orleans County, Vermont, United States. As of the 2020 census, it had a population of 254, out of 887 in the entire town of Lowell.

== Geography ==
The CDP is in western Orleans County, at the geographic center of the town. It is in the valley of the East Branch of the Missisquoi River, which joins the Burgess Branch at the north end of the village to become the main stem of the Missisquoi, which flows north and then west to Lake Champlain.

Vermont Route 100 passes through the village center, leading north 8 miles (13 km) to Troy village and southwest 19 miles (31 km) to Hyde Park. Vermont Route 58 crosses Route 100 at the village center, leading east 9 miles (14 km) to Irasburg and northwest over Hazens Notch 10 miles (16 km) to Montgomery Center.
