= East Branch Missisquoi River =

Location
- Country: United States
- State: Vermont
- County: Lamoille County; Orleans County, Vermont
- Cities: Eden, Vermont, Lowell, Vermont

Physical characteristics
- Source: Mountain Brook
  - location: Eden
  - coordinates: 44.73962°N 72.44928°W
  - elevation: 810 m (2,660 ft)
- Mouth: Missisquoi River
  - location: Lowell
  - coordinates: 44.80610°N 72.45934°W
  - elevation: 247 m (810 ft)
- Length: 10.1 km (6.3 mi)

Basin features
- Progression: Missisquoi River, Lake Champlain (via Missisquoi Bay), Richelieu River, Saint Lawrence River
- Tributaries
  - right: (upstream) Truland Brook, Ace Brook.

The East Branch of the Missisquoi River (Français: Branche Est de la rivière Missisquoi) is a tributary of the Missisquoi River, crossing the municipalities of Eden (Lamoille County) and Lowell, Vermont (Orleans County, Vermont, in the state of Vermont, in United States.

Most of the eastern branch of the Missisquoi River is accessible by route 100 (Vermont) which descends this valley; the lower part is served by route 58 (Vermont).

The surface of the East Branch of the Missisquoi River is usually frozen from mid-December to mid-March, except the rapids areas; however, safe circulation on the ice is generally from late December to early March.

== Geography ==
The eastern branch of the Missisquoi River takes its source on the mountainside (altitude: 625 metres (2,051 ft)) on the northwest side of the Lowell Mountains whose summit reaches 775 metres (2,543 ft), in the municipality of Eden. This source of the river is located at:

- 6.6 kilometres (4.1 mi) south of the village center of Lowell, Vermont;
- 35.0 kilometres (21.7 mi) east of lac Champlain.

From its source, the eastern branch of the Missisquoi River flows over 10.1 kilometres (6.3 mi), with a drop of 580 metres (1,900 ft), according to the following segments:

- 1.9 kilometres (1.2 mi) towards the northwest by forming two curves towards the west and curving towards the north, up to route 100;
- 3.8 kilometres (2.4 mi) north along more or less route 100, cutting Cheney Road and bending northeast at the end of the segment, until Ace Brook (coming from the south-east);
- 3.5 kilometres (2.2 mi) northerly passing on the east side of Leland Hill and crossing the Lower Village Road, until route 58 (Hazen Notch Road), i.e. on the west side of the village center of Lowell;
- 0.9 kilometres (0.56 mi) north-west along route 58, up to its mouth.

The East Branch of the Missisquoi River empties into a river elbow of the south-est shore of the Missisquoi River.

The mouth of the East Branch of the Missisquoi River is located at:

- 0.8 kilometres (0.50 mi) north-west of the center of Lowell, Vermont;
- 14.7 kilometres (9.1 mi) south of the Canada-US border;
- 34.3 kilometres (21.3 mi) east of lake Champlain.

== Toponymy ==
The toponym "East Branch Missisquoi River" was registered on October 29, 1980 in the USGS (US Geological Survey).

== See also ==
- Lamoille County
- Orleans County, Vermont
- Eden, Vermont, a municipality
- Lowell, Vermont, a municipality
- Burgess Branch, a stream
- Missisquoi River, a stream
- List of rivers of Vermont
