= Missisquoi River =

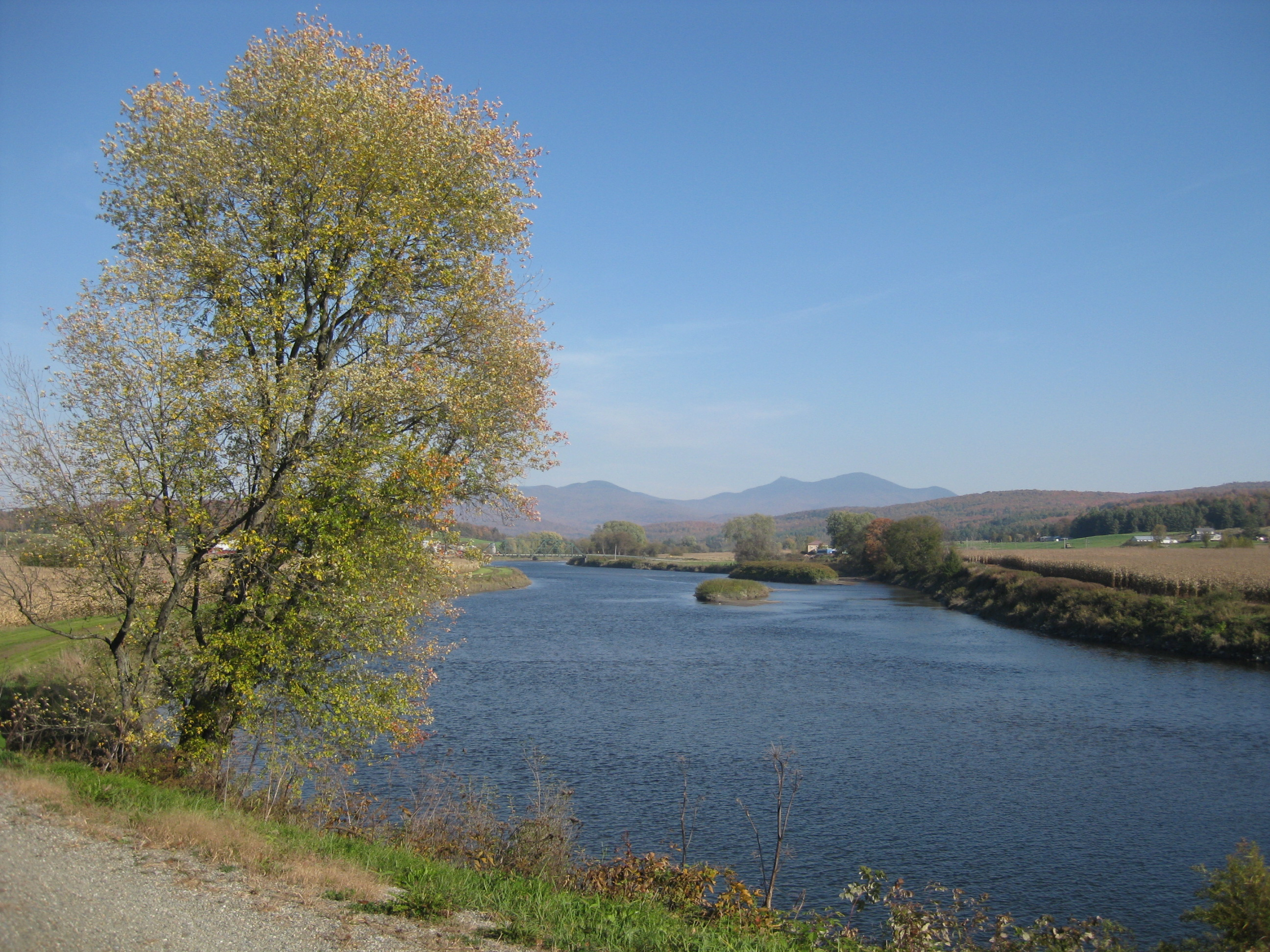

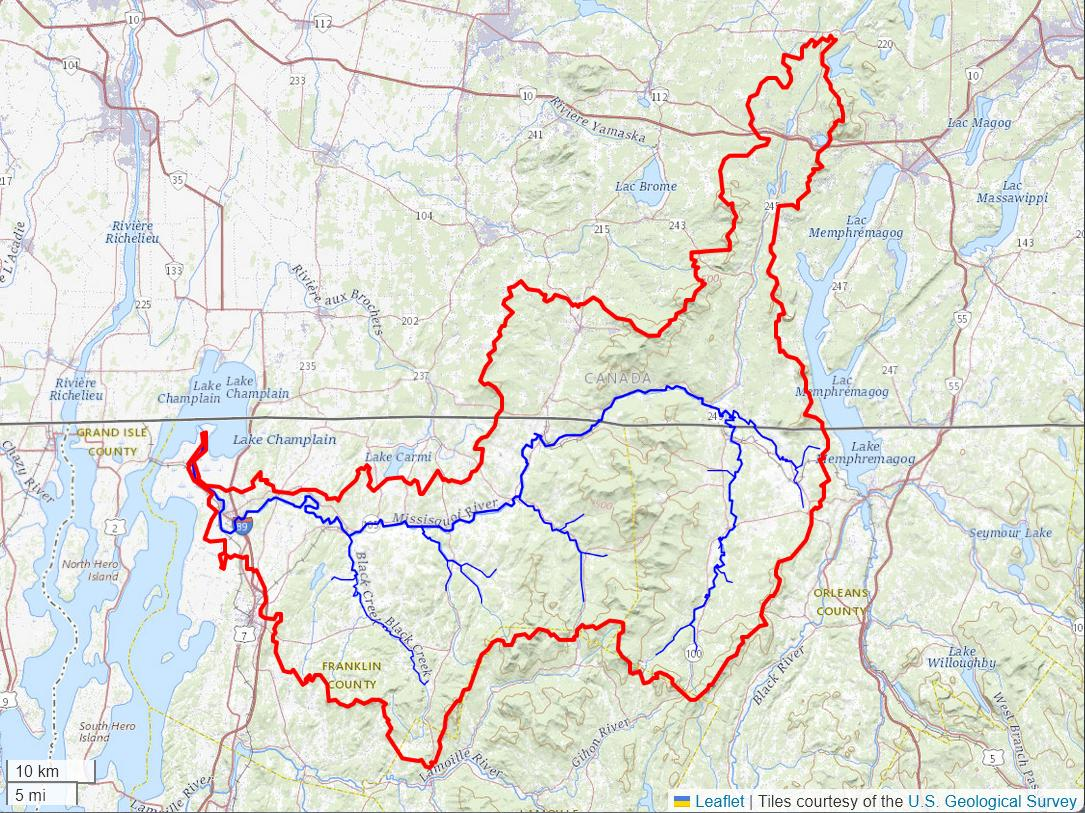
- Map of the Missisquoi River Watershed

Location
- Country: Canada; United States
- Province State: Quebec; Vermont
- Administrative region County: Estrie (Canada); Orleans County, Vermont
- RCM (Canada): Memphrémagog Regional County Municipality

Physical characteristics
- Source: Confluence of Burgess Branch and East Missisquoi Branch
  - location: Lowell
  - coordinates: 44.807°N 72.459°W
  - elevation: 247
- Mouth: Lake Champlain (Missisquoi Bay)
  - location: Highgate, Vermont
  - coordinates: 44.996°N 73.149°W
  - elevation: 29 m (95 ft)
- Length: 130 km (81 mi)
- Discharge
  - location: Swanton, Vermont
  - average: 51.36 cubic metres (1,814 cu ft)

Basin features
- Progression: Lake Champlain (via Missisquoi Bay), Richelieu River, Saint Lawrence River
- Tributaries
  - left: (upstream) lower US course: 3 unidentified brooks, Hungerford Brook, 5 unidentified brooks, Black Creek, Morrow Brook, Goodsell Brook, Tyler Branch, 4 unidentified brooks, Trout River, discharge of Guillmettes Pond, Loveland Brook, Whittaker Brook, Stanhope Brook, Mountain Brook, Lucas Brook; Canadian course: Loveland Brook, Mountain Brook, Leavitt Brook, Dufour Brook; Upper US course: Jay Branch, Buybee Brook, Coburn Brook, Taft Brook, discharge of McAllister Pond, Burgess Branch.
  - right: (upstream) lower US course: Dead Creek, Kelly Brook, unidentified brook, McGowan Brook, 4 unidentified brooks, Giddings Brook, Trout Brook, 8 unidentified brooks, North Branch Missisquoi River (i.e. US segment; the Canadian segment is named Sutton River), 7 unidentified brooks; Canadian course: Davis Creek, Courser Creek, Brock River, Ruiter Creek, Missisquoi River North, Mud Creek; Upper US course: Beetle Brook, Lilly Brook, Mineral Spring Brook, East Missisquoi Branch.

National Wild and Scenic River
- Type: Recreational
- Designated: December 19, 2014

The Missisquoi River is a transboundary river of the east shore of Lake Champlain (via Missisquoi Bay), approximately 80 miles (130 km) long, in northern Vermont in the United States and southern Quebec in Canada.

It drains a rural area of the northern Green Mountains along the Canada–US border northeast of Lake Champlain, and an area of Quebec's Eastern Townships. The South Branch rises in Vermont and runs generally from southeast to northwest; the North Branch rises in Lake d'Argent in Eastman, Quebec, and runs from north to south. The North Branch and the South Branch join at Highwater, Quebec, just downriver from North Troy, Vermont. The river then runs in Quebec for approximately 15 miles (24 km), re-entering Vermont at Richford and thence to Lake Champlain's Missisquoi Bay.

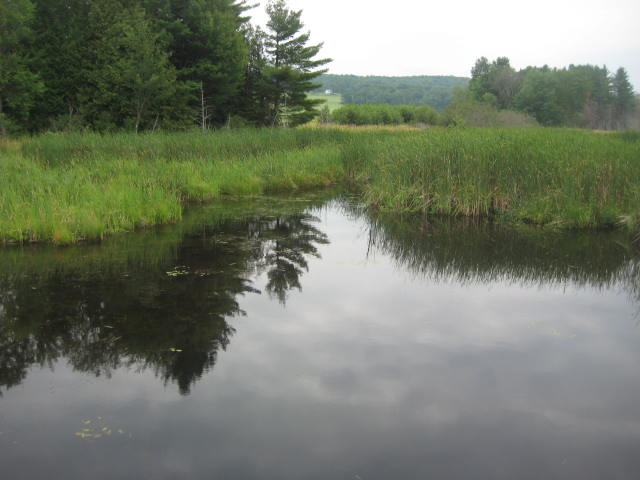
Fairfield Swamp (Vermont), Black Creek tributary of the Missisquoi

== Etymology ==
According to US Natural Resources Conservation Service, Missisquoi Soil – Missisquoi is derived from the Abenaki word masipskoik, which means "where there is flint" or "where flint is". The name originates from an Abenaki chert quarry located near Missisquoi Bay on Lake Champlain.

However, according to the Commission de toponymie du Québec (Quebec board of place names), the term missisquoi in Abenaki means "multitudes of water birds", which takes on this river all its meaning. The traditional indigenous variant of this toponym is "Wazowategok", meaning "to the river that turns around".

The toponym "Rivière Missisquoi" was formalized on December 5, 1968, at the Commission de toponymie du Québec.

== Course ==
The Missisquoi River rises in western Orleans County, Vermont, northwest of Lowell, Vermont, at an altitude of 247 metres (810 ft). This source is located next to Route 58 and adjacent to Belvidere Mountain. This source proves to be the continuity of the Burgess Branch (coming from the southwest).

From its source, the Missisquoi River flows over 117.3 kilometres (72.9 mi), with a drop of 218 metres (715 ft), according to the following segments:

Upper course (in Vermont) (segment of 34.7 kilometres (21.6 mi), with a drop of 87 metres (285 ft))

- 1.1 kilometres (0.68 mi) towards the north-east, by collecting the East Branch Missisquoi River (coming from the south-east), then by forming a hook towards the north-west and branches off towards the west at the end of the segment, up to the McAllister Pond outlet (coming from the northwest);
- 3.1 kilometres (1.9 mi) first towards the north, then towards the north-east by forming a loop towards the north, followed by a mouth towards the south, then curve towards the east, collecting the discharge (coming from the south) from two lakes, to Le Clair Brook (coming from the east);
- 3.2 kilometres (2.0 mi) to the north by collecting the Snider Brook (coming from the northwest) where the course of the river enters the "Missisquoi & Trout Wild and Scenic River", crossing Route 100, to Mineral Spring Brook (coming from the southeast). Note: This natural park formed by numerous marsh areas continues on each side of the Missisquoi River, up to the Canada-US border;
- 9.7 kilometres (6.0 mi) first towards the east, then branching north after having made a loop towards the east, collecting the Lilly Branch (coming from the east) and the Taft Brook ( coming from the southwest), forming a loop towards the northwest, then moving towards the northeast to collect the Beetle Brook (coming from the southeast), up to route 100;
- 6.4 kilometres (4.0 mi) towards the north by collecting a stream (coming from the east), by forming some serpentines and by collecting the Buybee Brook (coming from the west), up to the discharge of Jay Branch (from the west);
- 8.0 kilometres (5.0 mi) towards the north by forming some serpentines, then curving towards the west and finally towards the north, until route 105;
- 3.2 kilometres (2.0 mi) towards the north by cutting the railway, bending towards the east, then branching out towards the west by forming a few streamers along the border, up to the Canada-US border.

In upper course, Missisquoi River flows north past Troy and North Troy, crosses Big Falls State Park and the village of Lowell.

Intermediate course (in Quebec) (segment of 24.1 kilometres (15.0 mi), with a drop of 10 metres (33 ft))

- 7.6 kilometres (4.7 mi) towards the north-west, forming a large detour to collect the Mud stream (coming from the north) and some areas of streamers, passing in front of the village of Highwater where it passes under the road bridge, to the confluence of the Missisquoi River North (coming from the north);
- 7.3 kilometres (4.5 mi) to the west by forming six curves to the north and a loop to the south, collecting the Ruiter stream (coming from the north), up to the Brock River (from the northwest);
- 9.2 kilometres (5.7 mi) to the southwest by collecting the Dufour stream (coming from the south-east), the Courser stream (coming from the northwest) and the Davis stream (coming from the northwest), up to the Canada-US border. Note: In this segment, the river flows through Mansonville, Dunkin and the hamlet of Glen Sutton (Sutton).

Lower course (in Vermont) (segment of 58.5 kilometres (36.4 mi), with a drop of 122 metres (400 ft))

- 15.4 kilometres (9.6 mi) south-west in Franklin County, collecting the discharge (coming from the north) from Lac à Jenne, the Lucas Brook (from the southeast), Mountain Brook (from the southeast), Stanhope Brook (from the southeast), Whittaker Brook (from the south), to the confluence of the North Branch Missisquoi River (designated Sutton River in Quebec) (coming from the north);
- 5.8 kilometres (3.6 mi) to the south collecting the Loveland Brook (coming from the south-east) and the outlet of Guillmettes Pond (coming from the east), to the confluence of the Trout River (coming from the south);
- 15.3 kilometres (9.5 mi) to the southwest by collecting the Trout Brook (coming from the north), the Tyler Branch (coming from the southeast), the Goodsell Brook (coming from the south), the Morrow Brook (from the southeast) to Black Creek (from the south);
- 11.3 kilometres (7.0 mi) westwards bending northwards to Interstate 89;
- 10.7 kilometres (6.6 mi) towards the northwest by forming a loop towards the south to bypass Swanton, until its mouth.

It flows west through northern Franklin County approximately 10 miles (16 km) south of the Canada–US border, past the small communities of Richford, East Berkshire, Enosburg Falls, and Sheldon Springs. On the west side of Interstate 89 in northwestern Franklin County, it turns to the north, passing through Missisquoi National Wildlife Refuge in its lower 5 miles (8.0 km) before entering the south end of Missisquoi Bay, an arm of Lake Champlain that straddles the Canada-Vermont border. In the last segment of 5.6 kilometres (3.5 mi) (i.e. from Dead Creek) in Swanton, the Missisquoi River crosses a large area of marsh located on a peninsula (stretching over 4.2 kilometres (2.6 mi)) westwards and having a width of 7.2 kilometres (4.5 mi)).

== Tributaries ==
Named tributaries in Vermont are: Taft Brook in Westfield, Beetle Brook in Troy, Jay Brook in Jay, Stanhope Brook in Richford, the Trout River in Montgomery, Tyler Branch in Enosburg, Black Creek in Sheldon and Fairfield, and Hungerford Brook in Swanton and Highgate.

== History ==
The Abenaki people used the river as a canoe route between the Lake Champlain drainage and the Saint-François River drainage. The river supports canoe traffic from Lake Champlain to Mansonville, Quebec, where there is a falls. From there, an ancient portage (carrying place) runs 6 miles (9.7 km) to Perkins Landing on Lake Memphremagog. Abenaki groups met seasonally on the bluffs at Eagle Point in Newport, Vermont, to catch and dry whitefish.

The Missisquoi Valley was among the first areas of Southern Quebec's Eastern Townships to be settled by Loyalist refugees, who came upriver from camps on Missisquoi Bay.

In September 2008, the United States House of Representatives approved a bill to study the Missisquoi and Trout rivers for potential designation as Wild and Scenic Rivers. It passed with bipartisan support. River sections under Wild and Scenic designation are as follows:

- 25 miles (40 km) of the upper Missisquoi, Franklin County, including Enosburg, Berkshire and Richford
- 25 miles (40 km) of the upper Missisquoi, Orleans County, including Troy, Westfield, Jay and Lowell
- 20 miles (32 km) of the Trout River, Franklin County, including Berkshire and Montgomery

A Study Committee composed of local appointees and partner organizations has been evaluating the Wild and Scenic Designation of the upper Missisquoi and Trout rivers. The group's mission is to facilitate the transfer of information among the ten communities through which the rivers flow - Berkshire, Town of Enosburgh, Village of Enosburg Falls, Jay, Lowell, Montgomery, Village of North Troy, Richford, Westfield, and the Town of Troy, and evaluate the potential benefits of the Wild & Scenic designation. At the end of the study in 2012, the committee is scheduled to provide an assessment as to whether the rivers fit designation criteria and whether designation is supported, and make recommendations of voluntary strategies for protection of the rivers' resources.

As a result of the National Park Service and Study Committee recommendation, 46.1 miles (74.2 km) of the Missisquoi River and Trout River were added to the National Wild and Scenic River System on December 19, 2014.

== Cross-border valley bridge ==
The Valley Bridge spans the Missisquoi River on a north-west/south-east axis. This bridge is located on the Canada-US border, between the two customs posts.

The northwest part of this bridge is located in the town of Sutton, near the hamlet of Glen Sutton, in Quebec. The other end of the bridge is located in the municipality of Richford, in the state of Vermont in the United States, near the hamlet of East Richford. This bridge serves sector residents and vacationers transiting between Canada and the United States. This triangular metal beam bridge has two spans: one of 16 m and the other of 46.5 meters.

According to a souvenir plaque affixed at each end of the bridge, the manufacturer of the metal superstructure of the Vallée bridge is the American company Pittsburg Des Moines Steel Co. The substructure was built by Cenedella & Compagny, from Milford to Massachusetts. Construction contracts had been awarded in 1929. This bridge has been listed since 1990 in the National Register of Historic Places in the United States. This metal bridge replaces the old concrete bridge destroyed by the November 1927 flood.

== Natural history ==
In 2016, about 60% of males are smallmouth bass bore eggs (androgyny). Pollution from farmland runoff, containing the weedkiller atrazine is a possible suspect.

== See also ==
- East Branch Missisquoi River
- Brock River
- Missisquoi River North
- Sutton River
- Lake Champlain
- Richelieu River
- List of rivers of Quebec
- List of rivers of Vermont
