= Sutton River (Missisquoi River tributary) =

Sutton River North Branch Missisquoi River for a 2,7 km in Vermont
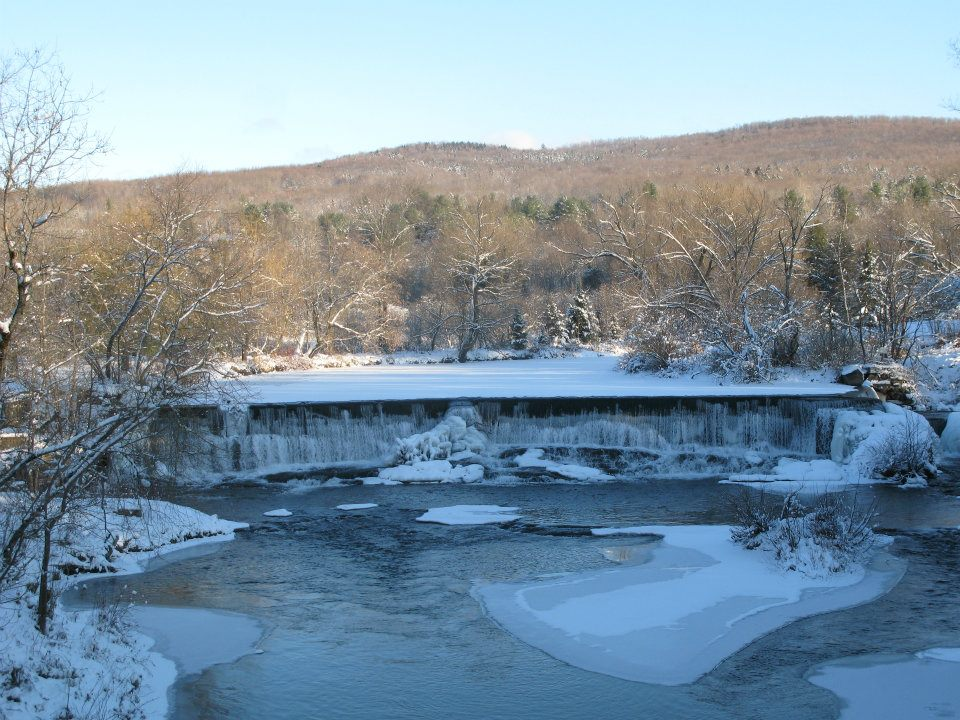
- Waterfall in Abercorn, Quebec
- Native name: Rivière Sutton (French)

Location
- Country: Canada
- Province: Quebec
- Region: Montérégie
- Regional County Municipality: Brome-Missisquoi Regional County Municipality
- Municipality: Sutton, Abercorn

Physical characteristics
- Source: Lake Spruce
  - location: Sutton
  - coordinates: 45°05′20″N 72°32′55″W
  - elevation: 746 m (2,448 ft)
- Mouth: Missisquoi River
  - location: Richford, in Franklin County
  - coordinates: 44°59′30″N 72°41′01″W
  - elevation: 128 m (420 ft)
- Length: 23.9 km (14.9 mi)

Basin features
- Progression: Missisquoi River, Lake Champlain, Richelieu River, Saint Lawrence River
- Tributaries
  - left: (Upstream) Vermont: 4 streams. Quebec: 4 unidentified stream, Cook's stream, discharge from two small lakes in the village of Sutton, an unidentified stream.
  - right: (Upstream) Vermont: 5 streams. Quebec: 2 unidentified stream, Blanc stream, Alder stream, Santerre stream, stream (Kelly Lake outlet), unidentified stream, Little Mud Pond outlet.

The Sutton River (French: Rivière Sutton), North Branch Missisquoi River in the United States, is a transboundary watercourse tributary of the Missisquoi River, crossing from north to south:

- the municipalities Sutton and Abercorn, in the Brome-Missisquoi Regional County Municipality, in the region administrative Montérégie, south of province of Quebec, in Canada; and
- Richford, in Franklin County, in the state of Vermont, northeast of the United States. Note: The segment of 2.7 km in Vermont is named "North Branch Missisquoi River".

Tourism and culture are the main economical activities of this valley. In 2014, Sutton Town had 52 tourist business generating 575 jobs. The Sutton Strategic Development Plan of 2014 mentioned the rising of outdoor recreational activities in popularity. This plan indicated that 46 000 visitors per year are recorded. This plan indicated that agricultural land under-used. Besides the urban areas, agriculture constitutes the second economic activity of this small valley; forestry, third.

The river surface is generally frozen from mid-December to the end of March. Safe traffic on the ice is generally from late December to early March. The water level of the river varies with the seasons and the precipitation.

== Geography ==
The Sutton River flows southward through the valley, in the same direction as Canadian Pacific Railway path and route 139, to reach Richford, Vermont.

The Sutton River rises at Spruce Lake (length: 240 kilometres (150 mi); altitude: 746 metres (2,448 ft)) on the western slope of Mont Sutton, either at the foot alpine ski slopes. Lac Spruce is encased between Mont Gagnon (located on the northeast side) and Le Round Top (located on the southwest side). This small lake is located 0.2 kilometres (0.12 mi) south of Mud Pond Lake, 6.6 kilometres (4.1 mi) east of the center of the village of Sutton and almost at the limit of the watershed on the Brock River side (a tributary of the Missisquoi River).

=== Course in Canada ===
From its source (lake Spruce), the course of the Sutton River flows over 23.9 kilometres (14.9 mi), generally to the south, with a drop of 618 metres (2,028 ft), according to the following segments:

- 3.1 kilometres (1.9 mi) towards the north-west, first crossing Lake Vogel (length: 0.14 kilometres (0.087 mi); altitude: 732 metres (2,402 ft)) and passing on the southwest side of a small hamlet, to the outlet (coming from the east) of Mud Pond lake;
- 6.3 kilometres (3.9 mi) towards the west by forming a slight curve towards the north to collect the discharge (coming from the northeast) of Lake Kelly and also to bypass the Développement-Boulanger; then curving towards the southwest to cross the village of Sutton, cutting the [Canadian Pacific Railway] railway, to the outlet (coming from the north) of a stream;
- 5.4 kilometres (3.4 mi) to the south by collecting a stream (coming from the northwest), by collecting the Cook stream (coming from the east), by cutting Jordan road and route 139; then by bending towards the southwest by collecting a stream (coming from the east), until the Alder stream (coming from the northwest);
- 3.8 kilometres (2.4 mi) towards the south by forming a first curve towards the east to collect a stream (coming from the east), by crossing the path of Pinnacle East and by forming a second curve towards the east to collect a stream (coming from the east and which constitutes the outlet of Lac à Jenne), up to the White stream (coming from the northwest);
- 2.9 kilometres (1.8 mi) first towards the south, towards the southwest by crossing rue des Églises Est and by forming a curve towards the southeast to bypass an area of marsh, up to the bridge from route 139 (north-south);
- 1.3 kilometres (0.81 mi) towards the south-west by collecting a stream (coming from the east) and forming two large curves and forming a loop towards the south before turning off towards the west at the end of segment, to a stream (coming from the west);
- 1.1 kilometres (0.68 mi) south to the Canada-US border.

=== Course in the United States ===
From the Canada-US border, the course of the Sutton River, now called the North Branch Mississquoi River, descends 2.7 kilometres (1.7 mi) to the southwest in an agricultural area, forming two curves toward the southeast, crossing Pinnacle Road.[4] The North Branch Mississquoi River then flows into a bend in the north bank of the Missisquoi River.

From the Canada-US border, the course of the Sutton River descends 2.7 kilometres (1.7 mi) to the southwest in an agricultural area, forming two curves toward the southeast, and crossing the Pinnacle Road. The Sutton River flows into a bend in the north bank of the Missisquoi River. This confluence is located 0.7 kilometres (0.43 mi) west of downtown Richford, Vermont. The road that runs along the west side of this American segment of this stream is called North Branch Rd.

== Flood zone ==
The by-law relating to the town planning program for the town of Sutton mentions a flood zone along the Sutton river, between Schweizer road and the boundary of the municipality of Abercorn.

During the night of July 14 to 15, 1997, torrential rains fell on the valley of the Sutton river. A bridge on a tributary of the west bank of the Sutton River on Claybank Road (which takes the name of Frontier Road at Frelighsburg) in Abercorn was badly damaged. The flood took the bottom of the road and the wooden structure of the bridge crashed into the bottom of the stream. The debris blocked the branches carried by the current. Almost all of Abercorn's roads were damaged, notably Spencer and Church streets.

== Toponymy ==
The name of the American segment of Sutton River, which is designated "North Branch Missisquoi River", creates confusion with the name of the Missisquoi River North which spills 31.9 km (19.8 mi) upstream on the north shore of the Missisquoi River in Canada. The course of the Missisquoi North River flows between the mouth of Eastman Lake and Highwater, entirely in Quebec.

In addition, in Vermont, there is a second Sutton River which is a tributary of the West Branch Passumpsic River; the latest is part of the watershed of the Connecticut River.

The toponym "Rivière Sutton" was formalized on December 5, 1968, at the Place Names Bank of the Commission de toponymie du Québec.

== See also ==
- List of rivers of Quebec
