= Rock River (Lake Champlain) =

Location
- Country: Canada, United States
- Province and State: Quebec, Vermont
- Region: Montérégie and Franklin County, Vermont
- Regional County Municipality: Le Haut-Richelieu Regional County Municipality
- Municipality: Franklin, Highgate and Saint-Armand

Physical characteristics
- Source: Marsh zone
  - location: Franklin
  - coordinates: 44.944603°N 72.955622°W
- Mouth: Rock River Bay in northern lake Champlain
  - location: Highgate
  - coordinates: 44°59′20″N 73°05′17″W
  - elevation: 31 m (102 ft)
- Length: 40.8 km (25.4 mi)

Basin features
- Progression: Missisquoi Bay, Lake Champlain, Richelieu River, Saint Lawrence River
- Tributaries
  - left: (Upstream) Unidentified stream, unidentified stream, unidentified stream, unidentified stream.
  - right: (Upstream) Swennen Creek, Brandy Creek, Unidentified Creek, Unidentified Creek, Unidentified Creek.

The Rock River (French: Rivière de la Roche) is a tributary of Rock River Bay, an arm of Missisquoi Bay in the northern part of Lake Champlain. The river rises in the town of Franklin, in Franklin County, Vermont, United States, flows west into the town of Highgate, Vermont, and then north into Saint-Armand, Quebec, in the Brome-Missisquoi Regional County Municipality, administrative region of Montérégie, in the southwest of the province of Quebec, Canada. The river then turns south and re-enters Highgate, flowing into Rock River Bay north of Highgate Springs.

Besides the village area of Saint-Armand, agriculture is the main economic activity in the river valley; recreational tourism is a secondary activity near Lake Champlain.

The Rock River valley is crossed the following roads:

- Franklin County (upper course): Hanna Road, Beaver Meadow Road, Barnum Road and Browns Corner Road;
- Highgate (intermediate course): Bouchard Road, Cassidy Road, Gore Road (VT 207) Tarte Road, and Rollo Road;
- Saint-Armand (in Quebec): chemin Pelletier Sud, chemin de Saint-Armand, chemin Bradley;
- Highgate (lower course): Saint Armand Road, Interstate 89, and Spring Street (US 7).

The surface of the Rock River (except the rapids zones) is generally frozen from mid-December to the beginning of March, but the safe circulation on the ice is generally made from the end of December to the end of February. The water level of the river varies with the seasons and the precipitation; the spring flood generally occurs in March.

== Geography ==
Via Lake Champlain and the Richelieu River, it is part of the watershed of the St. Lawrence River.

The Rock River originates from a swamp area in Franklin County, on the edge of the town of Highgate. This source is located between Jones Road and Hanna Road, to the west of Lake Carmi, Vermont.

The river flows over 40.8 kilometres (25.4 mi) including 30.7 kilometres (19.1 mi) in Vermont and 10.1 kilometres (6.3 mi) in Quebec, with a drop of 335 feet (102 m), according to the following segments:

- 10.1 kilometres (6.3 mi) in the upper part (in the town of Franklin in Vermont) entirely in agricultural area: first on 2.8 kilometres (1.7 mi) northeasterly to the Hanna Road bridge; then west, first forming a hook towards the north, then a large curve towards the south, crossing Browns Corner Road, collecting a stream (coming from the northeast), up to the town boundary between Franklin and Highgate;
- 13.7 kilometres (8.5 mi) in the intermediate part (in the town of Highgate in Vermont) entirely in agricultural area: first on 3.4 kilometres (2.1 mi) towards the southwest, until a river bend; then north 10.3 kilometres (6.4 mi) crossing Gore Road (VT 207), to the Canada-US border;
- 10.1 kilometres (6.3 mi) in the intermediate part (in Saint-Armand, in Quebec): first flowing 4.2 kilometres (2.6 mi) towards the northwest in the forest and agricultural zone, crossing under Chemin Pelletier Sud, forming a loop to the west, collecting Ruisseau Brandy (coming from the northeast), and crossing Chemin de Saint-Armand, to a river bend; then running 5.9 kilometres (3.7 mi) towards the southwest, passing by the east side of the village of Saint-Armand, and meandering in an agricultural area to the Canada-US border;
- 6.9 kilometres (4.3 mi) in the lower part (in Vermont): southwest from the Canada-US border, forming a few loops west and east, before heading southwesterly in an agricultural plain passing under the Saint Armand Road bridge, under the Interstate 89 bridge and under the Spring Street bridge (US 7), then flowing into the east side of Rock River Bay in Missisquoi Bay of Lake Champlain. This confluence is located in Highgate Springs, Vermont.

== Toponymy ==
According to the U.S. Geographic Names Information System, it is also known as "River Rocher" and "Riviere de La Roche".

In Quebec, the river appears on the 1732 map of the surveyor Jean-Baptiste Lefebvre, dit Anger, under the spelling "Rivière du Rocher". Formerly, in the English-speaking community of Quebec, this watercourse was designated "Rock River", as in Vermont. The name is attributable to the presence of a large rock at the mouth of the stream on the east shore of Rock River Bay. In Quebec, the toponym "Rivière de la Roche" was approved on February 2, 1955, by the Geography Commission, later renamed the Commission de toponymie du Québec.

The toponym "Rivière de la Roche" was formalized on December 5, 1968, at the Commission de toponymie du Québec.

== See also ==
- List of Quebec rivers
- List of Vermont rivers
