= Eden Lake (disambiguation) =

Eden Lake is a 2008 British horror film. Eden Lake may also refer to:

- Eden Lake, Nova Scotia, a community in Nova Scotia, Canada
- Eden Lake Township, Stearns County, Minnesota, a township in Minnesota, United States

== See also ==
- Lake Eden, a lake in Alberta, Canada
