= Vermont Granite Museum =

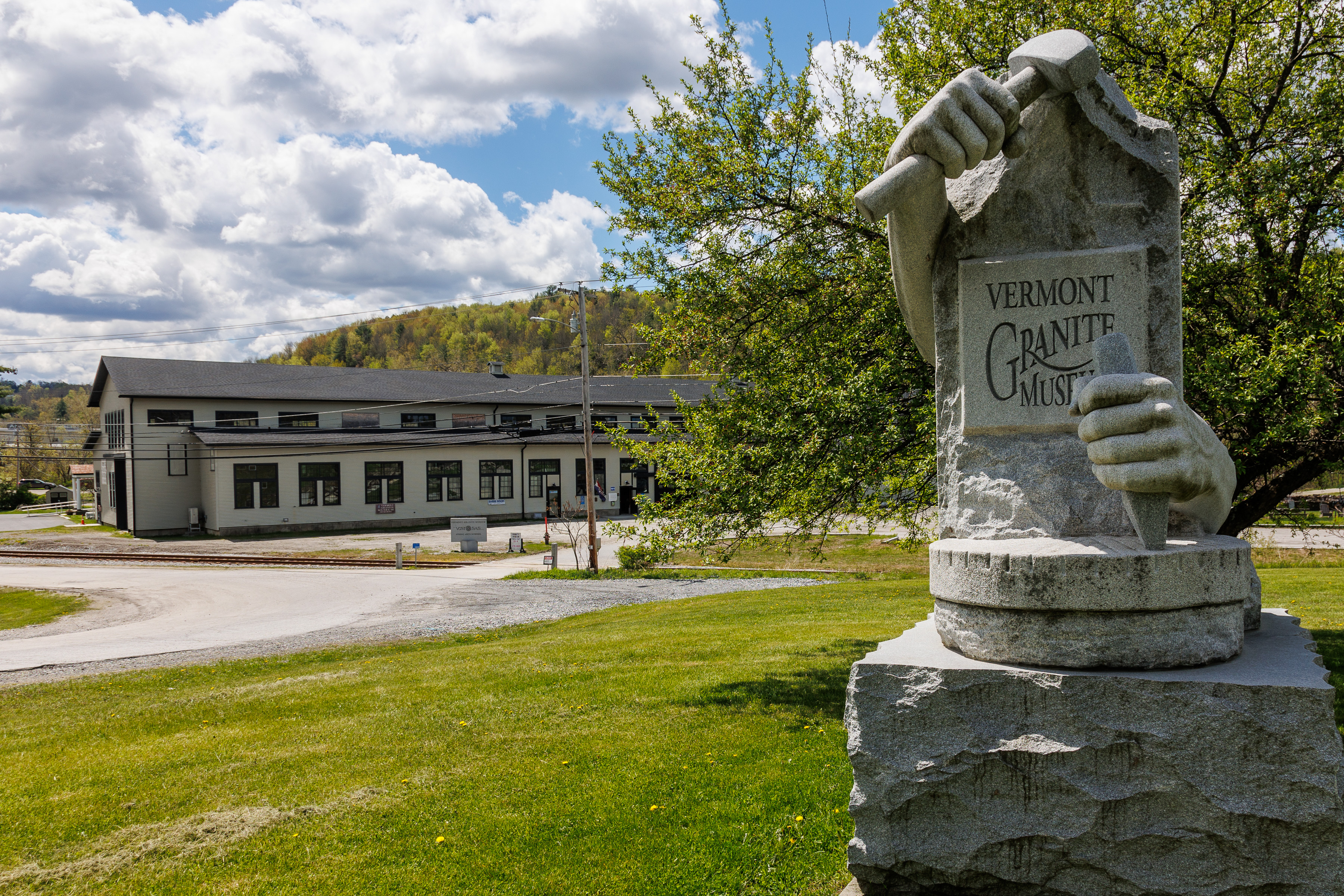
- Location: 7 Jones Bros Way; Barre, Vermont
- Type: Granite industry museum
- Website: www.vtgranitemuseum.org
- Jones Brothers Granite Shed
- U.S. National Register of Historic Places
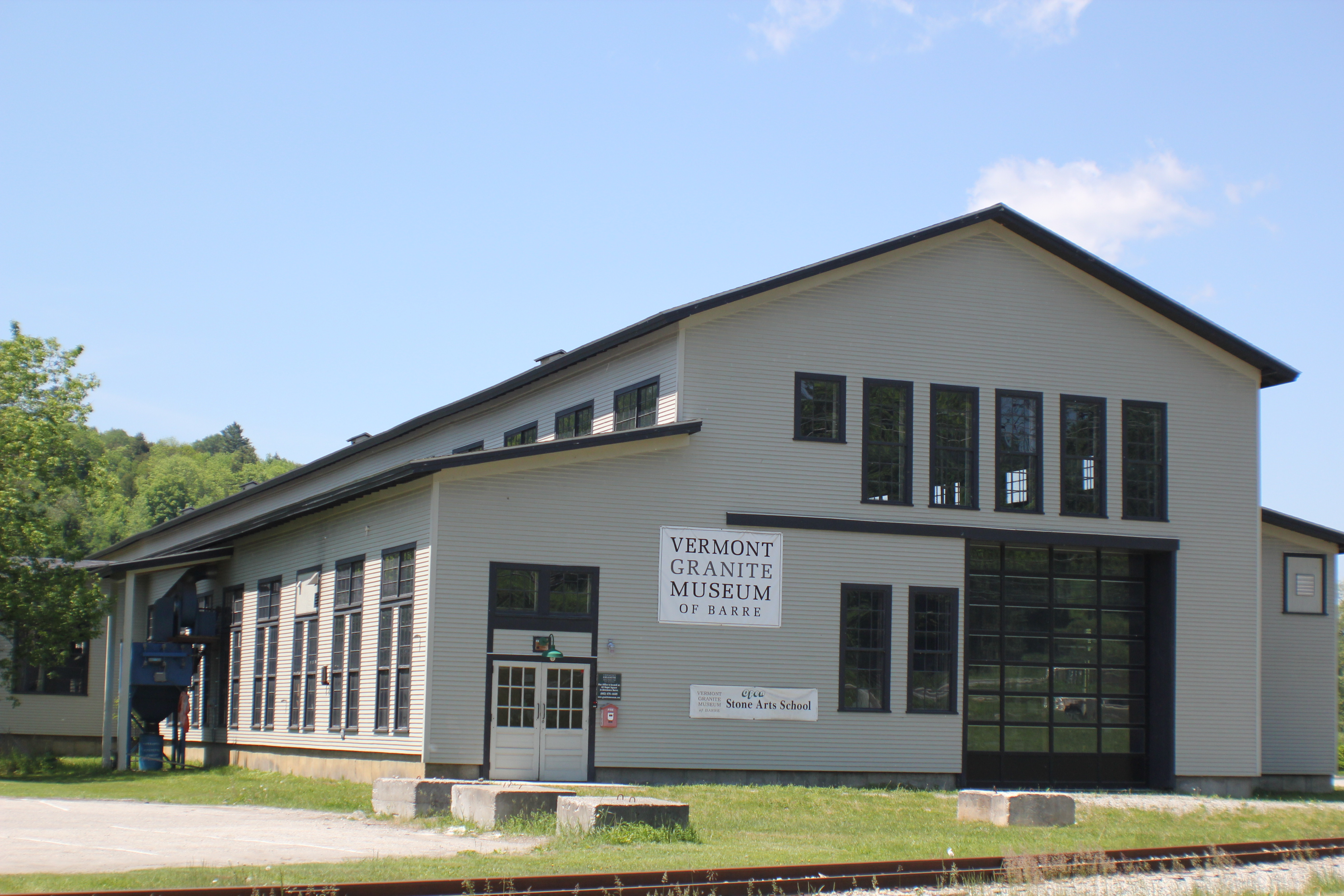

- Location within Vermont Location within the United States
- Location: 7 Jones Bros Way, Barre, Vermont
- Coordinates: 44°12′42″N 72°31′15″W
- Area: 14 acres (5.7 ha)
- Built: 1895
- Architectural style: Straight Granite Shed
- NRHP reference No.: 02000413
- Added to NRHP: April 26, 2002

The Vermont Granite Museum is a museum in the city of Barre, Vermont, devoted to the city's historically important granite quarrying and processing industry. It is located at 7 Jones Brothers Way, in the former Jones Brothers Granite Shed, a former granite processing facility listed on the National Register of Historic Places. The Stone Arts School, administered by the museum, is a teaching institution for aspiring sculptors.

== Mission ==
The museum's mission is to preserve and interpret the history of Vermont's granite industry, an economically important element of Barre's economy since the late 19th century. It is open for tours between June and October, or by special arrangement at other times. Admission is charged. Under the moniker of the Stone Arts School, the museum offers workshops in which sculptors can learn historic and modern granite-working techniques.

== Setting and building history ==
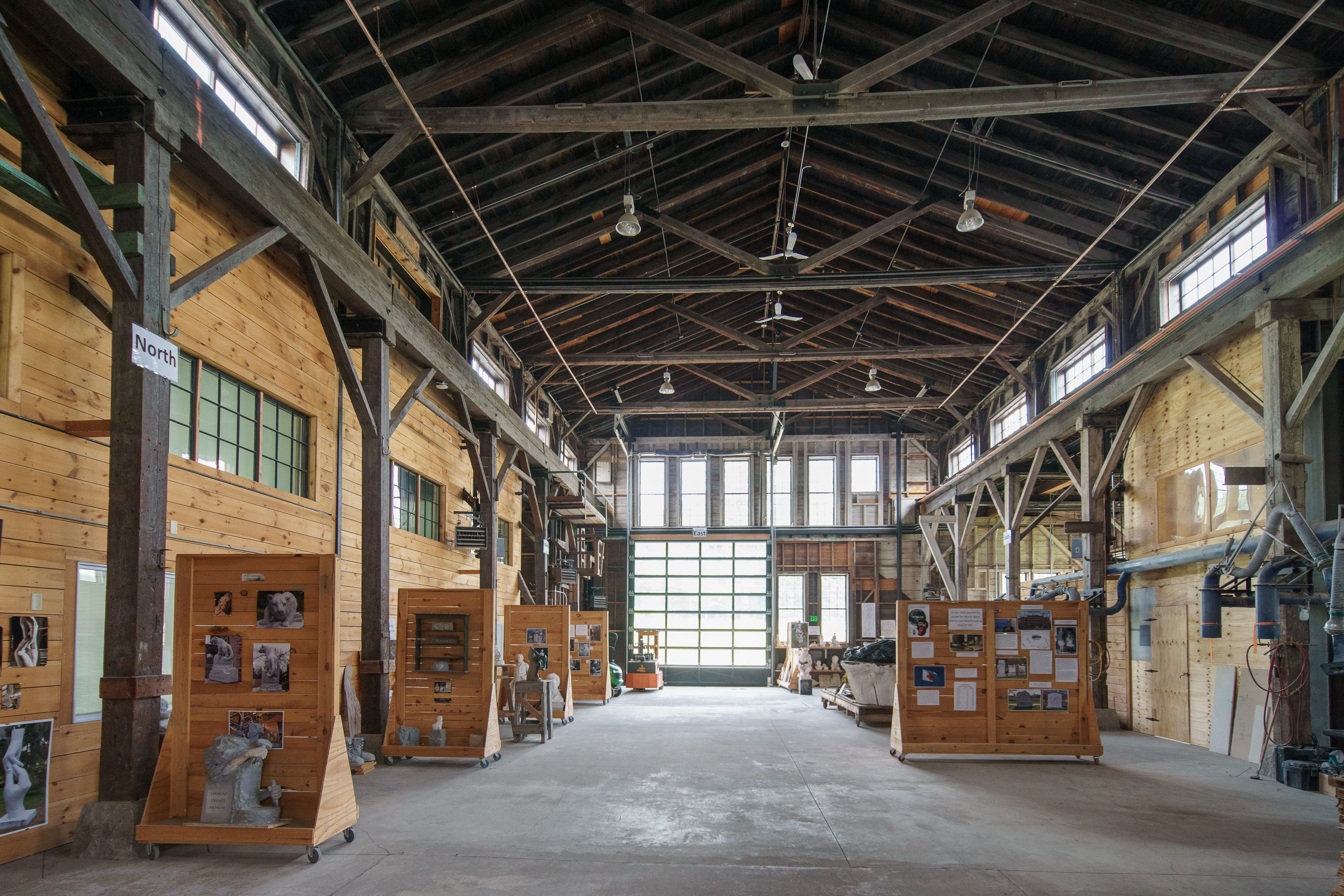
Interior

The museum is located northwest of downtown Barre, in the former Jones Brothers Granite Shed, set between North Main Street (United States Route 302) and the Stevens Branch of the Winooski River. The shed, built in 1895, is an early example of a straight shed, which replaced the previously common horseshoe design. In this facility, large blocks of granite were processed into finished products, primarily cemetery markers. Jones Brothers was founded in 1882, and was the oldest operating granite works in Vermont when it ceased operations in 1975. The shed is the principal surviving building of a once-larger complex of buildings on the site. The shed was acquired for museum use in 1997.

== See also ==
- National Register of Historic Places listings in Washington County, Vermont
