= Tyler Branch =

Location
- Country: United States
- State: Vermont
- County: Lamoille County, Franklin County, Vermont

Physical characteristics
- Source: Mountain brook
  - location: Bakersfield
  - coordinates: 44.852°N 72.710°W
- Mouth: Missisquoi River
  - location: Sheldon
  - coordinates: 44.905°N 72.838°W
  - elevation: 112 m (367 ft)
- Length: 18.5 km (11.5 mi)

Basin features
- Progression: Missisquoi River, Lake Champlain (via Missisquoi Bay), Richelieu River, Saint Lawrence River
- Tributaries
  - left: (upstream) 3 unidentified brooks, The Branch, Bogue Branch, Cold Hollow Brook.
  - right: (upstream) 5 unidentified brooks, Beaver Meadow Brook, 2 unidentified brooks.

The Tyler Branch is a tributary of the Missisquoi River, flowing successively in Bakersfield, Enosburg and in Sheldon, in Franklin County, in northern Vermont, in the United States.

The valley of the Tyler Branch is served by Tyler Branch Road passing on the northeastern shore of the river. The upper part is served by Horsehore Circle street and Enosburg Mountain Road.

The surface of the Tyler Branch is usually frozen from mid-December to mid-March, except the rapids areas; however, safe circulation on the ice is generally from late December to early March.

== Course ==
The Tyler Branch rises at (altitude: ) in Bakersfield in forested area, in mountain.

From its source, the Tyler Branch flows over 18.5 kilometres (11.5 mi) mainly in forest (upper zone) and a mix of forest and agriculture (lower zone), with a drop of . The course of the river follows more or less the Tyler Branch Road, according to the following segments:

- 2.6 kilometres (1.6 mi) towards southwest descending the slope of the mountain, then branching to the northwest, crossing the Enosburg Mountain Road, up to Cold Hollow Brook (coming from southeast);
- 2.2 kilometres (1.4 mi) towards northwest in Bakersfield, entering in Enosburg, up to Beaver Meadow Brook (coming from north-east);
- 5.0 kilometres (3.1 mi) towards northwest in Bakersfield receiving three brooks (from the northeast), then curving to the southeast, up to Bogue Brook (coming from south);
- 2.3 kilometres (1.4 mi) towards the northwest, branching west up to The Branch (coming from south);
- 6.4 kilometres (4.0 mi) towards the northwest going in agricultural area entering in Sheldon, forming a curve towards southwest, up to the mouth.

The mouth of the Tyler Branch is emptying on the south shore of Missisquoi River at 1.1 km (0.68 mi) west of the center of Enosburg Falls village. From there, the current goes generally westward on 31.7 km (19.7 mi) following the Missisquoi River up to eastern shore of Lake Champlain.

== Toponymy ==
The toponym "Tyler Branch" was registered on October 29, 1980, in the USGS (US Geological Survey).

== See also ==
- Franklin County, Vermont
- Missisquoi River
- Lake Champlain
- Richelieu River
- List of rivers of Vermont
