= Missisquoi National Wildlife Refuge =

National wildlife refuge in Vermont, United States

- IUCN category IV (habitat/species management area)
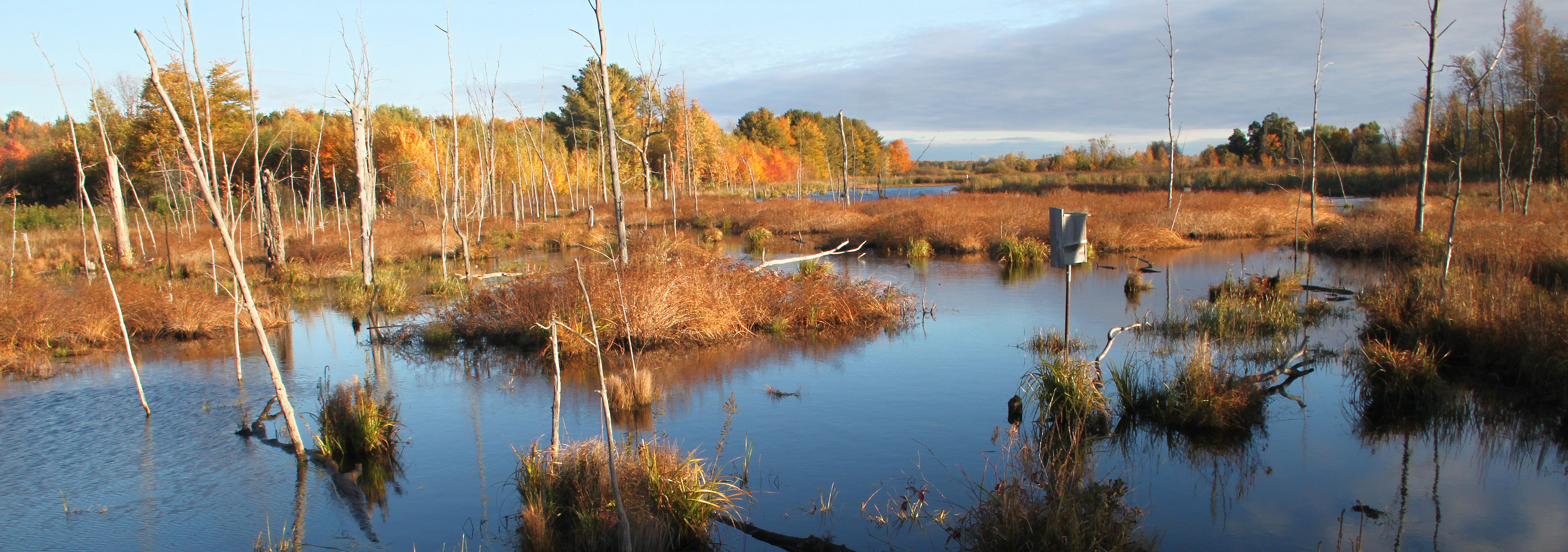

- Location within Vermont Location within the United States
- Location: Franklin County, Vermont, United States
- Nearest city: Swanton, Vermont
- Coordinates: 44°58′N 73°10′W
- Area: 7,232 acres (29.27 km^{2})
- Established: 1943
- Governing body: U.S. Fish and Wildlife Service
- Website: Missisquoi National Wildlife Refuge

Ramsar Wetland
- Official name: Missisquoi Delta and Bay Wetlands
- Designated: 20 November 2013
- Reference no.: 2200

Missisquoi National Wildlife Refuge is a National Wildlife Refuge in the U.S. state of Vermont located on the eastern shore of Lake Champlain and the southern side of Missisquoi Bay. The refuge is in Franklin County in the northwest corner of the state near the International Boundary with Canada.

The refuge was established on February 4, 1943, under the authority of the Migratory Bird Conservation Act. The initial acquisition was 1,582 acres (6.4 km^{2}) of land in the Missisquoi River delta, including Shad Island and Big Marsh Slough. Additional land is acquired from willing sellers. The refuge's current size is 7,232 acres (27 km^{2}). It was designated a Ramsar Wetland of International Importance in 2013. It is the only National Wildlife Refuge located entirely in Vermont and is administered by the United States Fish and Wildlife Service. It is located in the towns of Swanton and Highgate with satellite units in Derby, Vermont and Westville, New York.

== Habitat management ==
Refuge lands support a variety of wildlife species and habitats including floodplain forest, wetlands, shrub, bog, grasslands, and upland areas. Lands are managed to provide and protect habitat for migratory birds, to preserve the natural diversity and abundance of plants and animals, to assist with recovery of threatened and endangered species. Federal wildlife laws and regulations are enforced to ensure the protection of habitat and wildlife.

Maquam Bog is a 900-acre pitch pine woodland bog (360 ha) located on the northeastern margin of Lake Champlain, Vermont. It contains Vermont's largest populations of pitch pine, rhodora, and chain fern, a state-threatened species. The bog serves as an important wintering area for white-tailed deer and provides feeding and breeding areas for a variety of birds.

Parcels of early successional hardwoods are rotationally clear cut in 8 - 10 year intervals in an effort to provide a variety of age class hardwood habitat for woodcock. Small clearcuts, usually 100 feet wide, are used on the refuge to create feeding, nesting and brood-rearing covers. Permanently mowed pieces of land adjacent to the clearcuts provide singing grounds and roosting areas for American woodcock. Woodcock, like ruffed grouse, turkey, white-tailed deer and a variety of songbirds all require forest habitat that is disturbed periodically to stimulate regeneration of dense hardwood stands that support declining woodcock populations throughout the east.

Grasslands are periodically hayed, mowed or burned to keep open field from changing back to forest. Many wildlife species benefit from these open field habitats. Waterfowl, bobolinks, and many other songbirds, pollinators and small mammals use open fields to nest and rear young. Birds of prey such as kestrel, northern harriers and rough-legged hawks glide over these same grasslands in search of prey such as mice, voles and other small mammals.

In addition to 5,000 acres (2,000 ha) of natural marsh, the refuge includes 1,200 acres (490 ha) of managed wetlands formed by three impoundments. Water levels in these areas are manipulated to encourage the growth of waterfowl food and cover plants such as wild rice and buttonbush, while also exposing hummocks of soil and vegetation that support nesting by mallards, American black ducks and other wetland birds.

== Fauna ==
The largest great blue heron rookery in Vermont has been on the refuge's Shad Island. This rookery fluctuates from about 250 to almost 600 nests each year. This rookery has been reduced in since 2015, due to an increasing bald eagle population. More than 20,000 ducks converge on the refuge each fall and find habitat for feeding and resting. In the spring, a small percentage of those use the refuge habitats for nesting. All of Vermont's endangered black terns nest on the refuge. A significant percentage of Vermont's nesting ospreys are found on the refuge. Spiny softshell turtles, a state threatened species, use the refuge to feed and bask from April through September. Mammals that inhabit this refuge include raccoon, black bear, coyote, skunk, beaver, red fox, river otter, bobcat, porcupine, muskrat, and mink.
