= Donald Collins (Vermont politician) =

American politician (born 1942)

Member of the Vermont House of Representatives
- In office 2012–2014
- In office 2002–2008

Personal details
- Born: Donald E. Collins; November 11, 1942 (age 83) Lowell, Vermont, U.S.
- Party: Democratic
- Spouse: Susan
- Children: 2
- Education: Johnson State College (BA); University of Maine (MA); University of Vermont
- Occupation: Politician

Donald Collins (born November 11, 1942) is an American former politician from Vermont. Collins, a Democrat from Franklin County, served in the Vermont Senate. He first served from 2002 to 2008. He was re-elected in 2008, 2010, 2012 and 2014.

Collins was born in Lowell, Vermont, and resides in Swanton. He earned his B.A. from Johnson State College, an M.A. from the University of Maine and a Certificate of Advanced Graduate Study from the University of Vermont. Collins served on the Swanton School Board.
