= Brock River (Missisquoi River) =

Location
- Country: Canada
- Province: Quebec
- Region: Estrie
- MRC: Brome-Missisquoi Regional County Municipality
- Municipality: Sutton

Physical characteristics
- Source: Confluence of mountain streams
  - location: Sutton
  - coordinates: 45°05′31″N 72°30′53″W
  - elevation: 553 m (1,814 ft)
- Mouth: Chenal de l'Île d'Orléans (Saint Lawrence River)
  - location: Sutton
  - coordinates: 45°02′30″N 72°29′56″W
  - elevation: 159 m (522 ft)
- Length: 6.9 km (4.3 mi)

Basin features
- Progression: Missisquoi River, Missisquoi Bay, lake Champlain, Richelieu River, Saint Lawrence River

The Brock River is a stream on the north bank of the Missisquoi River. The Brock River flows in the municipality of Sutton, in the Brome-Missisquoi Regional County Municipality, in the administrative region of Estrie, in the province of Quebec, in Canada.

Road access to this valley is possible by the Eastman road (attached to the south to the Vallée-Missisquoi road), serving the lower part of this small valley (east side). Forestry is the main activity in this small valley; recreational tourism, second.

The surface of the Brock River is generally frozen from the beginning of December until the end of March; however, safe circulation on the ice is generally done from mid-December to mid-March, except the rapids areas. The water level of the river varies with the seasons and the precipitation; the spring flood occurs in March or April.

== Geography ==
The Brock River originates at the confluence of mountain streams. This source is located at 0.9 kilometres (0.56 mi) northeast of the summit of Mont Gagnon (altitude: 849 metres (2,785 ft)), at 2.7 kilometres (1.7 mi) to the southwest from the summit (altitude: 755 metres (2,477 ft)) of Mont Écho, and 8.1 kilometres (5.0 mi) east of the village center of Sutton.

From its source, the Brock River flows over 6.9 kilometres (4.3 mi), with a drop of 394 metres (1,293 ft), according to the following segments:

- 3.6 kilometres (2.2 mi) south-east to a mountain stream (coming from the north-west);
- 1.3 kilometres (0.81 mi) south-east to a mountain stream (coming from the north-west);
- 2.0 kilometres (1.2 mi) to the southeast by cutting two forest roads to its mouth

The Brock River flows on the north bank of the Missisquoi River in the municipality of Sutton, facing the railway (which runs along the south bank of the Missisquoi River) and a mountain. This confluence is located 3.7 kilometres (2.3 mi) north of the Canada-US border; 9.1 kilometres (5.7 mi) upstream of the Canada-US border; 11.7 kilometres (7.3 mi) south-east of the village center of Sutton and 5.7 kilometres (3.5 mi) west of the center of the village of Highwater.

== Toponymy ==
The toponym "Brock River" was formalized on September 1, 1983 at the Commission de toponymie du Québec.

== See also ==
- Brome-Missisquoi Regional County Municipality
- Sutton, a municipality
- Missisquoi River, a stream
- List of rivers of Quebec
