= Shetley Creek =

Stream in the American state of Missouri

Coordinates: 37°19′55″N 90°12′40″W

Shetley Creek is a stream in southeast Madison County in the U.S. state of Missouri. It is a tributary of the Upper Castor River.

Shetley Creek has the name of Caleb Shetley, the original owner of the site.

== See also ==
- List of rivers of Missouri
