= Mont Sutton =

Ski resort in Quebec, Canada

- Interactive map of Mont Sutton
- Location: 671 Maple Street, Sutton (QC), Canada J0E 2K0
- Coordinates: 45°06′15″N 72°33′29″W
- Vertical: 568 metres (1,864 ft)
- Top elevation: 968 metres (3,176 ft)
- Base elevation: 400 metres (1,300 ft)
- Skiable area: 60 trails
- Lift system: 10 chairlifts
- Website: https://montsutton.com/en/

Mont Sutton is a four-season attraction, well known for hiking, skiing in winter, and also offering a range of summer activities: mountain biking, disc golf, chairlift ride, giant zipline and a zipline coaster. It's located in Sutton, Quebec, Canada, in the Estrie administrative region and in the Eastern Townships touristic region.

== History ==
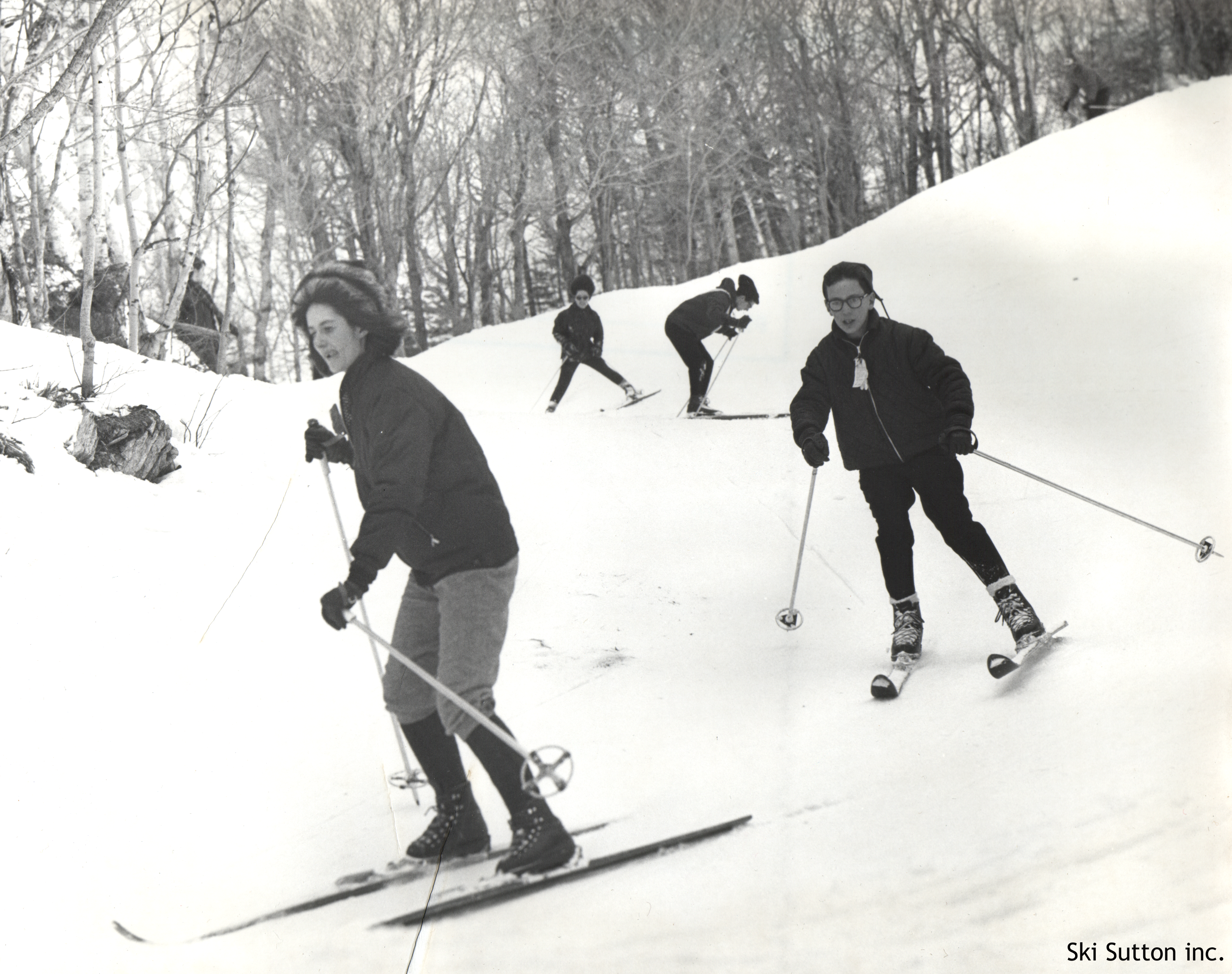
1960

In 1960, the Boulanger family, owners of the land at that time, opened the Mont Sutton ski resort. It was Réal Boulanger who laid out the first trails in the mountain's woods. The Boulanger family operated the ski resort for several years, until March 2016.

The mountain was then purchased by a group of local investors, headed by Jean-Michel Ryan, President and CEO. That same year, a portion of the resort's land was transferred to the Nature Conservancy of Canada.

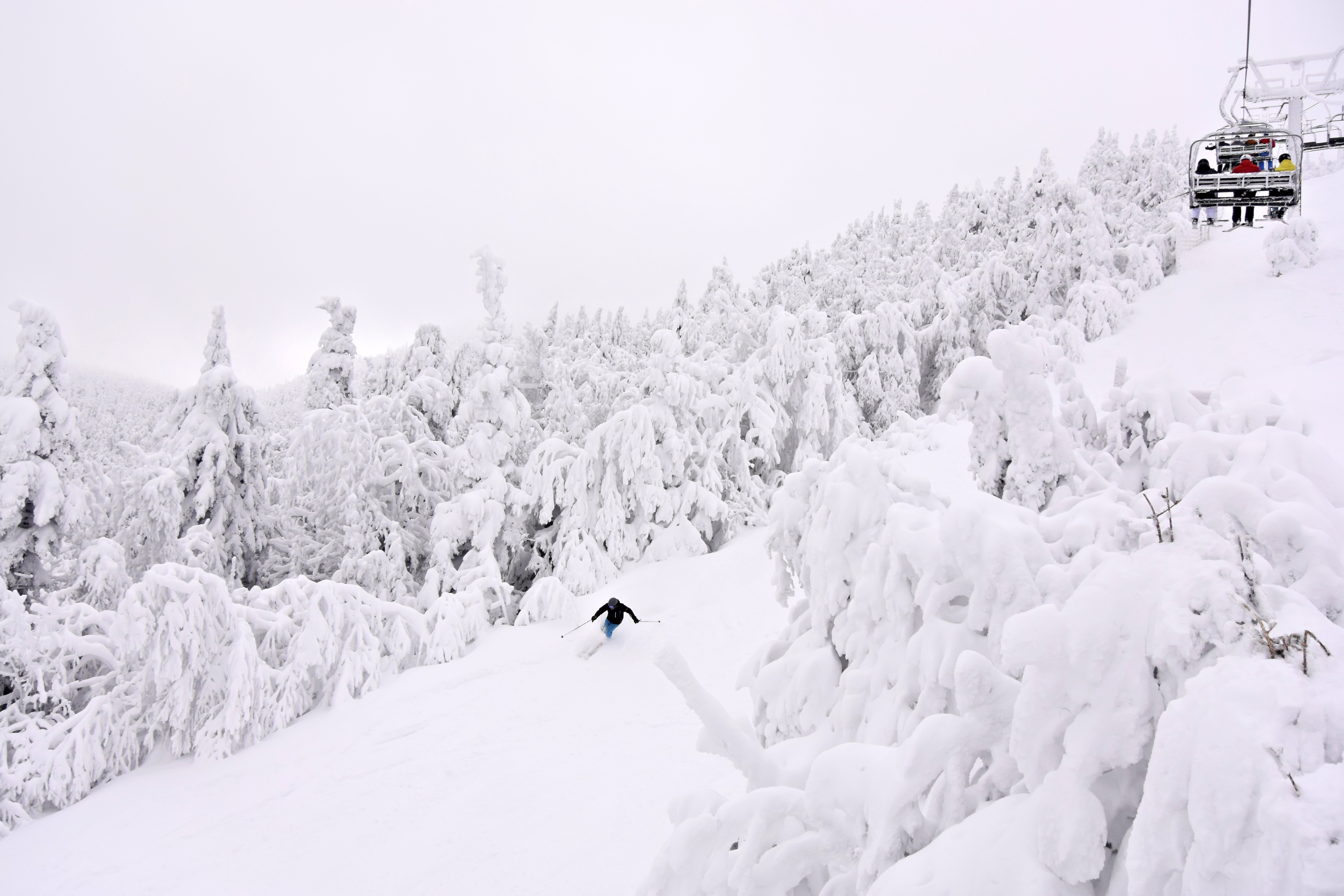
Mont Sutton

Following the acquisition of the resort, the Ryan group made several investments to improve the experience offered at the mountain. Notably, the group invested over ten million dollars to make the mountain a four-season destination. As a matter of fact, in the past years, a summit campground, a multiple of mountain bike trails offered in collaboration with Plein air Sutton / MTB, a giant zip line, a zip line coaster and a disc golf course have been added to Mont Sutton while preserving the mountain's DNA.

Mont Sutton is home to Quebec's first-ever high-speed quadruple chairlift. Mont Sutton's chairlift No. 2 was built in 1985 and has been serving the mountain ever since. The mountain will also feature Quebec's first-ever Skytrac lift, set to be ready for the 2026-2027 ski season.

== Geography ==
Mont Sutton is located in the extreme south of Quebec, in the southeast of the Montérégie administrative region and west of the Eastern Townships tourist region. It is less than 10 kilometers north of the Canadian American border, about 5 kilometers east of the village of Sutton. It is accessible by route 139 from the greater Montreal area and by route 215 from Sherbrooke. Maple Street is the road that links the village to the mountain.

The ski resort is located on the northwestern flank of Round Top, the highest point of the Sutton Mountains in the Appalachians. Round Top has an altitude of over 968 meters, but the ski network reaches a height of 870 meters.

== Gallery ==
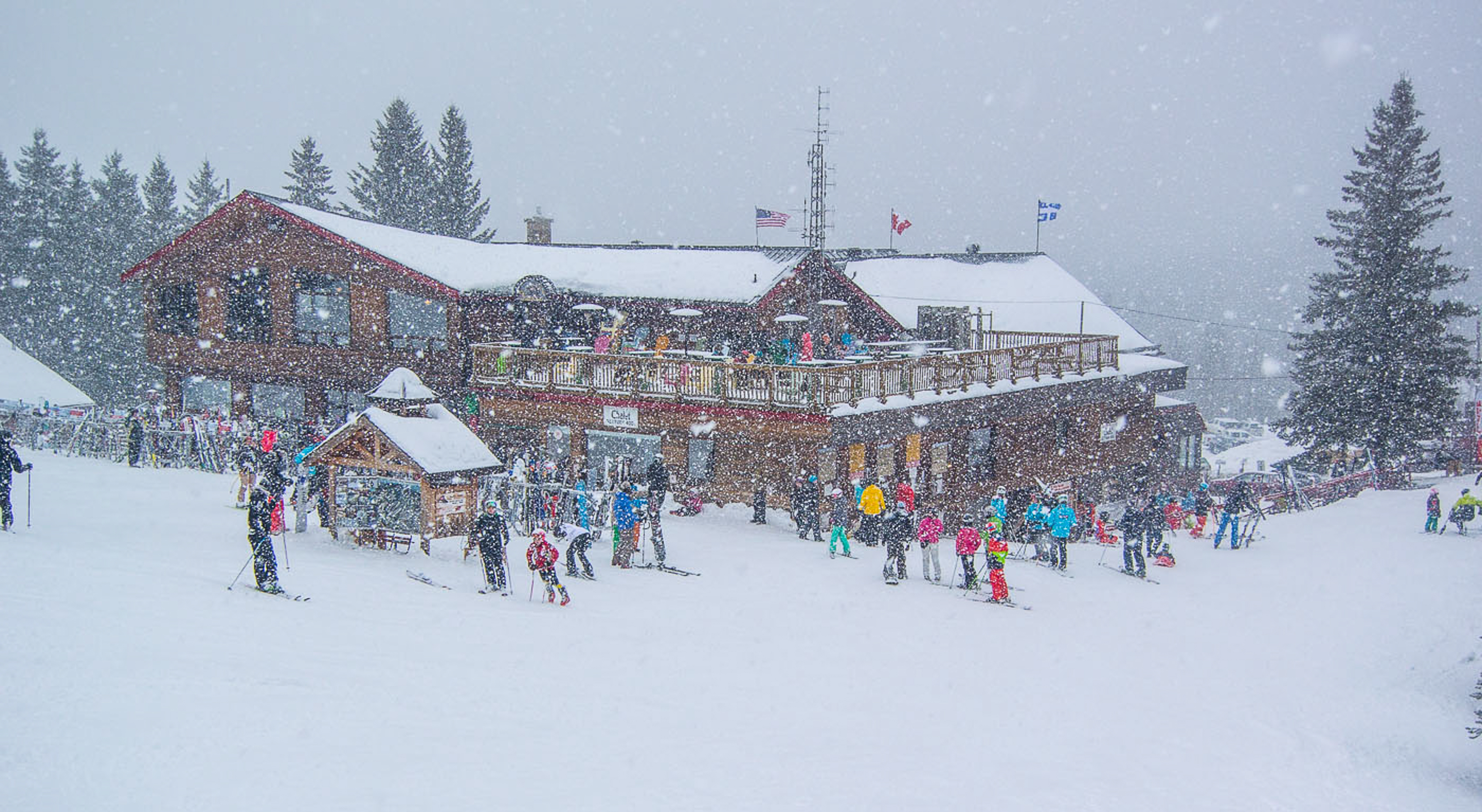
Chalet

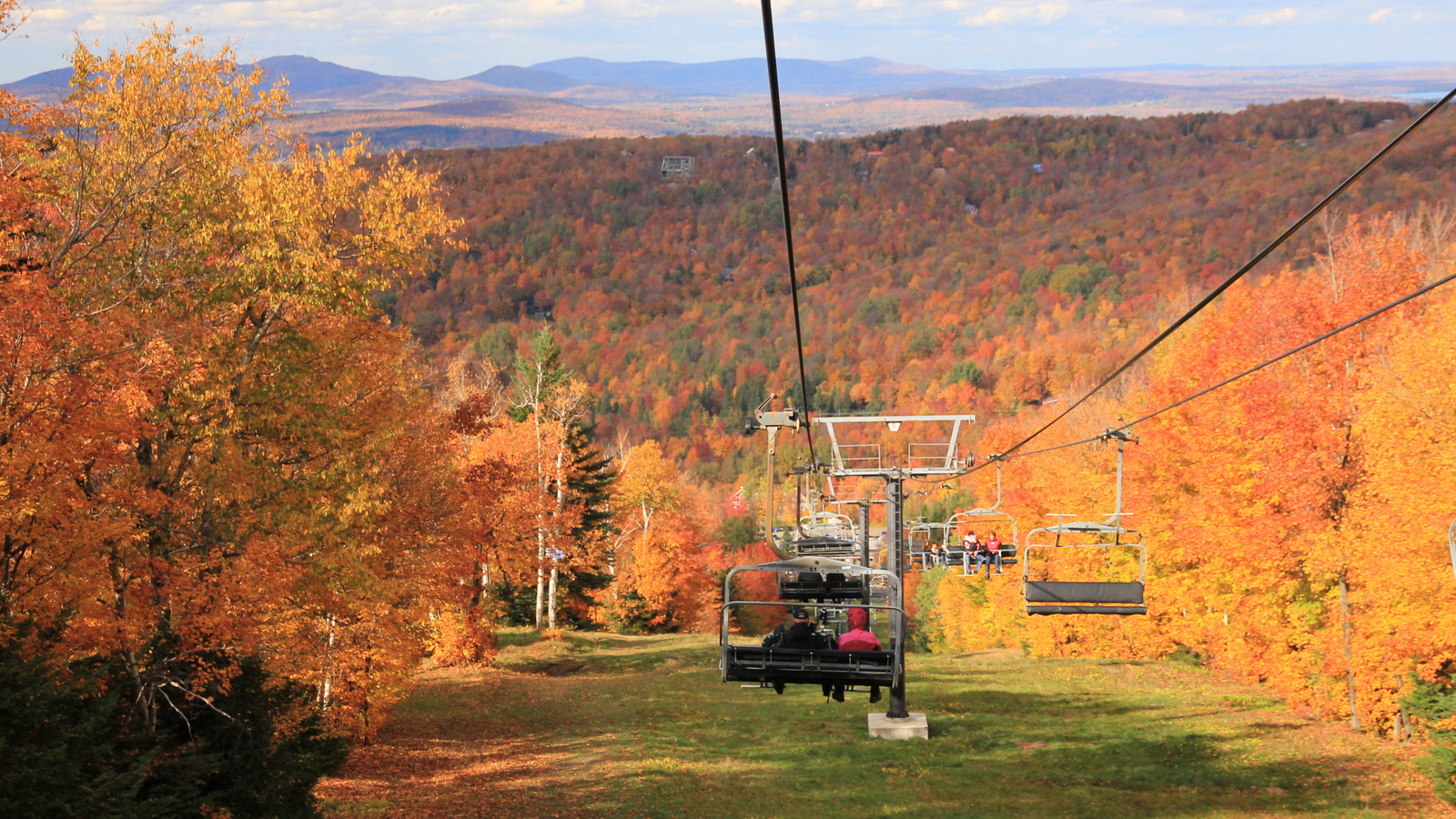
Chairlift ride

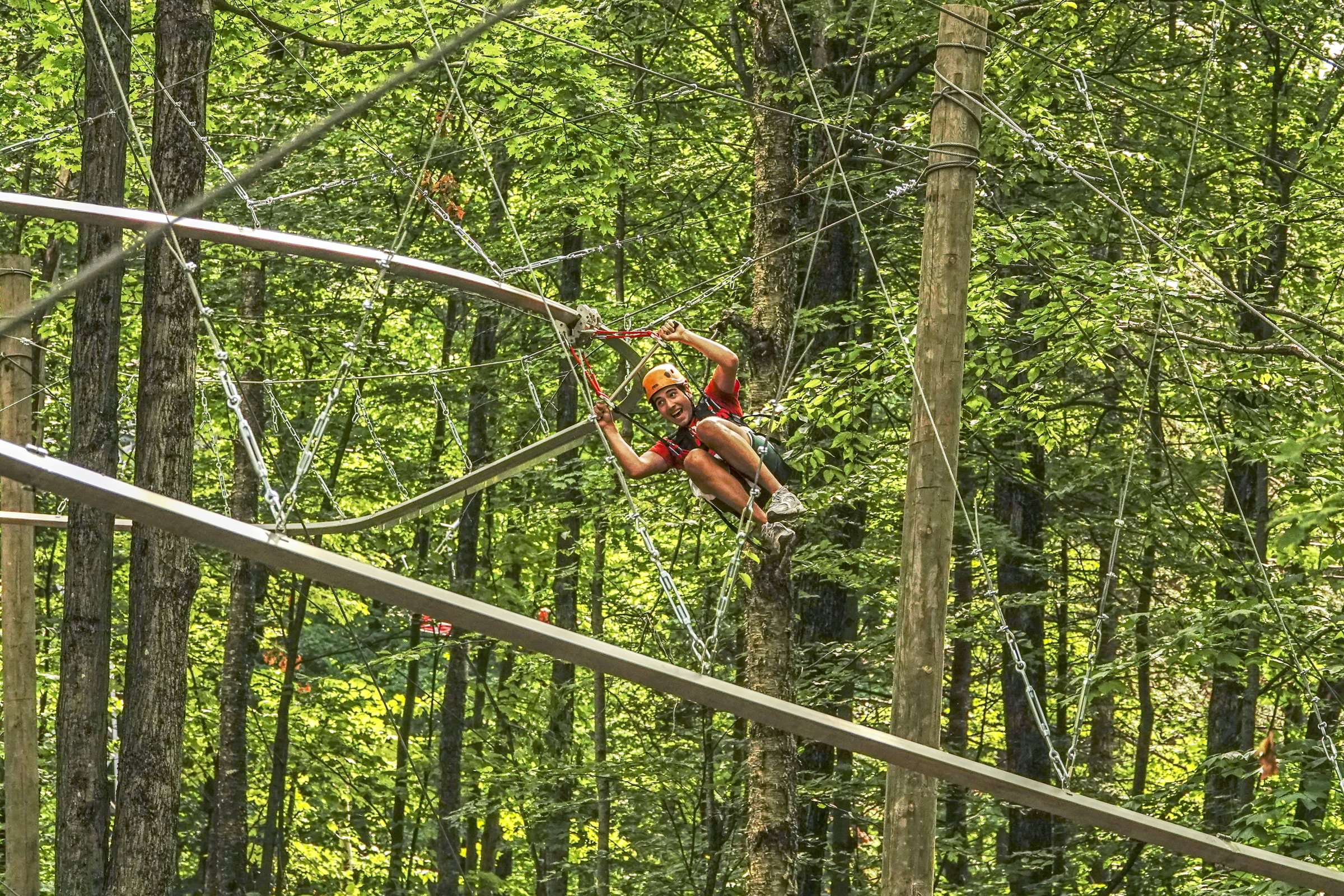
Zipline coaster

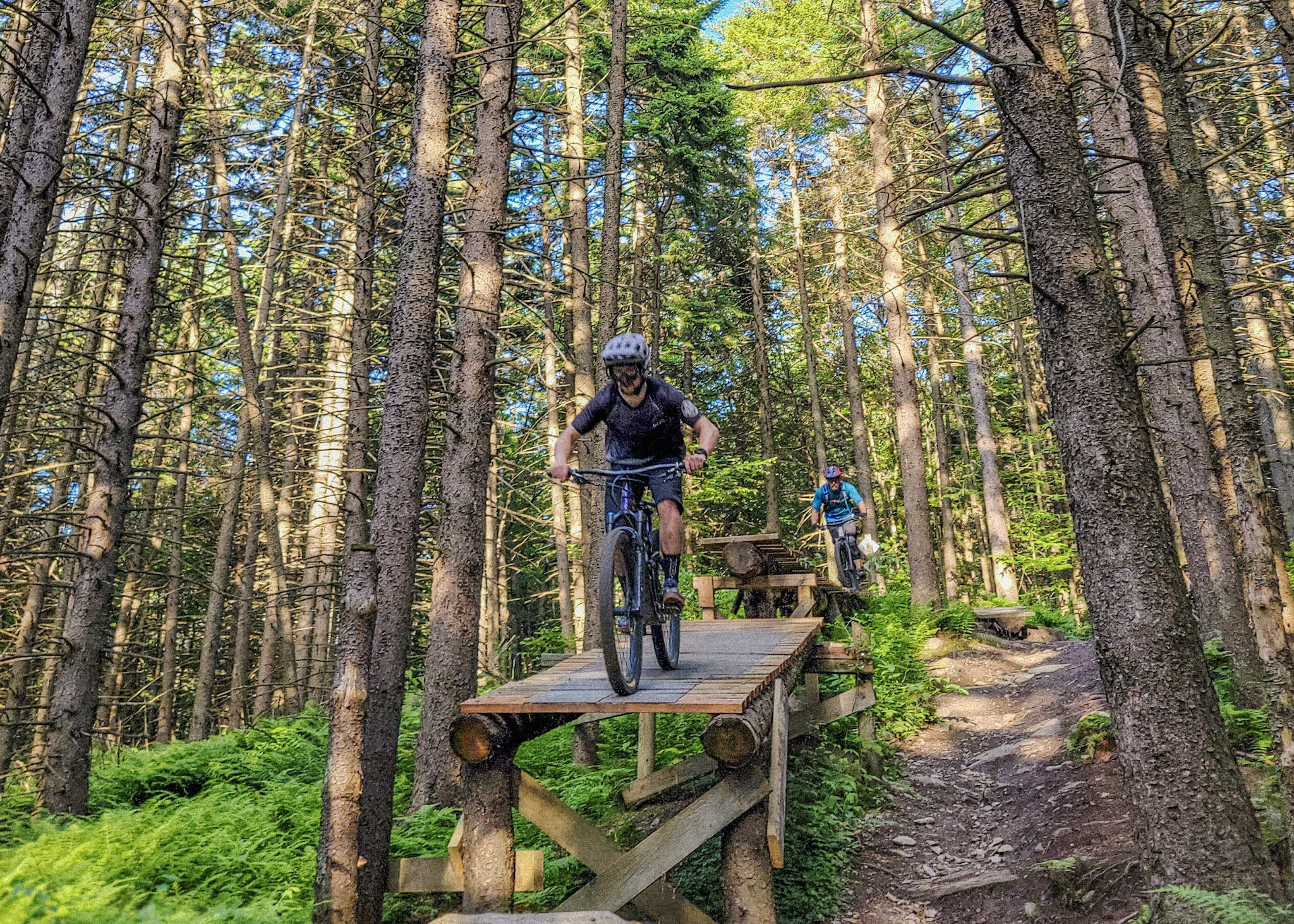
Mountain bike

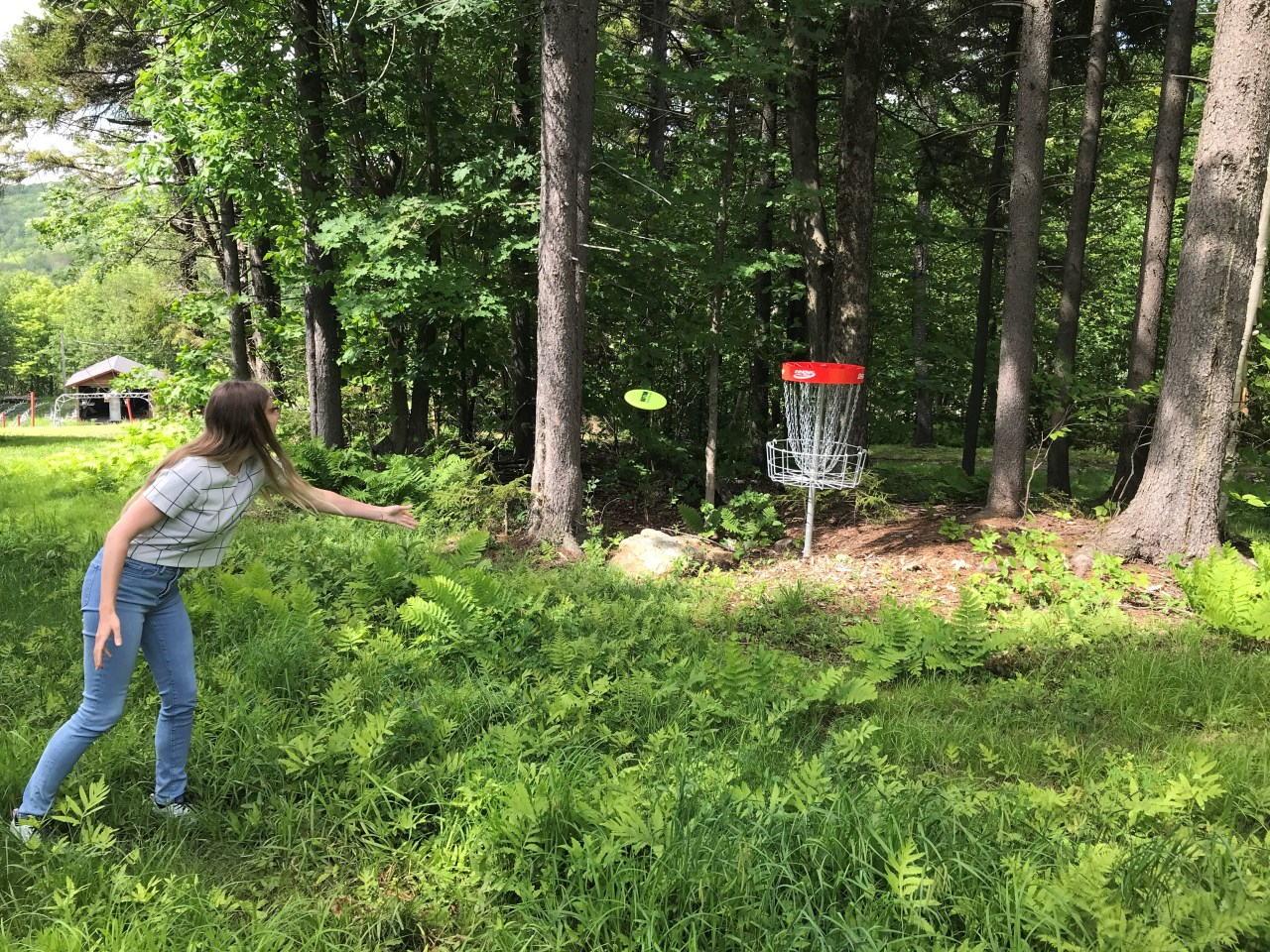
Disc golf

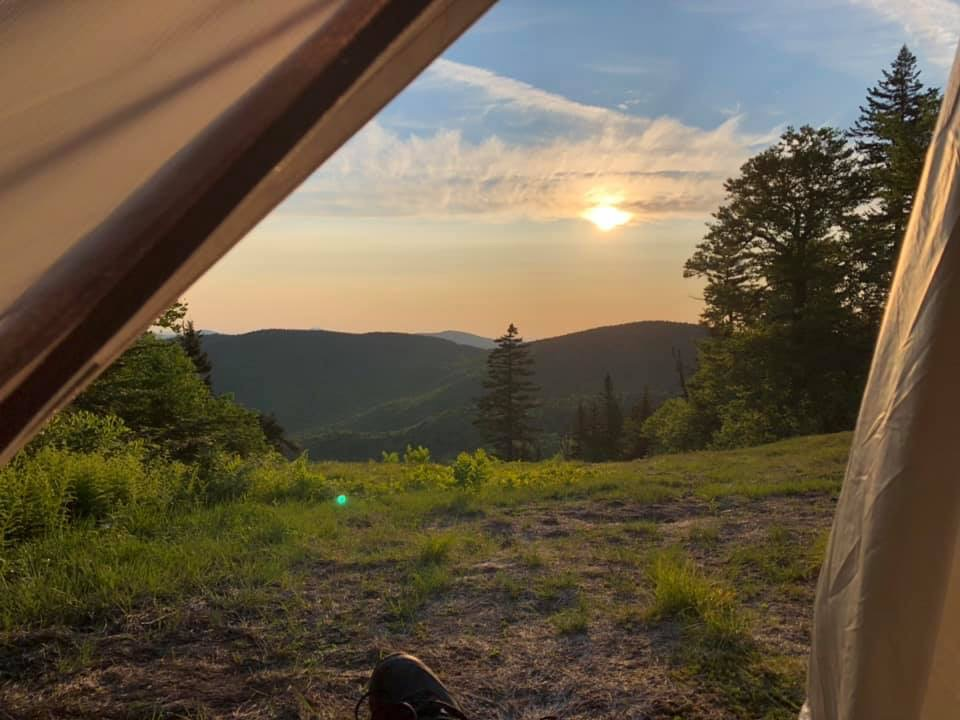
Camping at the summit

== See also ==
- List of ski areas and resorts in Canada
