= West Haven, Vermont =

- Town
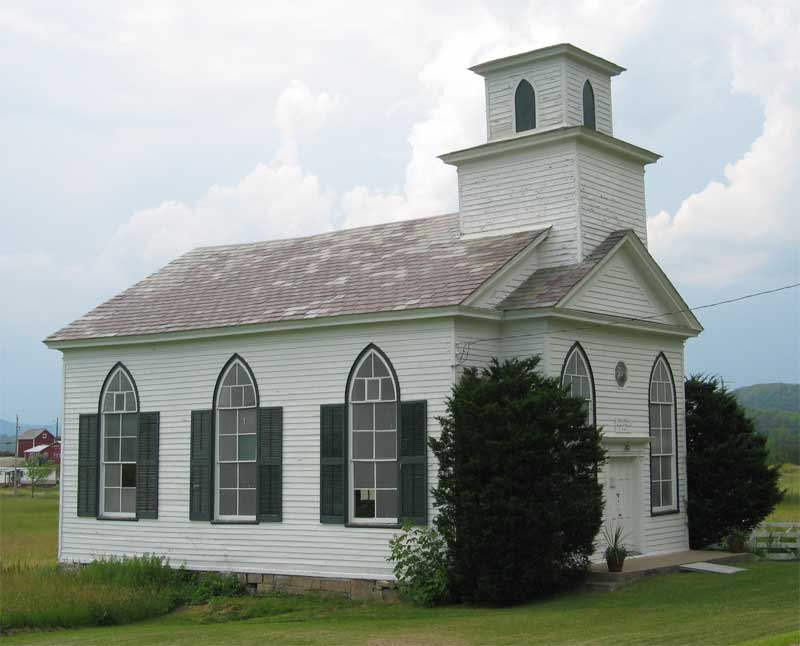
- West Haven Baptist Church

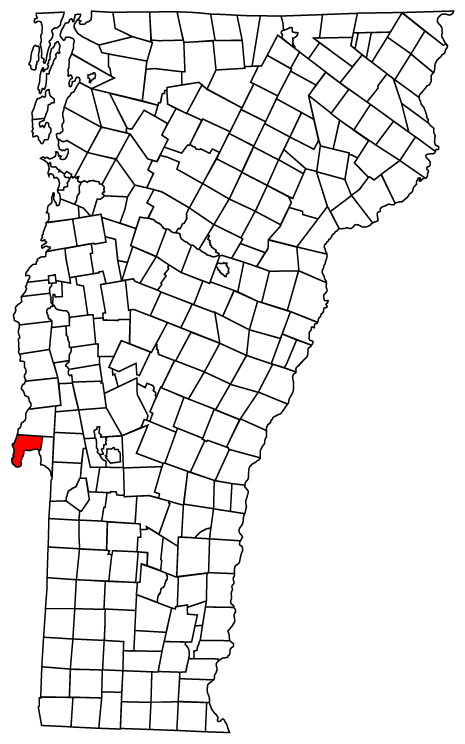
- West Haven, Vermont
- Coordinates: 43°37′10″N 73°23′48″W
- Country: United States
- State: Vermont
- County: Rutland

Area
  - Total: 28.5 sq mi (73.8 km^{2})
  - Land: 28.0 sq mi (72.5 km^{2})
  - Water: 0.50 sq mi (1.3 km^{2})
- Elevation: 292 ft (89 m)

Population (2020)
  - Total: 239
  - Density: 8.54/sq mi (3.30/km^{2})
- Time zone: UTC-5 (Eastern (EST))
  - Summer (DST): UTC-4 (EDT)
- ZIP code: 05743
- Area code: 802
- FIPS code: 50-80875
- GNIS feature ID: 1462252
- Website: https://townofwesthavenvt.org/

West Haven is a town in Rutland County, Vermont, United States. The population was 239 at the 2020 census.

== Geography ==
According to the United States Census Bureau, the town has a total area of 28.5 square miles (74 km^{2}), of which 28.0 square miles (73 km^{2}) is land and 0.5 square miles (1.3 km^{2}), or 1.72%, is water.

== Demographics ==
Historical population
Census	Pop.	Note	%±
1800	430		—
1810	679		57.9%
1820	684		0.7%
1830	724		5.8%
1840	774		6.9%
1850	718		−7.2%
1860	580		−19.2%
1870	713		22.9%
1880	492		−31.0%
1890	412		−16.3%
1900	355		−13.8%
1910	363		2.3%
1920	343		−5.5%
1930	280		−18.4%
1940	302		7.9%
1950	232		−23.2%
1960	220		−5.2%
1970	240		9.1%
1980	253		5.4%
1990	273		7.9%
2000	278		1.8%
2010	264		−5.0%
2020	239		−9.5%
U.S. Decennial Census

As of the census of 2000, there were 278 people, 104 households, and 79 families residing in the town. The population density was 9.9 people per square mile (3.8/km^{2}). There were 118 housing units at an average density of 4.2 per square mile (1.6/km^{2}). The racial makeup of the town was 98.20% White, 0.72% African American, 0.36% Asian, and 0.72% from two or more races. Hispanic or Latino of any race were 0.36% of the population.

There were 104 households, out of which 30.8% had children under the age of 18 living with them, 65.4% were married couples living together, 8.7% had a female householder with no husband present, and 24.0% were non-families. 18.3% of all households were made up of individuals, and 8.7% had someone living alone who was 65 years of age or older. The average household size was 2.67 and the average family size was 3.06.

In the town, the population was spread out, with 22.7% under the age of 18, 6.5% from 18 to 24, 27.3% from 25 to 44, 31.7% from 45 to 64, and 11.9% who were 65 years of age or older. The median age was 41 years. For every 100 females, there were 98.6 males. For every 100 females age 18 and over, there were 92.0 males.

The median income for a household in the town was $45,417, and the median income for a family was $48,750. Males had a median income of $34,167 versus $25,313 for females. The per capita income for the town was $22,429. None of the families and 4.0% of the population were living below the poverty line, including no under eighteens and 11.4% of those over 64.
