= Stevens Branch =

River in the United States of America

Coordinates: 37°24′29″N 90°13′15″W

Stevens Branch is a stream in Madison County in the U.S. state of Missouri. It is a tributary of Shetley Creek.

Stevens Branch (historically spelled "Stephens Creek") has the name of Billy Stephens, an early settler.

== See also ==
- List of rivers of Missouri
