= Sutton, Quebec =

Sutton
- Town
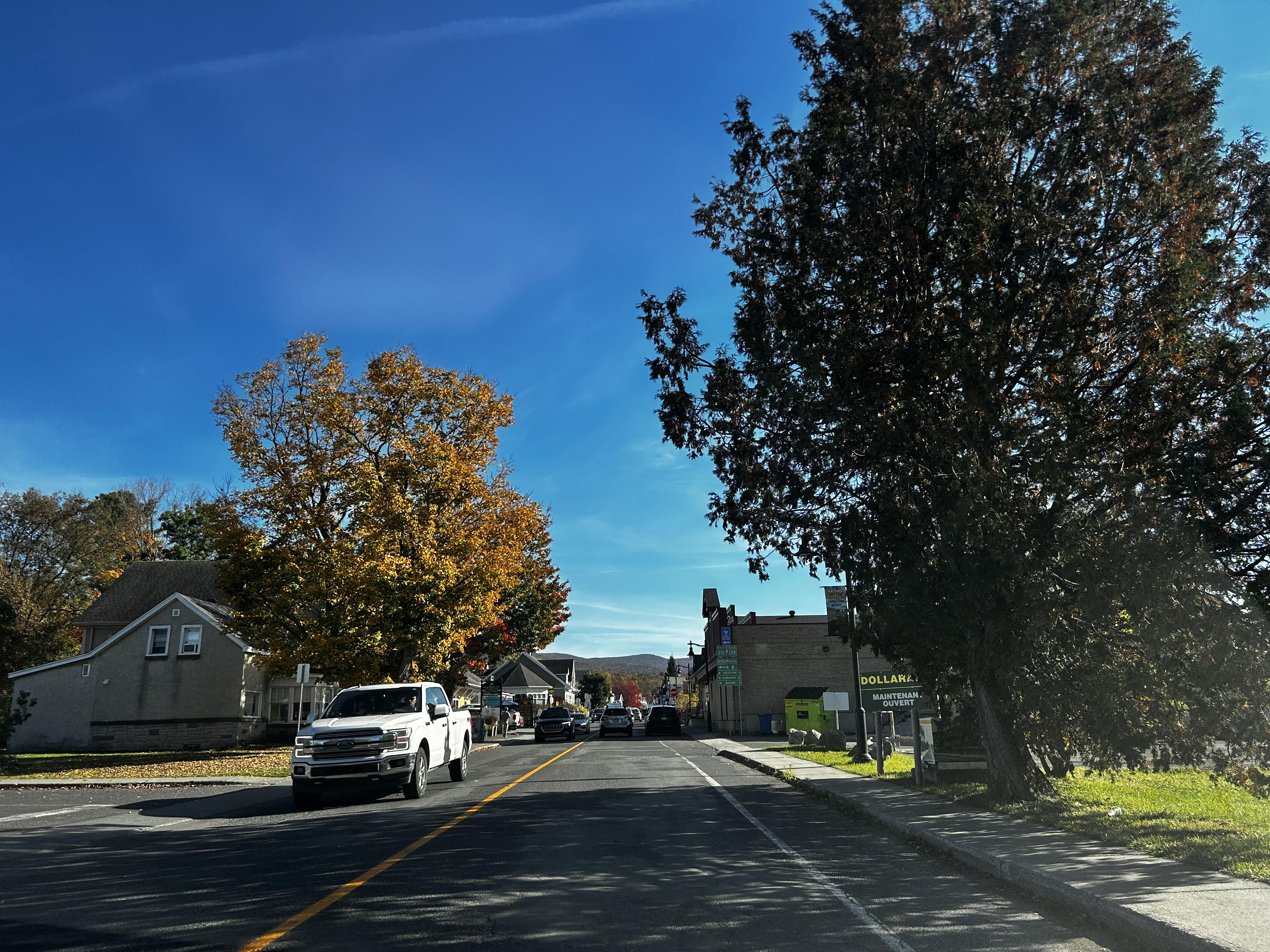
- Main Street (Quebec Route 139)

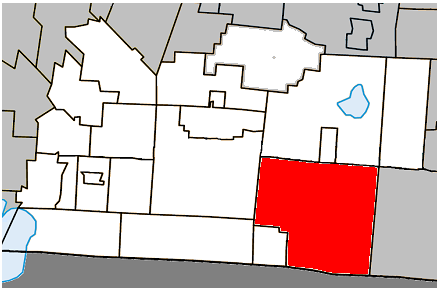
- Location within Brome-Missisquoi RCM.

- Location in southern Quebec.
- Coordinates: 45°06′N 72°37′W
- Country: Canada
- Province: Quebec
- Region: Estrie
- RCM: Brome-Missisquoi
- Settled: 1802
- Constituted: July 4, 2002

Government
  - Mayor: Robert Benoît
  - Federal riding: Brome—Missisquoi
  - Prov. riding: Brome-Missisquoi

Area
  - Total: 248.50 km^{2} (95.95 sq mi)
  - Land: 245.69 km^{2} (94.86 sq mi)

Population (2021)
  - Total: 4,548
  - Density: 18.5/km^{2} (48/sq mi)
  - Pop 2016-2021: ▲13.4%
  - Dwellings: 3,767
- Time zone: UTC−5 (EST)
  - Summer (DST): UTC−4 (EDT)
- Postal code(s): J0E 2K0
- Area codes: 450 and 579
- Highways: R-139; R-215
- Website: www.sutton.ca

Sutton is a town in southeastern Quebec. It is part of the Brome-Missisquoi Regional County Municipality in the administrative region of the Estrie. The population as of the Canada 2021 Census was 4,548. Known for its scenic landscapes and outdoor recreational activities, Sutton is part of the Eastern Townships and a popular destination for tourists.

== History ==
Like many other towns and villages in the Eastern Townships, Sutton became home to many United Empire Loyalists, following the American Revolution. In 1799 the first recorded Loyalists immigrated to the area, among them Richard Shepherd, originally of New Hampshire. During the 19th century, new buildings were erected to serve the town's growing population, among them a school in 1808 (on the road linking the town to nearby Abercorn) as well as the town hall built in 1859. In the decades that followed, Protestant and Roman Catholic churches were built as was a railway station.

Sutton became a municipality in 1892, and later a town in 1962. In 2002, the township of Sutton merged with the town of Sutton, roughly doubling the town's population, and vastly expanding the town's area. The economy has moved from one largely based on farming to one that is heavily reliant on tourism due to the opening of Sutton Ski Resort in 1960. Sutton is now a popular year-round destination for road and mountain biking, hiking, visits to vineyards and micro-breweries.

== Etymology ==
The name “Sutton” originates from the Anglo-Saxon language, a combination of two words: “sudh” or “suth”, and “tun”. “Sudh” or “suth” translates to “south”, while “tun” signifies a “town” or “settlement”. Thus, Sutton can be interpreted as “the southern town” or “southern settlement”. As this town is on the very south end of Quebec, it was named "Sutton" by English settlers.

Store fronts on Rue Principale on the corner with Rue Maple

== Geography ==
Sutton is near the Canada–United States border with Vermont, 110 kilometres (68 mi) southeast of Montreal, 400 kilometres (250 mi) northwest of Boston, Massachusetts and 90 kilometres (56 mi) west of Sherbrooke.

Mount Sutton, located in Sutton with an altitude of 3,176 feet, is known for its popular ski resort. The resort has 60 ski trails and 9 ski lifts, making it a destination for many skiers across Quebec, as well as from neighboring American states. Sommet Rond (Round top), the mountain where the resort is located, is 960 meters high, but the ski network itself reaches a height of 870 meters.

The municipality is bordered to the west by the Réserve Naturelle Montagnes Vertes which can be accessed by footpath provided by three separate organizations: Les sentiers du Corridor appalachien (Mont Singer to Mansonville), Les sentiers du Parc d'environnement naturel de Sutton (Round Top sector), Les sentiers de l’Estrie (Mont Echo sector or Bolton-Est to Mont Glen and Mont Singer). All three have an entry fee or membership obligation.

Climate data for Sutton
Month	Jan	Feb	Mar	Apr	May	Jun	Jul	Aug	Sep	Oct	Nov	Dec	Year
Record high °C (°F)	17.5 (63.5)	19.0 (66.2)	26.5 (79.7)	30.5 (86.9)	33.0 (91.4)	33.0 (91.4)	33.5 (92.3)	33.5 (92.3)	32.5 (90.5)	27.2 (81.0)	23 (73)	19 (66)	33.5 (92.3)
Mean daily maximum °C (°F)	−3.9 (25.0)	−2.3 (27.9)	2.8 (37.0)	10.8 (51.4)	18.6 (65.5)	22.9 (73.2)	25.3 (77.5)	24.3 (75.7)	20.3 (68.5)	13.1 (55.6)	5.9 (42.6)	−0.7 (30.7)	11.4 (52.5)
Daily mean °C (°F)	−8.9 (16.0)	−7.4 (18.7)	−2.0 (28.4)	5.8 (42.4)	12.8 (55.0)	17.4 (63.3)	19.7 (67.5)	19.0 (66.2)	14.9 (58.8)	8.5 (47.3)	2.0 (35.6)	−4.8 (23.4)	6.4 (43.5)
Mean daily minimum °C (°F)	−13.5 (7.7)	−12.3 (9.9)	−6.7 (19.9)	0.4 (32.7)	7.1 (44.8)	11.9 (53.4)	14.5 (58.1)	13.7 (56.7)	9.6 (49.3)	3.9 (39.0)	−2.1 (28.2)	−8.7 (16.3)	1.5 (34.7)
Record low °C (°F)	−36.5 (−33.7)	−36.5 (−33.7)	−29.5 (−21.1)	−16.5 (2.3)	−5.5 (22.1)	−2.5 (27.5)	2.5 (36.5)	1.0 (33.8)	−5.0 (23.0)	−8.5 (16.7)	−21.5 (−6.7)	−34.0 (−29.2)	−36.5 (−33.7)
Average precipitation mm (inches)	97.2 (3.83)	83.5 (3.29)	100.4 (3.95)	111.4 (4.39)	114.7 (4.52)	113.8 (4.48)	127.7 (5.03)	123.2 (4.85)	118.6 (4.67)	127.1 (5.00)	111.6 (4.39)	110.8 (4.36)	1,340.1 (52.76)
Average rainfall mm (inches)	34.8 (1.37)	20.9 (0.82)	41.6 (1.64)	85.5 (3.37)	112.1 (4.41)	113.8 (4.48)	127.7 (5.03)	123.3 (4.85)	118.6 (4.67)	117.9 (4.64)	77.6 (3.06)	45.1 (1.78)	1,018.9 (40.11)
Average snowfall cm (inches)	63.0 (24.8)	61.7 (24.3)	57.5 (22.6)	25.8 (10.2)	2.3 (0.9)	0.0 (0.0)	0.0 (0.0)	0.0 (0.0)	0.0 (0.0)	9.4 (3.7)	33.6 (13.2)	57.7 (22.7)	320.9 (126.3)
Average extreme snow depth cm (inches)	22 (8.7)	28 (11)	22 (8.7)	3 (1.2)	0 (0)	0 (0)	0 (0)	0 (0)	0 (0)	0 (0)	4 (1.6)	14 (5.5)	8 (3.1)
Average precipitation days (≥ 0.2. mm)	21.1	17.4	17.0	14.7	15.5	15.3	15.4	13.8	13.7	15.7	17.5	20.6	197.7
Average rainy days (≥ 0.2 mm)	5.6	4.1	7.4	12.0	15.3	15.3	15.4	13.8	13.6	14.9	11.6	7.1	136.1
Average snowy days (≥ 0.2 cm)	18.4	15.7	12.8	5.5	0.72	0.0	0.0	0.0	0.03	2.3	9.0	16.8	81.3

== Mayors of Sutton ==
- Robert Benoît (2021–Present)
- Michel Lafrance (2017-2021)
- Louis Dandenault (2013-2017)
- Pierre Pelland (2009-2013)
- Keneth Hill (2005-2009)
- Winston Bresee (2002-2005)
- Keneth Hill (1996-2002)

== Demographics ==
Historical Census Data - Sutton, Quebec
Year	Pop.	±%
1991	1,587	—
1996	1,617	+1.9%
2001	1,631	+0.9%
2002M	3,524	+116.1%
2006	3,805	+8.0%
2011	3,906	+2.7%
2016	4,012	+2.7%
2021	4,548	+13.4%
(M) merger with township of Sutton in 2002.

In the 2021 Census of Population conducted by Statistics Canada, Sutton had a population of 4,548 living in 2,388 of its 3,767 total private dwellings, a change of 13.4% from its 2016 population of 4,012. With a land area of 245.69 km^{2} (94.86 sq mi), it had a population density of 18.5/km^{2} (47.9/sq mi) in 2021.

According to 2021 Census data, Sutton has one of the highest median ages in Canada, at 60.4 years. A sizable percentage of the town's population is composed of artists, the highest proportion in Canada.

Canada census – Sutton, Quebec community profile

	2021	2016	2011
Population	4,548 (+13.4% from 2016)	4,012 (+2.7% from 2011)	3,906 (+2.7% from 2006)
Land area	245.69 km^{2} (94.86 sq mi)	245.95 km^{2} (94.96 sq mi)	246.54 km^{2} (95.19 sq mi)
Population density	18.5/km^{2} (48/sq mi)	16.3/km^{2} (42/sq mi)	15.8/km^{2} (41/sq mi)
Median age	60.4 (M: 60.4, F: 60.0)	58.3 (M: 57.7, F: 58.8)	54.8 (M: 54.9, F: 54.7)
Private dwellings	3,767 (total)	3,670 (total)	3,507 (total)
Median household income	$66,500	$55,680	$48,453

References: 2021 2016 2011

Canada Census Mother Tongue - Sutton, Quebec
Census	Total	French			English			French & English			Other		
Year	Responses	Count	Trend	Pop %	Count	Trend	Pop %	Count	Trend	Pop %	Count	Trend	Pop %
2021	4,485	3,075	▲22.0%	68.6%	1,060	▼4.9%	23.6%	130	▲73.3%	2.9%	200	0.0%	4.5%
2016	3,925	2,520	▲9.8%	64.2%	1,115	▼11.2%	28.4%	75	0.0%	1.9%	200	▲5.3%	5.1%
2011	3,815	2,295	▼1.9%	60.2%	1,255	▲8.2%	32.9%	75	▲7.1%	2.0%	190	▲15.2%	5.0%
2006	3,735	2,340	▲205.9%	62.7%	1,160	▲60.0%	31.1%	70	▲133.3%	1.9%	165	▲312.5%	4.4%
2001	1,560	765	▲4.1%	49.0%	725	▲6.6%	46.5%	30	▼60.0%	1.9%	40	▼20.0%	2.6%
1996	1,540	735	n/a	47.7%	680	n/a	44.2%	75	n/a	4.9%	50	n/a	3.3%

Like many other communities in the southwestern quadrant of the province, Sutton has historically been an anglophone enclave in a predominantly francophone province. Today anglophones make up only 24% of the population, compared to 69% for francophones and 5% for allophones.

Due to a large Swiss population in the town, Sutton has many people who speak German. Every year Swiss National Day is celebrated at Mont Sutton ski resort on the last Saturday in July.

== Transportation ==
The railways had a significant effect on Sutton and the region.

== See also ==
- List of anglophone communities in Quebec
- List of cities in Quebec
- 21st-century municipal history of Quebec
- Sutton River, a river of Quebec and Vermont
