= Lake Eden =

Lake in Alberta, Canada

- Location within Alberta
- Location: Parkland County, Alberta
- Coordinates: 53°34′52″N 114°09′18″W
- Catchment area: 1.5 km^{2} (0.58 sq mi)
- Basin countries: Canada
- Max. length: 1 km (0.62 mi)
- Max. width: 1 km (0.62 mi)
- Surface area: 0.161 km^{2} (0.062 sq mi)
- Average depth: ~6.95 m (22.8 ft)
- Max. depth: ~15.3 m (50 ft)
- Shore length^{1}: 4.5 km (2.8 mi)
- Surface elevation: 735.9 m (2,414 ft)
- Settlements: Stony Plain
- ^{1} Shore length is not a well-defined measure.

Lake Eden (also referred to as Eden Lake) is a small, recreational lake in Alberta, Canada. It lies 10 kilometres (6.2 mi) west of Stony Plain, Alberta. It has an area of 0.161 km^{2} (0.062 sq mi), and has a mean depth of only ~6.95 m (22.8 ft), with clear water.

== History ==
In the early 1950s it was named Lake Eden by the owners of the Lake Eden Fur Farm, whose farm sat adjacent to the lake.
