= Lowell, Vermont =

- Town
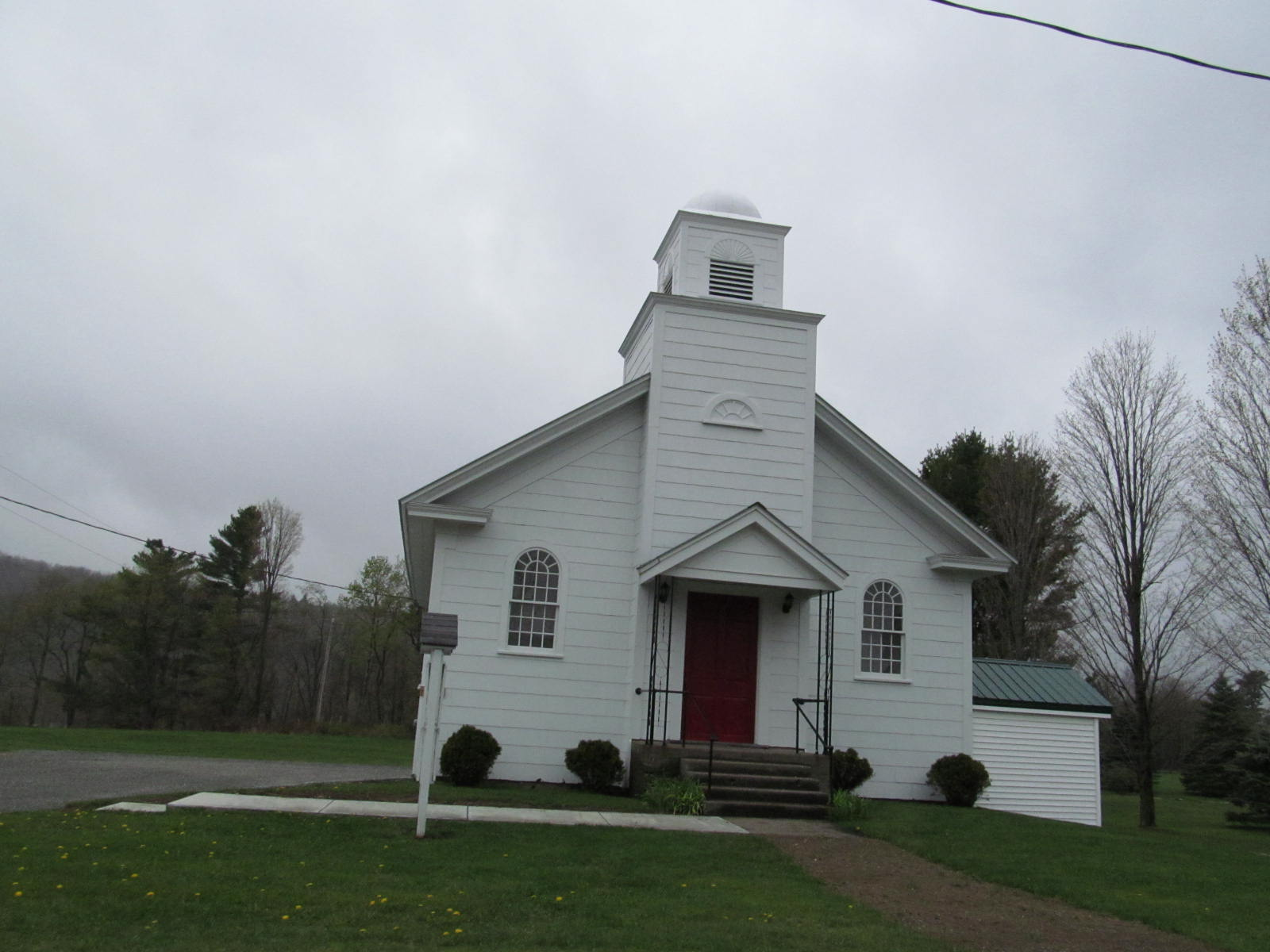

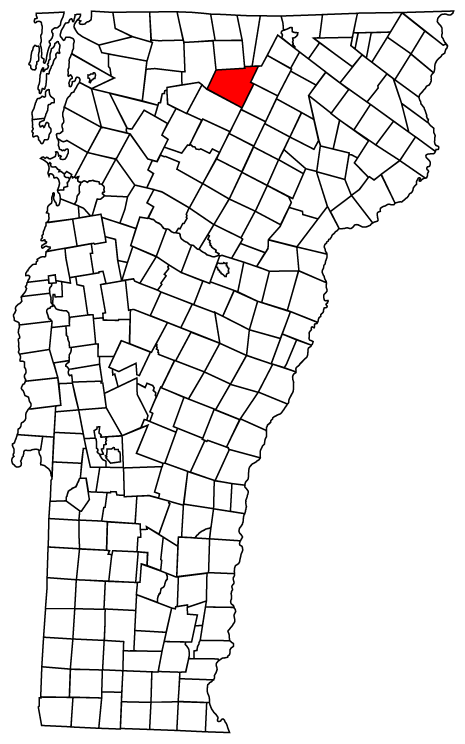
- Located in Orleans County, Vermont
- Coordinates: 44°47′42″N 72°27′25″W
- Country: United States
- State: Vermont
- County: Orleans
- Chartered: February 7, 1791
- Communities: Lowell

Area
  - Total: 56.1 sq mi (145.2 km^{2})
  - Land: 56.0 sq mi (145.1 km^{2})
  - Water: 0.039 sq mi (0.1 km^{2})
- Elevation: 1,030 ft (310 m)

Population (2020)
  - Total: 887
  - Density: 16/sq mi (6.1/km^{2})
- Time zone: UTC-5 (EST)
  - Summer (DST): UTC-4 (EDT)
- ZIP code: 05847
- Area code: 802
- FIPS code: 50-40525
- GNIS feature ID: 1462137
- Website: www.townoflowell.org

Lowell is the westernmost town in Orleans County, Vermont, United States. The population was 887 at the 2020 census.

== Geography ==
According to the United States Census Bureau, the town has a total area of 56.1 square miles (145.2 km^{2}), of which 56.0 square miles (145.1 km^{2}) is land and 0.1 square mile (0.2 km^{2}) (0.11%) is water. The unincorporated village of Lowell is in the center of the town.

=== Geology ===
Circa 400 million years ago, large and slow moving upheavals formed the serpentine rock and the asbestos fiber which sometimes accompanies serpentine. This serpentine comprises Brown's Ledges at the Lowell-Westfield border. A rare fern species, Adiantum viridimontanum, grows which can tolerate the high nickel content of serpentine. Serpentine also contains iron, so much so that some rocks can be magnetized. This affects where cell towers can be placed in town. The iron oxide gives the color brown to "Brown's Ledges."

The major Baie Verte fault line runs through Lowell. The Burgess branch of the river follows the fault with serpentine rocks on one side and nonserpentine rocks on the other.

The Lowell (chrysotile) quarry on Belvidere Mountain was the last asbestos mine to operate in the Eastern U.S. It closed in 1993.

== History ==
Lowell was chartered in 1787 by Governor Thomas Chittenden to John Kelley in 1787, for whom it was named Kellyvale. The first people other than the Native Americans to come to Lowell was in 1778 when the area was surveyed, preparatory to Col. John Hazen constructing a road to Canada for military purposes. This road was abandoned at what is now named Hazen’s Notch on Route 58.

The first settlers were Major Caldwell and family from Barre, Massachusetts in 1806. The town was formally organized in 1812, the same year the first school began with twelve students.

The presence of asbestos was first noted in 1824.

In 1831 the name was changed to Lowell; the origin remains uncertain.

The town grew from 144 people in 1820 with an average age of 17, to 413 in 1840 with an average age of 12.

By 1840 Churches had been built and Methodist, Congregational, Baptist and Roman Catholic services were being held.

During the first half of the nineteenth century, the population inflow was predominantly from other states of the US. In the second half the new arrivals were more often foreign-born - from Ireland and from French-speaking Canada. By 1870 the population was 944 and it reached its peak in 1890 when it stood at 1,178. Farming and lumber were its main economic base. Dairy products and hardwood were both exported to other states. Silsby and Company lumber mill closed in the 1920s. This loss of jobs resulted in a population drop of 40% between 1920 and 1940.

Several tons of asbestos were mined in 1870. By 1910, Lowell produced half the asbestos mined in the United States.

Lumber exports stopped by 1930. Farming has experienced a slow but steady decline since 1930 or so. Consistent with all of Vermont’s Northeast Kingdom, Lowell lost population throughout most of the twentieth century. This trend reversed in the mid-1980s.

The asbestos mine in Lowell was of economic importance from the 1940s to the mid-1980s. In the mid-1940s, the Belvidere mines produced more than 90% of all U.S. asbestos. In 1967, the mine produced 50,000 short tons (45,000 t) of asbestos fiber [sic] annually. It closed in 1992.

The Shortsleve Mink Farm was located here.

In 2008, the town supported the Democratic candidate for president 225 to 151, yet voted for the local Republican challenger for the Vermont Legislature 229 to 79 to 71 (three parties).

In 2008, the state warned residents of the town and nearby towns that there was a "health risk" for people living within a 10-mile (16 km) radius of the asbestos mine on Belvidere Mountain. Above ground mill tailings were estimated at 16,000,000 cubic yards (12,000,000 m^{3}). In April 2009, the Vermont Department of Health released a revised study which found that all deaths related to the asbestos mine were caused by occupational exposure. The report also concluded that people living near the mines had no increased risk of asbestos-related illness than people living anywhere else in Vermont. However, the site will still need to be cleaned up. In 2009, the expected cost of cleanup was $300 million.

In 2012 Kingdom Community Wind, built by Green Mountain Power in cooperation with Vermont Electric Cooperative, began operation. With a nameplate capacity of over 63 MW, the 21 turbines produce enough power to meet the annual needs of over 24,000 average Vermont residences, and is the largest wind farm in the state of Vermont.

== Demographics ==
Historical population
| Census | Pop. | Note | %± |
|---|---|---|---|
| 1820 | 144 | | — |
| 1830 | 314 | | 118.1% |
| 1840 | 431 | | 37.3% |
| 1850 | 637 | | 47.8% |
| 1860 | 813 | | 27.6% |
| 1870 | 942 | | 15.9% |
| 1880 | 1,067 | | 13.3% |
| 1890 | 1,178 | | 10.4% |
| 1900 | 983 | | −16.6% |
| 1910 | 1,086 | | 10.5% |
| 1920 | 1,005 | | −7.5% |
| 1930 | 725 | | −27.9% |
| 1940 | 615 | | −15.2% |
| 1950 | 643 | | 4.6% |
| 1960 | 617 | | −4.0% |
| 1970 | 515 | | −16.5% |
| 1980 | 573 | | 11.3% |
| 1990 | 594 | | 3.7% |
| 2000 | 738 | | 24.2% |
| 2010 | 879 | | 19.1% |
| 2020 | 887 | | 0.9% |
U.S. Decennial Census

As of the census of 2000, there were 738 people, 270 households, and 204 families residing in the town. The population density was 13.2 people per square mile (5.1/km^{2}). There were 403 housing units at an average density of 7.2 per square mile (2.8/km^{2}). The racial makeup of the town was 97.97% White, 1.22% African American, 0.68% Native American, and 0.14% from two or more races. Hispanic or Latino of any race were 1.22% of the population.

There were 270 households, out of which 38.5% had children under the age of 18 living with them, 62.6% were married couples living together, 7.4% had a female householder with no husband present, and 24.4% were non-families. 19.3% of all households were made up of individuals, and 8.1% had someone living alone who was 65 years of age or older. The average household size was 2.73 and the average family size was 3.12.

In the town, the population was distributed by age with 29.4% under of 18, 6.8% from 18 to 24, 29.4% from 25 to 44, 23.4% from 45 to 64, and 11.0% who were 65 years of age or older. The median age was 35 years. For every 100 females, there were 103.3 males. For every 100 females age 18 and over, there were 102.7 males.

The median income for a household in the town was $27,969, and the median income for a family was $29,408. Males had a median income of $25,446 versus $21,083 for females. The per capita income for the town was $12,404. About 18.8% of families and 17.5% of the population were below the poverty line, including 13.8% of those under age 18 and 15.7% of those age 65 or over.

Since the 1980s, the population has expanded. A number of the residents are in agriculture. Most commute to work. A few are engaged in home-based occupations.

== Local government ==
=== Town ===
- Town Clerk – Christy M. Pion
- Treasurer – Rebecca DiZazzo
- Road Commissioner – Calvin Allen

=== School District ===
- Budget – $1,199,600
- Principal – Anita Gagner
- School Board Members – Steven Mason, Chair – Jason Blay, Member – David Legacy, Member

Lowell Graded School offers Pre-K–8. There are 119 students. 56 students from Lowell attend North Country Union High School.

== Notable people ==
- Frederick W. Baldwin, attorney and politician who served as President pro tempore of the Vermont Senate
- John C. Caldwell, teacher, diplomat, and Civil War general
- Donald Collins, member of the Vermont Senate
- Edgar S. Coolidge, farmer and legislator
