= Missisquoi Bay =

- Map of Lake Champlain with Missisquoi Bay in North-East area of the lake.

- Location within Quebec
- Location: Venise-en-Québec
- Coordinates: 45°01′12″N 73°08′42″W
- Type: Bay
- Part of: Champlain Lake
- Primary inflows: Rivière aux Brochets (baie Missisquoi) Pikes River (Missisquoi Bay)
- Primary outflows: Champlain Lake and Richelieu River
- Basin countries: Canada; United States
- Max. length: 5 km (3.1 mi)
- Max. depth: 4.75 m (15.6 ft)

Missisquoi Bay is a large extension in the northern part of Lake Champlain, at the East of the output of the latter in Richelieu River. It takes the form of a violin head, with the neck extending from the head of the lake and is about 5 kilometres (3.1 mi) in diameter. The bay is divided between Quebec in Canada and Vermont in the United States. The main town on its banks is Venise-en-Québec, a major summer resort. The river of the same name flows into the bay and the Missisquoi National Wildlife Refuge is located on the American side.

== Toponymy ==
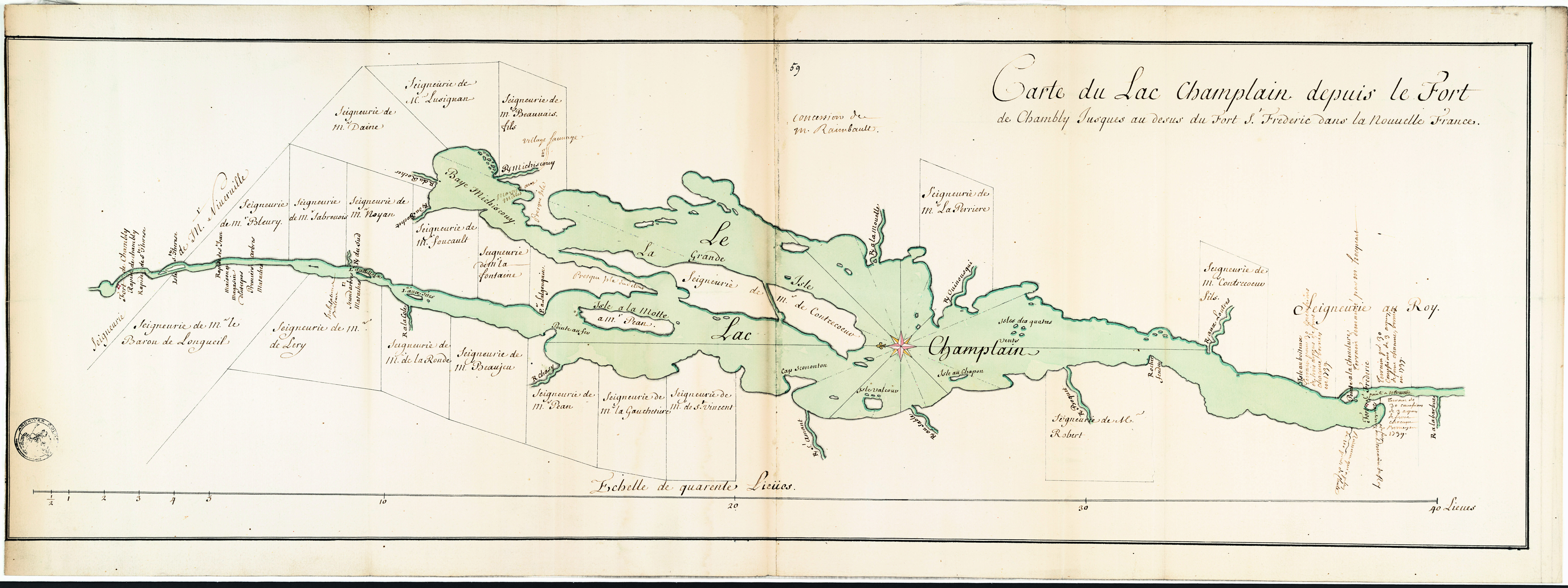
"Map of Lake Champlain from Fort Chambly seen over Fort St Frederic, in New France". Cadastral map showing concessions and seigneuries on the lake following the boundary of 1739; indication of the course of water and rapids. This card identifies the Michiscouy Bay and the lordships bordering the bay, including that of Mr de Lusignan.

Champlain, first governor of New France, was the first European to visit the region. The name has an Abenaki origin, meaning "a lot of waterfowl" but other meanings are also thought possible. It appears officially in the eighteenth century in the concession document made on April 6, 1733 to Paul-Louis de Lusignan Dazemard as the "Missiskouy Bay". The spelling has changed several times. In 1855, when changes to electoral counties of Lower Canada into electoral districts, the Legislature finally adopts the form Missisquoi to designate the county and the region.

== Geology ==
Glaciers grounded in the Bay 18,000 years ago and then melted there forming the Champlain Sea approximately 8,000 years ago. The maximum depth of the bay is about 4.75 m and its bottom is made of regional marine deposits. The bay waters drain south into the Champlain Lake and the Richelieu River. Until the late 2000s, the water of the bay was stagnant and the bay was dying. At the opening of the new bridge on the US side, the old road causeway was partly demolished which brought a flow of fresh water from Lake Champlain.

== Environment ==
The bay has a great diversity of fauna and flora, including many species of birds, hence the establishment of a national refuge on the US side. Its beaches are very popular with vacationers in summer and its waters attract various activities, especially personal watercraft, boats, etc. In winter, anglers engage in ice fishing activity.

== See also ==
- Pike River (Missisquoi Bay), a stream (fr: Rivière aux Brochets (baie Missisquoi)
- Pike River North (Missisquoi Bay), a stream (fr: Rivière aux Brochets (baie Missisquoi)
- Richelieu River, a stream
- Lake Champlain, a body of water
- Rivière-aux-Brochets Ecological Reserve, a bay
