= Vermont Route 104 =

State highway in Vermont, US

Vermont Route 104
- Map of northwestern Vermont with VT 104 highlighted in red

Route information
- Maintained by VTrans
- Length: 20.503 mi (32.996 km)

Major junctions
- South end: VT 15 in Cambridge
- North end: VT 105 in St. Albans

Location
- Country: United States
- State: Vermont
- Counties: Lamoille, Franklin

Highway system
- State highways in Vermont
← VT 103A	→ VT 104B

Vermont Route 104 (VT 104) is a state highway in the U.S. state of Vermont. The highway runs 20.503 miles (32.996 km) from VT 15 in Cambridge to VT 105 in the town of St. Albans. VT 104 is an L-shaped route that connects the city of St. Albans and Cambridge via Fairfax. The highway has an auxiliary route, VT 104A, that connects Fairfax and Georgia to the west.

== Route description ==
VT 104 begins at an intersection with VT 15 in the town of Cambridge. The two-lane highway heads west parallel to the Lamoille River and crosses the Lamoille–Franklin county line into the town of Fairfax, where the highway is named Main Street. VT 104 crosses Beaver Creek and continues west between the south town line and the river to the north. South of the center of town, the highway curves north and meets the northern end of VT 128 (Browns River Road) at a tangent intersection. VT 104 passes through the town center between its bridges over the Lamoille River and Mill Brook; just south of the latter bridge, the route intersects Maple Street, which leads to the Maple Street Covered Bridge. The highway continues northwest and crosses Tracy Book and Swift Brook on either side of its junction with VT 104A (Highbridge Road), which leads west toward Interstate 89 (I-89) in Georgia.

Near the northwest corner of Fairfax, VT 104 curves west and crosses the Mill River between the two St. Albans reservoirs. The highway passes under I-89 with no access then curves north to parallel the Interstate, during which the route briefly veers to the west of the town line into Georgia. After the short second stint through Fairfax, VT 104 briefly passes through the southwest corner of Fairfield before entering the town of St. Albans, where the highway is named Fairfax Road. The highway crosses Ruggs Brook and briefly becomes a divided highway around its intersection with St. Albans State Highway, a connector between U.S. Route 7 (US 7) in the south end of the city of St. Albans and a trumpet interchange with I-89 immediately to the east of VT 104. VT 104 continues north as Fisher Pond Road beyond its intersection with VT 36 (Fairfield Hill Road) and crosses Stevens Brook. The highway crosses over to the east side of I-89, crosses Hungerford Brook, and reaches its northern terminus at a T-intersection with VT 105 (Sheldon Road), which heads west toward the city of St. Albans and northeast toward Sheldon.

== Major intersections ==
County	Location	mi	km	Destinations	Notes
Lamoille	Cambridge	0.000	0.000	VT 15 – Cambridge, Jeffersonville, Underhill, Essex Junction	Southern terminus
Franklin	Fairfax	6.520	10.493	VT 128 south (Browns River Road) – Westford, Essex Center	Northern terminus of VT 128
Franklin	Fairfax	8.866	14.268	VT 104A west (Highbridge Road) to I-89	Eastern terminus of VT 104A
Franklin	Town of St. Albans	17.977	28.931	St. Albans State Highway to US 7 / I-89 – St. Albans	Exit 19 on I-89
Franklin	Town of St. Albans	18.624	29.972	VT 36 (Fairfield Hill Road) – Fairfield, Bakersfield	
Franklin	Town of St. Albans	20.503	32.996	VT 105 (Sheldon Road) – St. Albans, Sheldon Junction, Enosburg Falls	Northern terminus
1.000 mi = 1.609 km; 1.000 km = 0.621 mi

== Auxiliary route ==
Vermont Route 104A
- Location: Georgia–Fairfax
- Length: 4.527 mi (7.286 km)

Vermont Route 104A (VT 104A) is a 4.527-mile-long (7.286 km) auxiliary route of VT 104 that runs from US 7 in Georgia east to VT 104 in Fairfax. The two-lane highway, which is named Highbridge Road in both towns, begins at US 7 (Ethan Allen Highway) south of the U.S. Highway's interchange with I-89 in Georgia. VT 104A bypasses a loop of Highbridge Road and crosses an arm of Arrowhead Mountain Lake, an impoundment of the Lamoille River. The highway follows the right bank of the river, passes the historic Kemp-Shepard House, and passes under the New England Central Railroad. VT 104A crosses Beaver Meadow Brook and veers away from the river as it enters the town of Fairfax. The highway crosses Swift Brook immediately before it reaches its eastern terminus at VT 104 (Main Street).
