= The finger =

Obscene raising of the middle finger

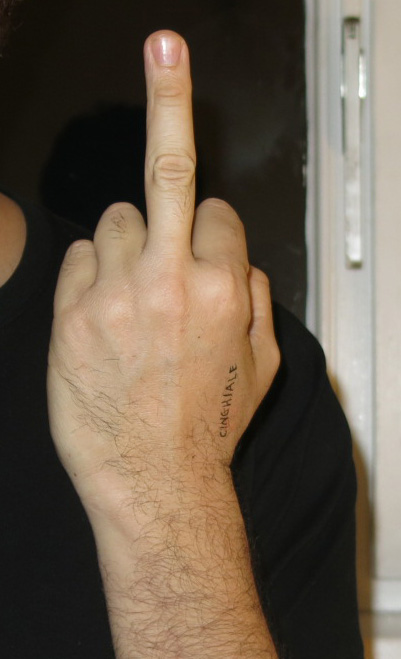
An example of "giving the middle finger"

Giving someone the (middle) finger, also known as flipping the bird or flipping someone off, is an obscene hand gesture. The gesture communicates moderate to extreme contempt, and is roughly equivalent in meaning to "fuck you", "fuck off", "go fuck yourself", "shove it up your ass/arse" or "up yours". It is performed by showing the back of a hand that has only the middle finger extended upwards, though in some locales, the thumb is extended. Extending the finger is considered a symbol of contempt in several cultures, especially in the Western world. Many cultures use similar gestures to display their disrespect, although others use them to express pointing without intentional disrespect. The gesture is usually used to express contempt, but can also be used humorously or playfully.

The gesture dates back to ancient Greece, and it was also used in ancient Rome. Historically, it represented a phallus. In the early 19th century, it gained increasing recognition as a sign of disrespect and was used by music artists (notably more common among actors, celebrities, athletes, and politicians; most still view the gesture as obscene). In more contemporary periods, the bent index and ring fingers on each side of the middle finger have been likened to represent the testicles.

== Classical era ==
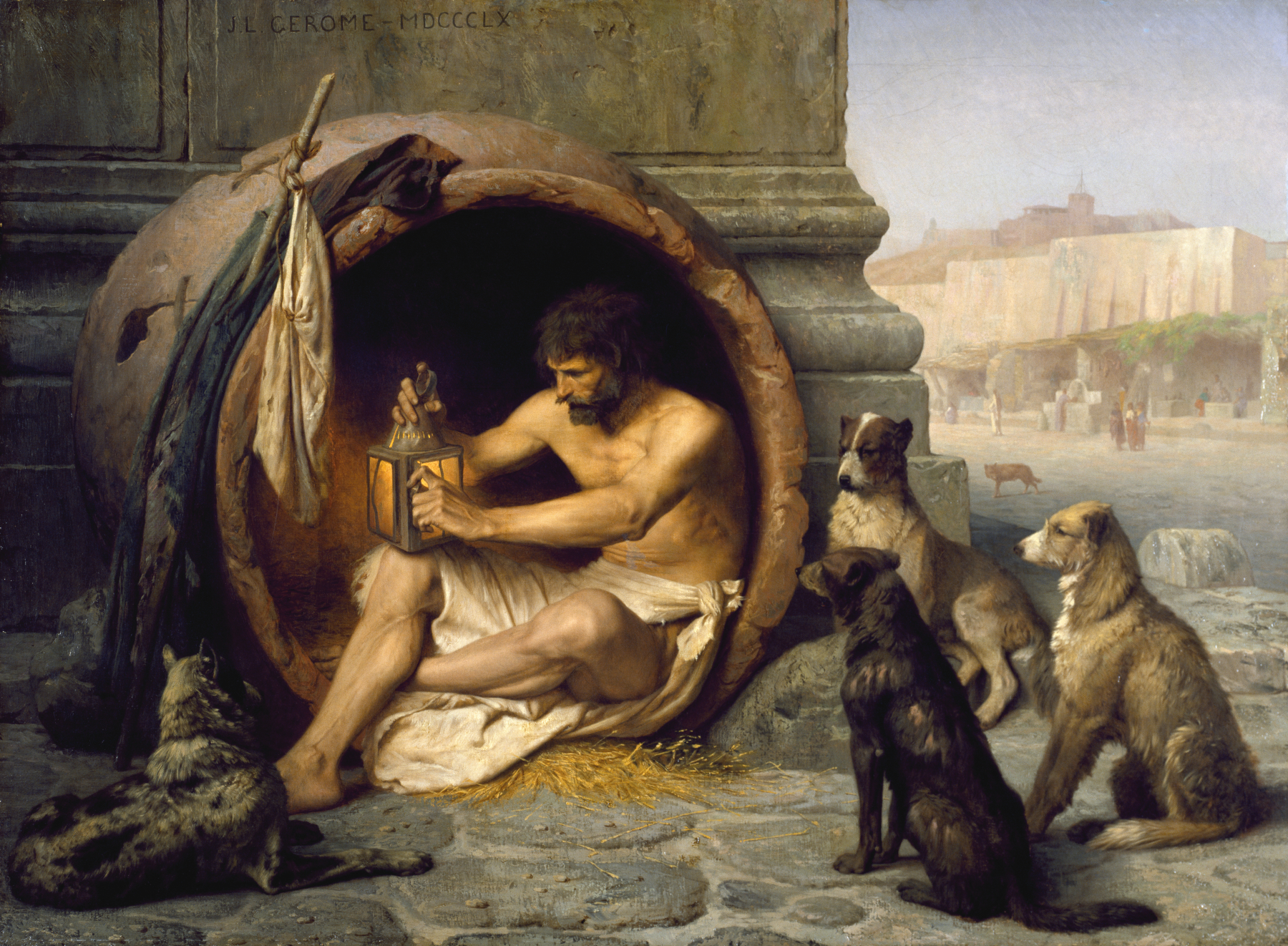
The Cynic philosopher Diogenes, pictured by Gérôme with the large jar in which he lived; when strangers at the inn were expressing their wish to catch sight of the great orator Demosthenes, Diogenes is said to have stuck out his middle finger and exclaimed "This, for you, is the demagogue of the Athenians."

The middle finger gesture was used in ancient times as a symbol of sexual intercourse, in a manner meant to degrade, intimidate, and threaten the individual receiving the gesture. It also represented the phallus, with the fingers next to the middle finger representing testicles; from its close association, the gesture may have assumed apotropaic potency. In the 1st-century Mediterranean world, extending the finger was one of many methods used to divert the ever-present threat of the evil eye.

In Greek, the gesture was known as the katápygon (κατάπυγον, from kata – κατά, "downwards" and pugē – πυγή, "rump, buttocks"). In ancient Greek comedy, the finger was a gesture of insult toward another person, with the term katapugon also referring to "a male who submits to anal penetration" or katapygaina to a female. In Aristophanes's comedy The Clouds (423 BC), when the character Socrates is quizzing his student on poetic meters, Strepsiades declares that he knows quite well what a dactyl is, and gives the finger. The gesture is a visual pun on the two meanings of the Greek word daktylos, both "finger" and the rhythmic measure composed of a long syllable and two short, like the joints of a finger (^{— ‿ ‿}, which also appears as a visual pun on the penis and testicles in a medieval Latin text). Socrates called one who made the gesture "boorish and stupid." The gesture recurs as a form of mockery in Peace, alongside farting in someone's face. The usage is later explained in the Suda and included in the Adagia of Erasmus. The verb "to play the Siphnian" appears in a fragment of Aristophanes and has a similar meaning. The usage is once again explained in the Suda, where it is said to mean "to touch the anus with a finger." Diogenes Laërtius records how the Cynic philosopher Diogenes of Sinope directed the gesture at the orator Demosthenes in 4th-century BC Athens. In the Discourses of Epictetus, Diogenes's target is instead one of the sophists.

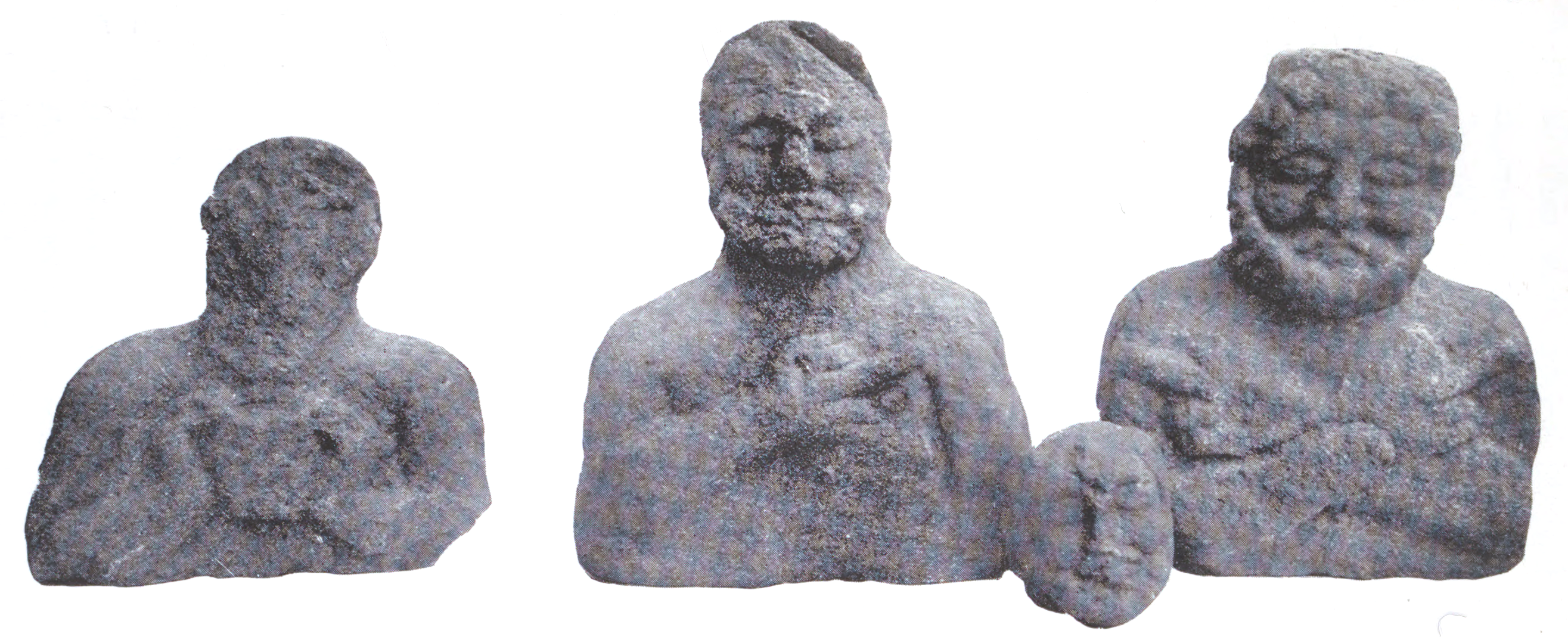
Roman stone busts from Bar Hill Fort, Scotland. Silenus and a bearded man with middle finger extended in the "infamis digitus" to ward off the evil eye. A video of the figure on the right has been made.

In Latin, the middle finger was the digitus impudicus, meaning the "shameless, indecent or offensive finger". In the 1st century AD, Persius had superstitious female relatives concoct a charm with the "infamous finger" (digitus infamis) and "purifying spit" while in the Satyricon, an old woman uses dust, spit and her middle finger to mark the forehead before casting a spell. The poet Martial has a character in good health extend "the indecent one" toward three doctors. In another epigram, Martial wrote: "Laugh loud, Sextillus, at whoever calls you a cinaedus and extend your middle finger." Juvenal, through synecdoche, has the "middle nail" cocked at threatening Fortuna. The indecent finger features again in a mocking context in the Priapeia, a collection of poems relating to the phallic god Priapus. In Late Antiquity, the term "shameless finger" is explained in the Etymologiae of Isidore of Seville with reference to its frequent use when accusing someone of a "shameful action."

== Modern era ==
=== United States ===
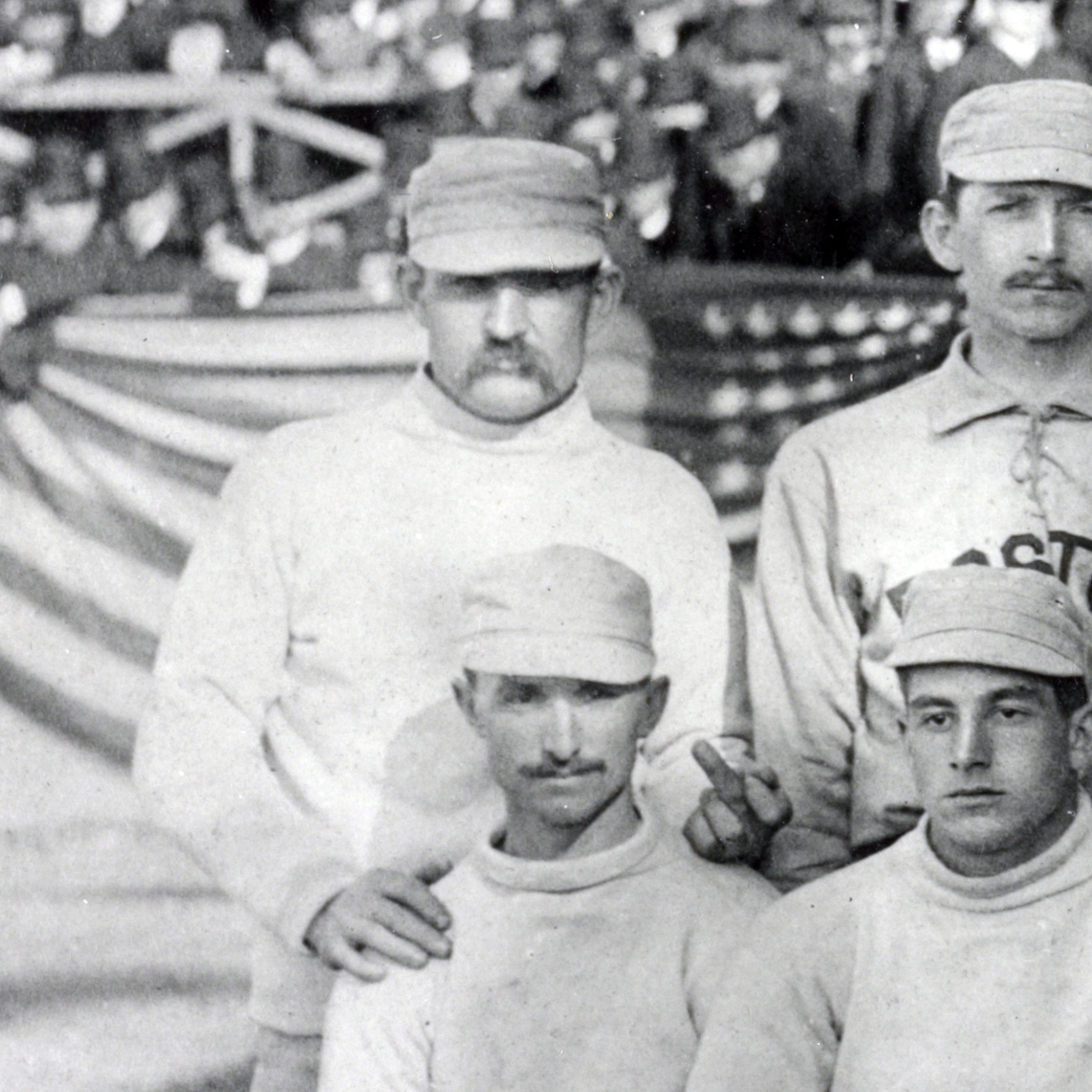
Boston Braves baseball pitcher Charles "Old Hoss" Radbourn pictured giving the finger to the cameraman, 1886. First known photograph of the gesture.

Linguist Jesse Sheidlower traces the gesture's development in the United States to the 1890s. According to anthropologist Desmond Morris, the gesture probably came to the United States via Italian immigrants. The first documented appearance of the finger in the United States was in 1886, when Old Hoss Radbourn, a baseball pitcher for the Boston Beaneaters, was photographed giving it to a member of their rival the New York Giants.

Use of this gesture in public, while vulgar, is legal, as it is considered expressive communication protected by the First Amendment. In some cases, offended police officers who have had the insulting gesture displayed to them have stopped, ticketed, or arrested people for doing so. However, it is neither a crime nor even probable cause to stop a person, and a police officer who does so violates "a clearly established constitutional right", and does not have qualified immunity if they do so, which means they can be sued for monetary damages for the unlawful stop and/or arrest. Cruise-Gulyas v. Minard 918 F.3d 494 (2019).

=== Canada ===
In 2023, in a ruling issued February 24 regarding a Canadian man who was accused of criminal harassment and uttering threats, Quebec court Judge Dennis Galiatsatos wrote, "To be abundantly clear, it is not a crime to give someone the finger", and, "Flipping the proverbial bird is a God-given, Charter-enshrined right that belongs to every red-blooded Canadian. It may not be civil, it may not be polite, it may not be gentlemanly. Nevertheless, it does not trigger criminal liability." The accused man was acquitted.

=== Early appearance in films ===
During a wedding sequence in one of Alfred Hitchcock's silent films, The Ring (1927), a misunderstanding results in the ringbearer giving the finger to another member of the wedding party, to comedic effect.

In the film Speedy (1928), Harold Lloyd's character gives himself the finger into a distorting mirror at Luna Park, about 25 minutes into the film.

== Political and military use ==
The gesture has been involved in political events. During the USS Pueblo incident, in which an American ship was captured by North Korea, the captured American crewmembers often discreetly gave the finger in staged photo ops, undermining the North Koreans' use of the images in their propaganda. The North Koreans, ignorant of what the gesture meant, were at first told by the prisoners that it was a "Hawaiian good luck sign", similar to the shaka. When the guards finally figured things out, the crewmembers were subjected to extremely severe beatings. Abbie Hoffman used the gesture at the 1968 Democratic National Convention. Ronald Reagan, while serving as the Governor of California, gave the middle finger to counterculture protesters in Berkeley, California. Nelson Rockefeller, then the Vice President of the United States, directed the gesture to hecklers at a 1976 campaign stop near Binghamton, New York, leading it to be called the "Rockefeller gesture". In 1982, Pierre Trudeau, then the Prime Minister of Canada, gave the finger to protesters in Salmon Arm, British Columbia, earning the incident the nickname the "Salmon Arm salute". The gesture itself has also been nicknamed the "Trudeau salute". Former president George W. Bush gave the finger to the camera at an Austin production facility during his term as governor of Texas, saying it was "just a one-finger victory salute." Anthony Weiner gave the finger to reporters after leaving his election headquarters the night he lost the 2013 primary election for Mayor of New York City. During the campaign for the 2013 German federal election, the leading candidate of the Social Democratic Party of Germany, Peer Steinbrück controversially gave the finger in a photo interview with Süddeutsche Zeitung's Magazin supplement.

During World War II, the 91st Bombardment Group of the United States Army Air Forces referred to the gesture as the "rigid digit" salute. It was used in a more jocular manner, to suggest an airman had committed an error or infraction; the term was a reference to British slang terms for inattentiveness (i.e. "pull your finger out (of your bum)"). The "order of the rigid digit" continued after the war as a series of awards presented by the veteran's association of the 91st, marked by wooden statuettes of a hand giving the single finger gesture. In 2005, during the war in Iraq, Gunnery Sergeant Michael Burghardt gained prominence when the Omaha World-Herald published a photo of Burghardt making the gesture towards Iraqi insurgents he believed to be watching after an improvised explosive device failed to kill him.

The middle finger has been involved in judicial hearings. An appellate court in Hartford, Connecticut ruled in 1976 that gesturing with the middle finger was offensive, but not obscene, after a police officer charged a 16-year-old with making an obscene gesture when the student gave the officer the middle finger. The case was appealed to the Connecticut Supreme Court, which upheld the decision. In March 2006, a federal lawsuit was filed regarding the free speech issue.

Giving the finger has resulted in negative consequences. A Malaysian man was bludgeoned to death after giving the finger to a motorist following a car chase. A Pakistani man was deported by the United Arab Emirates for the gesture, which violates indecency codes.

People have given the finger as a method of political protest. At a concert, Ricky Martin gave a picture of George W. Bush the finger to protest the War in Iraq. Serbian protesters gave the finger to the Russian embassy regarding their support of Slobodan Milošević. Artist Ai Weiwei has used the finger in photographs and sculptures as a political statement. As a political message to the Czech President Miloš Zeman, Czech artist David Černý floated an outsize, purple statue of a hand on the River Vltava in Prague; its middle finger extended towards Prague Castle, the Presidential seat. Černý had also mounted a middle finger on a pink former Soviet tank from the Monument to Soviet Tank Crews in 1991. In 2011–2012, the pink tank with the finger was displayed again on a barge on the Vltava.

In 2017, Juli Briskman gave the finger to the motorcade of Donald Trump as it drove past her while bicycling, and a photograph that went viral forced her to resign from her job as a marketing executive. However, the notoriety may have been favorable in her 2019 election to the board of supervisors for Loudoun County, Virginia.

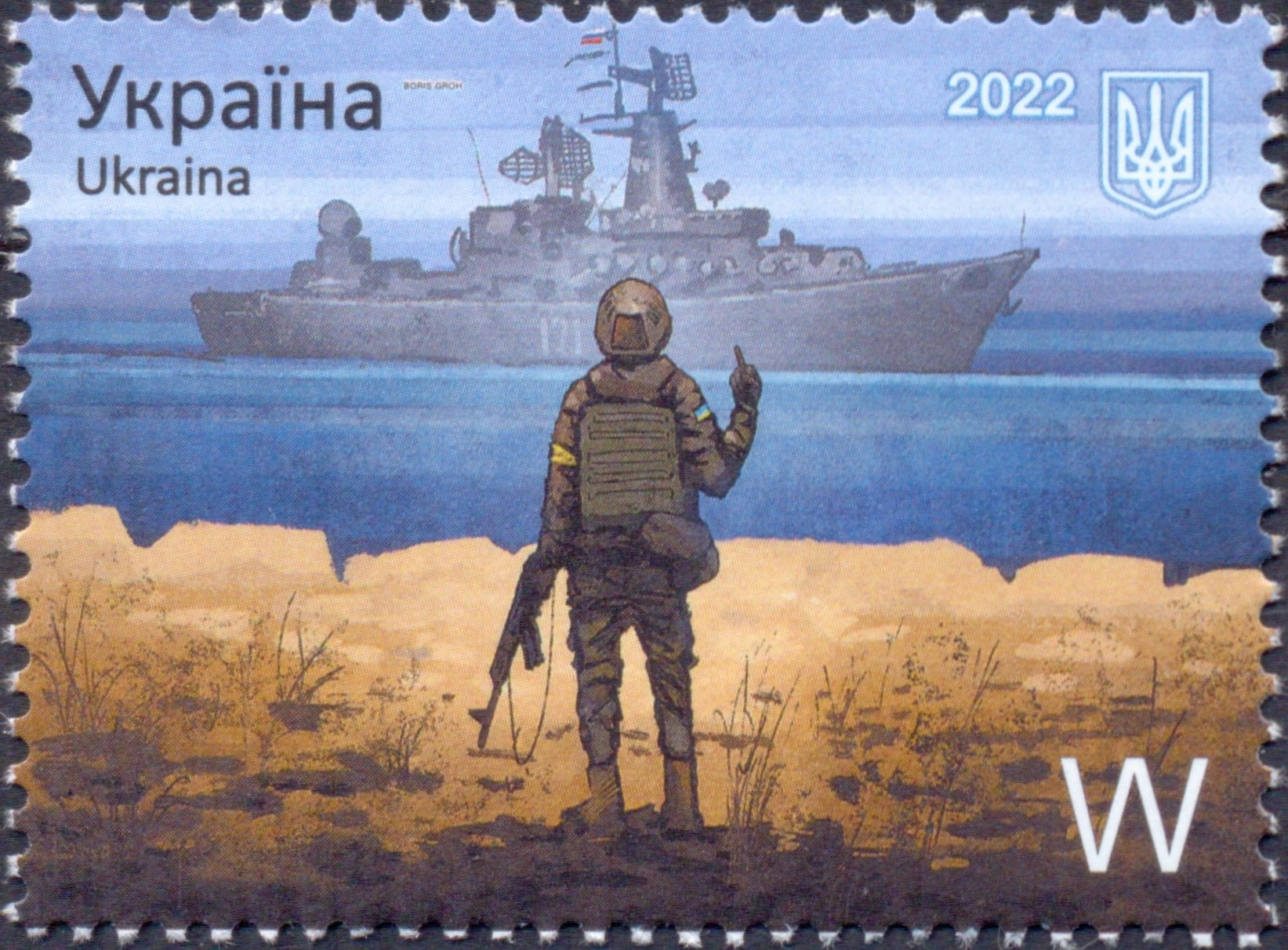
Ukrainian postage stamp featuring a Ukrainian soldier in battle dress flipping off the Moskva

On February 24, 2022, the first day of the Russian invasion of Ukraine, the Russian missile cruiser Moskva attacked Snake Island as part of the 2022 Snake Island campaign. The Ukrainian border guard Roman Hrybov's last communication with the warship was "Russian warship, go fuck yourself". This was memorialized on a set of Ukrainian commemorative postage stamps on April 12 with the text "Russian warship, fuck you!" and a drawing of a Ukrainian soldier presenting the middle finger to the Russian cruiser.

In January 2026, U.S. President Donald Trump was filmed raising his middle finger and mouthing "fuck you" toward a heckler who had shouted "pedophile protector" during a visit to the Ford River Rouge complex in Dearborn, Michigan. A White House spokesperson described the response as appropriate.

== In popular culture ==
The use of the middle finger has become pervasive in popular culture. The band Cobra Starship released a song called "Middle Finger", and released a music video that showed people giving the finger. Italian artist Maurizio Cattelan installed a marble statue of a middle finger called L.O.V.E, measuring 11 m (36 feet) and located directly in front of the Milan Stock Exchange. A now-famous photograph of Johnny Cash shows him giving the middle finger to a photographer during a 1969 concert at San Quentin State Prison, released as At San Quentin. However, the photo remained fairly obscure until 1998, when producer Rick Rubin made it the centerpiece of an ad in Billboard criticizing country radio for not giving airplay to Cash's Grammy-winning album Unchained. Cameron Diaz made the gesture during a photo shoot for Esquire. Harold Lloyd shot the finger to his own reflection in a Coney Island funhouse after getting paint on his suit in Speedy, his final silent feature, from 1928.

Athletes, including Stefan Effenberg, Ron Artest, Luis Suárez, Virat Kohli, Juan Pablo Montoya, Iván Rodríguez, Danny Graves, Jack McDowell, Natasha Zvereva, Josh Smith, Bryan Cox, and Johnny Manziel have been suspended or fined for making the gesture. José Paniagua was released by the Chicago White Sox after giving the middle finger to an umpire; he never played in the majors again. Baseball executive Chub Feeney once resigned after giving the finger to fans on Fan Appreciation Night. Bud Adams, owner of the National Football League's Tennessee Titans, was fined US$250,000 for giving both middle fingers to the fans of the Buffalo Bills during a game. Professional wrestler Stone Cold Steve Austin is also famous for flashing one or both middle fingers as part of his gimmick. Hockey star Jaromír Jágr made the gesture several times following goals in the early 1990s.

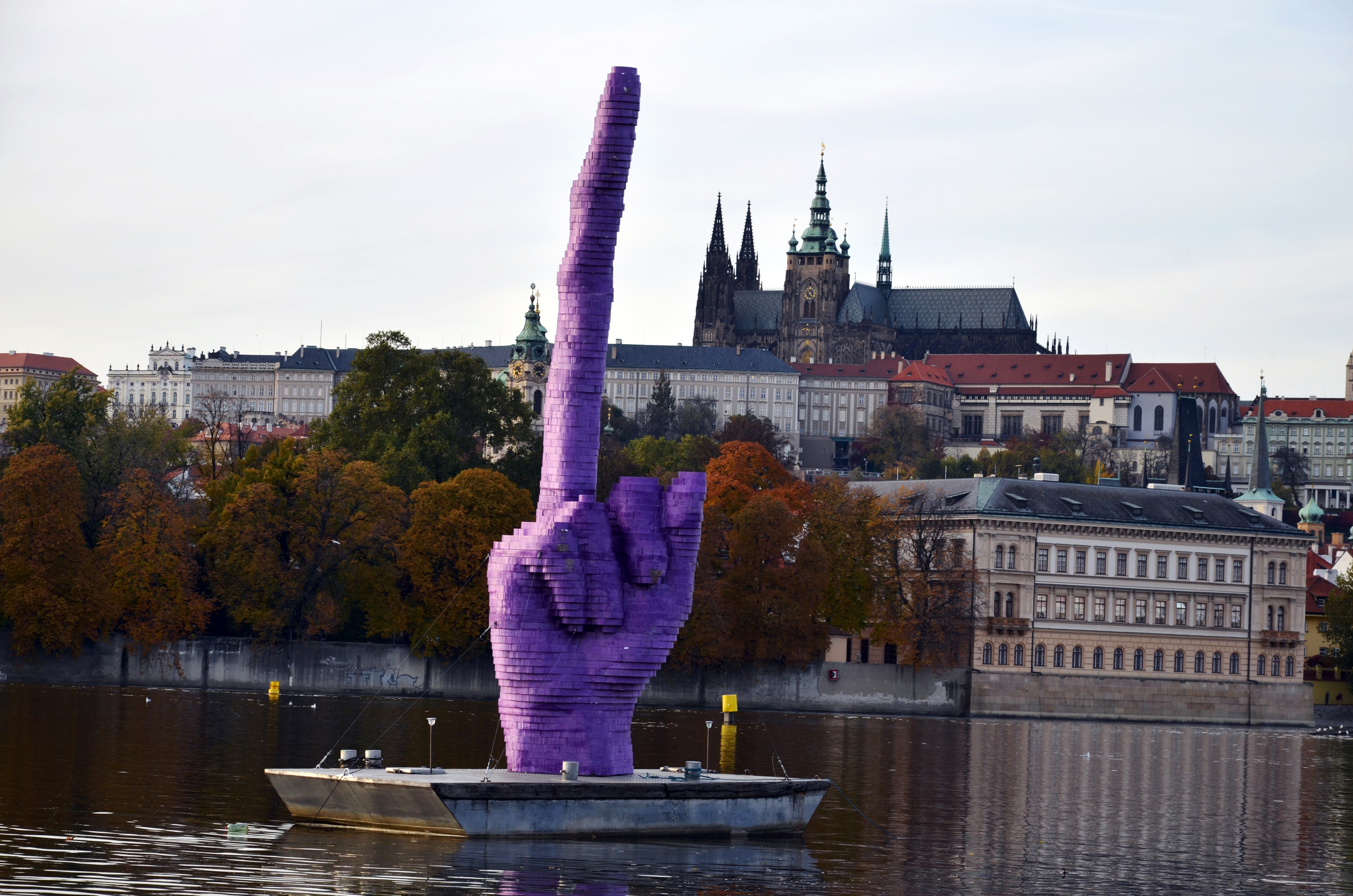
A message on the Vltava river under Prague Castle from the Czech sculptor David Černý to president Miloš Zeman before the 2013 parliamentary election in the Czech Republic

The NME Awards, an annual music awards show in the UK, uses an extended middle finger design in the trophy handed out to the winners. Many musical artists, including Madonna, Lady Gaga, Eminem, Ariana Grande, Katy Perry, and Adele have publicly made the gesture. Britney Spears and Iggy Azalea have given the gesture towards members of the paparazzi, but had to apologize when fans interpreted the gesture as directed at them. M.I.A. gave the gesture during the Super Bowl XLVI Halftime Show. The National Football League, NBC, and M.I.A. apologized. The CD itself for Kid Rock's album Devil Without a Cause is a picture of his raised middle finger. On the cover of Moby Grape's first album, Moby Grape, band member Don Stevenson was caught flipping the bird at the camera. The finger was airbrushed out of subsequent releases of the album.

In automobile driving culture, giving the finger to a fellow motorist communicates displeasure at another person's reckless driving habits and/or their disregard for common courtesy.

The finger is included in Unicode as U+1F595 🖕 REVERSED HAND WITH MIDDLE FINGER EXTENDED, part of the Miscellaneous Symbols and Pictographs block.

The media sometimes refers to the gesture as being mistaken for an indication of "we're number one", typically indicated with a raised index finger. Sometimes, though, the "mistake" is actually an intentional euphemism meant to indirectly convey the gesture in a medium where a direct description would be inappropriate. For example, Don Meredith famously noted in a 1972 Monday Night Football game describing the finger of a dejected Houston Oilers fan: "He thinks they're number one in the nation." In 1983, WABC-TV reporter Mara Wolynski was suspended after viewers saw her making the gesture to an unknown crew member on set. Later on, anchor Roger Grimsby quipped "As Mara Wolynski would say, 'we're number one.'" Ira P. Robbins, a law professor, believes the finger is no longer an obscene gesture. Psychologist David Walsh, founder of the National Institute on Media and the Family, sees the growing acceptance of the middle finger as a sign of the growth of a "culture of disrespect".

Google Street View's picture of the area around the Wisconsin Governor's Mansion, taken in 2011 during the tenure of Scott Walker, shows a jogger giving the finger in the direction of the mansion.

In 2018, a large wooden sculpture of a hand giving the middle finger, titled The Finger, was erected in Westford, Vermont by local Ted Pelkey as a form of protest against the local development review board for denying him a building permit. While WCAX described the public reaction to The Finger as "mixed", The Boston Globe reported Westfield residents being mostly amused by the sculpture and several proposing capitalizing on its popularity. Pelkey initially said he would retire The Finger to the garage or his living room and replace it with a peace sign if he received his permit, but later said the sculpture was "awesome" and "a statement made to our rights as Americans" and he would not remove it.

== Similar gestures ==
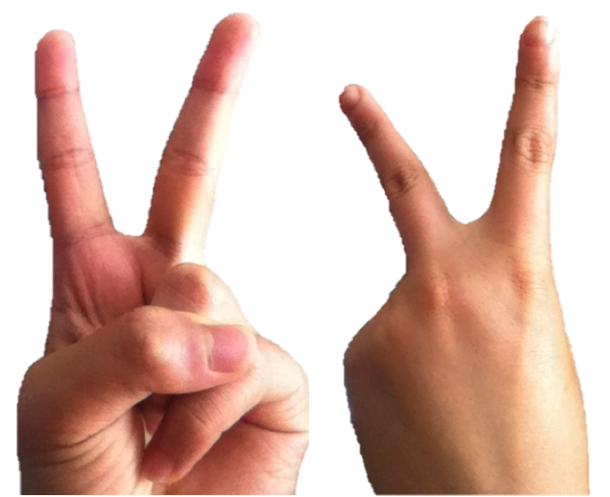
The hand gesture on the left is the normal "victory" symbol. The gesture on the right is the rude gesture.

In the United Kingdom, Ireland, Australia and New Zealand, the V sign, "two-fingered salute" or "the fingers", when given with back of the hand towards the recipient, serves a similar purpose. According to a Royal Shakespeare Company synopsis of the play Henry V, a "two-fingered salute" appeared in the Macclesfield Psalter of c. 1330 (in the Fitzwilliam Museum, Cambridge), "being made by a glove in the psalter's marginalia". George H. W. Bush, former President of the United States, accidentally made the gesture while on a diplomatic trip to Australia.

In countries where Spanish, Portuguese or French are spoken, and especially in Spain, Portugal, Brazil and France, the gesture involving raising a fist and slapping the biceps on the same arm as the fist used, sometimes called the bras d'honneur (French), corte de mangas (Spanish), manguito (Portugal), dar uma banana (Brazil), or Iberian slap, is equivalent to the finger.

More commonly in Turkish or Slavic regions, the fig sign (also known as nah or shish) serves as the equivalent to the finger, meaning "you won't get it" or "in your dreams". The gesture is typically made with the hand and fingers curled and the thumb thrust between the middle and index fingers. This gesture is also used similarly in Indonesia, Turkey and China.

In Japanese Sign Language, this same gesture (with all fingers curled inward except the middle one) means the following: elder brother (hand moving up), younger brother (hand moving down), and siblings in general (one hand moving up, one moving down). This comes from a childish name of the middle finger, o-nii-san-yubi ("big-brother finger"), as opposed to o-tō-san-yubi ("dad finger", the thumb), o-kā-san-yubi ("mom finger", the index), o-nee-san-yubi ("big-sister finger", the ring finger) and aka-chan-yubi ("baby finger", the pinky). The equivalent words for sisters are expressed with the pinky. In the Japanese manual syllabary, the middle finger (with the front of the hand facing forward) stands for the kana せ (which, incidentally, is also an archaic word for "brother").

== See also ==
- Articulatory gestures
- Dulya (Fig sign)
- List of gestures – List of bodily actions used as nonverbal communication
- List of sign languages
- Manual communication – Communication using hand gestures
- Mooning – Display of the buttocks
- Mountza – Obscene gesture in Greece
- Non verbal communication – Interpersonal communication through wordless (mostly visual) cues
- Obscene gesture – Expression of contempt
- OK gesture – Hand gesture
- Shaka sign – Hand gesture
- Shocker (gesture) – Obscene hand gesture
- Sign of the Horns – Hand gesture
- V sign or "the fingers"
- Wanker – Insult
