= Brigham Academy =

- U.S. National Register of Historic Places
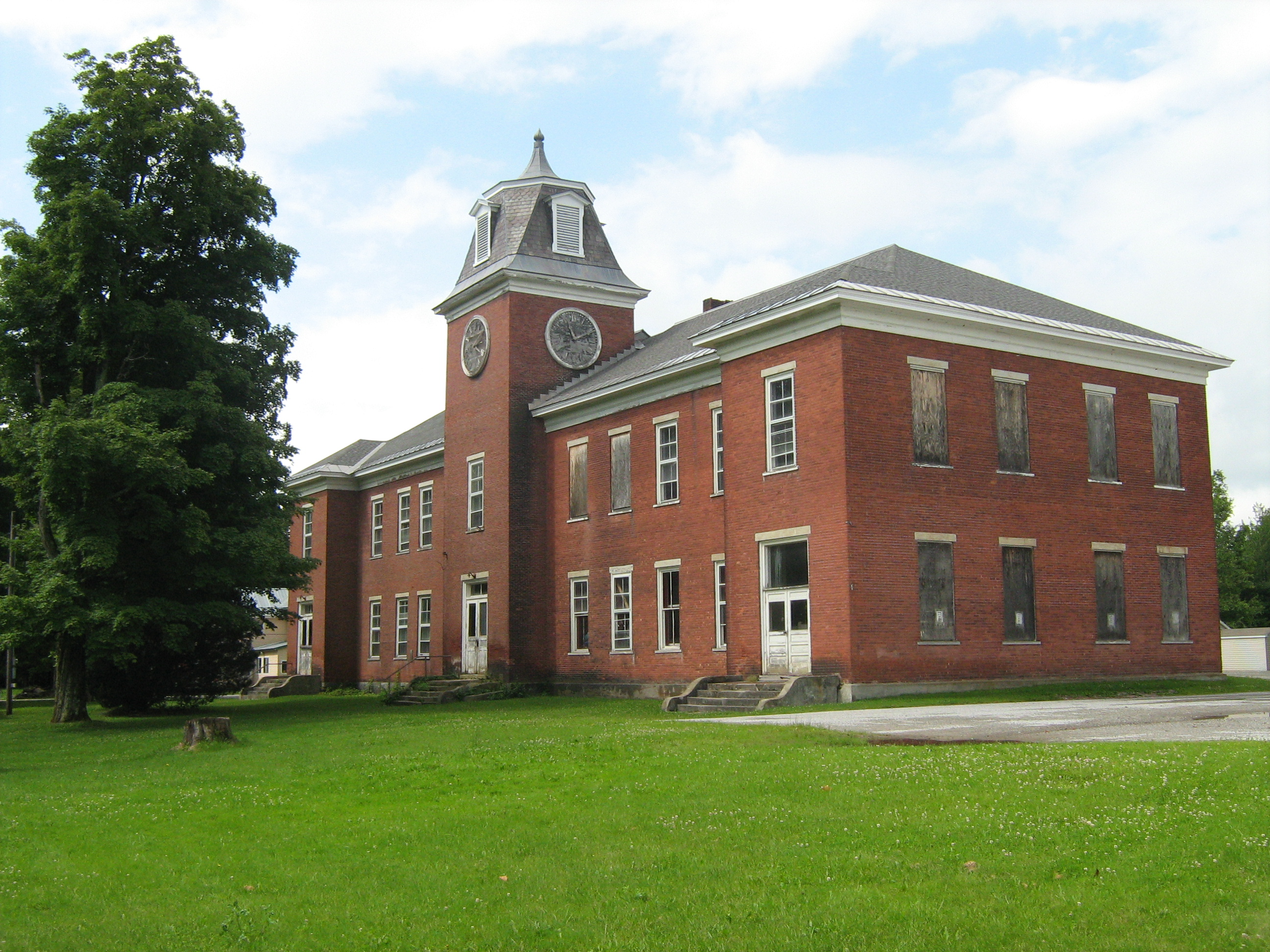

- Location within Vermont Location within the United States
- Location: Jct. of VT 108 and Academy Rd., Bakersfield, Vermont
- Coordinates: 44°47′1″N 72°48′10″W
- Area: less than one acre
- Built: 1878
- Architect: Sweat, Ira; Goff, A. H.
- Architectural style: Second Empire
- MPS: Educational Resources of Vermont MPS
- NRHP reference No.: 95001428
- Added to NRHP: December 13, 1995

Brigham Academy is a historic school in Bakersfield, Vermont, United States. It was established in 1878 by the town after receiving a gift from philanthropist and native son Peter Bent Brigham, and served as a major regional secondary school until 1966. Its original building, a fine work of Second Empire architecture, was listed on the National Register of Historic Places in 1995.

== Architecture and history ==
The former Brigham Academy building stands in the village of Bakersfield, adjacent to the town's modern primary school on the north side of Academy Lane. It is set well back from Vermont Route 108, which runs north-south to its east. It is a two-story brick building, thirteen bays wide and four deep, covered by a hip roof. The end bays project slightly, as does the central bay, from which a tower rises 3-1/2 stories to a mansard-roofed peak. Clock faces are set in the front and sides of the square tower, and its mansard roof has gabled louvers in each face. Windows are set in rectangular openings with granite sills and lintels, and the entrances are located in the three projecting portions. The interior is largely reflective of a 1901 addition and renovation.

Peter Bent Brigham was a Bakersfield native who made a fortune in the Boston area in real estate and restaurants, bequested his home town with $30,000 for educational purposes upon his death in 1877. Brigham is best known for founding one of the institutions later merged to form Boston's Brigham and Women's Hospital. The town spent over $7,000 to build the academy, saving the rest of his bequest as an endowment. The school became a regional magnet, drawing students from across northern Vermont. It served as a high school until 1966, and reopened after two years of major repairs in 1968 as a middle school. It served the town in that capacity until 1986, when the adjacent elementary/middle school was opened.

== See also ==
- National Register of Historic Places listings in Franklin County, Vermont
