= Maple Street Covered Bridge =

Bridge in Fairfax, Vermont, US

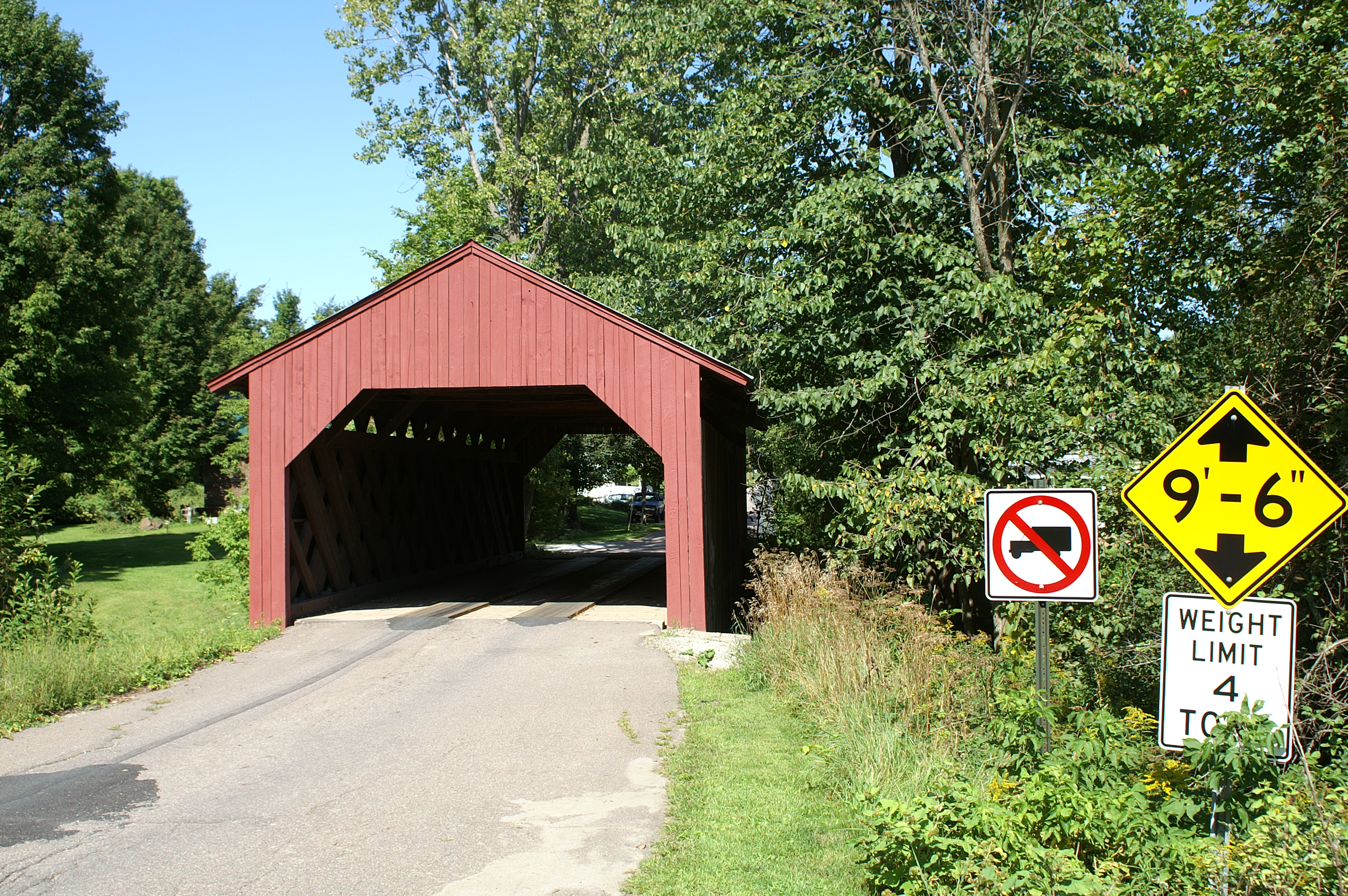
- Bridge in U.S. state of Vermont
- Coordinates: 44°39′49″N 73°00′37″W
- Carries: Maple Street
- Crosses: Mill Brook
- Locale: Fairfax, Vermont
- Maintained by: Town of Fairfax
- ID number: VT-06-02

Characteristics
- Design: Covered, Town lattice
- Material: Wood
- Total length: 56.8 ft (17.31 m)
- Width: 17.3 ft (5.27 m)
- No. of spans: 1
- Load limit: 4 tons
- Clearance above: 9.5 ft (2.90 m)

History
- Constructed by: Kingsbury and Stone
- Construction end: 1865
- Maple Street Covered Bridge
- U.S. National Register of Historic Places
- Location within Vermont Location within the United States
- Coordinates: 44.66359°N 73.0104°W
- Area: 1 acre (0.4 ha)
- NRHP reference No.: 74000215
- Added to NRHP: November 5, 1974

The Maple Street Covered Bridge, also called the Lower Covered Bridge and the Fairfax Covered Bridge, is a covered bridge that carries Maple Street across Mill Brook off State Route 104 in Fairfax, Vermont. Built in 1865, it is the town's only historic covered bridge, and is a rare two-lane covered bridge in the state. It was listed on the National Register of Historic Places in 1974.

== Description and history ==
The Maple Street Covered Bridge is located on the south side of Fairfax village, carrying Maple Street across Mill Brook, a tributary of the nearby Lamoille River, between the village center and Bellows Free Academy. The bridge is a single-span structure of Town lattice design, set on abutments of stone and concrete. It is 56.5 feet (17.2 m) long and 20.5 feet (6.2 m) wide, with a roadway width of 17.5 feet (5.3 m). Iron tie rods join the tops of the flanking trusses to provide lateral stability, and the bridge deck is made of wooden planking. The exterior is clad in vertical board siding, which ends short of the eaves on the sides. The siding extends a short way on the interior of each portal.

The bridge was built in 1865 by Kingsbury and Stone. It is the town's only surviving 19th-century covered bridge, and is rare in the state as an example of a two-lane bridge, built to accommodate significant village traffic. A major renovation was conducted in 1990-1991 by Jan Lewandoski. Debate is conducted to this day as to whether the bridge is now "backwards". When it was washed off its foundations by the Flood of 1927 it is unknown whether the bridge was put back on in the same direction as it was originally. Some say the eastern portal now faces west, and vice versa.

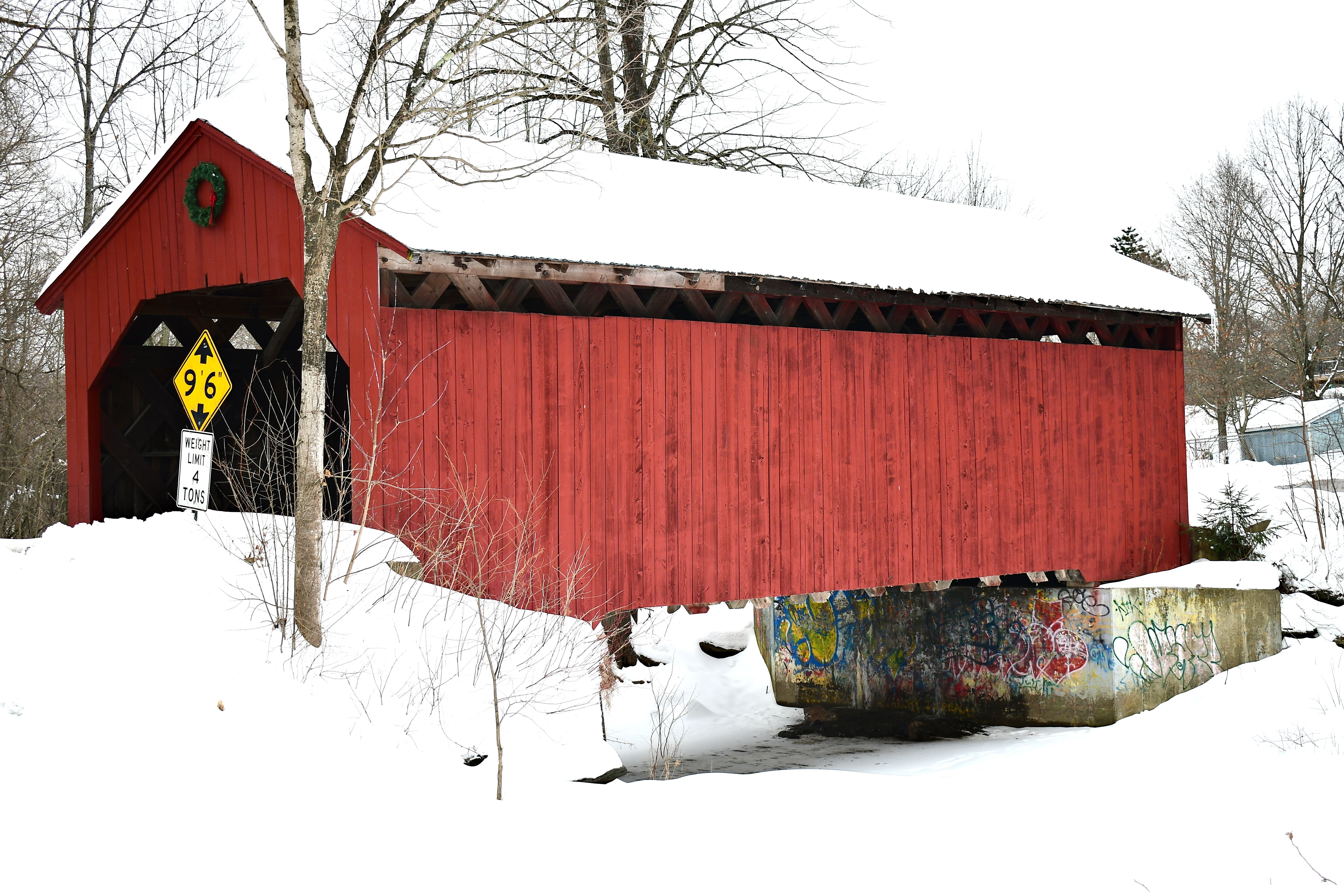

== See also ==
- List of covered bridges in Vermont
- National Register of Historic Places listings in Franklin County, Vermont
- List of bridges on the National Register of Historic Places in Vermont
