= Vermont Route 36 =

State highway in Franklin County, Vermont, US

Vermont Route 36
- Chester A. Arthur Memorial Highway
- VT 36 highlighted in red

Route information
- Maintained by VTrans
- Length: 29.431 mi (47.365 km)

Major junctions
- West end: VT 78 in Swanton
- US 7 in St. Albans
- East end: VT 108 in Bakersfield

Location
- Country: United States
- State: Vermont
- Counties: Franklin

Highway system
- State highways in Vermont
← VT 35	→ VT 38

Vermont Route 36 (VT 36) is a 29.431-mile-long (47.365 km) state highway in Franklin County, Vermont, United States. It is an L-shaped highway running south and east from VT 78 in the village of Swanton in the north to VT 108 in the town of Bakersfield in the east. The portion from St. Albans Bay State Park to the eastern terminus in Bakersfield is maintained by the state, while the north–south portion is a town highway minor collector (route number 786).

== Route description ==
VT 36 begins at an intersection with VT 78 in the village of Swanton, two blocks from VT 78's intersection with U.S. Route 7. VT 36 runs south along the eastern edge of Lake Champlain for approximately 5 miles (8.0 km), then turns eastward towards the city of St. Albans. The route briefly overlaps US 7 in the center of the city, and about a half-mile (0.8 km) later, intersects VT 104, a state highway providing access to Interstate 89 via exit 19. VT 36 proceeds east out of the city and into the mountains. It passes through the towns of Fairfield and East Fairfield and ends at an intersection with VT 108 in Bakersfield.

== Major intersections ==
The entire route is in Franklin County.

Location	mi	km	Destinations	Notes
Village of Swanton	0.000	0.000	VT 78 to I-89 / US 7	Western terminus
Town of St. Albans	5.990	9.640	Lower Newton Road	To VT 38
City of St. Albans	13.902	22.373	US 7 north to I-89 north	Western end of concurrency with US 7
City of St. Albans	13.930	22.418	US 7 south to VT 104 – Fairfax, Jeffersonville, Burlington, St. Johnsbury	Eastern end of concurrency with US 7
Town of St. Albans	14.745	23.730	VT 104 to I-89 / VT 105 – Fairfax	
Bakersfield	29.431	47.365	VT 108 – Enosburg Falls, Jeffersonville	Eastern terminus
1.000 mi = 1.609 km; 1.000 km = 0.621 mi: Concurrency terminus
