= Peter Bent Brigham =

American businessman and philanthropist

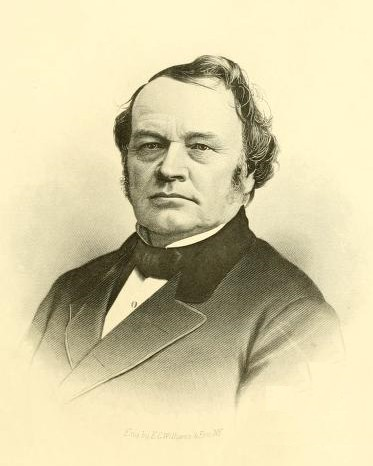
- Peter Bent Brigham ca1875
- Born: February 4, 1807; Bakersfield, Vermont
- Died: May 24, 1877 (aged 70); Boston, Massachusetts, United States
- Known for: initial endowment of Peter Bent Brigham Hospital
- Spouse: never married
- Parent(s): Uriah Brigham (1757-1820); Elizabeth (Fay) Brigham (1767-1837)

Peter Bent Brigham (1807–1877) was an American millionaire businessman, restaurateur, real estate trader, and director of the Fitchburg Railroad. He is best known as a philanthropist for his initial endowment of Peter Bent Brigham Hospital and the Brigham Academy in Bakersfield, Vermont.

== Early life and family ==
Peter Bent Brigham was born on 4 February 1807 in Bakersfield, Vermont as the seventh of nine children born to Uriah Brigham (1757–1820) and Elizabeth (Fay) Brigham (1767–1837). Brigham was a direct descendant of Thomas Brigham (1603–1653), an early immigrant to Cambridge, Massachusetts, as well as John Bent (1596-1672) a founder of Sudbury, Massachusetts. Brigham had little formal schooling and went to find work in Boston in his early teens, when his father died. He worked on Middlesex Canal boats on his way, and then began his career selling fish and oysters in Boston. He never married.

== Career in Boston ==
Brigham owned a restaurant on the corner of Hanover and Court Streets in Boston, Massachusetts, which he operated until it was sold in 1869 due to a street widening project. He was an astute and financially successful real estate investor. He chose not to run for any public office in Boston. Brigham was one of the founding directors of the Fitchburg Railroad and continued his work with the railroad until his death.

Peter Bent Brigham died at his home at the northeast corner of Bulfinch and Allston Streets on Beacon Hill in Boston on 24 May 1877. He is buried at Mount Auburn Cemetery in Cambridge, Massachusetts.

== Legacy and endowments ==
Brigham never married and had no children. He regretted his lack of formal education, which motivated his bequests to improve the educational opportunities in his hometown of Bakersfield, resulting in the founding of Brigham Academy. The terms of his will also specified that $1,300,000 was to be spent 25 years after his death, for a hospital "for the care of sick persons in indigent circumstances". The money appreciated to $2,000,000 by 1902. It was used to establish the Peter Bent Brigham Hospital, which opened in 1913, and became a world-renowned medical research hospital affiliated with Harvard Medical School.

Brigham's nephew, Robert Breck Brigham (1826-1900), was also a restaurateur and successful businessman. He followed his uncle's example by endowing the Robert Breck Brigham Hospital to serve patients with arthritis and other debilitating joint diseases, which opened in 1914.

The two Brigham hospitals merged with Boston Hospital for Women in 1981, and are now known as the Brigham and Women's Hospital.
