= Westford, Vermont =

- Town
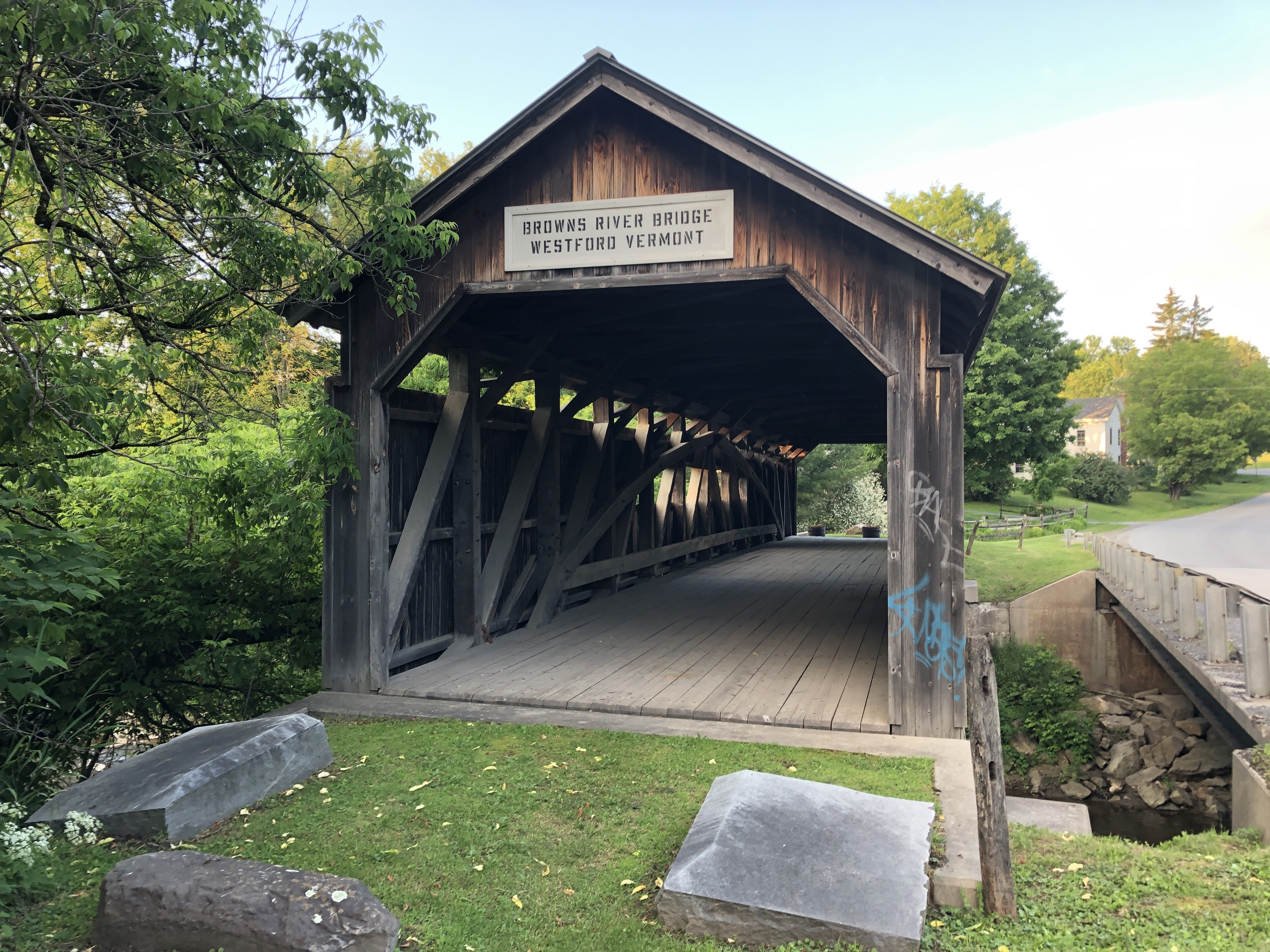
- Westford Covered Bridge in 2019

- Logo

- Location in Chittenden County and the state of Vermont
- Coordinates: 44°36′50″N 72°59′52″W
- Country: United States
- State: Vermont
- County: Chittenden
- Settled: 1763
- Chartered: June 8, 1763
- Named for: Being the westernmost of four simultaneously granted New Hampshire Grants
- Communities: Westford; Bowman Corners; Cloverdale

Area
  - Total: 39.3 sq mi (101.8 km^{2})
  - Land: 39.1 sq mi (101.2 km^{2})
  - Water: 0.19 sq mi (0.5 km^{2})
- Elevation: 466 ft (142 m)

Population (2020)
  - Total: 2,062
  - Density: 53/sq mi (20.4/km^{2})
- Time zone: UTC-5 (Eastern (EST))
  - Summer (DST): UTC-4 (EDT)
- ZIP codes: 05494 (Westford); 05452 (Essex); 05489 (Underhill)
- Area code: 802
- FIPS code: 50-80350
- GNIS feature ID: 1462251
- Website: westfordvt.us

Westford is a town in Chittenden County, Vermont, United States. The population was 2,062 at the 2020 census.

== History ==
The area that is today described as Westford, Vermont originally fell within the traditional territories of the Sokoki, Missisquoi, and Cowasuck bands of the Western Abenaki tribes. Newly introduced infectious diseases and attacks by English settlers greatly impacted native populations and prompted their emigration to Quebec by the 1670s, opening the land for settlement by European immigrants. The original charter for the Town of Westford was granted at a cost of £20 (equivalent to £3,707 or US$4,738 in 2024) by New Hampshire's provisional governor Benning Wentworth on June 8, 1763, as part of a series of what came to be known as New Hampshire Grants. (Note: Other New Hampshire Grants dated June 8, 1763, include Berlin, Mansfield, Midlesex [sic], Milton, Stow [sic], Underhill, and Worster [sic]. The set of grants including Westford, Underhill, Jericho, and Huntington would come to be known as the Onion River Company Grants.) According to Wentworth's grant, six lots were set aside (3 for religious use, 1 for the town's school, and 2 for Wentworth himself) and the remainder of the land was subdivided among the founding residents. Although officially granted simultaneously with Underhill and Mansfield, the description of Westford's territory is recognized as having been set down earlier due to the fact that their territorial boundaries are defined in relation to Westford's. From their founding, both Westford and Underhill shared many of the same grantees, and settlement between the two towns occurred in concert with families such as the Macombers living in Westford but conducting business on Underhill's Mount Macomber.

Governor Wentworth's land grants in the area that is today Vermont were considered controversial at the time and since the early 1750s New York, which also laid claim to the area, had challenged the validity of town charters granted by Wentworth. Between 1764 and 1770, in a series of legal decisions handed down by England's Board of Trade and the New York Supreme Court of Judicature, New York was found to be the proper jurisdictional body for the area and Wentworth's charters were invalidated. New York immediately began redistricting the area by land patent, putting Westford within the now-extinct Charlotte County (formed 1772), and requiring residents to repurchase their land from New York in order to retain legal title. The residents of Westford (together with residents of the other New Hampshire Grant towns) protested this ruling and petitioned New York for the confirmation of Wentworth's town grants. In response New York declared that it would halt further subdivision of settled areas until clarification of King George III's intent was made clear. Before such clarification could be made, the American Revolutionary War (1775) interrupted matters and shortly afterward in 1777, Vermont seceded from New York and England to form the Republic of Vermont. New York's redistricting was forgotten and Westford solidified its position as a town within Vermont's western County of Bennington (founded in 1779, and later splitting the area containing Westford into Rutland in 1781, Addison in 1785, and ultimately Chittenden County in 1787). Westford would remain part of Chittenden County during the state's 1791 entrance to the United States as its 14th state and through to the present.

Historical administrative designations

Year	Country/Land	State/Province	County	Town
Pre-1763	Western Abenaki lands	–	–	–
1763	UK	New Hampshire‡	–	Westford
1770	UK	New York	–	Westford‡
1772	UK	New York	Charlotte	Westford‡
1775	USA	New York	Charlotte	Westford‡
1777	Vermont	–	–	Westford
1779	Vermont	–	Bennington	Westford
1781	Vermont	–	Rutland	Westford
1785	Vermont	–	Addison	Westford
1787	Vermont	–	Chittenden	Westford
1791	USA	Vermont	Chittenden	Westford

‡ Legally dubious designation

== Geography ==
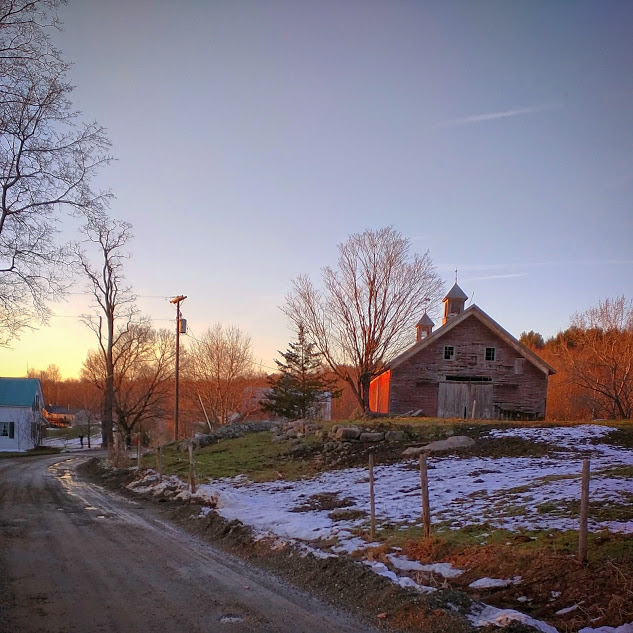
Dirt road in rural Westford

Westford is in northern Chittenden County, bordered by Franklin and Lamoille counties to the north. According to the United States Census Bureau, the town has a total area of 39.3 square miles (101.8 km^{2}), of which 39.1 square miles (101.2 km^{2}) is land and 0.19 square miles (0.5 km^{2}), or 0.53%, is water. Prominent waterways include Westford Pond, Pond Brook, Rogers Brook, and the Browns River (on the east), as well as Morgan Brook (in the town's center) and Beaver Brook (in the northeast near Cloverdale). The town has a number of named hills including those named after prominent families (e.g. Duffy and Stewart), and others named descriptively (e.g. Oak, (Note: There were two Bald Hills in Westford for many years until the one located in the northeast corner of town was renamed Oak Hill.) Beech, Spruce, Bald, and Prospect). In her bicentennial work, Vermont Place-Names, historian Esther Munroe Swift suggests that some of the more abstract names of Westford's hills may closely reflect the sentiments of the original English settlers. Swift notes that the process of subdividing down to individual lots was often done in stages with the first few lots representing land suitable for dwellings and tillage, the second group of lots representing pasture land, and the third group representing land suitable only for logging. Swift points to hills like Westford's Number Eleven Hill (never renamed from its original lot number) and Jack Lot Hill as examples of hills whose names reflect the dissatisfaction of their owners with the quality of land.

The town of Westford contains two villages: Brookside (centered in the bend of Rogers Brook along Maple Tree Lane and Brookside Road), and Westford (commonly known as Westford Center and centered on the Westford Commons). Smaller communities include the hamlet of Cloverdale (located near Vermont Route 15 in Westford's northeast corner), Osgood Hill where early settler Manassah Osgood first settled, Bowman's Corners just south of Brookside, and the historic communities along the northern border with Fairfax, which developed in response to the early industry along the Lamoille River from Fairfax Falls to what is now Fairfax village where the Mill Brook forge was located.

== Demographics ==
Historical population
Census	Pop.	Note	%±
1790	63		—
1800	648		928.6%
1810	1,107		70.8%
1820	1,025		−7.4%
1830	1,290		25.9%
1840	1,352		4.8%
1850	1,458		7.8%
1860	1,231		−15.6%
1870	1,237		0.5%
1880	1,133		−8.4%
1890	1,033		−8.8%
1900	888		−14.0%
1910	854		−3.8%
1920	706		−17.3%
1930	698		−1.1%
1940	698		0.0%
1950	685		−1.9%
1960	680		−0.7%
1970	991		45.7%
1980	1,413		42.6%
1990	1,740		23.1%
2000	2,086		19.9%
2010	2,029		−2.7%
2020	2,062		1.6%
U.S. Decennial Census

As of the census of 2010, there were 2029 people, 757 households, and 574 families residing in the town. The population density was 51.6 people per square mile (20.0/km^{2}). There were 787 housing units at an average density of 20.0 per square mile (7.7/km^{2}). The racial makeup of the town was 97.2% White, 0.3% African American, 0.4% Native American, 0.3% Asian, 0.2% from other races, and 1.5% from two or more races. Hispanic or Latino of any race were 0.8% of the population.

There were 757 households, out of which 37.3% had children under the age of 18 living with them, 8.1% had a female householder with no husband present, and 24.2% were non-families. The average household size was 2.68 and the average family size was 3.00.

In the town, the population was spread out, with 26.6% under the age of 20, 3.9% from 20 to 24, 26.6% from 25 to 44, 33.9% from 45 to 64, and 8.8% who were 65 years of age or older. The median age was 41.5 years. For every 100 females, there were 101.2 males. For every 100 females age 18 and over, there were 98 males.

== Economy ==
=== Personal income ===
The median income for a household in the town was $81,574, and the median income for a family was $84,423. Males had a median income of $55,417 versus $50,179 for females. The per capita income for the town was $34,502. About 1.0% of families and 1.7% of the population were below the poverty line, including 2.4% of those under age 18 and 3.7% of those age 65 or over.

=== Industry ===
The town's first industrial center was located in the Village of Brookside, an area bounded on three sides by the Rogers Brook. Historic maps of the area show that at the turn of the 20th century (between 1893 and 1910), Brookside featured a post office, (Note: The Brookside post office was independent from the Westford post office established in the Village of Westford in 1816.) cheese plant, and cheese box factory all run by the Rogers family. Other businesses flourished along the northern town line with Fairfax, where the Mill Brook forge worked iron ore mined in Colchester from 1796 until its closure in 1810, and in the Hamlet of Cloverdale which developed surrounding the Cloverdale Creamery and freight station on the Burlington and Lamoille Railroad running between Burlington and Cambridge.

Westford businesses include Rovers North, a Land Rover parts dealer employing more than 20 people, Morgan Brook Farm/Wagyu Wagon, and Kickback Brewery. Professional services, agribusinesses, transportation, and construction companies account for the largest number of commercial businesses.

== Notable people ==
- Steven T. Byington (1869–1957), intellectual and American individualist anarchist born in Westford
- Philo Judson Farnsworth (1832–1909), physician born in Westford
- Seneca Haselton (1848–1921), mayor of Burlington, Vermont, Associate Justice of the Vermont Supreme Court
- Paul Languedoc (born 1958), soundman for Vermont jam-band Phish.
- Jonathan Mann (born 1982), musician who grew up in Westford
- Dewey H. Perry (1898–1970), U.S. Marshal for Vermont
- Luke P. Poland (1815–1887), United States senator and representative from Vermont born in Westford
- Torrey E. Wales (1820–1902), lawyer and second Mayor of Burlington, Vermont born in Westford
- William Cleaver Wilkinson (1833–1920), professor of theology and poetry born in Westford

== See also ==
- Westmore, Vermont – Originally chartered as Westford by the Republic of Vermont in 1781.
- The Finger (Westford, Vermont) – an outdoor sculpture in Westford
