= The Finger (sculpture) =

2018 wooden sculpture

- Artist: Charlie O'Brien
- Year: 2018
- Medium: Pine wood
- Weight: 700 lb (320 kg)
- Location: Westford, Vermont, U.S.; 44°38′31.3″N 73°00′55.1″W
- Owner: Ted Pelkey

The Finger is a sculpture in Westford, Vermont, U.S. Depicting a hand giving the middle finger, it was erected by Ted Pelkey on November 30, 2018, to protest the Westford Development Review Board rejecting Pelkey's request to build a garage on his property.

== Description ==
The Finger is a 7-foot (2.1 m) tall sculpture depicting a hand giving the finger on a 16 ft (4.9 m) tall pole. It was carved from a 700-pound (320 kg) block of pine wood by Charlie O'Brien using a chainsaw at his shop, Where the Bears Are, near Stowe, Vermont. It is located on Pelkey's property on Vermont Route 128.

== History ==
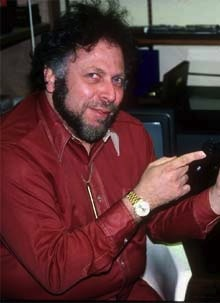
The Finger was compared to a middle finger sculpture from Spin City displayed at the house of Al Goldstein.

When The Finger was erected, Pelkey ran Ted's Truck and Trailer Repair with his son and cleaned spools of monofilament fishing line in Swanton, Vermont. According to Pelkey, he had tried to build a 8,000-square-foot (740 m^{2}) garage on his 11-acre (4.5 ha) property to move the business – which would eliminate his daily commute and save rent money – for ten years. While Pelkey said the Westford Development Review Board initially accepted his request for a building permit for the garage, they reversed amid complaints to the Vermont Environmental Court from Pelkey's neighbors; official reasons included failing to describe the building's use and that his request did not include information on lighting for the garage. Pelkey accused the Development Review Board of bias against him, and estimated the fighting for the permit had cost US$100,000 by The Finger's erection. Brian Monaghan, Pelkey's attorney, appealed the decision roughly two months before The Finger was erected; a decision was set for early 2019.

In 2018, while brainstorming ways to protest the Development Review Board, Pelkey remarked "Too bad I can't go buy a big fucking middle finger and put it on a post out there." While his wife told him to "cut it out", Pelkey consulted O'Brien, who had made wood carvings of woodland animals at Where the Bears Are since the 1980s. According to The Burlington Free Press, when O'Brien asked Pelkey what size he wanted the sculpture, he replied "how big can you make it?" The statue cost three or four thousand dollars. (Note: While The Boston Globe reports $3,000, The Burlington Free Press and WPTZ report $4,000.)

The Finger was erected on November 30, 2018. Pelkey said he installed the sculpture to encourage Westford residents to "have a really long look at the people who are running their town". While Pelkey expected a request to remove it, the Westford planning coordinator found that he was free to install the sculpture, saying that it was a piece of "public artwork", not a billboard, which are banned in Vermont. Pelkey initially said he would retire The Finger to the garage or his living room and replace it with a peace sign if he received his permit, but later said the sculpture was "awesome" and "a statement made to our rights as Americans" and he would not remove it.

While WCAX described the public reaction to The Finger as "mixed", The Boston Globe reported Westfield residents being mostly amused by the sculpture and several proposing capitalizing on its popularity. The Caledonian-Record wrote an editorial saying that the paper did not "know enough about the board to say if the gesture is warranted", but credited it for respecting Pelkey's First Amendment to the United States Constitution rights. The Miami Herald compared The Finger to an 11-foot (3.4 m) tall styrofoam sculpture of a middle finger from the TV series Spin City installed by pornographer Al Goldstein at his house in Pompano Beach, Florida.

== See also ==
- L.O.V.E. – a 2010 sculpture by Maurizio Cattelan depicting a middle finger
