= Philo Judson Farnsworth =

American physician

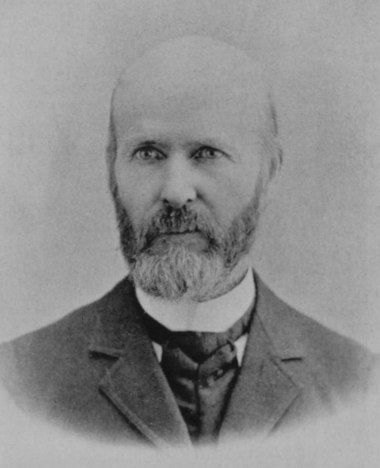
- Born: January 9, 1830; Westford, Vermont
- Died: February 14, 1909 (aged 79); Clinton, Iowa
- Education: University of Vermont; New York College of Physicians and Surgeons
- Occupation: Physician
- Spouse: Elizabeth B. Deane Eaton (m. 1872)
- Children: 1

Philo Judson Farnsworth (January 9, 1830 – February 14, 1909) was an American physician who worked in Iowa.

== Biography ==
Philo Judson Farnsworth was born in Westford, Vermont on Jarnuary 9, 1830. He graduated from the University of Vermont in 1854, and at its medical department in 1858. He practised at Philipsburg, Canada, until 1860, in which year he received a second medical degree from the New York College of Physicians and Surgeons. He was in Lyons, Iowa, in 1862-66, then went to Clinton, Iowa, and in 1870 was elected to the chair of materia medica and diseases of children in the University of Iowa.

He married Elizabeth B. Deane Eaton in 1872, and they had one daughter.

He was a member of several medical societies, and has contributed frequently to professional journals, chiefly to the Medical and Surgical Reporter of Philadelphia. He has also paid some attention to local geology and archaeology. He read a paper on the "Therapeutics of Ammonia" before the American Medical Association in 1873, and one on "Indian Mounds" before the Iowa National History Society in 1876. He is the author of A Synopsis of a Course of Lectures on Materia Medica (Chicago, 1884).

He died in Clinton, Iowa on February 14, 1909.
