= Charles Shattuck Hill =

American civil engineer, writer and editor

Charles Shattuck Hill, C.E. (1868 – January 7, 1948) was an American civil engineer, writer and editor, born at Fairfield, Vermont. He received his degree in civil engineering in 1888. He served on the editorial staff of the Engineering News until 1906; then he became editor of Engineering and Contracting.

Hill died in Long Branch, New Jersey, on January 7, 1948, at the age of 79.

== Works ==
- The Chicago Main Drainage Canal (1896)
- Reinforced Concrete (1904)
- Concrete Construction (1908)
- Concrete Inspection (1909)
