= William Cleaver Wilkinson =

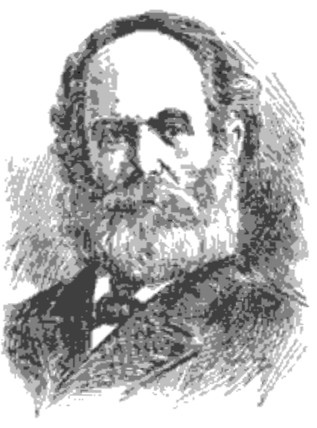
- Born: October 19, 1833; Westford, Vermont
- Died: April 25, 1920 (aged 86); Chicago, Illinois
- Education: University of Rochester; Rochester Theological Seminary
- Occupations: Clergyman, educator

William Cleaver Wilkinson, D.D. (October 19, 1833, in Westford, Vermont – April 25, 1920, in Chicago) was a Baptist preacher, professor of theology, professor of poetry, and literary figure. He popularized the "Three W's and the Five W's".

He graduated from the University of Rochester in 1857 and the Rochester Theological Seminary in 1859. After his graduation, he visited Great Britain and on his return in November 1859, he became pastor of the Wooster Place Baptist church in New Haven, Connecticut. On account of ill health, he resigned his pastorate in 1861 and took a walking tour of England. On his return in 1863, he became professor ad interim of modern languages in the University of Rochester. Not long after he accepted the pastorate of the Mount Auburn Baptist church in Cincinnati, Ohio. Resigning this pastorate in 1866, he opened a private school at Tarrytown, New York. In 1872, he was elected professor of homiletics and pastoral theology at Rochester Theological Seminary, a position which he filled with marked ability until 1882 when he resigned. After that, he devoted himself entirely to literary work. In 1871, he was offered the chair of the German language and literature at the University of Michigan and that of English literature in 1873. In the same year, the University of Rochester conferred upon him the honorary degree of doctor of divinity.

His "Dedication Hymn" (published in his Poems) was used at the dedication of Rockefeller Hall at the Rochester Theological Seminary and of the Toronto Baptist College.

In 1892, he became a professor of poetry and criticism at the University of Chicago. In 1893, Wilkinson spoke on limited tolerance of inter-religious relations but the denial of truth outside of Christianity at the World's Parliament of Religions in Chicago delivering the lecture, The Attitude of Christianity toward other Religions.

In 1905, his daughter Evelyn, aged 20, married a 55-year-old man who had divorced his wife; Wilkinson and his wife "denounced their daughter for marrying a man who cast off one wife to wed another".

He died on April 25, 1920, as a result of injuries from a fall.

== Publications ==
- 1868 The Dance of Modern Society full text
- 1874 A Free Lance in the Field of Life and Letters
- 1882 Preparatory Greek Course in English (the "in English" books are literature in translation)
- 1883 Preparatory Latin Course in English
- 1884 College Greek Course in English
- 1885 College Latin Course in English
- 1886 Classic French Course in English full text
- 1883 Poems
- 1884 Edwin Arnold as Poetizer and as Paganizer, including An Examination Of The "Light Of Asia" For Its Literature And For Its Buddhism
- 1887 Classic German course in English
- 1888 The Baptist denomination
- 1891 The epic of Saul
- 1897 The Baptist principle in application to baptism and the Lord's Supper
- 1897 The epic of Paul
- 1905 Modern masters of pulpit discourse
- 1905 Poems
- 1905 The epic of Moses : a p
