= Vermont Route 38 =

State highway in Franklin County, Vermont, US

Vermont Route 38
- Lower Newton Street
- VT 38 highlighted in red

Route information
- Maintained by VTrans
- Length: 3.864 mi (6.219 km)
- Existed: 1990–present

Major junctions
- South end: US 7 in St. Albans city
- North end: Northwest State Correctional Facility in St. Albans town

Location
- Country: United States
- State: Vermont
- Counties: Franklin

Highway system
- State highways in Vermont
← VT 36	→ VT 44

Vermont Route 38 (VT 38) is a 3.864-mile (6.219 km) long state highway located in Franklin County, Vermont, United States. The route, known locally as Lower Newton Street, begins at a junction with U.S. Route 7 in the city of St. Albans. The route runs northwest into the town of St. Albans before ending at the entrance to the Northwest State Correctional Facility, where VT 38 transitions into Town Highway 6 heading westward. One of the newest state highways in Vermont, VT 38 was designated in 1990.

== Route description ==
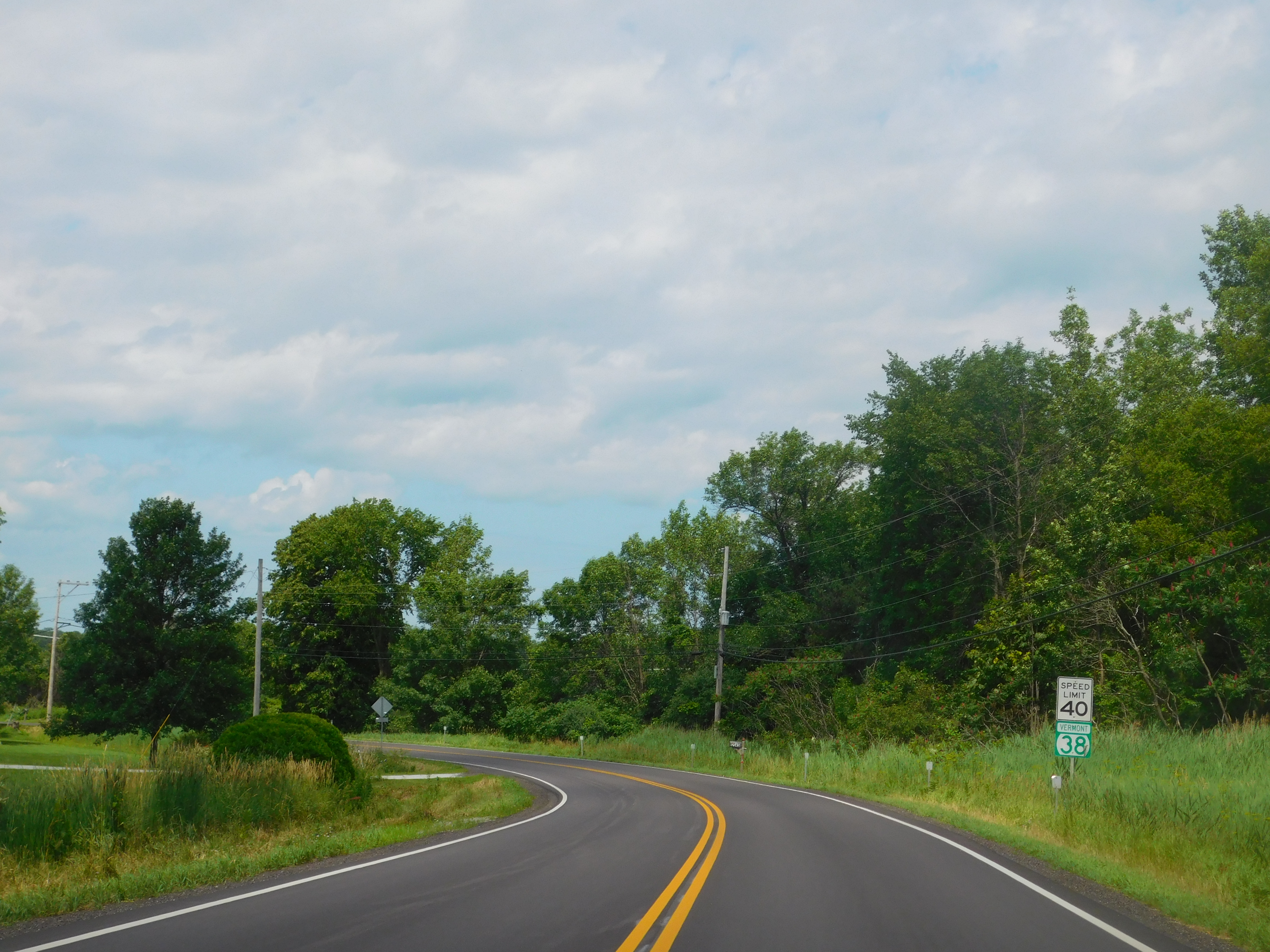
VT 38 in St. Albans town

VT 38 begins at a field just west of the Northwest State Correctional Facility in the Franklin County town of St. Albans as a continuation of Lower Newton Road (Town Highway 6). Going west, TH 6 runs west to VT 36 while VT 38 runs east along Lower Newton along the northern edges of the prison, passing County Road and the entrance to the prison. Now running along the fields in St. Albans, passing a junction with Kellogg Road and turns southeast. VT 38 crosses over the former alignment of the Amtrak Montrealer, passing a local development in St. Albans, soon becoming a residential road as it enters the city of St. Albans. Now a main two-lane road, VT 38 past multiple residences, beginning a bend eastward at North Elm Street. After several blocks as a main west–east road, the route reaches a junction with U.S. Route 7 (North Main Street). This junction marks the eastern terminus of VT 38, which continues east on Upper Newton Street for two blocks through St. Albans.

== History ==
VT 38 was designated by the state of Vermont from the city of St. Albans to the Northwest State Correctional Facility in 1990.

== Major intersections ==
The entire route is in Franklin County.

Location	mi	km	Destinations	Notes
City of St. Albans	0.000	0.000	US 7 (North Main Street)	Southern terminus
Town of St. Albans	3.864	6.219	Entrance to Northwest State Correctional Facility	Northern terminus
1.000 mi = 1.609 km; 1.000 km = 0.621 mi
