= Westford (CDP), Vermont =

Census-designated place in Vermont, United States

Westford, Vermont
- Census-designated place
- Location within Vermont Location within the United States
- Coordinates: 44°36′31″N 73°00′18″W
- Country: United States
- State: Vermont
- County: Chittenden
- Town: Westford

Area
  - Total: 1.19 sq mi (3.09 km^{2})
  - Land: 1.16 sq mi (3.01 km^{2})
  - Water: 0.031 sq mi (0.08 km^{2})
- Elevation: 449 ft (137 m)
- Time zone: UTC-5 (Eastern (EST))
  - Summer (DST): UTC-4 (EDT)
- ZIP Code: 05494
- Area code: 802
- FIPS code: 50-80275
- GNIS feature ID: 2807143

Westford is the primary village and a census-designated place (CDP) in the town of Westford, Chittenden County, Vermont, United States. It was first listed as a CDP prior to the 2020 census.

== Geography ==
The CDP is in northern Chittenden County, in the center of the town of Westford. The Browns River, a north-flowing tributary of the Lamoille River and part of the Lake Champlain watershed, passes through the CDP just east of the village center. Vermont Route 128 runs through Westford village, leading north 4 miles (6 km) to Fairfax and south 8 miles (13 km) to Essex Center.
