= Bakersfield (CDP), Vermont =

Census-designated place in Vermont, United States

Bakersfield, Vermont
- Census-designated place
- Location within Vermont Location within the United States
- Coordinates: 44°46′55″N 72°48′12″W
- Country: United States
- State: Vermont
- County: Franklin
- Town: Bakersfield

Area
  - Total: 1.04 sq mi (2.69 km^{2})
  - Land: 1.04 sq mi (2.69 km^{2})
  - Water: 0 sq mi (0.0 km^{2})
- Elevation: 719 ft (219 m)

Population (2020)
  - Total: 347
- Time zone: UTC-5 (Eastern (EST))
  - Summer (DST): UTC-4 (EDT)
- ZIP Codes: 05441 (Bakersfield); 05448 East Fairfield
- Area code: 802
- FIPS code: 50-02425
- GNIS feature ID: 2586616

Bakersfield is the primary village and a census-designated place (CDP) in the town of Bakersfield, Franklin County, Vermont, United States. As of the 2020 census it had a population of 347, out of 1,273 in the entire town of Bakersfield.

The CDP is in southeastern Franklin County, in the center of the town of Bakersfield. Vermont Route 108 is the village Main Street; it leads south 10 miles (16 km) to Jeffersonville and north 9 miles (14 km) to Enosburg Falls.

== Education ==
It is in the Franklin Northeast Supervisory Union.
