= Kemp-Shepard House =

Historic house in Vermont, United States

- U.S. National Register of Historic Places
- Location within Vermont Location within the United States
- Location: VT 104A, 1 mile (1.6 km) SE of US 7, Georgia, Vermont
- Coordinates: 44°40′59.9″N 73°5′30″W
- Area: 10.5 acres (4.2 ha)
- Built: 1830
- Built by: Kemp, Levi, N.
- Architectural style: Greek Revival
- NRHP reference No.: 97001442
- Added to NRHP: November 13, 1997

The Kemp-Shepard House is a historic house on Highbridge Road (Vermont Route 104A) in Georgia, Vermont. The main block of the brick house, built about 1830, is an important early work of a regional master builder, and it is attached to an older wood-frame ell. It was built on land that was among the first to be settled in the eastern part of the town. The house was listed on the National Register of Historic Places in 1997.

== Description and history ==
The Kemp-Shepard House stands in a rural area of eastern Georgia, on the north side of Highbridge Road just east of its crossing over an inlet of Arrowhead Mountain Lake. It stands on about 10 acres (4.0 ha) of land, a remnant of a once-larger farm property, much of which was inundated when the lake was formed in 1937. The main block is a 1 1/2-story brick structure, with a front-facing gable roof and stone foundation. To the rear of this is an attached wood-frame gable-roofed wing. The main block is three bays wide, with the main entrance set in a recessed opening in the right bay, flanked by sidelight windows. The door and windows are set in rectangular openings with stone sills and lintels. There are two sash windows on the attic level, with a diamond-shaped brickwork pattern nearer the gable. The cornice edge of the gable consists of corbelled brickwork. The interior retains many original finishes. The rear wing exhibits late 18th century construction techniques in its framing, and its original vertical batten siding has been covered by wooden clapboards.

The Kemp-Shepard property was first settled in the 1780s or early 1790s, at which time the c. 80-acre (32 ha) property had a log cabin built on it; this cabin was demolished in the 1980s. A wood-frame farmhouse, the ell of the present house, was built sometime between 1790 and 1810. About 1830 the main block of the house was built. It is the earliest known work of Levi N. Kemp, a poorly documented mason whose known surviving work is of very high quality. The brickwork appearing on this house was emulated in part by other masons, who built some of the other surviving brick houses in the area. The house remained in the hands of Kemp descendants (later named Shepard) into the late 20th century, and did not receive modern amenities such as plumbing and electricity until the 1980s.

== See also ==
- National Register of Historic Places listings in Franklin County, Vermont
