= Fairfield, Vermont =

- Town
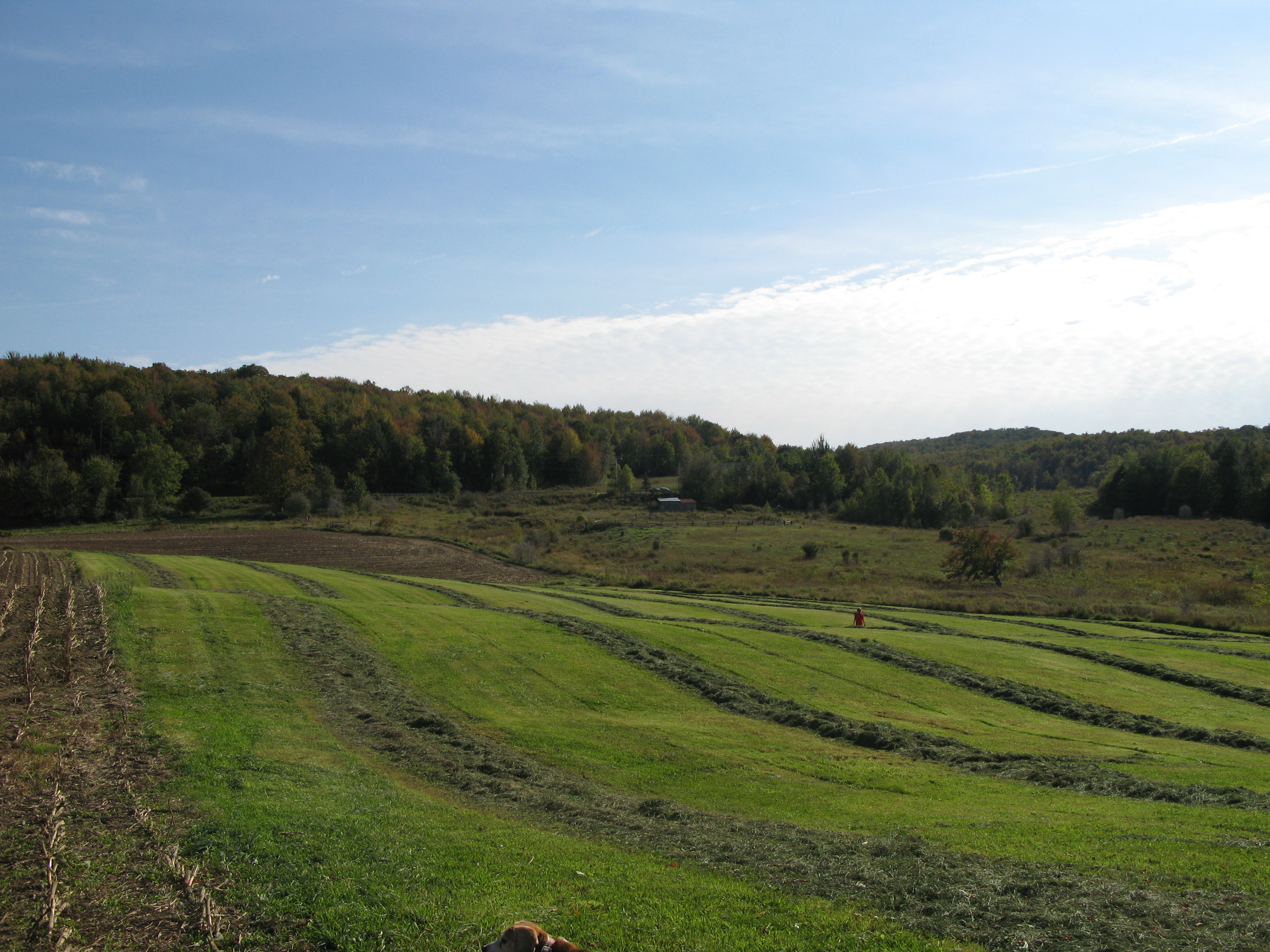
- Countryside in Fairfield

- Seal

- Location in Franklin County and the state of Vermont
- Coordinates: 44°48′30″N 72°55′50″W
- Country: United States
- State: Vermont
- County: Franklin
- Communities: Fairfield; East Fairfield; Fairfield Station; Saint Rocks

Area
  - Total: 68.5 sq mi (177.4 km^{2})
  - Land: 67.4 sq mi (174.6 km^{2})
  - Water: 1.1 sq mi (2.9 km^{2})
- Elevation: 449 ft (137 m)

Population (2020)
  - Total: 2,044
  - Density: 30/sq mi (11.7/km^{2})
- Time zone: UTC-5 (Eastern (EST))
  - Summer (DST): UTC-4 (EDT)
- ZIP Codes: 05455 (Fairfield); 05483 (Sheldon); 05450 (Enosburg Falls); 05448 (East Fairfield); 05454 (Fairfax)
- Area code: 802
- FIPS code: 50-25225
- GNIS feature ID: 1462093
- Website: fairfieldvermont.us

Fairfield is a town in Franklin County, Vermont, United States, chartered in 1763. The population was 2,044 at the 2020 census. President Chester A. Arthur was born in Fairfield in 1829, and lived there for the first three years of his life. A replica of his home, the Chester Alan Arthur State Historic Site, is open seasonally.

== Geography ==
Fairfield occupies central Franklin County, east of St. Albans. Vermont Route 36 crosses the town from east to west.

According to the United States Census Bureau, the town has a total area of 68.5 square miles (177.4 km^{2}), of which 67.4 square miles (174.6 km^{2}) is land and 1.1 square miles (2.9 km^{2}), or 1.61%, is water. The town is drained by Black Creek, a north-flowing tributary of the Missisquoi River. Fairfield Pond is in the town's northwest corner. The town's rolling hills are used for growing hay, corn, and pasture for dairy farms. Many maple trees in the town's forests are tapped for maple syrup production.

== Demographics ==
Historical population
| Census | Pop. | Note | %± |
|---|---|---|---|
| 1790 | 129 | | — |
| 1800 | 901 | | 598.4% |
| 1810 | 1,618 | | 79.6% |
| 1820 | 1,573 | | −2.8% |
| 1830 | 2,270 | | 44.3% |
| 1840 | 2,448 | | 7.8% |
| 1850 | 2,591 | | 5.8% |
| 1860 | 2,497 | | −3.6% |
| 1870 | 2,391 | | −4.2% |
| 1880 | 2,172 | | −9.2% |
| 1890 | 1,825 | | −16.0% |
| 1900 | 1,830 | | 0.3% |
| 1910 | 1,778 | | −2.8% |
| 1920 | 1,532 | | −13.8% |
| 1930 | 1,541 | | 0.6% |
| 1940 | 1,444 | | −6.3% |
| 1950 | 1,428 | | −1.1% |
| 1960 | 1,225 | | −14.2% |
| 1970 | 1,285 | | 4.9% |
| 1980 | 1,493 | | 16.2% |
| 1990 | 1,680 | | 12.5% |
| 2000 | 1,800 | | 7.1% |
| 2010 | 1,891 | | 5.1% |
| 2020 | 2,044 | | 8.1% |
U.S. Decennial Census

=== 2020 census ===
As of the census of 2020, 2,044 people, 781 households, and 585 families resided in Farifield. The population density was 30.3 people per square mile (11.7/km^{2}). There were 779 occupied housing units at an average density of 11.6 per square mile (4.4/km^{2}).

The racial makeup of the town was 92.7% White, 0.68% Native American, 0.15% Asian, and 0.15% African-American, with an additional 5.72% identifying as being of two or more races. Those identifying as Hispanic or Latino of any race were 1.96% of the population.

The population by age broke down as 23.3% under age 18, 9.7% from 18 to 24, 23.3% from 25 to 44, 29.8% from 45 to 64, and 13.9% age 65 or older. The median age was 41.3 years. For every 100 females, there were 109 males; and for every 100 females age 18 and over, there were 116.6 males.

The median income for a household was $93,618, and the median income for a family was $99,471. Approximately 24% of households had income above $150,000, while 26% had income below $50,000. About 3.8% of families and 6.6% of the population were below the poverty line, including 1.7% of those under age 18 and 24.8% of those age 65 or over.

Of the population age 25 or older, 92.4% were high school graduates and 37.7% had a bachelor's degree or higher. Among bachelors degrees held by those over age 25, 55.9% were in science, engineering, and related fields, 18.2% were in education, 10.0% were in business, and 15.9% were in arts, humanities, and other areas.

=== 2000 census ===
The census of 2000 reported that 1,800 people, 620 households, and 486 families resided in the town. The population density was 26.6 people per square mile (10.3/km^{2}). There were 768 housing units at an average density of 11.3 per square mile (4.4/km^{2}). The racial makeup of the town was 97.00% White, 0.89% Native American, 0.11% Asian, 0.17% Pacific Islander, 0.28% from other races, and 1.56% from two or more races. Hispanic or Latino of any race were 1.28% of the population.

There were 620 households, out of which 40.0% had children under the age of 18 living with them, 65.0% were married couples living together, 8.5% had a female householder with no husband present, and 21.6% were non-families. 16.0% of all households were made up of individuals, and 4.2% had someone living alone who was 65 years of age or older. The average household size was 2.90 and the average family size was 3.23.

In the town, the population was spread out, with 30.4% under the age of 18, 6.2% from 18 to 24, 32.2% from 25 to 44, 23.6% from 45 to 64, and 7.6% who were 65 years of age or older. The median age was 35 years. For every 100 females, there were 97.8 males. For every 100 females age 18 and over, there were 99.8 males.

The median income for a household in the town was $44,219, and the median income for a family was $48,542. Males had a median income of $31,756 versus $24,258 for females. The per capita income for the town was $17,307. About 5.9% of families and 9.3% of the population were below the poverty line, including 10.0% of those under age 18 and 7.5% of those age 65 or over.

== Education ==
It is in the Maple Run Unified School District.

== Notable people ==
- Chester A. Arthur, 21st President of the United States
- Consuelo Northrop Bailey, second female lieutenant governor of a U.S. state
- Bradley Barlow, U.S. congressman
- Jeptha Bradley, Vermont Auditor of Accounts
- John Fitzpatrick, mayor of New Orleans
- Charles Shattuck Hill, editor
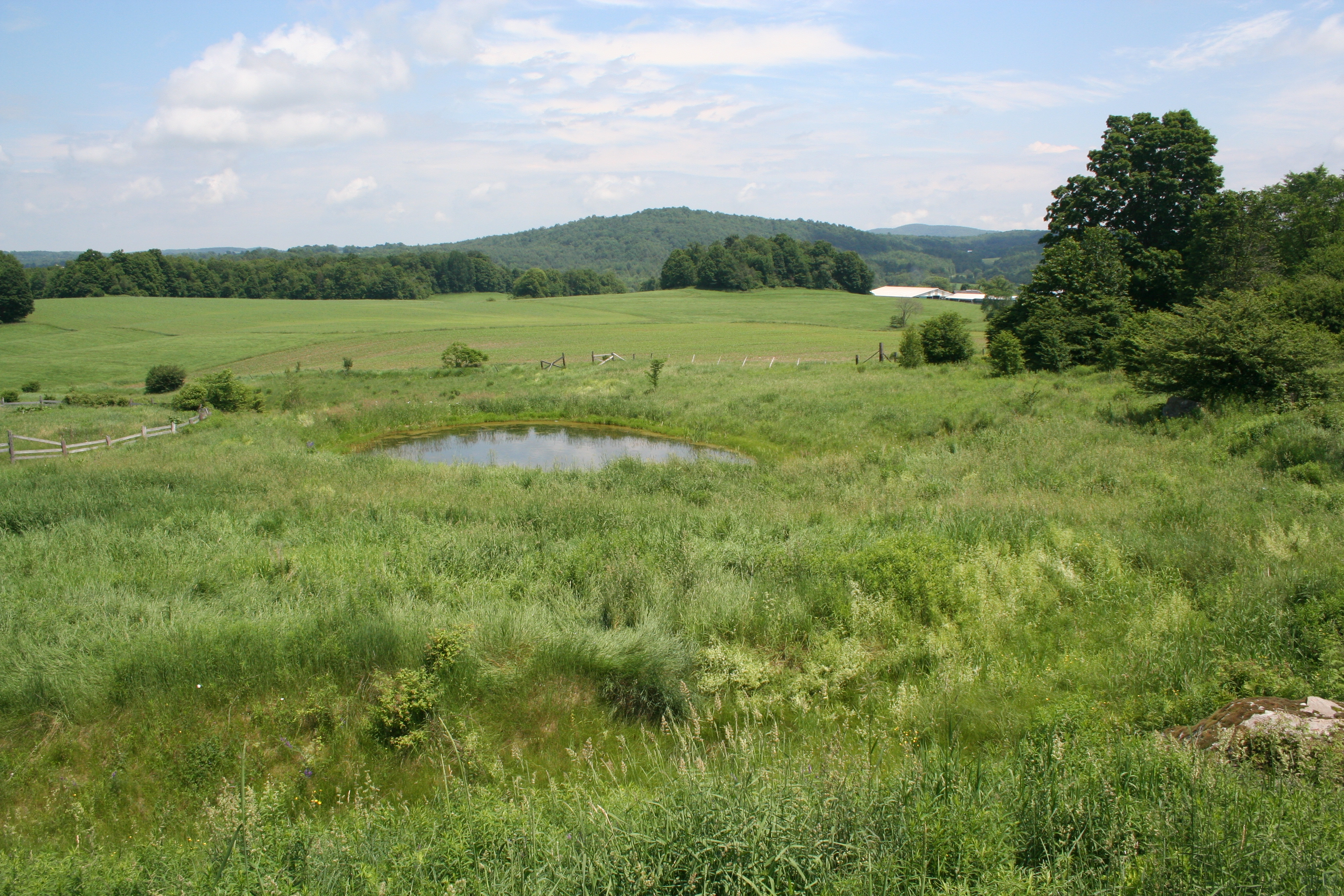
Fields in Fairfield

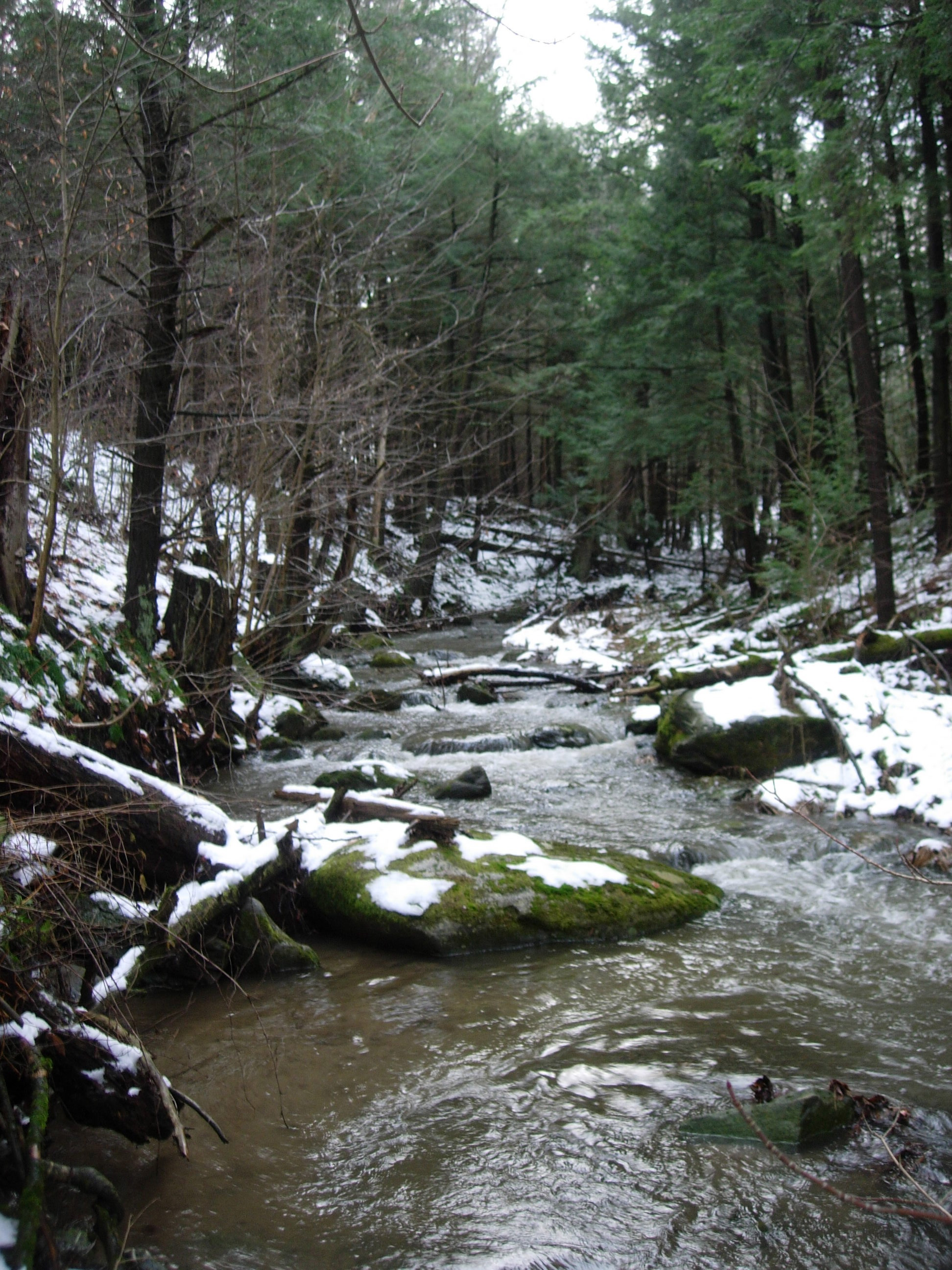
A stream in Fairfield

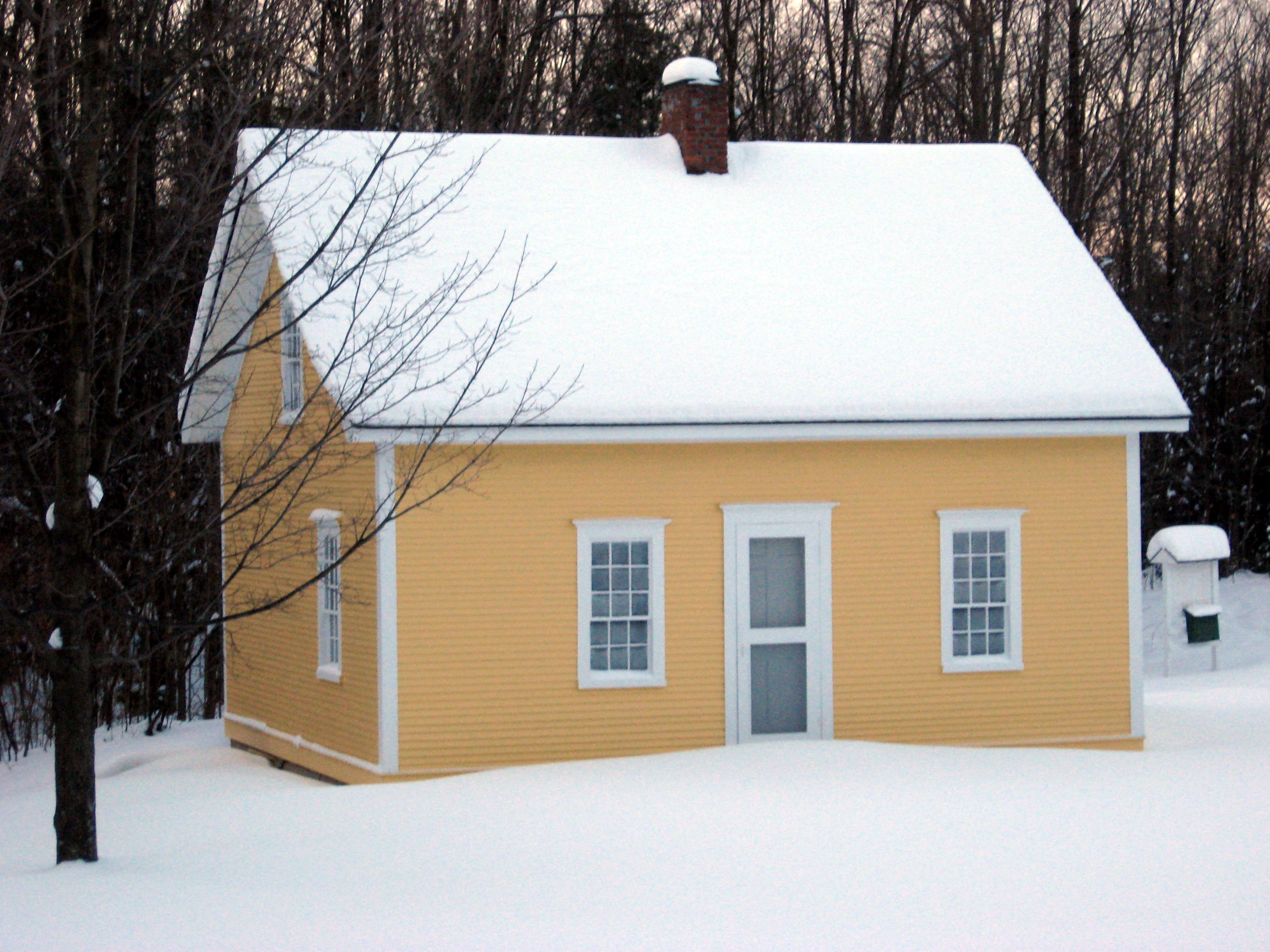
Replica of Chester A. Arthur's birthplace
