= Fairfax, Vermont =

- Town
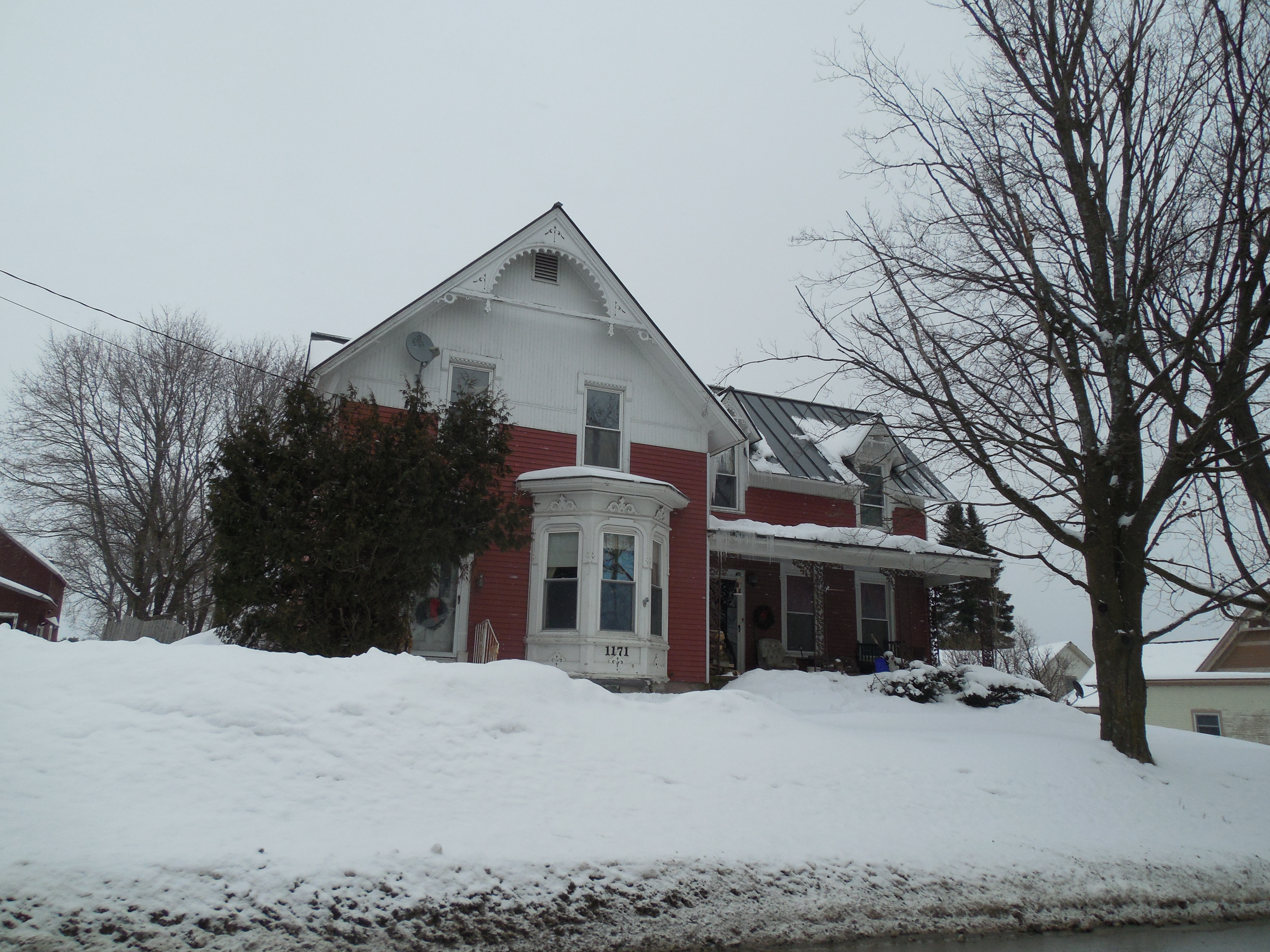
- A house in Fairfax during winter

- Logo
- Motto(s): "Small Town, Big Heart"
- Location in Franklin County and the state of Vermont
- Coordinates: 44°42′35″N 73°00′28″W
- Country: United States
- State: Vermont
- County: Franklin
- Communities: Fairfax; Fairfax Falls; Huntsville; North Fairfax; Sanderson Corner

Area
  - Total: 40.4 sq mi (104.7 km^{2})
  - Land: 39.8 sq mi (103.2 km^{2})
  - Water: 0.58 sq mi (1.5 km^{2})
- Elevation: 715 ft (218 m)

Population (2020)
  - Total: 5,014
  - Density: 126/sq mi (48.6/km^{2})
- Time zone: UTC-5 (Eastern (EST))
  - Summer (DST): UTC-4 (EDT)
- ZIP Codes: 05454 (Fairfax); 05444 (Cambridge)
- Area code: 802
- FIPS code: 50-24925
- GNIS feature ID: 1462092
- Website: www.fairfax-vt.gov

Fairfax is a town in Franklin County, Vermont, United States, with a population of 5,014 at the 2020 census.

== Geography ==
The New England town of Fairfax is in southern Franklin County and is bordered by Chittenden County to the south. According to the United States Census Bureau, the town has a total area of 40.4 square miles (104.7 km^{2}), of which 39.8 square miles (103.2 km^{2}) is land and 0.58 square miles (1.5 km^{2}), or 1.44%, is water. The Lamoille River, a tributary of Lake Champlain, flows from east to west across the southern part of the town, passing through the communities of Fairfax and Fairfax Falls.

== Demographics ==
Historical population
Census	Pop.	Note	%±
1790	254		—
1800	786		209.4%
1810	1,301		65.5%
1820	1,359		4.5%
1830	1,729		27.2%
1840	1,919		11.0%
1850	2,111		10.0%
1860	1,987		−5.9%
1870	1,956		−1.6%
1880	1,820		−7.0%
1890	1,523		−16.3%
1900	1,338		−12.1%
1910	1,318		−1.5%
1920	1,244		−5.6%
1930	1,249		0.4%
1940	1,229		−1.6%
1950	1,129		−8.1%
1960	1,244		10.2%
1970	1,366		9.8%
1980	1,805		32.1%
1990	2,485		37.7%
2000	3,765		51.5%
2010	4,285		13.8%
2020	5,014		17.0%
U.S. Decennial Census

As of the census of 2010, there were 4,285 people, 1,591 households, and 1,226 families residing in the town. The population density was 105.8 people per square mile (40.8/km^{2}). There were 1,683 housing units at an average density of 41.6 per square mile (16.0/km^{2}). The racial makeup of the town was 97.8% White and 1.3% Hispanic or Latino. There were 39.8% of households under the age of 18 living with them, 64.2% were married couples living together, 8.2% had a female householder with no husband present, and 22.9% were non-families and 16.0% of all households were made up of individuals, and 16.2% had someone living alone who was 65 years of age or older. The average household size was 2.69 and the average family size was 3.00.

The median income for a household in the town was $70,348, and the median income for a family was $77,159. The per capita income for the town was $18,632. About 2.7% of families and 4.8% of the population were below the poverty line, including 6.7% of those under age 18 and 4.1% of those age 65 or over.

== Education ==
The town is in the Franklin West Supervisory Union.

Bellows Free Academy – Fairfax is a public K–12 school in Fairfax. The school has an average graduating class of 80 from students drawn from Fairfax and the surrounding towns of Fletcher, Georgia, Fairfield, and Westford. As of 2010, the school's per-pupil tuition is $9,870 paid by the towns (sometimes from outside the school district) who send the students to the school.

Hiram Bellows bought 4 acres (1.6 ha) of land and left money for the construction of a free school in Fairfax, Vermont. 'Bellows Free Academy – Fairfax and Saint Albans' was built from the money earned in stocks willed to the town by Bellows. The stocks had been invested in the Chicago Rock Island Railway. When the stocks had earned $250,000, the school was constructed. The original school burned on January 14, 1941, and the current school is its replacement. The school's team name is The Bullets. It competes as a Division III school. School colors are maroon and white.

== Notable people ==
- Donly C. Hawley, mayor of Burlington, Vermont
- James M. Hotchkiss (1812–1877), member of the Vermont House of Representatives and Vermont Senate
- Israel Bush Richardson (1815–1862), United States Army officer during the Mexican–American War and American Civil War
