= L.O.V.E. (Cattelan) =

2010 sculpture by Maurizio Cattelan

Coordinates: 45°27′53″N 9°11′00″E

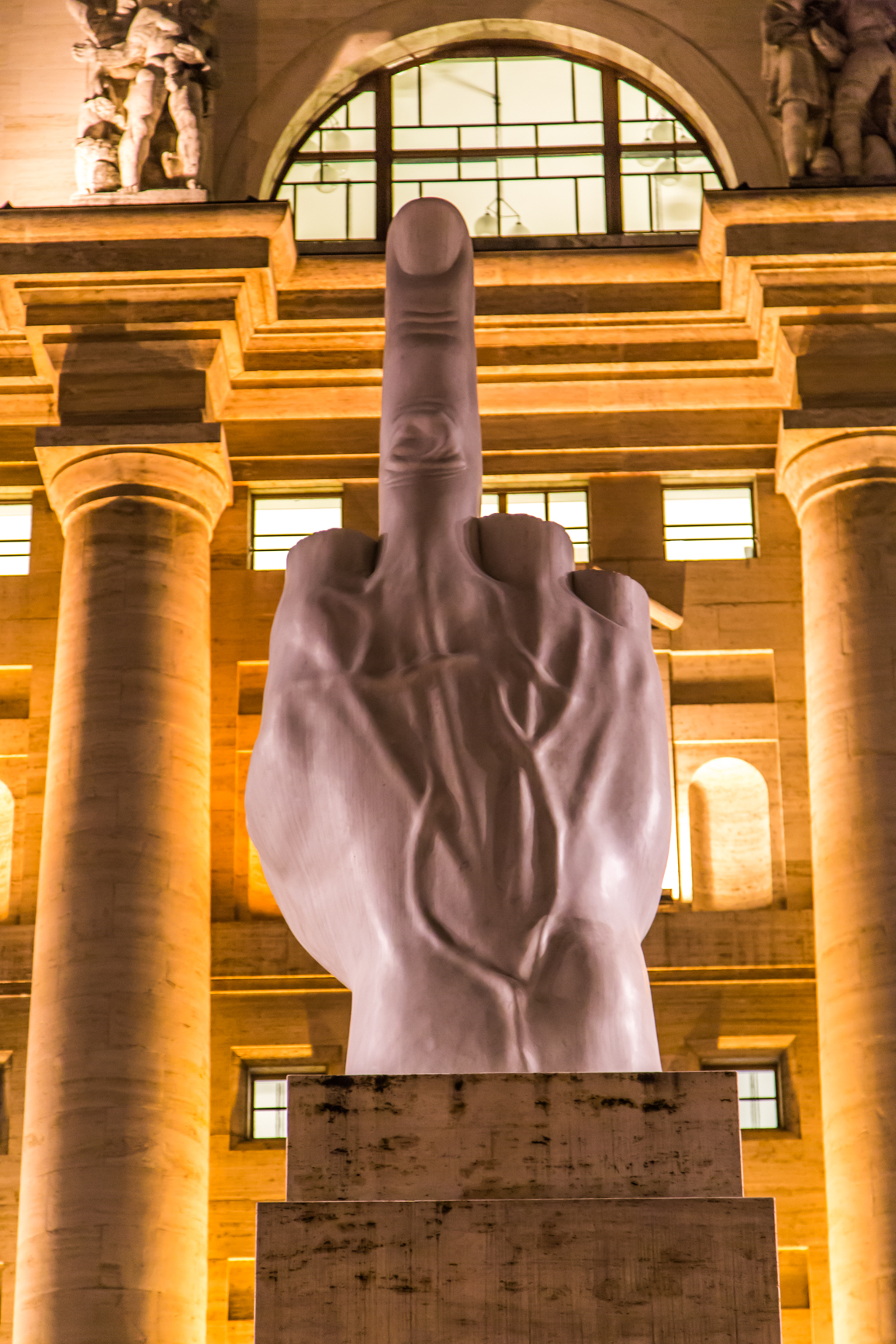
- The sculpture pictured in 2014
- Artist: Maurizio Cattelan
- Year: 2010
- Medium: Carrara marble
- Dimensions: 11 m (36 ft) (Note: Height including pedestal)
- Location: Piazza degli Affari, Milan

L.O.V.E., commonly known as Il Dito (Italian for 'the finger') is a sculpture by Italian artist Maurizio Cattelan consisting of a hand with all the fingers severed with the exception of the middle finger. The sculpture is located in Piazza degli Affari in Milan, where the Italian stock exchange is located. The name L.O.V.E. is the acronym of "Libertà, Odio, Vendetta, Eternità" ("Freedom, Hatred, Revenge, Eternity"). The sculpture, built in 2010, was originally exhibited on the occasion of Cattelan's retrospective at The Royal Palace of Milan. After the exhibition closed, the city Councillor for Culture Massimiliano Finazzer Flory proposed the piece to be permanent. Initially, the business community objected to the idea, but after long deliberations facilitated by Cattelan's decision to donate the sculpture, L.O.V.E. was eventually given permanent status.

Maurizio Cattelan never disclosed the exact meaning of the sculpture. The two most accepted explanations are that it represents both a critique of religious fanaticism and the Fascist salute, and that it is designed as a protest against financial institutions after the 2008 financial crisis.

== History ==
It was inaugurated on 24 September 2010 by the then mayor of Milan, Letizia Moratti. Initially, it was planned that the sculpture, installed as part of a simultaneous Cattelan exhibition at Palazzo Reale, would remain in the square for only a week; nevertheless, from the very first days discussions began about a possible permanent location: Cattelan himself expressed himself with a letter to the then Milanese councillor for Culture, Massimiliano Finazzer Flory, in which he made himself available to donate the work to the city, provided that "the original spirit of the work was respected. The project was created for Piazza Affari and must remain there, this is my condition".

In the following months, despite some protests from the world of Milanese finance, the display of the Finger was extended from time to time until between 2011 and 2012 the government of Giuliano Pisapia, Moratti's successor at Palazzo Marino, decided on its definitive installation in the heart of Italian finance, thanks to the intervention of the new assessor for Culture, Stefano Boeri.

== See also ==
- The Finger (sculpture)
