= Fairfax (CDP), Vermont =

Census-designated place in Vermont, United States

Fairfax, Vermont
- Census-designated place
- Location within Vermont Location within the United States
- Coordinates: 44°40′08″N 73°00′14″W
- Country: United States
- State: Vermont
- County: Franklin
- Town: Fairfax

Area
  - Total: 1.96 sq mi (5.07 km^{2})
  - Land: 1.89 sq mi (4.90 km^{2})
  - Water: 0.066 sq mi (0.17 km^{2})
- Elevation: 453 ft (138 m)

Population (2020)
  - Total: 865
- Time zone: UTC-5 (Eastern (EST))
  - Summer (DST): UTC-4 (EDT)
- ZIP Codes: 05454
- Area code: 802
- FIPS code: 50-24850
- GNIS feature ID: 2586630

Fairfax is the primary village and a census-designated place (CDP) in the town of Fairfax, Franklin County, Vermont, United States. As of the 2020 census it had a population of 865, out of 5,014 in the entire town of Fairfax.

== Geography ==
The CDP is in southern Franklin County, in the southern part of the town of Fairfax. It sits on the north side of the Lamoille River, a west-flowing tributary of Lake Champlain. Vermont Route 104 is the village's Main Street; it leads northwest 12 miles (19 km) to St. Albans and southeast 8 miles (13 km) to Cambridge.

== Education ==
It is in the Franklin West Supervisory Union.
