= Franklin West Supervisory Union =

Coordinates: 43.5799°N 73.0364°W

Franklin West Supervisory Union (FWSU) is located in Georgia, Vermont (Franklin County). Supervisory Unions in Vermont provide administrative governance for local school districts. FWSU oversees Fairfax Town School District, Fletcher Town School District, and Georgia Town School District and also serves Bellows Free Academy in Fairfax, Georgia Elementary Middle School, and Fletcher Elementary School.
