= East Fairfield, Vermont =

- Village
- Location within Vermont
- Coordinates: 44°47′04″N 72°51′30″W
- Country: United States
- State: Vermont
- County: Franklin
- Elevation: 420 ft (130 m)
- Time zone: UTC-5 (Eastern (EST))
  - Summer (DST): UTC-4 (EDT)
- ZIP code: 05448
- Area code: 802
- GNIS feature ID: 1457276

East Fairfield is an unincorporated village in the town of Fairfield, Franklin County, Vermont, United States. The community is located along Vermont Route 36 11.2 miles (18.0 km) east of St. Albans City. East Fairfield has a post office with ZIP code 05448.
