= Newport Airport =

Newport Airport may refer to:

- Newport Municipal Airport (Arkansas) in Newport, Arkansas, United States
- Newport Municipal Airport (Oregon) in Newport, Oregon, United States
- Newport State Airport (Rhode Island) in Middletown (near Newport), Rhode Island, United States
- Newport State Airport (Vermont) in Newport, Vermont, United States
- Parlin Field in Newport, New Hampshire, United States

== See also ==
- Newport Municipal Airport (disambiguation)
- Newport State Airport (disambiguation)
