= List of airports in Vermont =

This is a list of airports in Vermont (a U.S. state), grouped by type and sorted by location. It contains all public-use and military airports in the state. Some private-use and former airports may be included where notable, such as airports that were previously public-use, those with commercial enplanements recorded by the FAA or airports assigned an IATA airport code.

== Airports ==
This list contains the following information:

- **City served** – The city generally associated with the airport, as per the airport's master record with the Federal Aviation Administration. This is not always the actual location since some airports are located in smaller towns outside of the city they serve. It is not meant to be a complete list of cities served, which can be found in or added to each airport's Wikipedia article.
- **FAA** – The location identifier assigned by the Federal Aviation Administration (FAA). These are linked to each airport's page at the Vermont Agency of Transportation.
- **IATA** – The airport code assigned by the International Air Transport Association (IATA). Those that do not match the FAA code are shown in bold.
- **ICAO** – The location indicator assigned by the International Civil Aviation Organization (ICAO).
- **Airport name** – The official airport name. Those shown in **bold** indicate the airport has scheduled passenger service on commercial airlines.
- **Role** – One of four FAA airport categories, as per the 2021–2025 National Plan of Integrated Airport Systems (NPIAS) report released September 2020:
  - P-s: Commercial service – primary are publicly owned airports that receive scheduled passenger service and have more than 10,000 passenger boardings (enplanements) each year. Each primary airport is sub-classified by the FAA as one of the following four "hub" types (s):
    - L: Large hub that accounts for at least 1% of total U.S. passenger enplanements.
    - M: Medium hub that accounts for between 0.25% and 1% of total U.S. passenger enplanements.
    - S: Small hub that accounts for between 0.05% and 0.25% of total U.S. passenger enplanements.
    - N: Nonhub that accounts for less than 0.05% of total U.S. passenger enplanements, but more than 10,000 annual enplanements.
  - CS: Commercial service – nonprimary are publicly owned airports that receive scheduled passenger service and have at least 2,500 passenger boardings each year.
  - R: Reliever airports are designated by the FAA to relieve congestion at a large commercial service airport and to provide more general aviation access to the overall community.
  - GA: General aviation airports are the largest single group of airports in the U.S. airport system. They are public-use airports that do not have scheduled service or have scheduled service with less than 2,500 passenger boardings each year.
- **Enplanements** – The number of enplanements (commercial passenger boardings) that occurred at the airport in calendar year 2019, as per FAA records released October 2020.

| City served | FAA | IATA | ICAO | Airport name | Role | Enplanements (2024) |
|---|---|---|---|---|---|---|
| | | | | **Commercial service – primary airports** | | |
| Burlington | BTV | BTV | KBTV | **Patrick Leahy Burlington International Airport** | P-S | 670,636 |
| | | | | **Commercial service – nonprimary airports** | | |
| Rutland | RUT | RUT | KRUT | **Rutland–Southern Vermont Regional Airport** (was Rutland State) | CS | 4,519 |
| | | | | **General aviation airports** | | |
| Barre / Montpelier | MPV | MPV | KMPV | Edward F. Knapp State Airport | GA | 50 |
| Bennington | DDH | | KDDH | William H. Morse State Airport | GA | 12 |
| Lyndonville | CDA | LLX | KCDA | Caledonia County Airport (was Caledonia County State) | GA | 0 |
| Middlebury | 6B0 | | | Middlebury State Airport | GA | 29 |
| Morrisville | MVL | MVL | KMVL | Morrisville–Stowe State Airport | GA | 101 |
| Newport | EFK | EFK | KEFK | Northeast Kingdom International Airport | GA | 27 |
| Post Mills | 2B9 | | | Post Mills Airport | GA | 0 |
| Springfield | VSF | VSF | KVSF | Hartness State (Springfield) Airport | GA | 12 |
| Swanton | FSO | | KFSO | Franklin County State Airport | GA | 6 |
| Warren | 0B7 | | | Warren–Sugarbush Airport | GA | 5 |
| | | | | **Other public-use airports** (not listed in NPIAS) | | |
| Island Pond | 5B1 | | | John H. Boylan State (Island Pond) Airport | | |
| Shelburne | VT8 | | | Shelburne Airport | | |
| Vergennes | B06 | | | Basin Harbor Airport | | |
| West Dover | 4V8 | | | Deerfield Valley Regional Airport (was Mount Snow) | | 0 |
| | | | | **Notable private-use airports** | | |
| Colchester | 48VT | | | Cub Cove Seaplane Base | | |
| | | | | **Notable former airports** | | |
| Burlington | | | | Fort Ethan Allen Army Airfield | | |
| Fair Haven | ~~1B3~~ | | | Fair Haven Municipal Airport (closed 2009?) | ~~GA~~ | |
| North Windham | ~~3N3~~ | | | Robin's Nest Airport (North Windham Airport) (closed 2001?) | | |
| Windsor | | | | Miller Airport (closed 1984–1988) | | |

== See also ==
- Essential Air Service
- Vermont World War II Army Airfields
- Wikipedia:WikiProject Aviation/Airline destination lists: North America#Vermont
