= Rutland–Southern Vermont Regional Airport =

Rutland – Southern Vermont Regional Airport

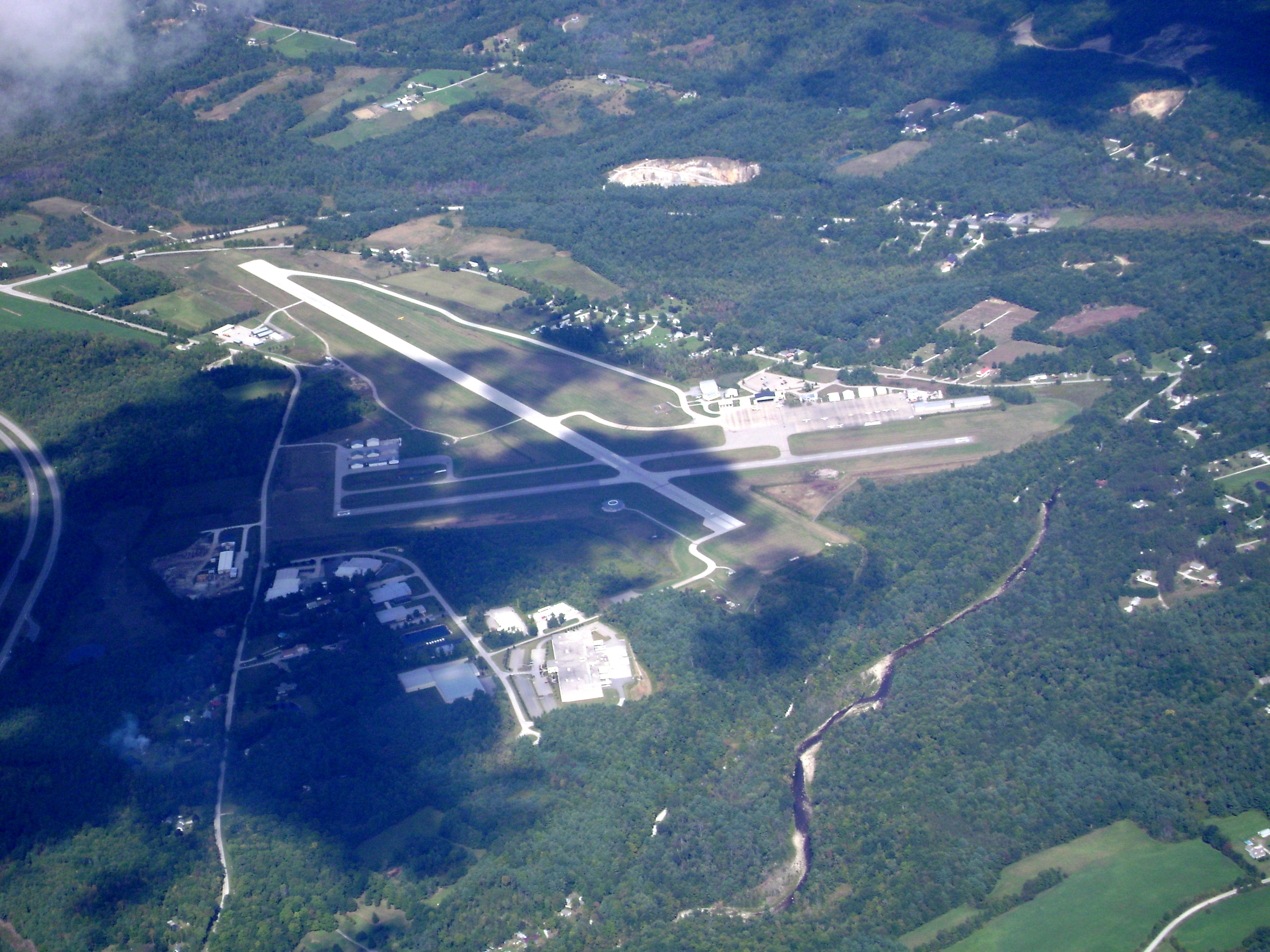
- Aerial photo, September 2007
- IATA: RUT; ICAO: KRUT; FAA LID: RUT

Summary
- Airport type: Public
- Owner: State of Vermont
- Serves: Rutland, Vermont
- Location: North Clarendon
- Elevation AMSL: 787 ft (240 m)
- Coordinates: 43°31′48″N 072°56′59″W
- Website: www.flyrutlandvt.com

Map
- Interactive map of Rutland – Southern Vermont Regional Airport

Runways
| Direction | Length | | Surface |
| Direction | ft | m | Surface |
|---|---|---|---|
| 1/19 | 5,304 | 1,617 | Asphalt |
| 13/31 | 3,169 | 966 | Asphalt |

Statistics (2017)
- Aircraft operations (year ending May 31, 2017: 13,091
- Based aircraft: 23
- Source: Federal Aviation Administration

Rutland–Southern Vermont Regional Airport (IATA: RUT, ICAO: KRUT, FAA LID: RUT), is a state-owned, public use airport located five nautical miles (6 mi, 9 km) south of the central business district of Rutland, a city in Rutland County, Vermont, United States. Situated in North Clarendon, it was formerly known as Rutland State Airport. Scheduled commercial service is subsidized by the Essential Air Service and provided by Cape Air, with three flights daily on eleven-passenger Tecnam P2012 Traveller aircraft to Boston with typical flight times of 40 minutes.

Rutland–Southern Vermont Regional Airport is the closest commercial service airport to the mountain resorts of Killington, Pico, Okemo, Stratton, Bromley, Magic Mountain, and Mount Snow.

== Name change ==
Legislation was introduced into the Vermont Senate in January 2007 to change the official name of the airport to Rutland–Southern Vermont Regional Airport. The state agency of transportation, meanwhile, had plans to change the name to Rutland/Southwest Vermont Regional Airport. This provoked some opposition from the town of Bennington on the grounds that the William H. Morse State Airport (located in the town), is currently known as "Southwest Vermont's Airport". The agency indicated that it intended to go ahead with the name change anyway, claiming that Bennington's opposition came too late in the process. However, the agency changed the name to Rutland Southern Vermont Regional Airport on August 15, 2007.

== Facilities and aircraft ==
Rutland–Southern Vermont Regional Airport covers an area of 345 acres (140 ha) at an elevation of 787 feet (240 m) above mean sea level. It has two asphalt paved runways: 01/19 is 5,304 by 100 feet (1,525 x 30 m) and 13/31 is 3,169 by 75 feet (966 x 23 m). Runway 19 has a 300-foot EMAS arresting system on the end.

For the 12-month period ending May 31, 2017, the airport had 13,091 aircraft operations, an average of 16 per day: 86% general aviation, 14% air taxi, and 0.2% military. At that time there were 23 aircraft based at this airport: 96% single-engine and 4% multi-engine.

== Airline and destination ==
Cape Air connects Rutland Airport to Logan International Airport (Boston).

Destinations map
All destinations from Rutland–Southern Vermont Regional Airport (RUT).

• Red represents year-round destinations.
• Green represents seasonal destinations.

• Orange represents future destinations.

== Statistics ==
Rutland–Southern Vermont is an FAA Part 139 certificated airport. As per Federal Aviation Administration records, the airport had the following passenger boardings ("enplanements") in recent calendar years:

Passenger boardings (enplanements) by year, as per the FAA
| Year | 2009 | 2010 | 2011 | 2012 | 2013 | 2014 | 2015 | 2016 | 2017 | 2018 | 2019 |
|---|---|---|---|---|---|---|---|---|---|---|---|
| Enplanements | 4,458 | 5,530 | 5,997 | 5,916 | 5,321 | 5,407 | 5,379 | 5,146 | 5,024 | 5,554 | 5,488 |
| Change | ▼12.00% | ▲24.05% | ▲8.44% | ▼1.35% | ▼10.06% | ▲1.62% | ▼0.52% | ▼4.33% | ▼2.37% | ▲10.55% | ▼1.19% |
| Airline | Cape Air | Cape Air | Cape Air | Cape Air | Cape Air | Cape Air | Cape Air | Cape Air | Cape Air | Cape Air | Cape Air |
| Destination(s) | Boston | Boston | Boston | Boston | Boston | Boston | Boston | Boston | Boston | Boston | Boston |

The airport is included in the National Plan of Integrated Airport Systems for 2013–2017, which categorized it as a non-primary commercial service airport (between 2,500 and 10,000 enplanements per year). Total air cargo carried in 2006 was approximately 520,000 pounds with 1,560 cargo operations via FedEx and UPS.

== Accidents and Incidents ==
On August 6, 1986, a Learjet 55 on a corporate flight to Teterboro, NJ crashed on takeoff after the pilot realized his departure was on the wrong runway and aborted the takeoff. There was insufficient length of runway for the abort and the aircraft went off the runway and crashed into a stone wall. The aircraft was destroyed by fire but all 3 occupants on board survived, with the co-pilot sustaining minor injuries.

== See also ==
- List of airports in Vermont

== Other sources ==
- Essential Air Service documents (Docket OST-2005-21681) from the U.S. Department of Transportation:
  - Order 2005-8-23 (August 30, 2005): re-selecting Champlain Enterprises, Inc., d/b/a CommutAir, to provide essential air service at Rutland, Vermont, at an annual subsidy rate of $849,705, for the two-year period November 1, 2005, through October 31, 2007.
  - Order 2007-6-6 (June 6, 2007): prohibiting Champlain Enterprises, Inc., d/b/a CommutAir, operating as Continental Connection, from terminating its subsidized essential air service (EAS) at Plattsburgh and Saranac Lake/Lake Placid, New York, and Rutland, Vermont, at the end of its 90-day notice period, and requesting long-term proposals from carriers interested in providing EAS at all three communities, for a new two-year period, with or without subsidy.
  - Order 2007-9-13 (September 13, 2007): selecting Big Sky Transportation Co., d/b/a Big Sky Airlines, operating as Delta Connection, to provide subsidized EAS at Plattsburgh and Saranac Lake/Lake Placid, New York, utilizing 19-seat Beech 1900-D aircraft, at an annual subsidy rate of $2,408,294, and Hyannis Air Service, Inc., d/b/a Cape Air, to provide subsidized EAS at Rutland, Vermont, with 9-seat Cessna 402s, at annual subsidy rate of $839,746. The carriers will provide EAS at their respective communities for two-year terms beginning when they inaugurate full service.
  - Order 2009-8-11 (August 18, 2009): re-selecting Hyannis Air Service, Inc., d/b/a Cape Air, operating as JetBlue Airways code-share partner, to provide subsidized essential air service (EAS) at Rutland, Vermont, for the four-year period of November 1, 2009, through October 31, 2013, for an annual subsidy rate of $797,151.
