= Newport State Airport =

Newport State Airport may refer to:

- Newport State Airport (Rhode Island) in Middletown (near Newport), Rhode Island, United States
- Newport State Airport (Vermont) in Newport, Vermont, United States

== See also ==
- Newport Municipal Airport (disambiguation)
