= Patrick Leahy Burlington International Airport =

Public airport in Burlington, Vermont, United States

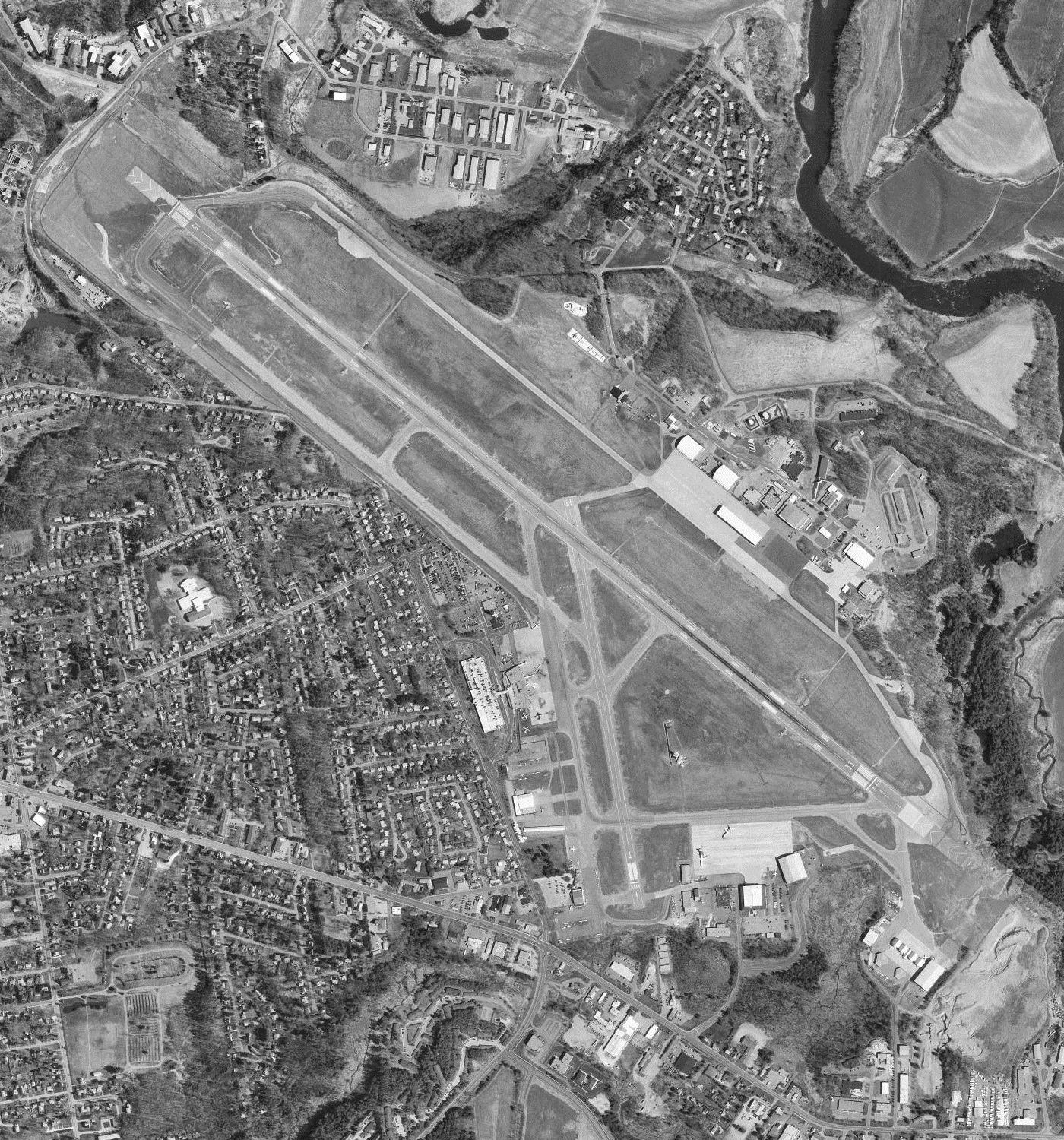
- USGS aerial image, 1995
- IATA: BTV; ICAO: KBTV; FAA LID: BTV

Summary
- Airport type: Military/public
- Owner: City of Burlington
- Operator: Burlington Airport Commission
- Serves: City of Burlington, State of Vermont, and Southern Quebec
- Location: South Burlington, Vermont, U.S.
- Time zone: GMT (UTC-5 or UTC-4 (Daylight Savings))
- Elevation AMSL: 335 ft (102 m)
- Coordinates: 44°28′19″N 073°09′12″W
- Website: www.btv.aero

Maps
- FAA airport diagram
- Interactive map of Patrick Leahy Burlington International Airport

Runways
Direction	Length		Surface
Direction	ft	m	Surface
15/33	8,319	2,536	Asphalt/concrete
1/19	4,112	1,253	Asphalt

Statistics (2025)
- Aircraft operations: 83,016
- Total passengers: 1,431,834
- Sources: FAA and airport website, official site

Patrick Leahy Burlington International Airport (IATA: BTV, ICAO: KBTV, FAA LID: BTV) is a joint-use civil-military airport serving Burlington, Vermont's most populous city, and its metropolitan area. Owned by the City of Burlington, the airport itself is located in neighboring South Burlington, just three nautical miles (6 km) east of Burlington's central business district.

It is by far the busiest airport in Vermont, with 100 times the traffic of the second-busiest, Rutland–Southern Vermont Regional Airport. It is the only airport in the state with mainline commercial service. As of 2015, around 40% of the airport's passengers come from Quebec, Canada.

In 2019, the airport had 687,436 passenger boardings according to Federal Aviation Administration (FAA) records, an increase of 4.33% from the year prior. This airport is included in the FAA's National Plan of Integrated Airport Systems for 2021–2025, which categorized it as a primary commercial service airport (more than 10,000 enplanements per year).

The airport serves as the base of the 158th Fighter Wing, Vermont Air National Guard and an Army Aviation Support Facility (AASF) of the Vermont Army National Guard and the Vermont State Guard.

In 2023, the airport was renamed to honor former U.S. senator Patrick Leahy.

== History ==
On Saturday, August 14, 1920, the first aircraft landed at what became the Burlington Municipal Airport. The pilot was Captain Hubert Stanford Broad, who served in the Air Forces of Great Britain during World War I. He circled the city of Burlington, did a few stunts for awaiting spectators and landed his Avro plane in the new field north of Williston Road. This marked Burlington Airport's first fly-in.

Not long after the Wright Brothers took to the air in a powered flying machine, WWI pilot and future Mayor of Burlington, Johnny Burns, Aviation Commissioner Mason Beebe and Chamber of Commerce secretary James Taylor raised funds to purchase the land and transformed the field into a landing strip in 1920.

The airstrip was leveled using a horse-drawn grader and steamroller owned by the City of Burlington. The airport office was configured in the 1853 Eldridge Schoolhouse, which was relocated to the airfield by Burlington City crews. Technology was nonexistent. In 1921, there were no instruments or beacons to guide pilots to a safe landing. Instead, a circle of crushed limestone showed pilots where to land.

After improvements to the landing field, the Burlington Municipal Airport—Vermont's Aerodrome—was formally recognized at a dedication ceremony on September 22, 1921, by Governor Hartness, a pilot himself. Also, in 1921, when J. Holmes Jackson was Mayor, the airport came under the management of the City of Burlington.

In 1928, after further improvements, Burlington received recognition from the Aeronautical Chamber of Commerce of America, and the local Board of Airport Commissioners was formed. Initial steps were taken toward making the airport financially sustainable when the commission established the first set of fees—renting hangar space. By 1930, traveling to Albany or Montreal could be done in record time when Curtiss-Wright Flying introduced service for both passengers and freight.

=== 1930s ===
The airport has attracted aviation record setters. Post and Gatty were the stars of an air meet in Burlington in 1931.

Grace Hall Pugh was Vermont's "First Lady of Aviation." A teacher from Ferrisburgh, Vermont, and the stepdaughter of Arthur Ashley, BTV's first airport manager, Pugh received a learner's permit to fly in 1932, and became the first licensed female pilot in Vermont in 1938. "When I got my first license, she said, there wasn't an Aeronautics Board. I got my license from the Motor Vehicle Department."

During this period, Harold Hugh, a skilled pilot, was managing the airport and became the president of the newly formed Vermont Pilot's Association.

On May 22, 1934, Amelia Earhart was presented with the keys to the City of Burlington at the airport. Renowned for her solo flights across the Atlantic and the continental U.S., Amelia Earhart's vision for the future of flying was for flight to become a conventional means of travel for everyone. She used her celebrity status to promote this idea during her visit to Burlington in 1934. Arriving at the airport on a Central Vermont/Boston-Maine Airways Stinson Trimotor, a company she helped found and of which she was vice president, she was greeted by 2,000 people.

Also in 1934, hundreds of Civil Works Administration temporary workers helped to prepare the north–south runway and apron for hard surfacing, using equipment from City of Burlington Public Works.

In 1935 Earhart returned to Vermont to speak at the Vermont State House in support of increased aviation in the region.

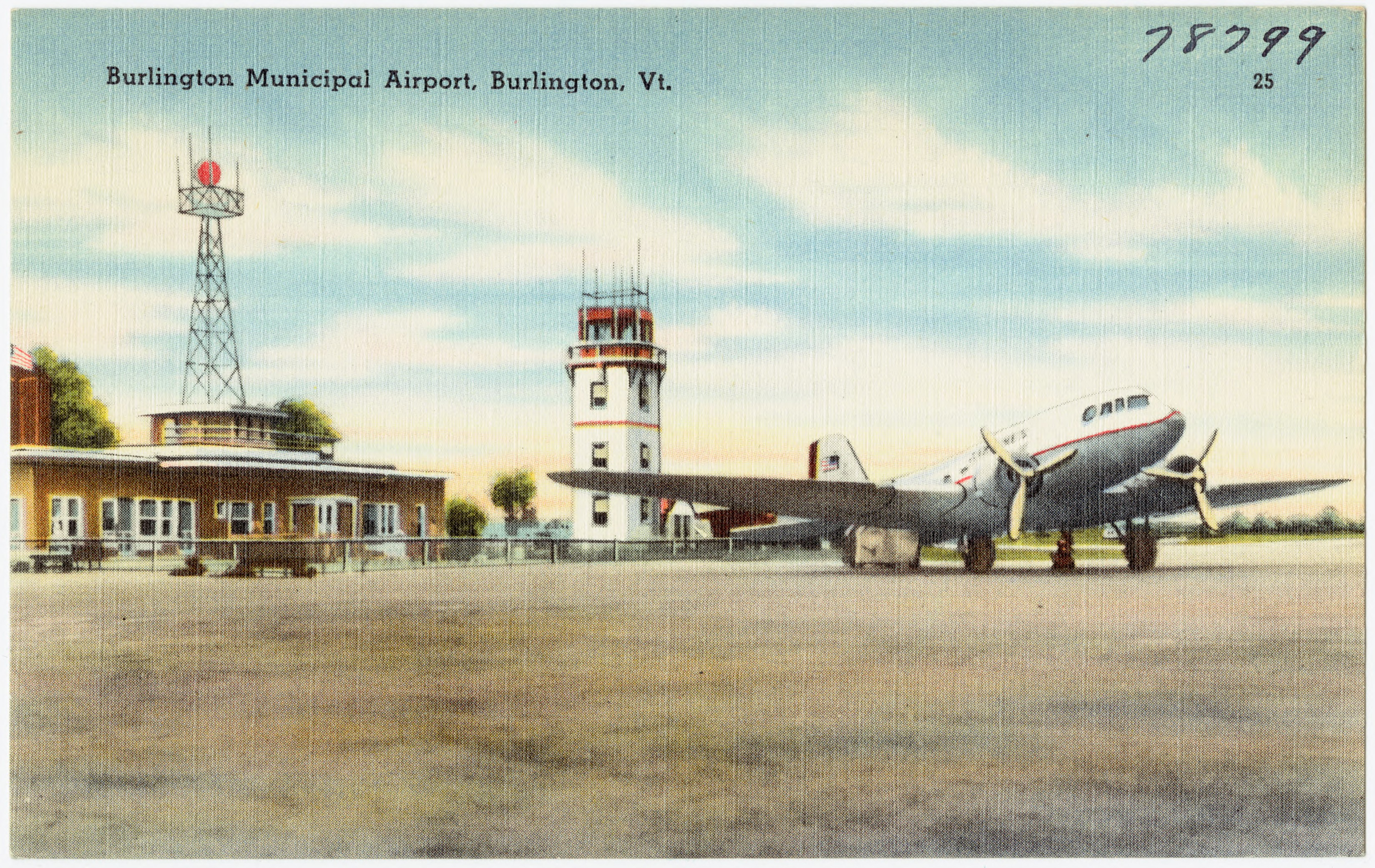
Burlington Municipal Airport c.1940s

In 1941, 75 acres of land adjacent to the airport were purchased through a City of Burlington bond as part of a major upgrade of the airport.

=== World War II ===
With the onset of the World War II, the United States federal government created a Defense Zone extending inland 150 miles (240 km) from the coastline, where private aircraft were restricted from operating. Burlington Municipal Airport was located approximately 3 miles (4.8 km) outside of the Defense Zone, allowing it to conduct pilot training both locally and from other airports located within the restricted zone, one such example being Boston's Logan Airport. Due to increased demand, the Burlington Municipal Airport was noted as being the busiest airport in the world on both August 14, 1942, and February 11, 1943, with 662 and 793 landings, respectively.

During the Defense Zone period, flight training at the airport, led by Harold High, numbered over 100 pilots. The airport averaged 4 to 6 landings an hour for every 24-hour period.

In 1948 airport manager Hugh Finnegan saw the airport through tremendous expansion. By the time of his unexpected death in 1958, BTV consisted of 942 acres (up from 72 in 1920), boasted a new terminal and modern control tower, improved runways, and thoroughly accommodated the swelling ranks and infrastructure needs of the Vermont National Guard.

Presidential candidate John F. Kennedy visited the airport on November 7, 1960. The next day he won the presidency.

In 1964 then-Michigan congressman Gerald Ford joined a celebration at BTV to commemorate Mohawk's new jet service at the airport. People could now fly from BTV to JFK in a mere 42 minutes. A few years later, Expo '67, Montreal's World's Fair, gave rise to another Mohawk jet route: direct service between BTV and Montreal. By the end of the '60s, BTV was serving about 100,000 passengers annually. On February 24, 1969, the Burlington Board of Aldermen voted to change the airport's title from "municipal" to "international" as a means of re-branding the airport and steering it away from the perceptions of it being a small, community-based airport.

In 1970 Mohawk Airlines introduced the first jet service to the airport.

On May 11, 1971, Burlington voters approved a $1.25 million bond for a new 40,000-square-foot (3,700 m^{2}) terminal that opened on October 7, 1973.

Burlington's airport manager from 1983 to 1986 was Walt Houghton, a pilot who commuted from Shelburne, Vermont, in his 1941 N3N Biplane, "Yellow Bird."

The 1980s saw further expansion. People Express, the first no-frills airline, started service at Burlington in 1982. Air Vermont also offered service to Portland, Boston, Albany and Newport in the early 1980s, while Air North flew to Plattsburgh, Albany, Saranac Lake, Boston, Poughkeepsie and White Plains. With the airport's combined 400,000 passengers, parking was a challenge, the terminal was crowded, the restaurant was full, and office space for airport workers was at a premium. This surge in business prompted yet another expansion of the airport. In October 1984, Houghton and the Airport Commission shared plans for major development. The terminal would go from 40,000 to 61,000 square feet, providing additional space for a single departure lounge, an expanded baggage claim area, and more concession stands. New enclosed walkways for boarding were a welcome relief for passengers, especially in winter. Additional space to accommodate future airlines was included in the plan, as well. In 1986, funded primarily by the FAA, crews broke ground on the project.

Just before the new millennium, BTV experienced the sting of competition. Southwest Airlines began flying out of Manchester, New Hampshire, with low fares that prompted travelers to drive south to save money. The BTV team, headed by airport manager, JJ Hamilton, began negotiations with the brand new, low-cost carrier, JetBlue. The deal was successful.

=== 2000s ===
In 2000, JetBlue started flying to BTV, serving JFK.

In November 2001 the TSA imposed heightened security procedures at all airports. Before 9/11, security at BTV was a minor part of the annual budget and operations. The airport's security needs were handled by a small team of Burlington Police Department officers. Today, at BTV and all U.S. airports, security is managed by TSA, an agency of the Department of Homeland Security.

The airport set a local record in July 2008 when 759,154 passengers flew from Burlington, the first time the figure crossed 700,000. However, FAA data from 2015 showed a decrease to 598,494 total enplaned, a significant decrease given stronger regional competition due to the increasing popularity of the recently constructed and renovated Plattsburgh International Airport in Plattsburgh, NY.

The airport serves its metropolitan area, which contained over 219,433 residents as of 2019 U.S. census estimates. Due to the relatively small size of the market, airlines mostly fly regional airliners on their Burlington routes. Among these are Bombardier CRJ-200, CRJ-700, and CRJ-900 and Embraer ERJ-145 and ERJ-175 regional jets operated by most of the major carriers. United Airlines, Delta Air Lines and American Airlines notably fly some of the only daily flights using mainline aircraft. Currently, the largest scheduled passenger planes to fly out of Burlington are Airbus A320 and Boeing 737 family aircraft flown by United Airlines, A320s flown by Delta Air Lines and A319s flown to PHL flown year-round by American Airlines. Denver, Colorado, is the farthest destination served by any airline out of BTV.

In 2008, Big Sky Airlines stopped flying the Boston route.

On February 3, 2010, AirTran Airways announced that it would not be returning to Burlington. Service started in early 2009 on Boeing 717 aircraft operating 55-minute flights from Baltimore, but after six months, AirTran changed BTV to seasonal service, operating during the summer months. AirTran planned on resuming service in the spring of 2010, but for unspecified reasons, they did not. AirTran service lasted for eight months in 2009. Allegiant Air ended service from BTV in March 2017.

In 2010, a city-owned cable provider was unable to pay the city of Burlington the $17 million it owed. As a result, Moody's downrated the debt for the city as well as the airport's credit rating. Although voters approved a $21.5 million bond for airport expansion, this downgrade made borrowing the money too expensive. The airport, therefore, borrowed $7.5 million from the city for a $14.5 million garage expansion. In June 2011, the city asked for the money back. The airport was in the process of expanding the parking garage by adding two more levels on the north end, which would have given it a total of 2,700 parking spaces. The project was later completed in early 2012.

A reconstructed, Burgess-Wright biplane circa 1912 hangs from the ceiling in the main concourse. The mezzanine level includes an exhibit highlighting Native American Abenaki culture. Installations throughout the airport feature Vermont artists.

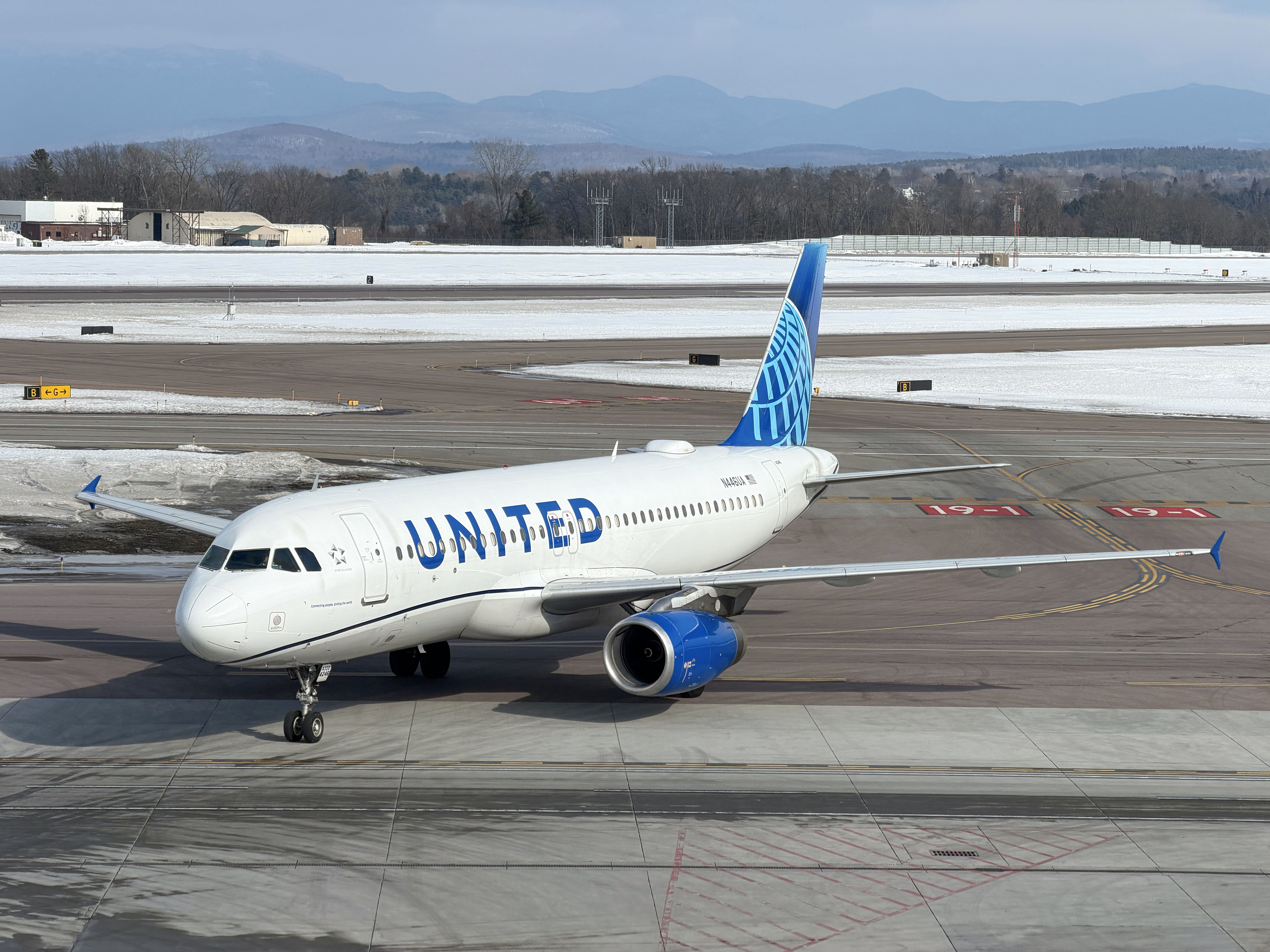
A United Airlines A320 taxiing at Burlington

The end of the 2000s saw 15 different commercial carriers, three cargo/freight carriers, and Vermont Air National Guard's F-16s flying in and out of the airport. About 1.5 million people passed through the terminal annually. Between 2011 and 2018, Porter Airlines offered winter seasonal service from Billy Bishop Toronto City Airport to Burlington Airport, though the route was dropped due to delays over customs and immigration facility at the Burlington Airport.

In collaboration with the City of Burlington and Burlington Electric Department, BTV installed a 2000-panel solar array on the rooftop of the airport's northern garage and partnered with Tesla to bring twelve electric charging stations to the airport in 2019.

In 2020, the airport had fifteen gates serving five airlines.

In April 2023, Burlington mayor Miro Weinberger announced the renaming of the airport as the Patrick Leahy Burlington International Airport in honor of former U.S. senator Patrick Leahy.

In October 2023, JetBlue announced it would stop flying to JFK. The last flight to JFK was in January 2024.

In January 2024, Breeze Airways started flights to Orlando. It then added flights to Raleigh and Jacksonville.

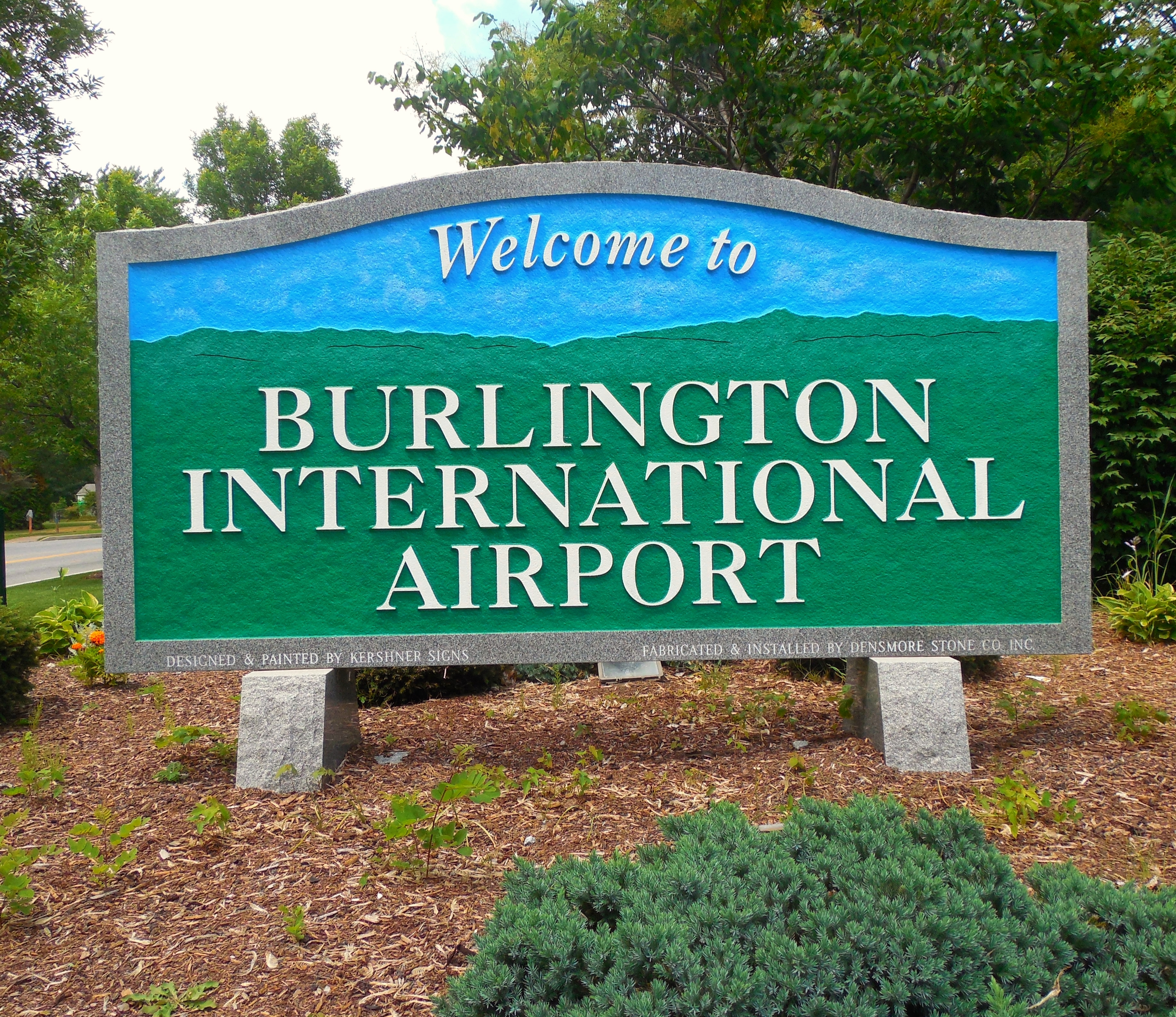
BIA main entrance sign

== Facilities and aircraft ==
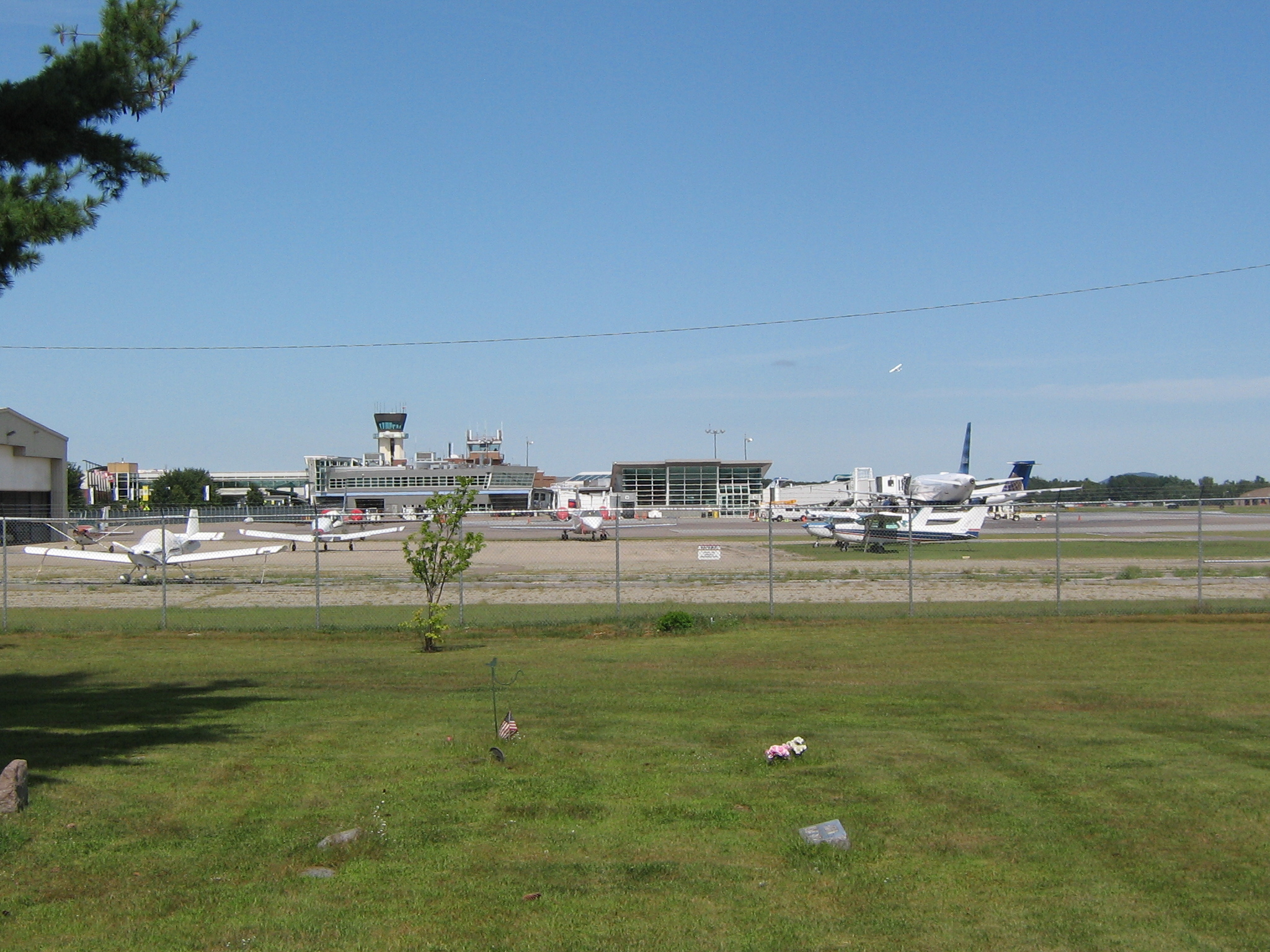
A general aviation ramp at BTV with the passenger terminal and tower in background

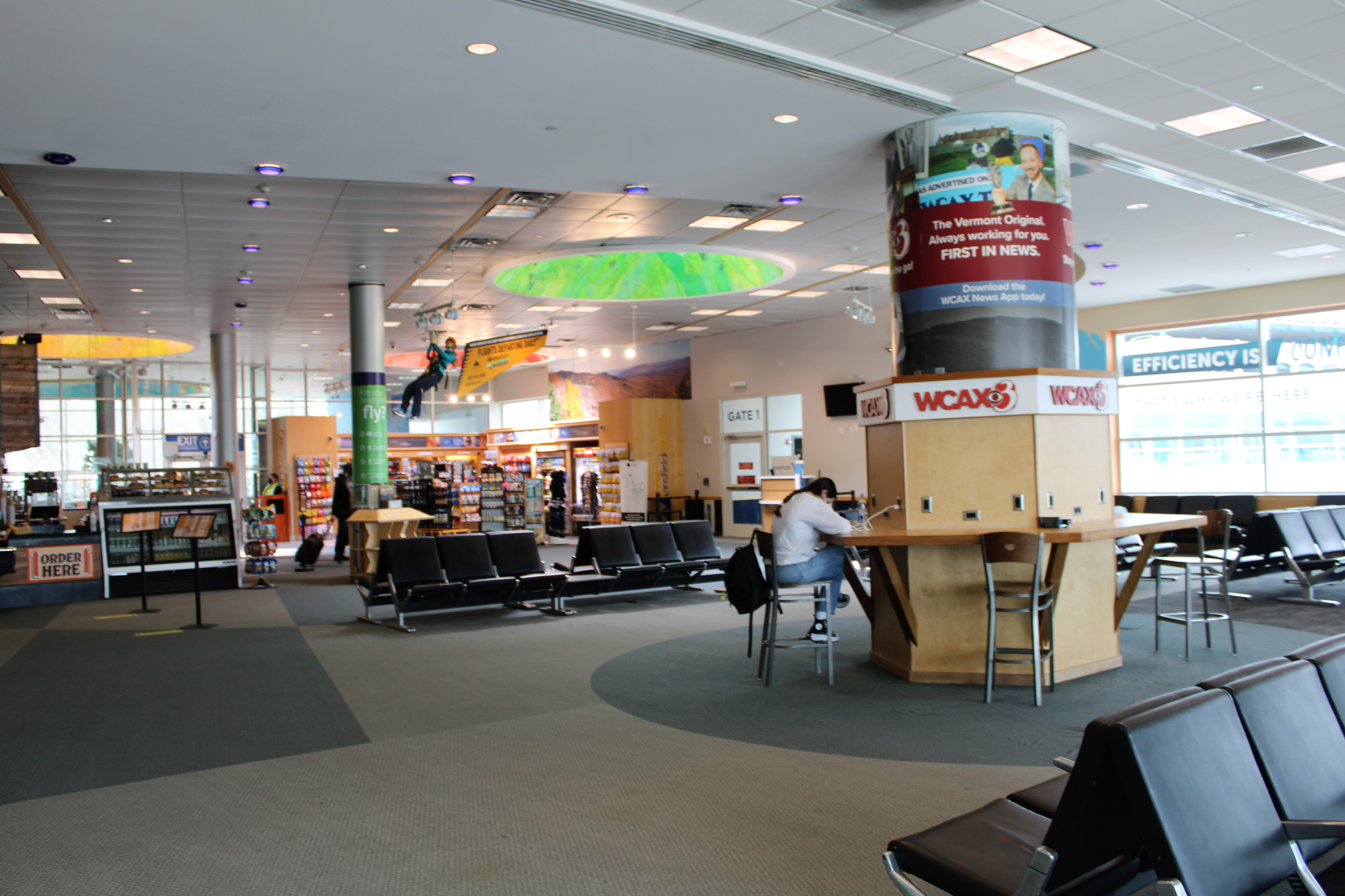
Gate 1

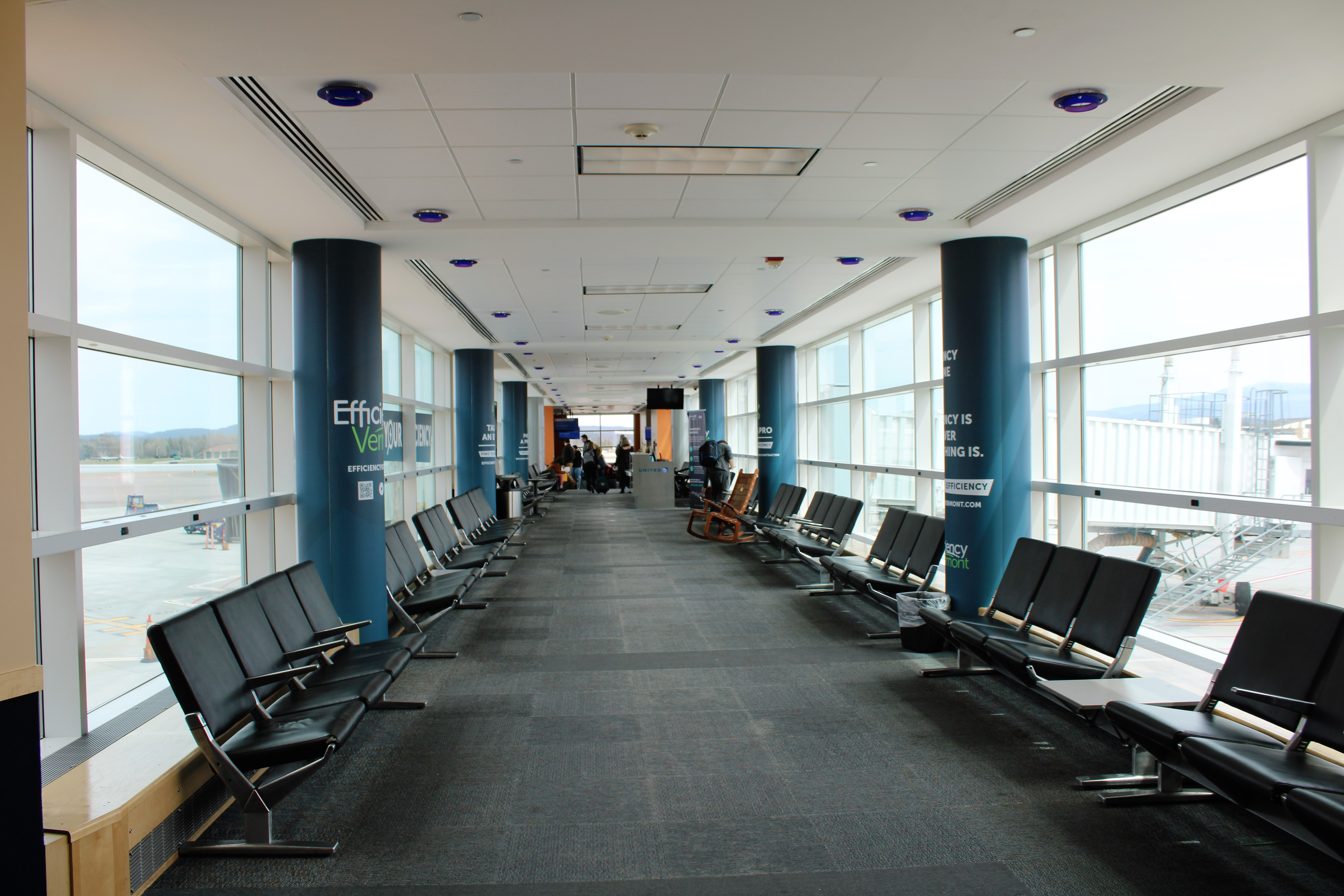
Gates 3–6

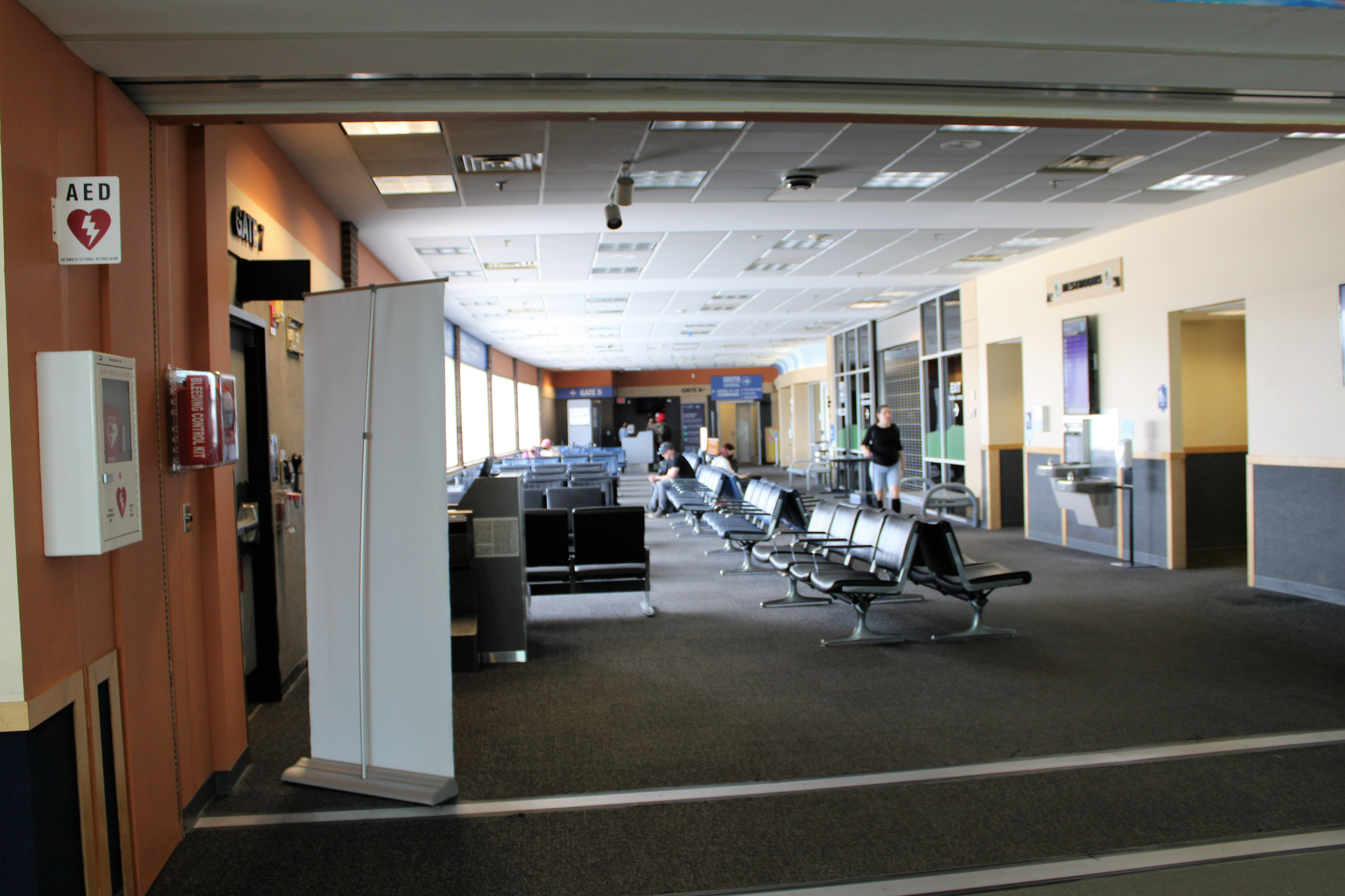
Gate 8

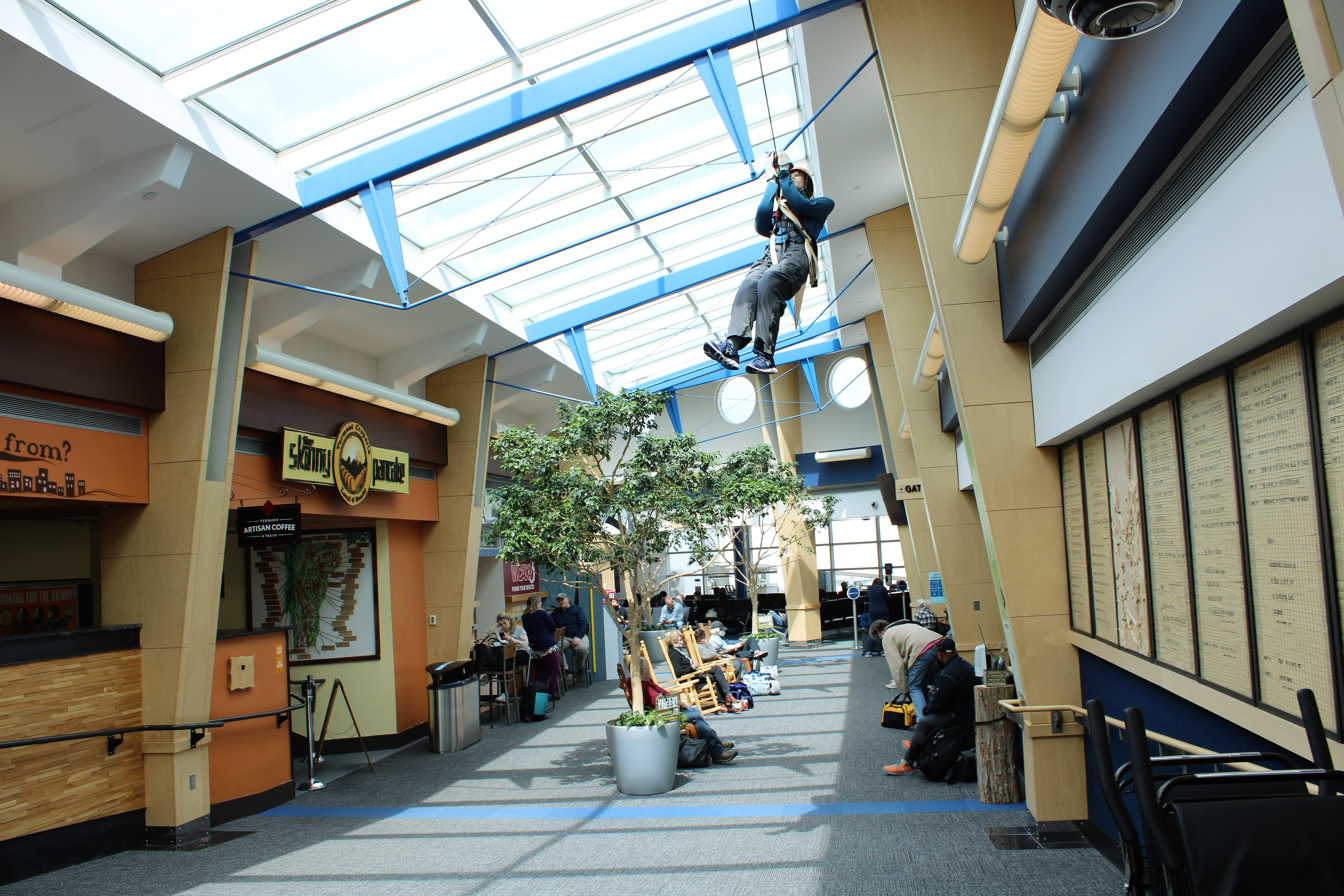
Gates 11–14

Burlington International Airport covers an area of 942 acres (381 ha) at an elevation of 335 feet (102 m) above mean sea level. It has two runways: 15/33 is 8,319 by 150 feet (2,536 × 46 m) with an asphalt and concrete surface; 1/19 is 4,112 by 75 feet (1,253 × 23 m) with an asphalt surface.

Heritage Aviation is providing services such as de-icing, hangars and customs service for international traffic. The company is also the sole provider of fueling services for general aviation, commercial, and Vermont Army National Guard aircraft.

In 2009, the Airport Authority sought $45 million for a parking expansion, providing 1,400 additional spaces onto the current 3-story, 2,100 spaces garage. It would hold 3,500 cars within 5 stories. Completed in late 2011, the extension had half of the proposed parking spaces.

As of May 2022, annual aircraft operations averaged 250 per day: 68% general aviation, 10% air taxi, 16% scheduled commercial, and 7% military, with 130 aircraft based at the airport.

=== Military facilities ===
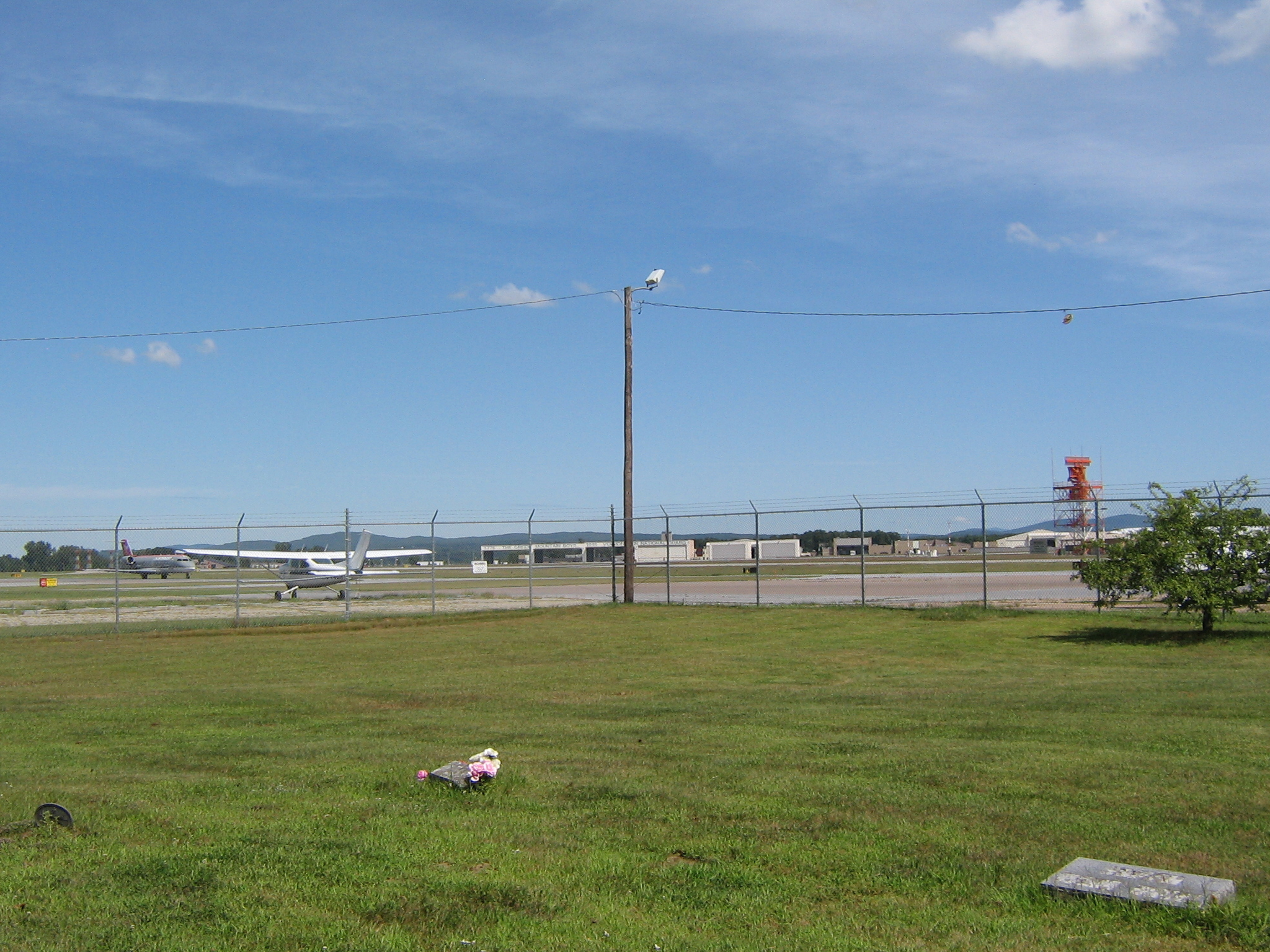
The ANG ramp, supporting the Green Mountain Boys squadron

The airport hosts two military installations. The first is Burlington Air National Guard Base and the 158th Fighter Wing (158 FW) based there, an Air Combat Command (ACC)-gained unit of the Vermont Air National Guard, flying the F-35 since August 2019. The 158 FW consists of approximately 1,000 Air National Guard personnel, both full-time Active Guard and Reserve (AGR) and Air Reserve Technician (ART) personnel and traditional part-time Air National Guardsmen.

The second installation is an Army Aviation Support Facility (AASF) of the Vermont Army National Guard where the 1st Battalion, 103d Aviation Regiment and the 86th Medical Company (Air Ambulance) is based.

The airport is the muster point for the Air Wing of the Vermont State Guard.

== Airlines and destinations ==
Airlines	Destinations
American Airlines	Seasonal: Charlotte, Philadelphia, Washington–National
American Eagle	Charlotte, New York–LaGuardia, Philadelphia, Washington–National; Seasonal: Chicago–O'Hare
Breeze Airways	Baltimore, Myrtle Beach (begins May 27, 2027), Orlando, Raleigh/Durham; Seasonal: Charleston (SC), Fort Myers, Tampa
Delta Air Lines	Atlanta
Delta Connection	Detroit, New York–JFK, New York–LaGuardia; Seasonal: Minneapolis/St. Paul
United Airlines	Chicago–O'Hare; Seasonal: Denver, Newark
United Express	Newark, Washington–Dulles; Seasonal: Houston–Intercontinental

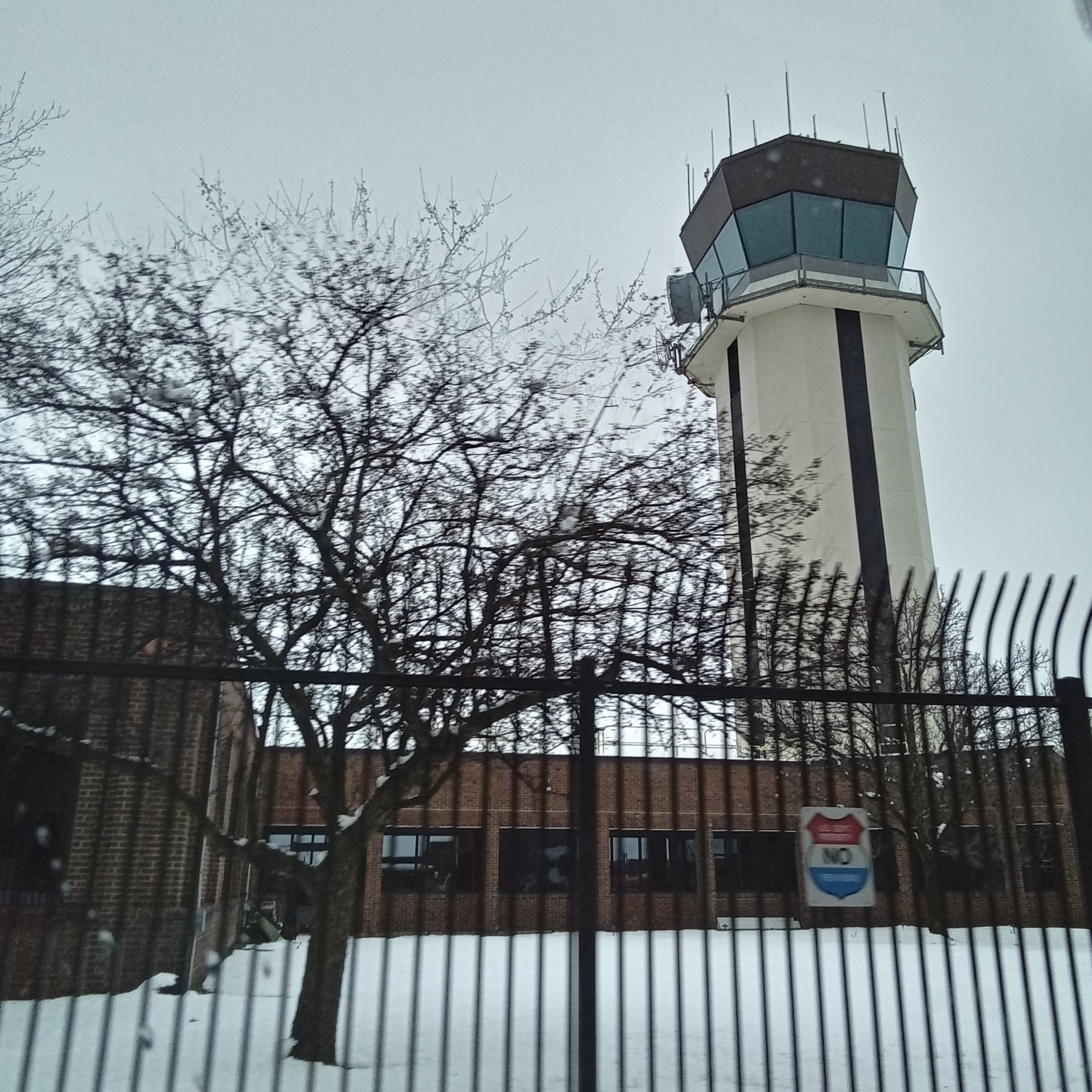
ATC Tower Of KBTV

Destinations map
Destinations from Burlington International Airport (BTV)
Red = Year-round destination
Green = Seasonal destination
Blue = Future destination

== Statistics ==
=== Top destinations ===
Busiest domestic destinations from BTV (August 2025 – July 2026)
Rank	City	Airport	Passengers	Carriers
1	Chicago, Illinois	ORD	123,100	American, United
2	Philadelphia, Pennsylvania	PHL	74,920	American
3	Arlington, Virginia	DCA	70,060	American
4	Dulles, Virginia	IAD	60,200	United
5	Newark, New Jersey	EWR	56,900	United
6	(Georgia (U.S. state)) Atlanta, Georgia	ATL	49,590	Delta
7	Detroit, Michigan	DTW	47,080	Delta
8	Charlotte, North Carolina	CLT	42,130	American
9	(New York (state)) New York City	LGA	38,670	American, Delta
10	(New York (state)) New York City	JFK	38,430	Delta

=== Airline market share ===
Largest airlines at BTV (August 2025 – July 2026)
Rank	Airline	Passengers	Share
1	United Airlines	270,000	19.38%
2	PSA Airlines	261,000	18.76%
3	Endeavor Air	219,000	15.75%
4	Republic Airways	132,000	9.46%
5	Delta Air Lines	99,760	7.16%
	Other	411,000	29.49%

=== Air cargo service ===
Both major commercial parcel carriers (UPS Airlines and FedEx Express) fly into BTV, providing service for much of northern Vermont. UPS uses Wiggins Airways to ferry packages between Burlington and larger cargo hubs.

FedEx Express in fact operates the largest aircraft to frequently use the airport. Cargo is flown in from the company's hub in Newark, NJ, via Syracuse, NY or Portland, Maine, aboard medium ranged Boeing 757-200 aircraft (up until 2011 this was done by aging Boeing 727-200s before these aircraft were replaced by the newer, more versatile 757s). Upon arriving from Syracuse or Portland some of the cargo is unloaded from the 757 distributed to smaller, propeller-driven Cessna 208Bs operated by Wiggins Airways and flown to closer destinations such as Bangor and other destinations.

UPS flies exclusive connection flights with aircraft from Wiggins Airways to airports in the Northeast with Cessna 208s and small jet aircraft.

Airlines	Destinations
FedEx Express	Memphis, Portland (ME), Syracuse
UPS Airlines operated by Wiggins Airways	Bangor, Manchester (NH), Rutland

=== Accidents at or near BTV ===
On January 29, 1990, a Cessna 208B Grand Caravan operated by Airborne Express struck trees and crashed 1 mile SE of Burlington International Airport in snowy conditions. The aircraft was overloaded with cargo and failure to de-ice the plane prior to departure caused the plane to stall and crash. Both occupants were killed.

== See also ==
- List of airports in Vermont
