= Deerfield Valley Regional Airport =

Airport in Windham County, Vermont

- IATA: none; ICAO: none; FAA LID: 4V8

Summary
- Airport type: Closed (was: Public use)
- Owner: Deerfield Valley Regional Airport, LLC
- Serves: West Dover, Vermont
- Location: Windham County, Vermont
- Elevation AMSL: 1,953 ft (595 m)
- Coordinates: 42°55′38″N 072°51′56″W
- Website: vtrans.vermont.gov/aviation/airports/deerfield-valley

Map
- Interactive map of Deerfield Valley Regional Airport

Runways
Direction	Length		Surface
Direction	ft	m	Surface
1/19	2,650	808	Asphalt

Statistics (2013)
- Aircraft operations: 3,100
- Based aircraft: 7
- Source: FAA

Deerfield Valley Regional Airport (FAA LID: 4V8) (formerly Mount Snow Airport) was a privately owned, public use airport located one nautical mile (2 km) southwest of the central business district of West Dover, in Windham County, Vermont, United States.

The airport was permanently closed by FAA NOTAM on June 3, 2019.

The airport's location was within 5 miles of three visitor attractions: the Hermitage Club, the Hermitage Golf Course, and Mount Snow ski area.

== Facilities and aircraft ==
The property covers an area of 35 acres (14 ha) at an elevation of 1,953 feet (595 m) above mean sea level. It has one runway designated 1/19 with an asphalt surface measuring 2,650 by 75 feet (808 x 23 m).

For the 12-month period ending July 8, 2013, the airport had 3,100 general aviation aircraft operations, an average of 258 per month. At that time there were seven aircraft based at this airport: 5 (71%) single-engine and 2 (29%) multi-engine.

== Scheduled Services ==
During the 2012-2019 time period, seasonal passenger flights were available from Westchester County Airport in White Plains, NY to Deerfield Valley Airport. The service was provided by Tradewind Aviation, an air taxi service that operates 8-seat Pilatus PC-12 aircraft.

== See also ==
- List of airports in Vermont
