= Middlebury State Airport =

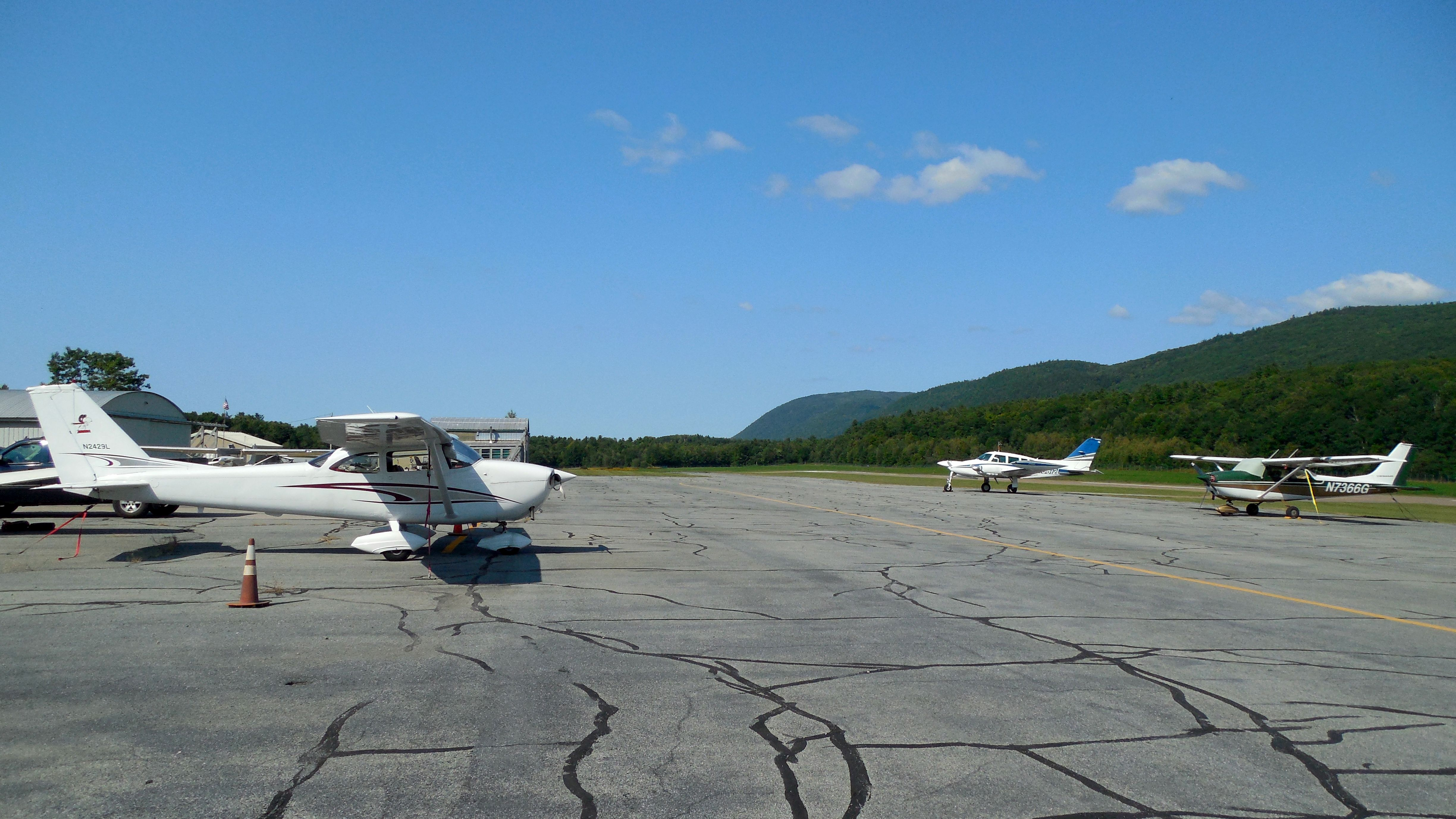
- IATA: none; ICAO: none; FAA LID: 6B0

Summary
- Airport type: Public
- Owner: State of Vermont
- Serves: Middlebury, Vermont
- Elevation AMSL: 490 ft (150 m)
- Coordinates: 43°59′05.218″N 073°05′45.416″W
- Website: vtrans.vermont.gov/aviation/airports/middlebury

Map
- Interactive map of Middlebury State Airport

Runways
Direction	Length		Surface
Direction	ft	m	Surface
01/19	2,506	762	Asphalt

Statistics (2008)
- Aircraft operations: 16,451
- Based aircraft: 48
- Source: Federal Aviation Administration

Middlebury State Airport (FAA LID: 6B0) is a public use airport in Addison County, Vermont, United States. It is owned by the State of Vermont and is located three nautical miles (5.56 km) southeast of the central business district of Middlebury, Vermont.

Although most U.S. airports use the same three-letter location identifier for the FAA and IATA, this airport is assigned 6B0 by the FAA but has no designation from the IATA

== Facilities and aircraft ==
Middlebury State Airport covers an area of 156 acres (63 ha) at an elevation of 490 feet (149 m) above mean sea level. It has one runway designated 01/19 with an asphalt surface measuring 3,206 by 60 feet (977 x 18 m). Runway 1-19 is oriented in a north–south direction and has visual approaches. The runway is unlit and lacks an Automated Airport Weather Station (AWOS/ASOS). It has a weight bearing capacity 12,000 lbs. per single wheel.

The aircraft parking aprons at the facility are approximately 87,000 ft^{2} and encompass approximately 170,000 ft^{2} of area. The principal apron is located northwest of Runway 19 and has the capacity to hold 42 aircraft. The secondary apron is located in front of the terminal building and has the capacity for 10 aircraft. A small fueling apron is located between the two parking aprons. Aircraft tie-down spaces are leased by the facility's FBO from the State of Vermont.

For the 12-month period ending May 30, 2008, the airport had 16,451 aircraft operations, an average of 45 per day: 91% general aviation, 5% military, 4% air taxi and a few ultralights. At that time there were 48 aircraft based at this airport: 77% single-engine, 10% multi-engine, 4% jet, 4% helicopter, 2% glider and 2% ultralights.

== History ==
The original airport facility was developed by the Quesnel Family in the 1950s in support of their aerial pesticide application business. In 1966, the Town of Middlebury purchased the facility. In 1970, it was acquired by State of Vermont Aeronautics Board and formally named "Middlebury State Airport".

== Improvements ==
In 1976 the Army National Guard constructed a gravel taxiway parallel to the runway. In 1990, a tie-down apron was constructed. In 1993, an aviation fueling system was installed. In 2000, Runway 1-19 was reconstructed and repaved. In 2003, a terminal building and hangar were constructed.

In 2009, the FAA approved a Finding of No Significant Impact to increase the runway width by 10 ft., and the length by 700 ft. (i.e. the runway would expand to 3,206 ft. length x 60 ft. width). This expansion would make it possible for the airport to accommodate small jets. The State of Vermont 2007 Airport System & Policy Plan calls for ‘Local Service Airports’ (such as the Middlebury Airport) to increase their runways to 4,000 ft. length x 75 ft. width, pending appropriate land acquisitions and completion of environmental review and permitting.

As of 2015, residents living near the airport in East Middlebury have called for a halt on the State's plan to expand the facility citing noise, environmental, and economic concerns. On June 9, 2015, the Town of Middlebury Selectboard voted in favor of the project (5 to 2). The proposed $3.5m project would entail acquiring the navigation easements from property owners abutting the southern approach of the runway (for tree removal, which addresses current visibility concerns for pilots), reconstructing and extending the taxiway in 2017, and extending the runway by 700 ft. at the northern terminus in 2018.

== See also ==
- List of airports in Vermont
