= Highgate, Vermont =

- Town
- Location in Franklin County and the state of Vermont
- Coordinates: 44°58′10″N 73°03′24″W
- Country: United States
- State: Vermont
- County: Franklin
- Communities: Highgate Center; Highgate Falls; Highgate Springs; Beaulieus Corner; East Highgate

Area
  - Total: 59.7 sq mi (154.7 km^{2})
  - Land: 50.7 sq mi (131.4 km^{2})
  - Water: 9.0 sq mi (23.3 km^{2})
- Elevation: 302 ft (92 m)

Population (2020)
  - Total: 3,472
  - Density: 68/sq mi (26.4/km^{2})
- Time zone: UTC-5 (Eastern (EST))
  - Summer (DST): UTC-4 (EDT)
- ZIP Codes: 05459 (Highgate Center); 05460 (Highgate Springs); 05488 (Swanton); 05478 (St. Albans); 05483 (Sheldon); 05457 (Franklin)
- Area code: 802
- FIPS code: 50-33025
- GNIS feature ID: 1462118
- Website: highgatevt.org

Highgate is a town in Franklin County, Vermont, United States. The population was 3,472 at the 2020 census. The town is on the Canada–US border and is a border town with Philipsburg, Quebec.

== History ==
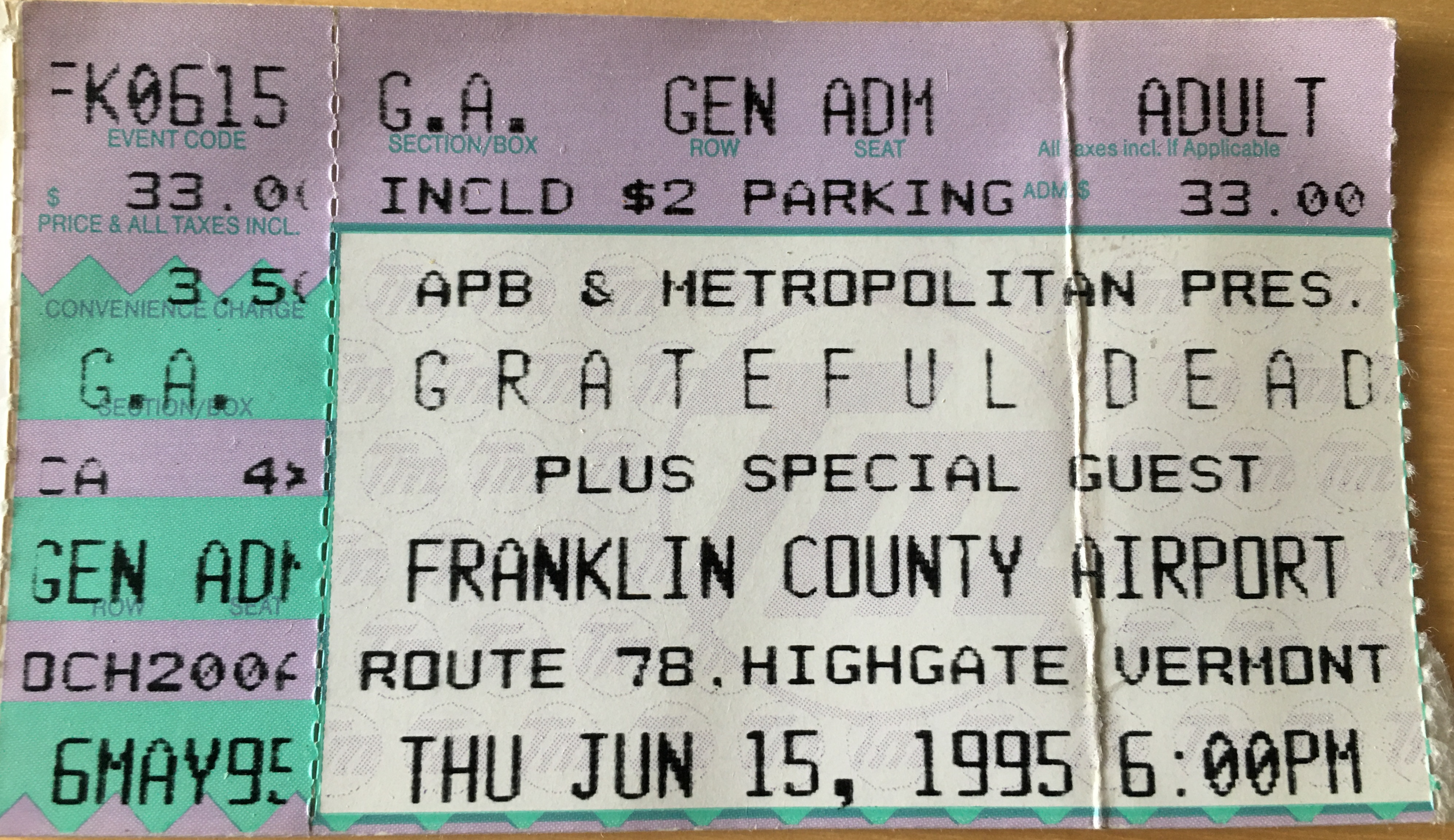
1995 Grateful Dead concert ticket

Highgate was named after Highgate in England.

The Grateful Dead played two shows in Highgate at the Franklin County State Airport in July 1994 and June 1995. An estimated 60,000 people attended in 1994 and an estimated 100,000 in 1995, when Bob Dylan opened and on-site camping was allowed.

In town, there is an egg farm which has 100,000 chickens. In 2008, the farm wanted to double its operation, requiring state permission. Neighbors objected to this increase.

== Geography ==
Highgate is in northwestern Franklin County. The northern border of the town is the Canada–United States border. It is one of the communities that is intersected by the 45th parallel north. U.S. Route 7 and Interstate 89 pass through the town, intersecting at I-89's Exit 22, just south of the international border. The two highways lead south to Swanton, St. Albans, and Burlington. Vermont Route 78 crosses the southern part of town, passing through the communities of Highgate Center and East Highgate. Route 78 leads southwest into Swanton and southeast into Sheldon. Vermont Route 207 passes through the eastern part of Highgate, connecting Highgate Center with Morses Line at the border. Communities within the town include Highgate Center, Highgate Falls, East Highgate, and Highgate Springs.

According to the United States Census Bureau, the town has a total area of 59.7 square miles (154.7 km^{2}), of which 50.7 square miles (131.4 km^{2}) is land and 9.0 square miles (23.3 km^{2}), or 15.08%, is water. The Missisquoi and Rock rivers, tributaries of Lake Champlain, flow through the town. The northwest corner of town is within Missisquoi Bay, an arm of Lake Champlain.

=== Surrounding areas ===
- Saint-Armand, Quebec, Canada
- Franklin
- Sheldon
- Swanton
- Alburgh

== Demographics ==
Historical population
| Census | Pop. | Note | %± |
|---|---|---|---|
| 1790 | 103 | | — |
| 1800 | 437 | | 324.3% |
| 1810 | 1,374 | | 214.4% |
| 1820 | 1,250 | | −9.0% |
| 1830 | 2,038 | | 63.0% |
| 1840 | 2,292 | | 12.5% |
| 1850 | 2,653 | | 15.8% |
| 1860 | 2,526 | | −4.8% |
| 1870 | 2,260 | | −10.5% |
| 1880 | 2,088 | | −7.6% |
| 1890 | 1,853 | | −11.3% |
| 1900 | 1,980 | | 6.9% |
| 1910 | 1,758 | | −11.2% |
| 1920 | 1,528 | | −13.1% |
| 1930 | 1,574 | | 3.0% |
| 1940 | 1,647 | | 4.6% |
| 1950 | 1,681 | | 2.1% |
| 1960 | 1,608 | | −4.3% |
| 1970 | 1,936 | | 20.4% |
| 1980 | 2,493 | | 28.8% |
| 1990 | 3,020 | | 21.1% |
| 2000 | 3,397 | | 12.5% |
| 2010 | 3,535 | | 4.1% |
| 2020 | 3,472 | | −1.8% |
U.S. Decennial Census

As of the census of 2000, there were 3,397 people, 1,207 households, and 922 families residing in the town. The population density was 66.4 people per square mile (25.6/km^{2}). There were 1,375 housing units at an average density of 26.9 per square mile (10.4/km^{2}). The racial makeup of the town was 92.93% White, 0.03% African American, 4.21% Native American, 0.15% Asian, 0.03% Pacific Islander, 0.21% from other races, and 2.44% from two or more races. Hispanic or Latino of any race were 0.15% of the population.

Of the 1,207 households, 40.8% had children under the age of 18 living with them, 60.2% were married couples living together, 10.0% had a female householder with no husband present, and 23.6% were non-families. 16.6% of all households were made up of individuals, and 6.6% had someone living alone who was 65 years of age or older. The average household size was 2.81 and the average family size was 3.13.

In the town, the population was spread out, with 29.4% under the age of 18, 7.8% from 18 to 24, 32.6% from 25 to 44, 21.3% from 45 to 64, and 8.9% who were 65 years of age or older. The median age was 34 years. For every 100 females, there were 100.6 males. For every 100 females age 18 and over, there were 100.9 males.

The median income for a household in the town was $41,556, and the median income for a family was $44,697. Males had a median income of $30,342 versus $25,000 for females. The per capita income for the town was $16,505. About 7.4% of families and 10.0% of the population were below the poverty line, including 12.5% of those under age 18 and 8.3% of those age 65 or over.

== Points of interest ==
- Highgate Manor
- Franklin County State Airport
- Franklin County Field Days
- Tyler Place Family Resort

== Infrastructure ==
=== Electricity ===
Highgate has had an HVDC back-to-back station since 1985; it was built by Asea in the record time of eight months. It operates with a bipolar voltage of 56 kV, and can transfer a maximum power of 225 megawatts from Hydro-Quebec to the New England power grid or 190 megawatts from New England to Quebec. It was built on short notice because the Vermont Yankee nuclear power plant had an extended maintenance period approaching.

=== Natural gas ===
Vermont has one natural gas distribution company, Vermont Gas Systems, Inc. (VGS). VGS's gas is supplied from a connection at Highgate Springs to the TransCanada Pipeline.

=== Transportation ===
Located within the town is the Interstate 89 Highgate Springs–St. Armand/Philipsburg Border Crossing.

== Education ==
It is in the Franklin Northwest Supervisory Union school district.

== Notable people ==
- Heman Allen (1779–1852), U.S. congressman, U.S. Minister to Chile, resided in and practiced law in Highgate
- Roswell M. Austin (1887–1966), Speaker of the Vermont House of Representatives, born in Highgate
- Warren Austin (1877–1962), U.S. senator, United States Ambassador to the United Nations, born in Highgate Center
- Jeptha Bradley (1802–1864), Vermont Auditor of Accounts, served as postmaster in Highgate Springs
- Alexander Christie (1848–1925), Bishop of Vancouver Island and Archbishop of Oregon City, born in Highgate
- John Godfrey Saxe (1816–1887), author, born in Highgate hamlet of Saxe's Mills
