= Franklin County State Airport =

Coordinates: 44°56′25″N 073°05′51″W

- IATA: none; ICAO: KFSO; FAA LID: FSO

Summary
- Airport type: Public
- Owner: State of Vermont
- Serves: Franklin County, Vermont
- Location: Highgate, Vermont, U.S.
- Elevation AMSL: 228 ft / 69 m
- Website: vtrans.vermont.gov/aviation/airports/franklin-county

Maps
- FAA airport diagram
- Interactive map of Franklin County State Airport

Runways
Direction	Length		Surface
Direction	ft	m	Surface
1/19	3,000	914	Asphalt

Statistics (2009)
- Aircraft operations: 10,200
- Based aircraft: 86

Franklin County State Airport (ICAO: KFSO, FAA LID: FSO) is a public airport located three miles (5 km) west of the central business district of Highgate, a town in Franklin County, Vermont, United States. It is owned by the State of Vermont.

Although most U.S. airports use the same three-letter location identifier for the FAA and IATA, Franklin County State Airport is assigned FSO by the FAA but has no designation from the IATA.

== Facilities and aircraft ==
Franklin County State Airport covers an area of 348 acres (141 ha) which contains one asphalt paved runway (1/19) measuring 3,000 x 60 ft (914 x 18 m). For the 12-month period ending August 31, 2009, the airport had 10,200 aircraft operations, an average of 28 per day: 93% general aviation, 7% military and <1% air taxi. There are 86 aircraft based at this airport: 90% single engine, 3% multi-engine, 1% helicopters and 6% ultralights.

The airport was purchased by the State of Vermont and a new paved north-south runway was constructed in 1969.

For the last 25 years the airport has been known for the odd and unique aircraft based there.

Specializing in former Soviet Bloc aircraft, the FBO (Border Air Ltd.) has imported over 300 aircraft most notably the Yakovlev 52.

The airport is home to EAA Chapter 613 providing all aviation enthusiasts education and community.

The airport is one of the busiest state airports in Vermont for general aviation. To accommodate increased traffic, a runway extension and upgrade was completed in FY2024. The runway was extended by 1,000 feet and widened by 15 feet. A ramp extension and upgrade also took place in FY2024.

== Notable events ==
The Grateful Dead gave two performances at the airport: on July 13, 1994, and on June 15, 1995.

== See also ==
- List of airports in Vermont
