= Caledonia County Airport =

Airport in Lyndonville, Vermont, US

- IATA: LLX; ICAO: KCDA; FAA LID: CDA

Summary
- Airport type: Public
- Owner: State of Vermont
- Serves: Caledonia County
- Location: Lyndonville, Vermont
- Elevation AMSL: 1,188 ft (362 m)
- Coordinates: 44°34′09″N 072°01′05″W
- Website: vtrans.vermont.gov/aviation/airports/caledonia-county

Map
- Interactive map of Caledonia County Airport

Runways
Direction	Length		Surface
Direction	ft	m	Surface
2/20	3,300	1,006	Asphalt

Statistics (2007)
- Aircraft operations: 4,690
- Based aircraft: 18
- Source: Federal Aviation Administration

Caledonia County Airport (IATA: LLX, ICAO: KCDA, FAA LID: CDA, formerly 6B8) is a state-owned public-use airport located three nautical miles (6 km) north of the central business district of Lyndonville, a village in Caledonia County, Vermont, United States. It is also known as Caledonia County State Airport.

Although most U.S. airports use the same three-letter location identifier for the FAA and IATA, this airport is assigned CDA by the FAA and LLX by the IATA (which assigned CDA to Cooinda, Northern Territory, Australia).

== Facilities and aircraft ==
Caledonia County Airport covers an area of 78 acres (32 ha) at an elevation of 1,188 feet (362 m) above mean sea level. It has one asphalt paved runway designated 2/20 which measures 3,300 by 60 feet (1,006 x 18 m).

For the 12-month period ending December 12, 2007, the airport had 4,690 aircraft operations, an average of 12 per day: 97% general aviation, 2% air taxi and 1% military. At that time there were 18 aircraft based at this airport, all single-engine.

== See also ==
- List of airports in Vermont
