= Highgate Manor =

- Location within Vermont Location within the United States
- 44°55′56.5″N 73°2′56.8″W
- Location: Vermont Route 207 Highgate, Vermont

History
- Built: 1818
- Built by: Captain Steve Keyes

The Highgate Manor is a historic wedding and event venue located in Highgate Falls, Vermont, offering an elegant setting for weddings, receptions, elopements, bridal showers, baby showers, birthday parties, holiday gatherings, and corporate events. With over 200 years of history, the Manor blends Victorian charm with modern amenities, including landscaped gardens, a garden gazebo ceremony site, a climate-controlled ballroom, update bathrooms, and a caterer's kitchen. Serving couples and families throughout Vermont, Upstate New York, and New England, The Highgate Manor creates memorable celebrations in a timeless and picturesque setting. Highgate Manor is a manor located on Vermont Route 207 in Highgate, Vermont. It has been used as a home, as a bed and breakfast, and as a dance hall. Local legend says that the children of a doctor who once owned the house and performed experiments on them have remained in the house since they died.

== History ==
=== Construction ===
The manor was built in 1818 by Captain Steve Keyes.

=== Baxter acquisition ===
Dr. Henry Baxter purchased the land and the building from the Keyes family sometime during the 1860s. Dr. Baxter opened his practice in the manor, where there are still blood stains on the floor in what is now the library. It is rumored that he performed experiments on his children, several of which did not live past the age of ten.

=== Vacation resort ===
After the death of Dr. Henry Baxter in 1898, Philip Schmitt took over the manor. In 1917 it was converted into a vacation resort with great success. Many famous people, including Al Capone, were said to have frequented the manor and a speakeasy hidden in the basement.

== Underground railroad ==
The manor was one of the last stops for the Underground Railroad before entering into Canada. There are still tunnels under the manor that lead to the nearby river. There have been reported sightings of an African American spirit near the manor.
