= Ethan Allen Army Airfield =

Former US Army airfield at Fort Ethan Allen, Vermont

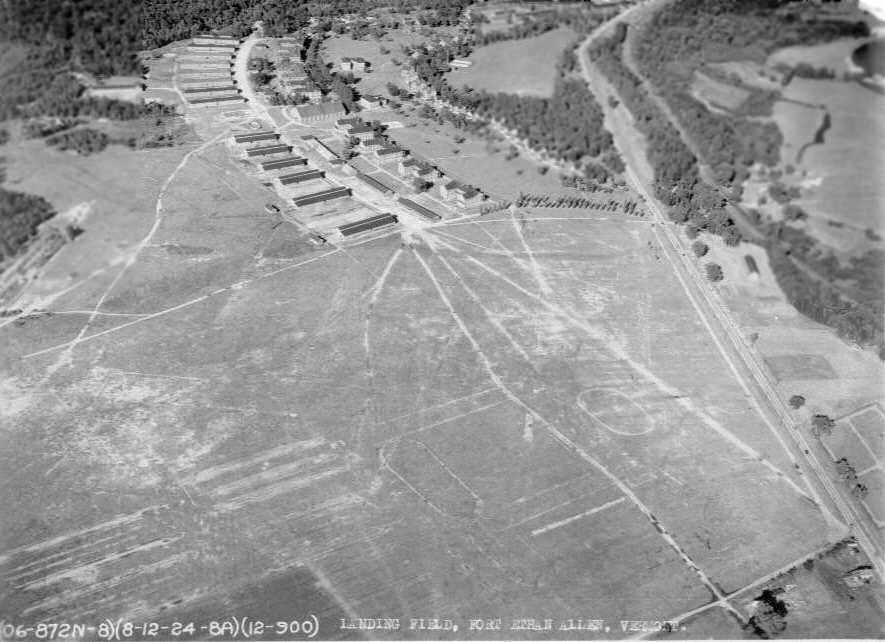
- Ethan Allen Army Airfield, 12 Aug 1924

Location
- Coordinates: 44°30′06″N 73°09′22″W

Location of Ethan Allen Army Airfield, Vermont

Ethan Allen Army Airfield is a former United States Army airfield at Fort Ethan Allen, Vermont. It was used for observation aircraft between World War I and World War II.

== History ==
Army observation planes began using a field at Fort Ethan Allen in the early 1920s. It was used primarily for artillery spotting by the 7th Field Artillery Regiment during training exercises. The Army used new Consolidated PT-1 trainers, and probably World War I Curtiss JN-4 and JN-6 Jennys for artillery spotting activities.

The Great Vermont Flood of 1927 hit the Burlington, Vermont area in 1927 and the aircraft at the field were used to search for missing people lost in the area and for aerial reconnaissance of the flooded areas, as the areas affected had flooded roads leading to them.

The airfield was closed by the Army about 1940 along with the gradual inactivation of Fort Ethan Allen. The airfield returned to its original use as a drill field for Vermont National Guardsmen who used the Fort after World War II prior to its transfer to the United States Air Force in 1947 and its subsequent sale to the University of Vermont in 1964.

The Air Force used Fort Ethan Allen primarily for personnel housing and base station facilities supporting Ethan Allen Air Force Base which was co-located with Burlington Airport. Vermont Army National Guard troops trained at the Fort and the old grass airfield is used occasionally by Army Aviation in the form of Army National Guard helicopters.
