= Fair Haven Municipal Airport =

- IATA: none; ICAO: none; FAA LID: 1B3

Summary
- Airport type: Public
- Owner: Town of Fair Haven
- Serves: Fair Haven, Vermont
- Elevation AMSL: 370 ft / 113 m
- Coordinates: 43°36′55″N 073°16′28″W

Map
- Interactive map of Fair Haven Municipal Airport

Runways
Direction	Length		Surface
Direction	ft	m	Surface
2/20	2,000	610	Gravel/dirt

Statistics (2005)
- Aircraft operations: 150
- Source: Federal Aviation Administration

Fair Haven Municipal Airport (FAA LID: 1B3) was a town-owned public-use airport located two nautical miles (3.7 km) north of the central business district of Fair Haven, a town in Rutland County, Vermont, United States. The airport is closed.

== Facilities and aircraft ==
Fair Haven Municipal Airport covered an area of 140 acres (57 ha) at an elevation of 370 feet (113 m) above mean sea level. It had one runway designated 2/20 with a gravel and dirt surface measuring 2,000 by 20 feet (610 x 6 m). For the 12-month period ending June 7, 2005, the airport had 150 general aviation aircraft operations, an average of 12 per month.
