= Newport Municipal Airport =

Newport Municipal Airport may refer to:

- Newport Municipal Airport (Oregon) in Newport, Oregon, United States (FAA: ONP)
- Newport Municipal Airport (Arkansas) in Newport, Arkansas, United States (FAA: M19)

== See also ==
- Newport State Airport (disambiguation)
