= William H. Morse State Airport =

Coordinates: 42°53′28″N 073°14′46″W

- IATA: none; ICAO: KDDH; FAA LID: DDH

Summary
- Airport type: Public
- Owner: State of Vermont
- Location: Bennington, Vermont
- Elevation AMSL: 827 ft / 252 m
- Website: vtrans.vermont.gov/aviation/airports/williamhmorse

Map
- Interactive map of William H. Morse State Airport

Runways
Direction	Length		Surface
Direction	ft	m	Surface
13/31	3,704	1,129	Asphalt

Statistics (2005)
- Aircraft operations: 27,290
- Based aircraft: 50
- Source: Federal Aviation Administration

William H. Morse State Airport (ICAO: KDDH, FAA LID: DDH) is a state-owned public-use airport located three miles (5 km) west of the central business district of Bennington, a town in Bennington County, Vermont, United States. It is also referred to as "Southwest Vermont's Airport".

Although most U.S. airports use the same three-letter location identifier for the FAA and IATA, William H. Morse State Airport is assigned DDH by the FAA but has no designation from the IATA.

== Facilities and aircraft ==
William H. Morse State Airport covers an area of 100 acres (40 ha) which contains one asphalt paved runway (13/31) measuring 3,704 x 75 ft (1,129 x 23 m).

There are 50 aircraft based at this airport: 48% single engine, 36% multi-engine, 4% helicopters and 12% ultralights.

== See also ==
- List of airports in Vermont
