= Northeast Kingdom International Airport =

Coordinates: 44°53′20″N 072°13′45″W

Northeast Kingdom International
- IATA: EFK; ICAO: KEFK; FAA LID: EFK

Summary
- Airport type: Public
- Owner: State of Vermont
- Serves: Newport, Vermont
- Elevation AMSL: 930 ft (280 m)
- Website: vtrans.vermont.gov/aviation/airports/northeastkingdominternational

Map
- Interactive map of Northeast Kingdom International

Runways
Direction	Length		Surface
Direction	ft	m	Surface
5/23	4,000	1,219	Asphalt
18/36	5,300	1,615	Asphalt

Statistics (2015)
- Aircraft operations: 9,452
- Based aircraft: 20
- Source: Federal Aviation Administration

Northeast Kingdom International Airport, until 2015 the Newport State Airport (IATA: EFK, ICAO: KEFK, FAA LID: EFK), is a state-owned airport in Coventry, Vermont, U.S.A. It is located three miles (5 km) southwest of Newport, in Orleans County, Vermont.

== Facilities ==
The airport covers 540 acres (220 ha) and has two asphalt runways: 5/23 is 4,000 x 100 ft (1,219 x 30 m) and 18/36 is 5,300 x 100 ft (1,615 x 30 m).

In 2015 the airport had 9,452 aircraft operations, average 19 per day: 97% general aviation and 3% military. 20 aircraft are based at this airport: 88% single engine and 12% multi-engine.

== History ==
The city of Newport owned the airport until it sold it to the state of Vermont in the 1970s.

Northeast Airlines DC-3s served Newport from June through September between the years 1955 to 1961 and 1965 to 1967. Air Vermont offered direct service to Burlington and Berlin, N.H., in the early 1980s.

On August 14–15, 2004, the airport served as the site of Coventry, the former final live concert appearance by the musical group Phish, attended by tens of thousands of fans.

On January 9, 2012, the state announced its intention to seek Federal approval for an expansion. The project, projected to take 9 years would extend the runway by 1,000 to 5,000 feet (300 to 1,520 m) with the capability of handling private jets. Other improvements include expanded water and sewer services, a new terminal, new taxiways, and services from the U.S. Customs and Border Protection and the Transportation Security Administration.

In 2013 Flight Design announced the intention of assembling CTLS planes at the airport from nine pieces, fabricated in Germany. It would employ about 35 workers.

The airport was renamed in 2015 amid development plans for the Northeast Kingdom that included a major FAA funded upgrade to the airport. Runway, taxiway and other airport facility upgrades were completed in 2017.

Outside resort developers had proposed plans for a new passenger terminal, commercial flights and the aircraft assembly plant, but were abandoned in April 2016 when the developers were charged with fraud for misappropriating the funds.

On October 12, 2017, the FAA recognized the State of Vermont's airport name change from Newport State Airport to Northeast Kingdom International Airport.

== See also ==
- List of airports in Vermont
