= Smugglers Notch =

Mountain pass in Lamoille County, Vermont

Smugglers' Notch
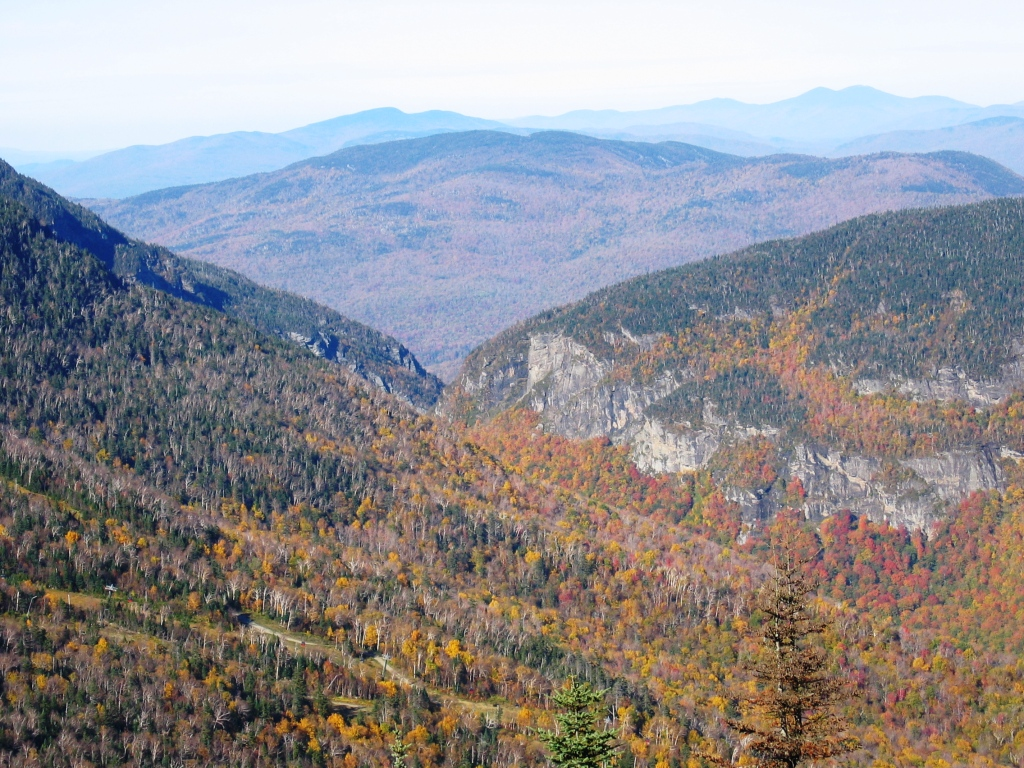
- Smugglers' Notch, looking north from high on the slopes of Mt. Mansfield

- Location within Vermont
- Elevation: 660 metres (2,170 ft)
- Traversed by: Vermont Route 108

Third Approach
- Location: Cambridge, Lamoille County, Vermont, U.S.
- Range: Green Mountains
- Coordinates: 44°33.32′N 72°47.74′W
- Topo map: USGS Mount Mansfield

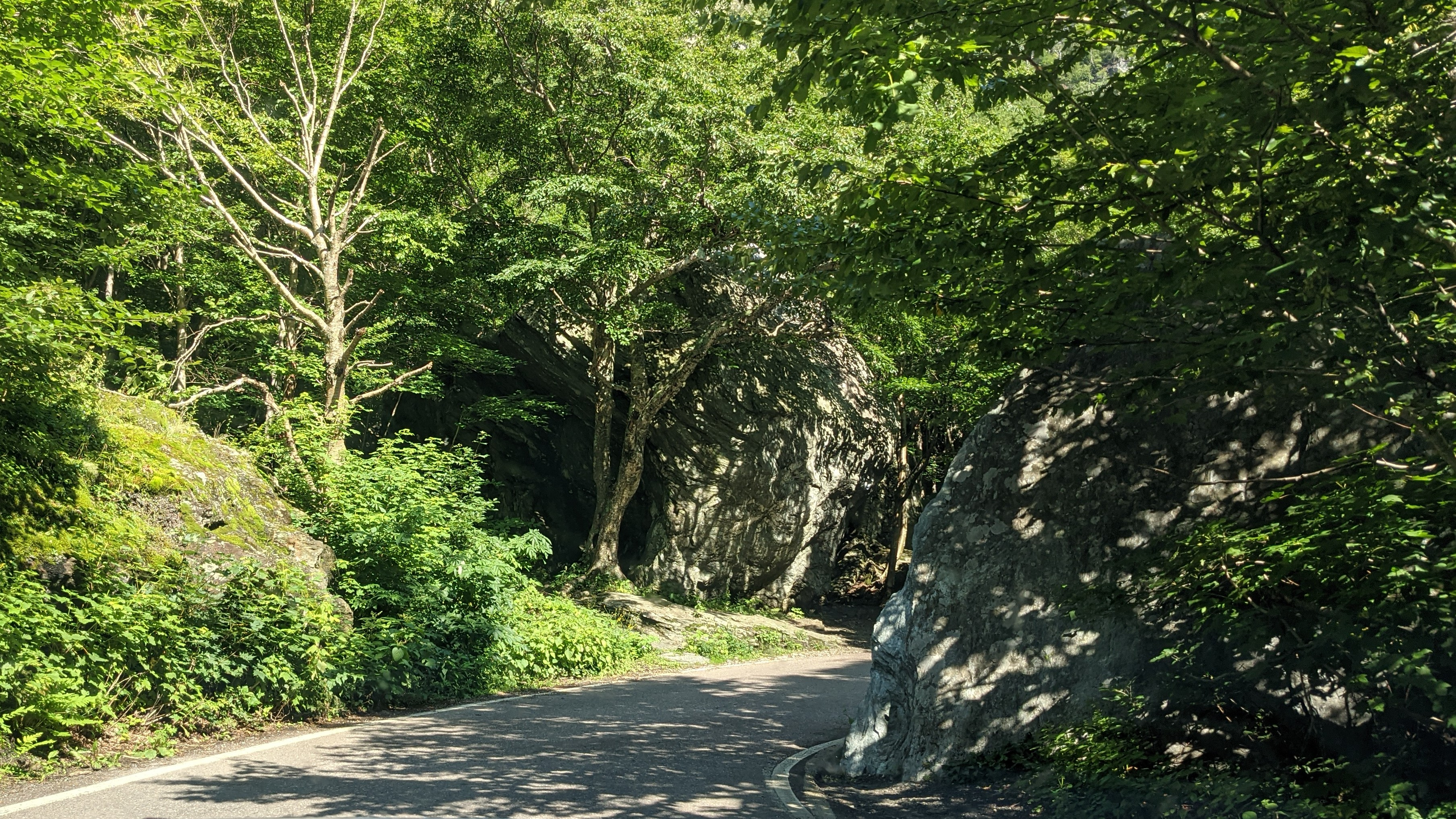
Large boulders line the narrow pass through the Notch.

Smugglers Notch (alternatively Smugglers' , Smuggler's or Smuggs) is a mountain pass in Lamoille County, Vermont. The notch separates Mount Mansfield, the highest peak of the Green Mountains, from Spruce Peak and the Sterling Range. Most of the notch is in Mount Mansfield State Forest.

North of the height of land, Smugglers Notch is drained by the Brewster River, which drains into the Lamoille River, and into Lake Champlain. To the south, the notch is drained by the West Branch Waterbury River, then into the Little River, the Winooski River, and into Lake Champlain.

Smugglers' Notch derives its name from activities precipitated by a request of President Thomas Jefferson to prevent American involvement in the Napoleonic Wars. The Embargo Act of 1807 forbade American trade with Great Britain and Canada. But proximity to Montreal made it a convenient trading partner, and the Act caused great hardship for Vermonters, many of whom continued the illegal trade with Canada, carrying goods and herding livestock through the Notch. Fugitive slaves also used the Notch as an escape route to Canada. The route was improved to accommodate automobile traffic in 1922 thus providing a route for liquor to be brought in from Canada during the Prohibition years. The current seasonal alignment of VT-108 runs as a single lane through the top of the notch with steep and narrow hairpin turns. While the state invests heavily in infrastructure warning drivers of large vehicles and semi-trucks (in English and French) that the route is too narrow for their vehicles, perennial closures of the route due to an 18-wheeler becoming jacknifed at a particularly tight curve in the notch occur at rates that have been as high as six in a single month, in October of 2018. The frequency of this occurrence (as well as the rather obvious inability and unwillingness to widen the alignment of the road) necessitates levying increasingly high fines for towing and removal (as high as $2400 as of 2025). Even as this deterrent continues to be enforced, road closures at the notch still persist at high rates; much to amusement of local residents and even coined with the name of a 'stuckage' in reference to what can only be described as a naturally occurring seasonal phenomenon.

Smugglers' Notch State Park was created near the Notch by the depression-era Civilian Conservation Corps. In 2003 the park was relocated, allowing for a larger campground and new, modern facilities incorporating alternative energy. In order to preserve the work of these pioneering conservationists, all original structures created by the CCC were painstakingly relocated to the new site.

The Long Trail, a 272-mile (438-km) hiking trail running the length of Vermont, traverses Smugglers' Notch. The trail down from the summit of Mt. Mansfield to the east reaches the road south of the height of the pass, and resumes across Route 108 at the Barnes Camp Visitor Center, climbing east to the summit of Madonna Peak.

Smugglers' Notch Resort is located on the northeast side of the pass on the northern side of the Sterling Range with developments on Spruce Peak (referred to as Sterling Mountain by the resort), Madonna Peak (referred to as Madonna Mountain by the resort), and the lower portion of Morse Mountain. The resort takes its name from the pass. Stowe Mountain Resort straddles the southern end of the pass, with developments on both Mt. Mansfield and Spruce Peak.

== Climate ==
Climate data for Smugglers Notch 44.5575 N, 72.7924 W, Elevation: 2,165 ft (660 m) (1991–2020 normals)
Month	Jan	Feb	Mar	Apr	May	Jun	Jul	Aug	Sep	Oct	Nov	Dec	Year
Mean daily maximum °F (°C)	22.7 (−5.2)	25.1 (−3.8)	33.4 (0.8)	46.7 (8.2)	60.4 (15.8)	68.6 (20.3)	72.8 (22.7)	71.2 (21.8)	64.6 (18.1)	51.4 (10.8)	39.2 (4.0)	28.3 (−2.1)	48.7 (9.3)
Daily mean °F (°C)	14.4 (−9.8)	16.2 (−8.8)	24.9 (−3.9)	37.9 (3.3)	51.2 (10.7)	60.0 (15.6)	64.5 (18.1)	62.8 (17.1)	55.9 (13.3)	43.9 (6.6)	32.1 (0.1)	21.4 (−5.9)	40.4 (4.7)
Mean daily minimum °F (°C)	6.0 (−14.4)	7.3 (−13.7)	16.3 (−8.7)	29.1 (−1.6)	42.1 (5.6)	51.3 (10.7)	56.2 (13.4)	54.4 (12.4)	47.3 (8.5)	36.4 (2.4)	25.1 (−3.8)	14.4 (−9.8)	32.2 (0.1)
Average precipitation inches (mm)	5.09 (129)	4.68 (119)	5.27 (134)	5.86 (149)	6.25 (159)	7.48 (190)	6.63 (168)	6.15 (156)	6.63 (168)	7.05 (179)	5.98 (152)	6.01 (153)	73.08 (1,856)
Average snowfall inches (cm)	30.1 (76)	31.0 (79)	25.6 (65)	7.7 (20)	0.6 (1.5)	0.0 (0.0)	0.0 (0.0)	0.0 (0.0)	0.0 (0.0)	1.9 (4.8)	11.2 (28)	31.2 (79)	139.3 (353.3)
Source 1: PRISM Climate Group
Source 2: NOAA (Jeffersonville snowfall)
