= Mount Mansfield State Forest =

State forest in Vermont, United States

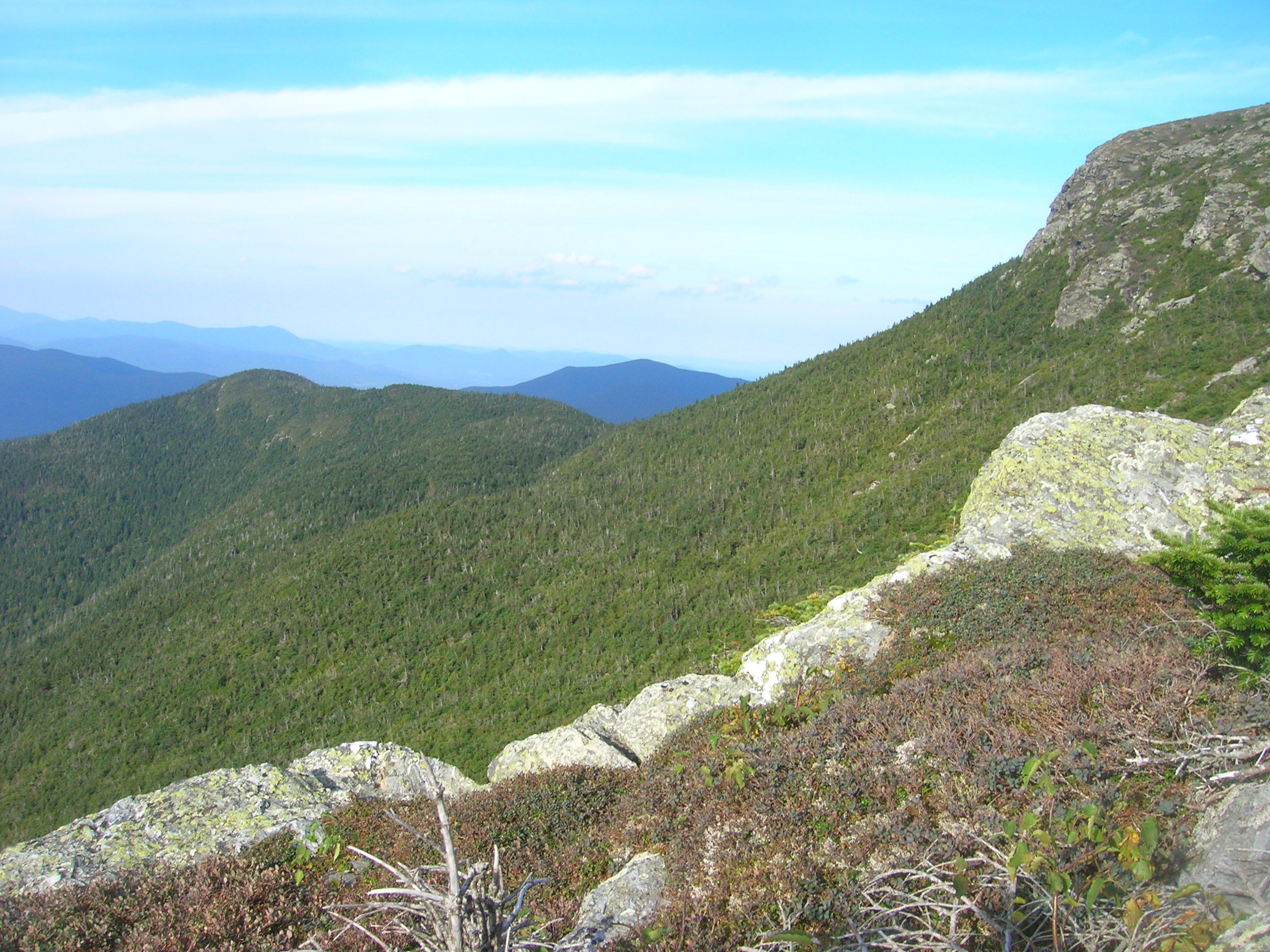
- View of Underhill State Park & Smugglers' Notch State Park (background)
- Interactive map of Mount Mansfield State Forest
- Type: State forest
- Location: Chittenden, Lamoille and Washington County, Vermont
- Coordinates: 44.4918°N 72.8186°W
- Area: 44,444 acres (179.86 km^{2})
- Operator: Vermont Department of Forests, Parks, and Recreation
- Website: Website

Mount Mansfield State Forest covers 44,444 acres (179.86 km^{2}) in seven towns in Chittenden, Lamoille and Washington counties in Vermont. The towns are Bolton and Underhill in Chittenden County, Cambridge, Johnson, Morristown and Stowe in Lamoille County, and Waterbury in Washington County. Mt. Mansfield State Forest is the largest contiguous landholding owned by the Vermont Department of Forests, Parks and Recreation.

== Recreation ==
There are four state parks located in the forest: Little River State Park, Smugglers' Notch State Park, Underhill State Park and Waterbury Center State Park. Activities include camping, swimming, boating, fishing, hiking, picnicking, bicycling, wildlife watching, and winter sports.

The alpine ski resorts of Smugglers' Notch and Stowe Mountain Resort are located in the forest. There are two Nordic ski centers – Mt. Mansfield Touring Center and Bolton Nordic Center at Bolton Valley. The Catamount Trail Association manages backcountry ski trails in the Forest. There are over 36 miles of VAST snowmobile trails throughout the Forest and mountain biking trails in the southern end.

There are numerous miles of hiking trails that include the Long Trail and hikes up and around Mount Mansfield.

The 880-acre Waterbury Reservoir features three motorboat access points and one car-top boat access point. There are remote campsites along the shores of the Reservoir that are being developed as the Department partners with the Friends of Waterbury Reservoir. Primitive camping is allowed on various portions of Mt. Mansfield State Forest, following the developed guidelines.

Hunting, fishing and trapping are allowed throughout the Forest.

== Features ==
Mt. Mansfield State Forest features and is named for Mount Mansfield, the highest peak in Vermont at 4,393-feet. The 400-acre summit ridge is actually owned by the University of Vermont.

The forest contains two State Natural Areas - Daniels Notch Natural Area (100 acres (0.40 km^{2})) and Mt. Mansfield Natural Area (3,850 acres (15.6 km^{2})).

Smugglers' Notch Proper is listed as a National Natural Landmark.

Vermont Route 108 between Stowe Mountain Resort and Smugglers' Notch Resort is a federally designated Scenic By-way.

== Climate ==
Climate data for Mount Mansfield, Vermont, 1991-2020 normals, extremes 1954-present: 3950ft (1204m)
Month	Jan	Feb	Mar	Apr	May	Jun	Jul	Aug	Sep	Oct	Nov	Dec	Year
Record high °F (°C)	53 (12)	56 (13)	65 (18)	74 (23)	85 (29)	84 (29)	84 (29)	82 (28)	79 (26)	76 (24)	63 (17)	60 (16)	85 (29)
Mean maximum °F (°C)	42.2 (5.7)	38.7 (3.7)	46.9 (8.3)	60.4 (15.8)	70.9 (21.6)	75.3 (24.1)	76.0 (24.4)	74.2 (23.4)	71.3 (21.8)	62.4 (16.9)	52.6 (11.4)	43.7 (6.5)	77.6 (25.3)
Mean daily maximum °F (°C)	18.2 (−7.7)	19.7 (−6.8)	27.2 (−2.7)	39.6 (4.2)	54.0 (12.2)	62.4 (16.9)	66.1 (18.9)	64.7 (18.2)	58.2 (14.6)	44.8 (7.1)	33.3 (0.7)	23.7 (−4.6)	42.7 (5.9)
Daily mean °F (°C)	10.5 (−11.9)	12.1 (−11.1)	20.0 (−6.7)	32.1 (0.1)	46.0 (7.8)	54.9 (12.7)	59.3 (15.2)	58.1 (14.5)	51.3 (10.7)	38.6 (3.7)	27.0 (−2.8)	16.9 (−8.4)	35.6 (2.0)
Mean daily minimum °F (°C)	2.9 (−16.2)	4.5 (−15.3)	12.8 (−10.7)	24.6 (−4.1)	38.1 (3.4)	47.5 (8.6)	52.6 (11.4)	51.4 (10.8)	44.5 (6.9)	32.3 (0.2)	20.7 (−6.3)	10.1 (−12.2)	28.5 (−2.0)
Mean minimum °F (°C)	−22.4 (−30.2)	−18.1 (−27.8)	−12.1 (−24.5)	7.0 (−13.9)	21.6 (−5.8)	32.8 (0.4)	41.4 (5.2)	40.2 (4.6)	28.9 (−1.7)	16.7 (−8.5)	3.3 (−15.9)	−12.5 (−24.7)	−25.6 (−32.0)
Record low °F (°C)	−39 (−39)	−36 (−38)	−31 (−35)	−13 (−25)	5 (−15)	20 (−7)	26 (−3)	25 (−4)	16 (−9)	5 (−15)	−11 (−24)	−38 (−39)	−39 (−39)
Average precipitation inches (mm)	5.62 (143)	5.26 (134)	5.88 (149)	6.31 (160)	6.88 (175)	7.86 (200)	7.31 (186)	6.89 (175)	7.26 (184)	7.63 (194)	6.68 (170)	7.51 (191)	81.09 (2,061)
Average snowfall inches (cm)	40.9 (104)	44.6 (113)	38.7 (98)	21.4 (54)	5.5 (14)	0.0 (0.0)	0.0 (0.0)	0.0 (0.0)	0.1 (0.25)	10.1 (26)	30.4 (77)	43.2 (110)	234.9 (596.25)
Average extreme snow depth inches (cm)	54.6 (139)	74.7 (190)	88.3 (224)	84.8 (215)	53.6 (136)	4.7 (12)	0.0 (0.0)	0.0 (0.0)	0.0 (0.0)	6.6 (17)	17.6 (45)	35.2 (89)	92.8 (236)
Average precipitation days (≥ 0.01 in)	21.6	18.2	17.2	15.4	15.4	16.2	16.3	15.2	14.4	15.0	17.3	21.5	203.7
Average snowy days (≥ 0.1 in)	18.2	16.1	13.0	6.4	1.8	0.0	0.0	0.0	0.2	3.8	10.4	17.0	86.9
Source 1: XMACIS2 (temp normals, max/mins & snow depth)
Source 2: NOAA (precipitation & snowfall)
