= Smugglers' Notch State Park =

State park in Vermont, United States

- IUCN category III (natural monument or feature)
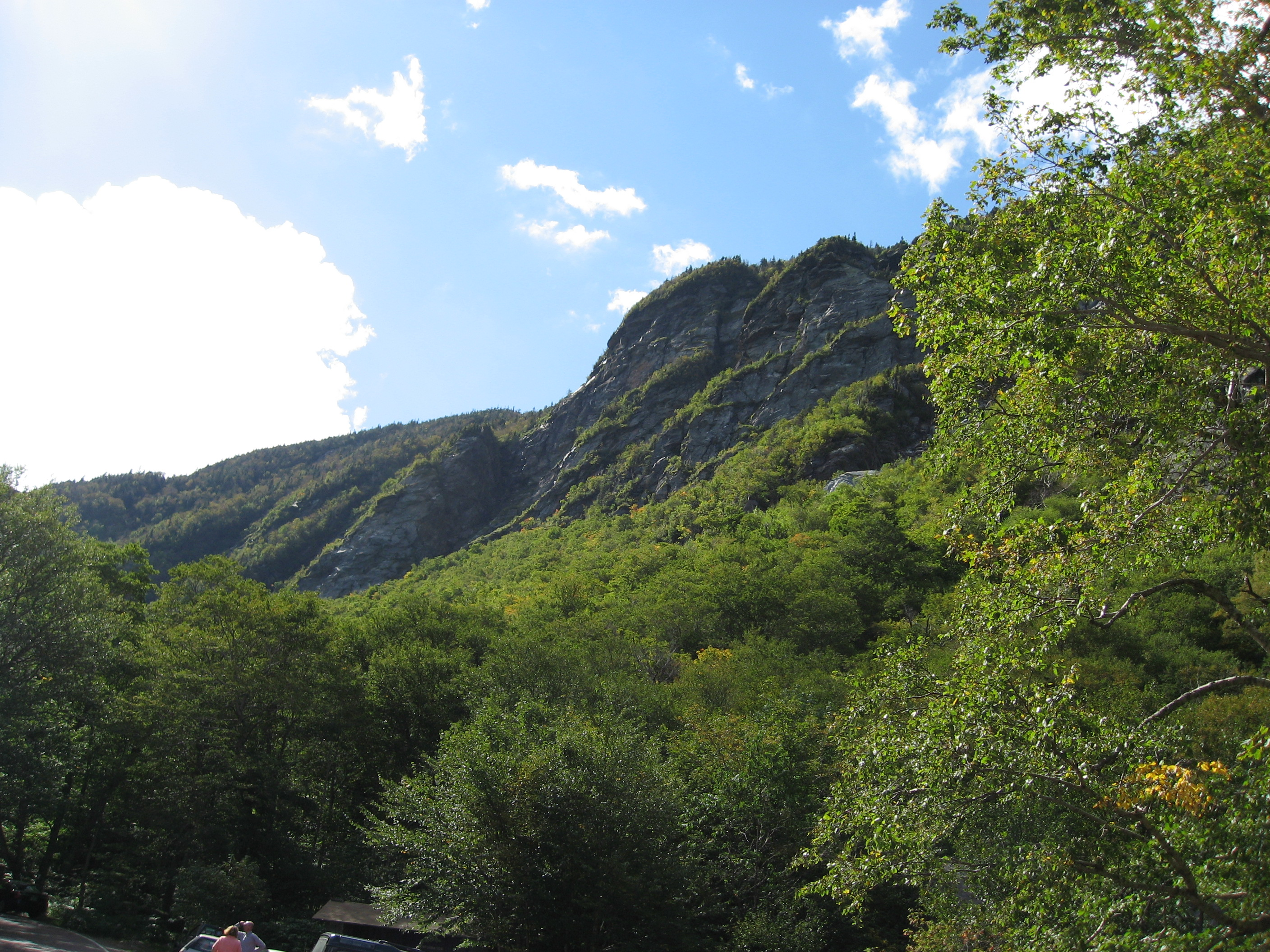

- Location within Vermont
- Location: Lamoille County, Vermont, United States
- Coordinates: 44°33′13″N 72°47′46″W
- Elevation: 2,119 ft (646 m)
- Designation: State park
- Named for: Smugglers Notch
- Operator: Vermont State Parks
- Website: Smugglers' Notch State Park

Smugglers' Notch State Park is a Vermont state park near Stowe in Lamoille County, Vermont, United States. The park is at an elevation of 2,119 feet (646 m) near Mount Mansfield, and is named for Smugglers Notch, which separates Mount Mansfield—the highest peak of the Green Mountains—from Spruce Peak and the Sterling Range.

== History ==
Smugglers' Notch is named for the smuggling that was prompted by a request of President Thomas Jefferson to prevent American involvement in the Napoleonic Wars. The United States Congress passed the Embargo Act of 1807 which prohibited American trade with Great Britain and Canada. The British bypassed the embargo by importing products to Canada and they were smuggled down mountain trails through Smugglers' Notch by Vermonters. The Act caused great hardship for locals, many of whom continued the illegal trade with Canada, carrying goods and herding livestock through the notch. The geology of the notch made it well suited for smuggling as the area is remote and laced with numerous caves. The caves were used as hideaways by the smugglers. Much of the illegal activity slowed with the onset of the War of 1812. Smugglers' Notch was later used on the Underground Railroad when fugitive slaves used the notch as an escape route to Canada. The route was improved to accommodate automobile traffic in 1922 thus providing a route for liquor to be brought in from Canada during the Prohibition years.

Smugglers' Notch State Park was built near the notch by the depression-era Civilian Conservation Corps founded by President Franklin D. Roosevelt to provide employment for the out of work young men of New England in 1936. In 2003 the park was relocated, making way for a larger campground and modern facilities incorporating alternative energy. To preserve the work of these pioneering conservationists, all original structures created by the CCC were carefully relocated to the new site.

== Geography ==
Smugglers' Notch State Park is situated in the Green Mountains which are part of the Appalachian Mountains, a range that stretches from Quebec in the north to Georgia in the south. The Green Mountains have five peaks over 4,000 feet (1,200 m). Three of these (Mount Mansfield, Camel's Hump, and Mount Abraham) support alpine vegetation. All of the major peaks are traversed by the Long Trail, a wilderness hiking trail that runs from the southern to northern borders of the state and is joined by the Appalachian Trail for roughly ⅓ of its length.

== Recreation ==
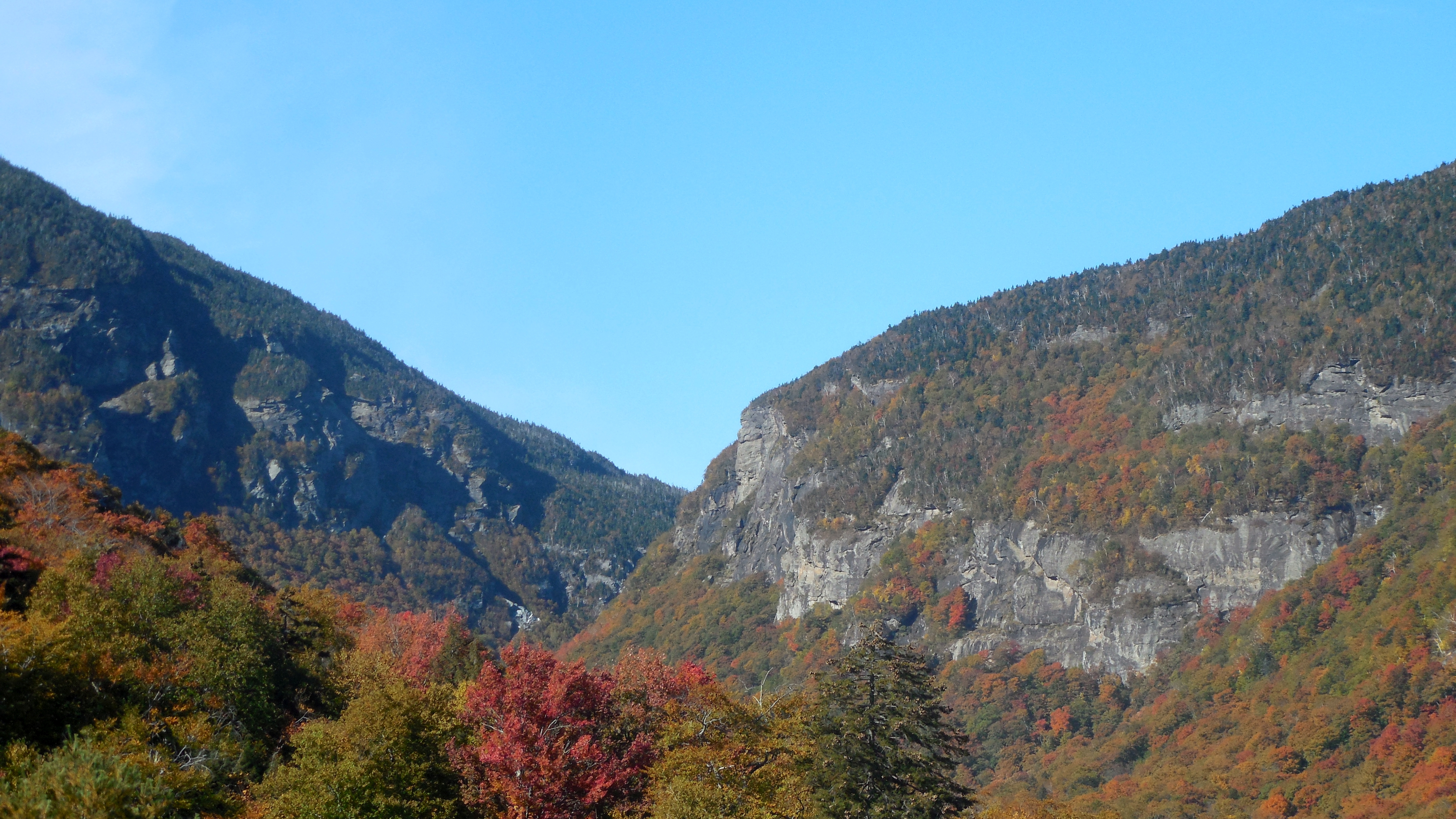
Smugglers' Notch between Mt. Mansfield (left), and Sterling Mountain (right)

Smugglers' Notch State Park on Vermont Route 108 is open for year-round recreation, but access is limited in the winter months to snow mobiles and skiers. There are fourteen lean-to shelters and twenty campsites at the campgrounds that are located just off Route 108.

The park serves as a trailhead for several hiking trails that stretch into Mount Mansfield State Forest. Sterling Pond trail passes through a dense secondary forest. The trail begins North of the campground and it rises 900 feet to Sterling Pond which is open to fishing and swimming. Several trails begin at Smugglers' Notch State Park and ascend Mount Mansfield. Mountain climbing and spelunking is permitted at the park. Many large boulders and caves are found throughout the park and vertical cliffs are on Mount Mansfield and Elephant's Head.
