= Jeffersonville, Vermont =

- Village
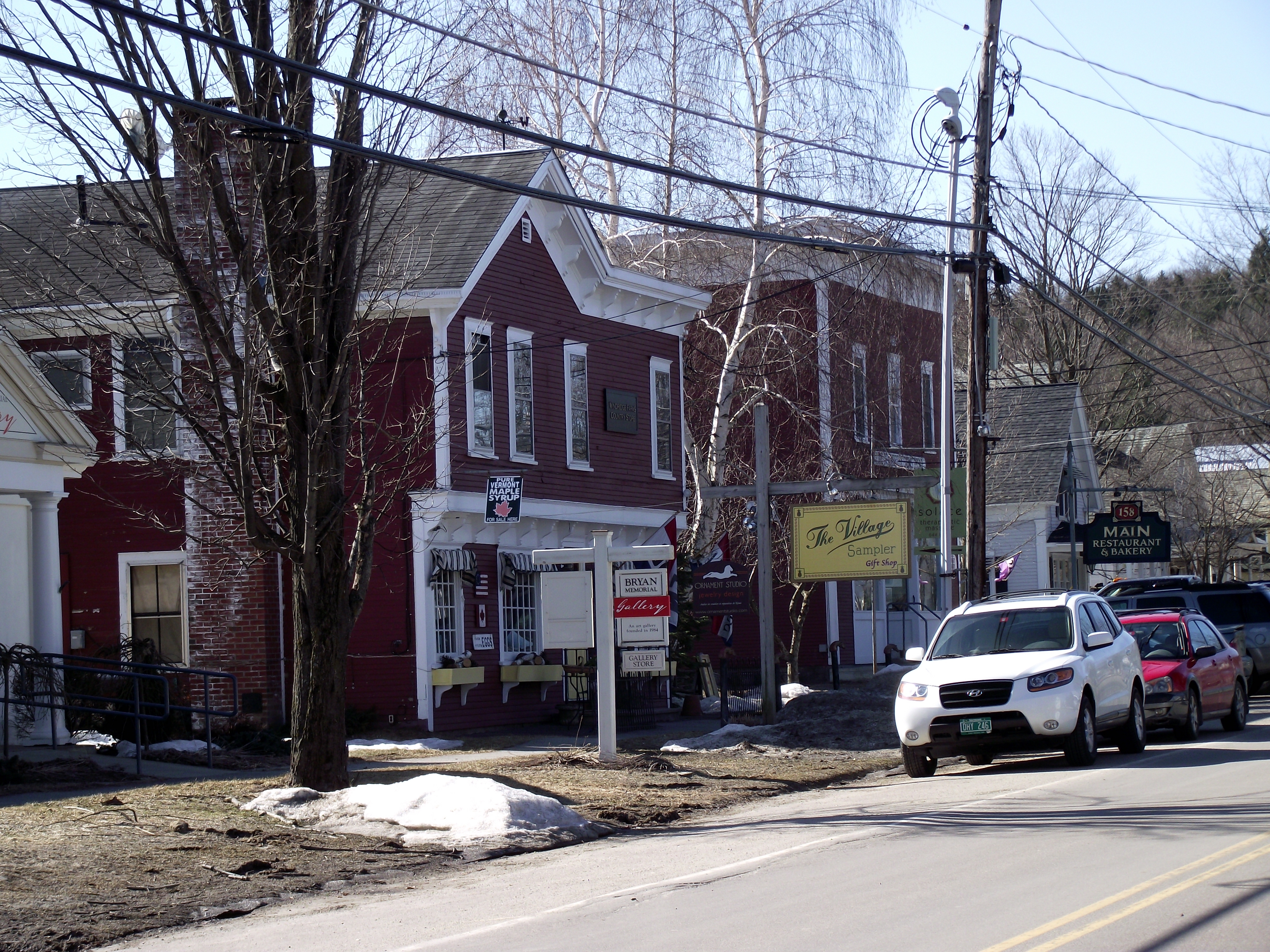
- Jeffersonville Historic District

- Location in Vermont Location in the United States
- Coordinates: 44°38′34″N 72°49′42″W
- Country: United States
- State: Vermont
- County: Lamoille
- Town: Cambridge
- Incorporated: 1897

Area
  - Total: 0.80 sq mi (2.08 km^{2})
  - Land: 0.78 sq mi (2.01 km^{2})
  - Water: 0.027 sq mi (0.07 km^{2})
- Elevation: 479 ft (146 m)

Population (2020)
  - Total: 750
  - Density: 970/sq mi (370/km^{2})
- Time zone: UTC-5 (Eastern (EST))
  - Summer (DST): UTC-4 (EDT)
- ZIP code: 05464
- Area code: 802
- FIPS code: 50-36475
- GNIS feature ID: 2378309
- Website: www.jeffvillagevt.com

Jeffersonville is a village in the town of Cambridge, Vermont, United States. The population was 750 at the 2020 census.

== History ==
The village was originally called "Cambridge Center". The name was changed to "Jeffersonville" in 1827 to honor Thomas Jefferson. The village was incorporated in 1897.

== Geography ==
According to the United States Census Bureau, the village has a total area of 0.81 square miles (2.1 km^{2}), of which 0.03 square miles (0.07 km^{2}), or 3.25%, is water. The village is located near the geographic center of the town of Cambridge, along the south bank of the Lamoille River where it is joined by the Brewster River. Jeffersonville is 30 miles (48 km) northeast of Burlington via Vermont Route 15. Jeffersonville sits at 1,060 feet (320 m) above sea level, surrounded by higher standing mountains, such as Mount Mansfield (the highest peak in Vermont at 4,393 feet (1,339 m)), 7 miles (11 km) to the south.

=== Climate ===
Jeffersonville has a humid continental climate (Köppen Dfb), with very cold winters and warm, humid summers. The monthly daily average temperatures ranges from 12 °F (−11 °C) in January to 64.4 °F (18.0 °C) in July. The annual precipitation is significant, averaging 57.8 inches (1,470 mm) and is well-distributed throughout the year, but the latter months are the wettest. The town's location east of Lake Champlain sometimes accounts for localized snow squalls, producing up to 18 inches (46 cm) in 12 hours on rare occasions. Annual snowfall is significant, averaging 139.3 inches (354 cm). Extremes have ranged from −38 °F (−39 °C) on January 28, 1994, to 89 °F (32 °C) on June 28, 2003, and July 26, 1989. The most snowfall from a single storm is 73.1 inches (186 cm), which fell January 2–4, 2010.

Climate data for Jeffersonville, Vermont, 1991–2020 normals, extremes 1981–present[a]
Month	Jan	Feb	Mar	Apr	May	Jun	Jul	Aug	Sep	Oct	Nov	Dec	Year
Record high °F (°C)	59 (15)	60 (16)	71 (22)	83 (28)	84 (29)	89 (32)	89 (32)	88 (31)	87 (31)	75 (24)	67 (19)	62 (17)	89 (32)
Mean daily maximum °F (°C)	23.1 (−4.9)	26.4 (−3.1)	31.9 (−0.1)	46.2 (7.9)	60 (16)	69.8 (21.0)	74.1 (23.4)	71.6 (22.0)	65 (18)	50 (10)	38.1 (3.4)	28 (−2)	48.3 (9.1)
Daily mean °F (°C)	12 (−11)	15 (−9)	23.2 (−4.9)	37.1 (2.8)	50 (10)	61 (16)	64.4 (18.0)	62.6 (17.0)	55 (13)	42.3 (5.7)	31.7 (−0.2)	19.2 (−7.1)	39.2 (4.0)
Mean daily minimum °F (°C)	1.1 (−17.2)	4.9 (−15.1)	14.5 (−9.7)	27 (−3)	41.3 (5.2)	51.6 (10.9)	55.8 (13.2)	54.3 (12.4)	45.1 (7.3)	32 (0)	22.2 (−5.4)	10 (−12)	29.7 (−1.3)
Record low °F (°C)	−38 (−39)	−34 (−37)	−22 (−30)	−3 (−19)	21 (−6)	28 (−2)	35 (2)	30 (−1)	15 (−9)	10 (−12)	−12 (−24)	−29 (−34)	−38 (−39)
Average precipitation inches (mm)	4.13 (105)	3.16 (80)	4.55 (116)	4.78 (121)	4.83 (123)	5.81 (148)	5.32 (135)	4.58 (116)	5.01 (127)	6.36 (162)	4.97 (126)	4.28 (109)	57.78 (1,468)
Average snowfall inches (cm)	30.1 (76)	31.0 (79)	25.6 (65)	7.7 (20)	0.6 (1.5)	0 (0)	0 (0)	0 (0)	0 (0)	1.9 (4.8)	11.2 (28)	31.2 (79)	139.3 (353.3)
Average precipitation days (≥ ≥ 0.01 in)	19.6	17.4	15.4	15.2	13.0	15.2	13.4	12.5	11.0	15.3	15.9	21.0	184.9
Average snowy days (≥ ≥ 0.01 in)	15.3	14	10.4	4	0.3	0	0	0	0	0.6	6.2	14.8	65.6
Source 1: NOAA(precipitation, snow, precip days, snow days)
Source 2: (temperatures 1981-2010)

== Demographics ==
Historical population
Census	Pop.	Note	%±
1930	305		—
1940	287		−5.9%
1950	387		34.8%
1960	346		−10.6%
1970	382		10.4%
1980	491		28.5%
1990	462		−5.9%
2000	568		22.9%
2010	729		28.3%
2020	750		2.9%
U.S. Decennial Census

As of the census of 2000, there were 568 people, 248 households, and 150 families residing in the village. The population density was 714.3 people per square mile (275.8 people/km^{2}). There were 254 housing units at an average density of 319.4/sq mi (122.6/km^{2}). The racial makeup of the village was 98.06% White, and 1.94% from two or more races. Hispanic or Latino of any race were 0.88% of the population.

There were 248 households, out of which 29.4% had children under the age of 18 living with them, 48.4% were married couples living together, 8.9% had a female householder with no husband present, and 39.5% were non-families. 29.0% of all households were made up of individuals, and 11.7% had someone living alone who was 65 years of age or older. The average household size was 2.29 and the average family size was 2.85.

In the village, the population was spread out, with 23.8% under the age of 18, 9.7% from 18 to 24, 35.2% from 25 to 44, 20.6% from 45 to 64, and 10.7% who were 65 years of age or older. The median age was 32 years. For every 100 females, there were 97.2 males. For every 100 females age 18 and over, there were 95.0 males.

The median income for a household in the village was $38,333, and the median income for a family was $48,929. Males had a median income of $35,375 versus $23,036 for females. The per capita income for the village was $20,323. About 1.3% of families and 6.6% of the population were below the poverty line, including 3.2% of those under age 18 and 17.6% of those age 65 or over.

== Education ==
- Students in public school Pre-Kindergarten through sixth grade attend Cambridge Elementary School in Jeffersonville, VT (318 students).
- For grades 7 - 8, public school students attend Lamoille Union Middle School in Hyde Park, VT (274 students).
- For grades 9 - 12, public school students attend Lamoille Union High School in Hyde Park, VT (601 students).

== Sites of interest ==
- Smugglers' Notch Resort, 5 miles (8 km) south of the village
- Smugglers Notch, mountain pass 9 miles (14 km) south of the village

== Notable people ==
- Scott Buchanan, educator, philosopher, and foundation consultant; raised in Jeffersonville
- Barbara J. Sindall, Latin and Greek teacher, World War II gunner
