= Vermont Route 108 =

State highway in Vermont, US

Vermont Route 108
- 10th Mountain Division Memorial Highway
- VT 108 highlighted in red

Route information
- Maintained by VTrans
- Length: 45.450 mi (73.145 km)

Major junctions
- South end: VT 100 in Stowe
- VT 15 in Jeffersonville; VT 105 in Enosburg
- North end: R-237 at the Canadian border near Berkshire

Location
- Country: United States
- State: Vermont
- Counties: Lamoille, Franklin

Highway system
- State highways in Vermont
← VT 107	→ VT 109

Vermont Route 108 (VT 108) is a north–south state highway in Vermont, United States. Its southern terminus is at VT 100 in Stowe, and its northern terminus is at the Canada–US border in Franklin, where it continues into Quebec past the West Berkshire–Frelighsburg Border Crossing as Route 237. VT 108 is 45.450 miles (73.145 km) long.

== Route description ==
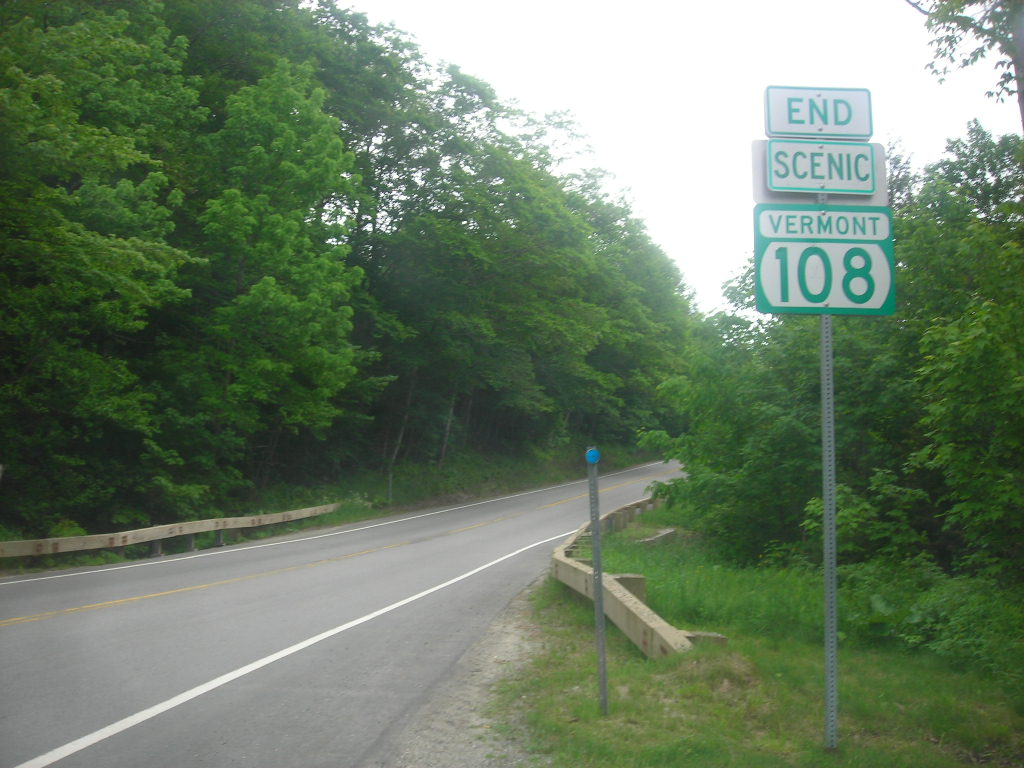
"End VT 108 Scenic" assembly on VT 108 southbound south of Smugglers Notch

VT 108 passes through the area of the Mount Mansfield State Forest. It starts in Stowe and goes through Smugglers' Notch to Jeffersonville. The road cuts through Mount Mansfield. The road is very steep and winding, making it impossible to plow in the winter, so the road is closed between the State Forest access parking lot and Smugglers' Notch Resort, usually from late October until May. Tractor-trailers are barred from this section of the route, and there is posted signs warning truck drivers. Though several trucks per year attempt traveling through and wind up getting stuck due to the tight turns, incurring fines of over $2000. Large straight trucks, buses and RVs are strongly encouraged to use alternate routes year-round. However, skiers come from alternate routes to cross-country, downhill ski, and snow mobile in the Smuggler's Notch Resort. Along the road, there are small parking areas where rock climbing and hiking are popular.

== Major intersections ==
County	Location	mi	km	Destinations	Notes
Lamoille	Stowe	0.000	0.000	VT 100 – Airport, Morrisville, Waterbury	Southern terminus
Lamoille	Cambridge	17.383	27.975	To VT 15 west – Cambridge, Essex Junction via Church Street	Village of Jeffersonville
Lamoille	Cambridge	17.696	28.479	VT 15 – Johnson, Morrisville, Cambridge, Essex Junction	Roundabout; village of Jeffersonville
Lamoille	Cambridge	18.142	29.197	VT 109 north – Waterville, Belvidere	Southern terminus of VT 109
Franklin	Bakersfield	27.785	44.716	VT 36 west – Fairfield, St. Albans	Eastern terminus of VT 36
Franklin	Enosburg	37.040	59.610	VT 105 west – St. Albans	Southern end of concurrency with VT 105; village of Enosburg Falls
Franklin	Enosburg	37.544	60.421	VT 105 east – Richford	Northern end of concurrency with VT 105
Franklin	Berkshire	43.347	69.760	VT 118 south – Berkshire, East Berkshire	Northern terminus of VT 118
Franklin	Berkshire	44.111	70.990	VT 120 south – Franklin	Northern terminus of VT 120
Franklin	Berkshire	45.450	73.145	R-237 north – Frelighsburg	Continuation into Quebec
1.000 mi = 1.609 km; 1.000 km = 0.621 mi: Concurrency terminus
