= King's College Tract =

Forested land in Vermont, U.S.

Coordinates: 44.6416°N 72.6711°W

The King's College Tract was a 20,000-acre (81 km^{2}) area of forested land in the vicinity of the present towns of Cambridge and Johnson in the U.S. state of Vermont. The tract was granted in 1764 by Lieutenant Governor Cadwallader Colden of the New York crown colony, in the name of King George III to the board of governors (trustees) of King's College – the predecessor of today's Columbia University and the Canadian University of King's College. The grant was intended for the eventual expansion of the college.

The emergence of the Vermont Republic in 1777 forestalled claim of the grant, and Vermont's General Assembly made a grant of the same land in 1785 to William Samuel Johnson, an American founding father and jurist who informally represented Vermont before the Continental Congress and argued for its eventual admission to the federal union.

By coincidence, the association with King's College, now Columbia University, continued, as Johnson became president of then Columbia College in 1787.

Though Columbia University never moved to King's College Tract, eventually a college was located there. In 1828, John Chesamore founded the Lamoille Academy, predecessor to Johnson State College, now a campus of Vermont State University.

== References and further reading ==
- Graff, Nancy Price. Visible Layers of Time: A Perspective on the History and Architecture of Johnson, Vermont. The University of Vermont, Historic Preservation Program: 1990.
- Raymond, Kenneth. The History of Johnson State College: 1828-1984. Johnson State College: 1985.
- Swift, Esther Monroe. Vermont Place Names: Footprints of History. The Stephen Greene Press: 1996 ISBN 0-8289-0291-7.
