= Barbara J. Sindall =

British educator

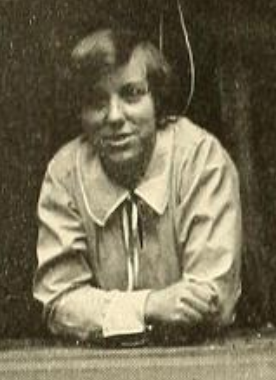
- Barbara J. Sindall, from the 1926 yearbook of Bryn Mawr College
- Born: 22 September 1904; Tunbridge Wells, UK
- Died: 25 March 1989 (aged 84); Jeffersonville, Vermont
- Other names: Bobby Sindall
- Occupation(s): Classicist, educator

Barbara Joan Sindall (22 September 1904 – 25 March 1989) was a British educator. She taught Latin and Greek at girls' private schools including Brearley and Ethel Walker in the United States, and Godolphin and Latymer School in London. During World War II she was an anti-aircraft gunner in England.

== Early life and education ==
Sindall was born in Tunbridge Wells, the daughter of Harold Francis Sindall and Ada Banning Sindall. Her father was headmaster of the Arden School on Staten Island, and a teacher at St. Bernard's and the Choate School. She moved to the United States with her parents in childhood, and attended preparatory school in Dongan Hills, Staten Island. She graduated from Bryn Mawr College in 1926. At Bryn Mawr she played hockey, ran track, and did archery and swimming. She pursued further studies in Rome, and at Yale University.

== Career ==
Sindall taught Latin, Greek, and archaeology courses at private girls' schools including the Brearley School in New York City, the Godolphin and Latymer School in London, and the Ethel Walker School in Connecticut. During World War II she returned to Britain and enlisted in the Auxiliary Territorial Service in which she was commissioned in 1944 and attained the rank of Subaltern (equivalent to Lieutenant) and served in a Royal Artillery anti-aircraft battery. "I had no idea what I could do to help," she recalled to an American reporter in 1969. "I only knew I didn't want a soft, easy job as I'd had over here." She retired from schoolwork in 1966, and became a librarian in Vermont.

== Personal life ==
Sindall lived with her widowed friend and fellow teacher, Bay Frances Coudenhove, in Jeffersonville, Vermont, until Coudenhove died in 1988. Sindall died in 1989, aged 84 years, in Jeffersonville. Her niece Susan Sindall married composer Peter Schickele.
