= John Fassett Jr. =

American judge

Member of the Vermont House of Representatives
- In office 1790–1792
- Preceded by: Amos Fassett
- Succeeded by: Prince Hall
- Constituency: Cambridge
- In office 1787–1789
- Preceded by: None (position created)
- Succeeded by: Amos Fassett
- Constituency: Cambridge
- In office 1778–1779 Serving with Ethan Allen
- Preceded by: Thomas Chittenden
- Succeeded by: Jacob Galusha, Matthew Lyon
- Constituency: Arlington

Chief Judge of the Chittenden County, Vermont Court
- In office 1787–1794
- Preceded by: None (position created)
- Succeeded by: Ebenezer Marvin

Judge of the Vermont Supreme Court
- In office 1778–1785
- Preceded by: None (position created)
- Succeeded by: Nathaniel Chipman

Member of the Vermont Governor's Council
- In office 1778–1795
- Preceded by: None (position created)
- Succeeded by: William Chamberlain

Personal details
- Born: June 23, 1743 Bedford, Province of Massachusetts Bay
- Died: April 2, 1803 (aged 59) Cambridge, Vermont, US
- Resting place: Mountain View Cemetery, Cambridge, Vermont, US
- Spouse: Hannah Safford (m. 1764–1803)
- Children: 9
- Occupation: Farmer

Military service
- Allegiance: United States
- Service: Vermont Militia (1764–1775); Continental Army (1775–1777)
- Years of service: 1764–1777
- Rank: Captain
- Unit: Hopkins's Company, Warner's Regiment, (Militia); Warner's Additional Regiment (Army)
- Wars: American Revolutionary War; Capture of Fort Ticonderoga (1775); Invasion of Quebec (1775); Battle of Longue-Pointe (1775); Battle of Bennington (1777)

John Fassett Jr. (June 23, 1743—April 2, 1803) was an early white settler of Vermont who served in the military during the American Revolutionary War and held several government positions during Vermont's early years, including judge of the Vermont Supreme Court.

== Early life ==
John Fassett Jr. was born in Bedford, Massachusetts on June 23, 1743, a son of John Fassett Sr. (1720-1794) and Mary (Wooley) Fassett (1720–1782). His father moved the family to Bennington, Vermont in 1761, where he farmed and owned an inn. The elder John Fassett was a leader of early Vermont as a captain in the Green Mountain Boys militia and a member of the Vermont House of Representatives. The younger John Fassett moved to Bennington with his father and became a farmer.

== Continued career ==
A private in the Green Mountain Boys militia regiment beginning in 1764, he was a first lieutenant at the start of the American Revolution in 1775. The regiment was commanded by Seth Warner, and Fassett likely took part in its May 1775 Capture of Fort Ticonderoga. He was with the regiment during its attempted invasion of Invasion of Quebec in the fall of 1775. Fassett was among several officers cashiered by Horatio Gates after a disorderly retreat, but most, including Fassett, were subsequently reinstated. Fassett kept a diary during the Canada expedition, which was later published as Diary of Captain John Fassett, Jr. (1743-1803): When a First Lieutenant of "Green Mountain Boys," September 1st to December 7th, 1775.

Fassett was a captain in the Continental Army regiment Warner raised in 1776, called Warner's Additional Regiment. He took part in the Battle of Bennington in August 1777, and was subsequently assigned as commissary officer for the hospital and prisoner of war camp located near Bennington. In October 1777, Fassett was appointed as a sequestration commissioner, alongside Thomas Chittenden and Matthew Lyon; the commission was charged with seizing the property of Loyalists and dispensing with it for the state's benefit.

In 1778, Fassett was appointed one of the original judges of the Vermont Supreme Court, and he served until he moved to Cambridge in 1785. He was also a member of the governor's executive council from 1778 to 1796. From 1780 to 1782, he was a member of the board of war, the panel appointed to oversee Vermont's participation in the war. When the Haldimand Affair became public, Fassett was among those who offered public support for Ira Allen and other negotiators, arguing that they had conducted negotiations with the British governor in Quebec as a ruse to prevent an invasion of Vermont, not as a serious effort to become a British colony.

== Later life ==
One of the original white settlers of Cambridge, which was originally in Chittenden County and is now part of Lamoille County, Fassett served as judge of the Chittenden County Court from 1787 to 1794. In 1787, 1788, 1790 and 1791 he represented Cambridge in the Vermont House of Representatives. Other newly-chartered towns in which he received land grants as payment for his government service included Benson, Brookfield, Chittenden, Fair Haven, Groton, Waterford, Montgomery, Morristown, Woodbury, and Fletcher.

Fassett died in Cambridge on April 2, 1803. (Note: Vermont death record indicates April 2, headstone indicates April 10.) He was buried at Mountain View Cemetery in Cambridge.
