= Smugglers' Notch Resort =

Ski area in Vermont, United States

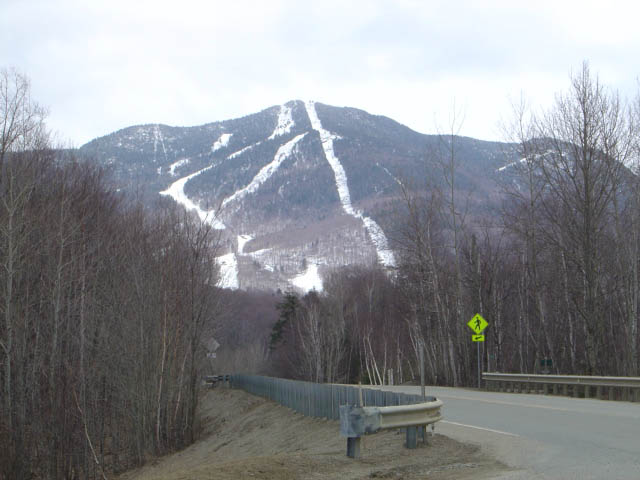
- Smugglers' Notch as seen from the access road
- Interactive map of Smugglers' Notch Resort
- Location: Town of Cambridge, near Jeffersonville, Vermont, U.S.
- Nearest city: Burlington, Vermont, U.S.
- Coordinates: 44°34′22″N 72°46′34″W
- Vertical: 2,610 feet (800 m)
- Top elevation: 3,640 feet (1,110 m)
- Base elevation: 1,030 feet (310 m)
- Trails: 78; 19% Easy; 50% Intermediate; 25% Difficult; 6% Extremely difficult
- Lift system: 8 (6 chairlifts, 2 surface lifts)
- Snowfall: 312 inches (7.9 m)
- Website: www.smuggs.com

Smugglers' Notch Resort is a ski resort area in the town of Cambridge, Vermont, United States, located near the village of Jeffersonville. Its vertical drop of 2,610 feet (800 m) is the fourth largest in New England and the third largest in Vermont. Its namesake is a narrow notch (mountain pass) running adjacent to Sterling Mountain, which smugglers used in the early 19th century. Smugglers' Notch, nicknamed Smuggs, consists of three mountains: Morse, Madonna, and Sterling. The resort attracts skiers in the winter and summer vacationers during the warmer months.

== History ==
Smugglers' Notch was founded in 1956 by a group of Vermont skiers. The first lifts were two Pomas (or platter lifts) on Sterling Mountain.

In the early 1960s, Tom Watson Jr., Chairman of IBM, became involved with the mountain. The site of the village today was an open field and a logging station. Watson envisioned a village patterned after those found in Europe. Soon, he developed the nearby Morse and Madonna mountains. It is said that Watson placed the bottom of the Madonna I chairlift several feet below the lodge to obtain the honor of owning the world's longest bottom-drive chairlift at the time.

After this was done, Watson started on the village at Morse that he had envisioned. He hired Stanley Snider of Stanmar, a Massachusetts-based developer and Martha's Vineyard resort owner, to create that village. After a heart attack, Watson began to divest in some of his business holdings and sold Smuggs to Snider and Stanmar, who operated the resort for years. At that time, Terpstra and Morrow constructed a large in-ground pool and 24 four-bedroom, four-bath, pool-front luxury condominiums. They hired Bill Stritzler, who owned a home at Smuggs, from AT&T as the managing director of the resort. When Snider retired, he sold the resort to Stritzler.

== Area ==
Smugglers' Notch's namesake originates from the smugglers of the early nineteenth century, who utilized the thick forest on the mountain range, as well as the caves and caverns along the Long Trail, to transport illegal or embargoed goods across the Canada–US border. The notch was most likely involved in bootlegging during the Prohibition era of the 1920s, using the same caves as a cache for smuggled Canadian beer, wine, and spirits. Scenic Smugglers' Notch proper comprises the Sterling Mountain/Spruce Peak ridgeline to the east and Mount Mansfield to the west. Extremely steep terrain drops down into the notch where Vermont Route 108 winds through switchbacks below, connecting Smugglers' Notch Resort with adjacent Stowe Mountain Resort a few miles to the south. The road is closed to cars from November to April, but open to snowmobilers and winter sports enthusiasts.

== Winter ==
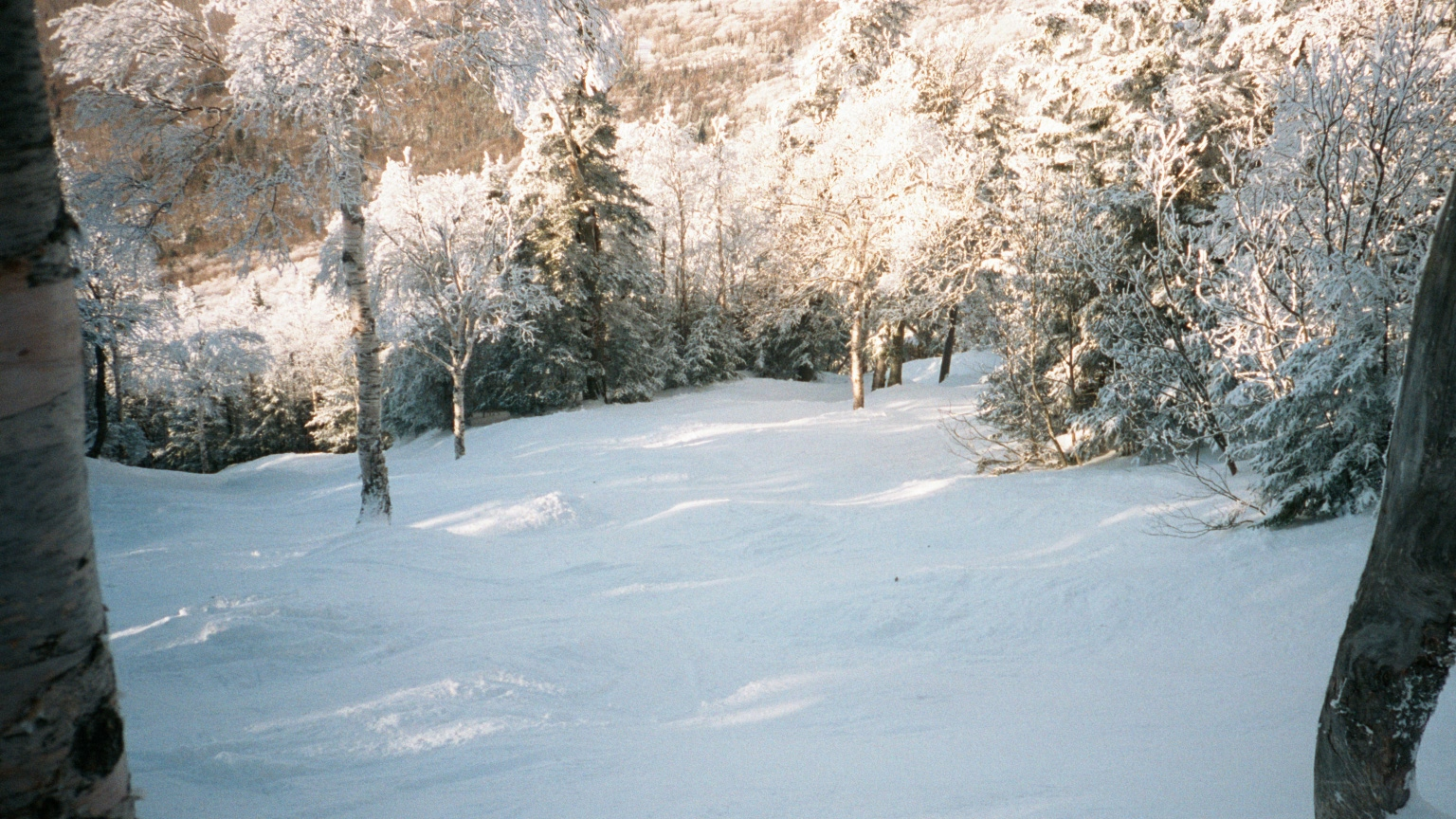
Entrance to Lower Doc Dempsey's Glades at Smugglers' Notch

In the winter, the resort centers around alpine skiing and snowboarding across three interconnected mountains: Morse, Sterling, and Madonna. Terrain ranges from gentle novice trails and family learning zones on Morse Mountain to intermediate and expert runs on Sterling and Madonna. The resort is notable for featuring Vermont’s only triple black diamond trail, The Black Hole.

Smugglers’ Notch operates a fleet of Hall double chairlifts, as well as surface lifts serving beginner areas. In addition to downhill skiing, winter activities include cross-country skiing, snowshoeing, tubing, ice skating, and organized children’s programs through Snow Sport University. The resort is frequently recognized for its family-oriented amenities and ski school programs, which consistently rank among the best in North America.

== Resort ==
Smugglers' Notch Resort is owned by William Stritzler.

== Spring, Summer, and Fall ==
Outside of the ski season, Smugglers’ Notch Resort operates as a year-round destination focused on family recreation and outdoor adventure. In summer, the resort offers eight heated pools, waterslides, mountain biking, hiking, disc golf on championship-level courses, and the indoor FunZone 2.0 family entertainment complex. A full program of children’s camps, guided hikes, nature programs, and evening entertainment is also available.

In spring and fall, the resort emphasizes outdoor activities such as hiking, disc golf, and scenic exploration of the Green Mountains. Fall foliage season is a particularly popular draw, with the resort serving as a base for leaf-peeping, photography, and harvest-themed events. Year-round, Smugglers’ Notch also features lodging, dining, and organized family programming, positioning itself as a four-season resort destination.

== Climate ==
Climate data for Smugglers Notch Resort 44.5890 N, 72.7869 W, Elevation: 1,163 ft (354 m) (1991–2020 normals)
Month	Jan	Feb	Mar	Apr	May	Jun	Jul	Aug	Sep	Oct	Nov	Dec	Year
Mean daily maximum °F (°C)	24.7 (−4.1)	27.9 (−2.3)	36.8 (2.7)	50.3 (10.2)	64.0 (17.8)	72.2 (22.3)	76.7 (24.8)	75.2 (24.0)	68.2 (20.1)	54.7 (12.6)	41.9 (5.5)	30.4 (−0.9)	51.9 (11.1)
Daily mean °F (°C)	15.9 (−8.9)	18.2 (−7.7)	27.4 (−2.6)	40.7 (4.8)	53.8 (12.1)	62.4 (16.9)	66.9 (19.4)	65.4 (18.6)	58.1 (14.5)	45.9 (7.7)	34.3 (1.3)	23.0 (−5.0)	42.7 (5.9)
Mean daily minimum °F (°C)	7.1 (−13.8)	8.4 (−13.1)	17.9 (−7.8)	31.2 (−0.4)	43.5 (6.4)	52.5 (11.4)	57.2 (14.0)	55.6 (13.1)	47.9 (8.8)	37.2 (2.9)	26.8 (−2.9)	15.6 (−9.1)	33.4 (0.8)
Average precipitation inches (mm)	3.83 (97)	3.03 (77)	3.96 (101)	4.67 (119)	4.83 (123)	5.61 (142)	5.33 (135)	5.04 (128)	5.17 (131)	6.11 (155)	4.91 (125)	4.42 (112)	56.91 (1,445)
Average snowfall inches (cm)	30.1 (76)	31.0 (79)	25.6 (65)	7.7 (20)	0.6 (1.5)	0.0 (0.0)	0.0 (0.0)	0.0 (0.0)	0.0 (0.0)	1.9 (4.8)	11.2 (28)	31.2 (79)	139.3 (353.3)
Source 1: PRISM Climate Group
Source 2: NOAA (Jeffersonville snowfall)
