= Cambridge, Vermont =

- Town
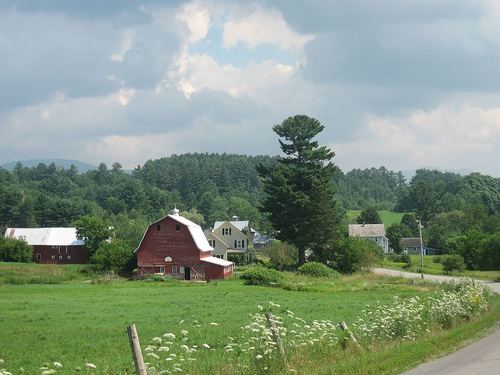
- Street view entering Cambridge

- Logo

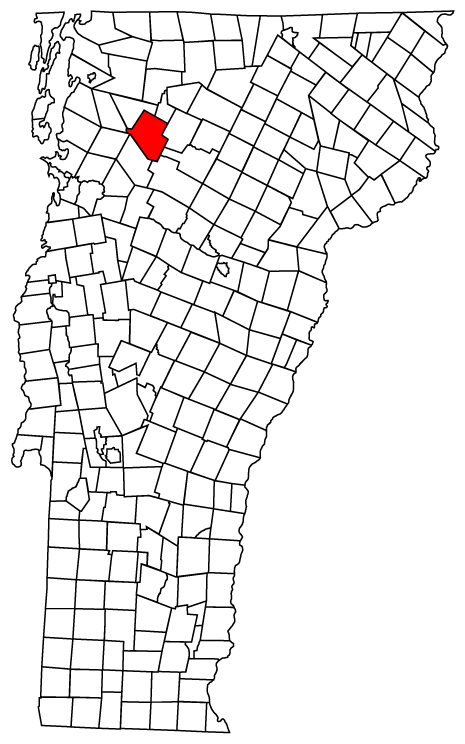
- Cambridge, Vermont
- Coordinates: 44°37′40″N 72°48′35″W
- Country: United States
- State: Vermont
- County: Lamoille
- Chartered: 1781
- Communities: Cambridge; Cambridge Junction; Jeffersonville; Morses Mill; North Cambridge; Pleasant Valley; South Cambridge

Area
  - Total: 63.69 sq mi (164.95 km^{2})
  - Land: 63.19 sq mi (163.66 km^{2})
  - Water: 0.50 sq mi (1.29 km^{2})
- Elevation: 758 ft (231 m)

Population (2020)
  - Total: 3,839
  - Density: 61/sq mi (23.5/km^{2})
- Time zone: UTC-5 (Eastern (EST))
  - Summer (DST): UTC-4 (EDT)
- ZIP Codes: 05444 (Cambridge); 05464 (Jeffersonville); 05492 (Waterville); 05656 (Johnson)
- Area code: 802
- FIPS code: 50-11500
- GNIS feature ID: 1462063
- Website: www.cambridge.vermont.gov

Cambridge is a town in Lamoille County, Vermont, United States. The population was 3,839 at the 2020 United States Census. Cambridge includes the villages of Jeffersonville and Cambridge.

== History ==
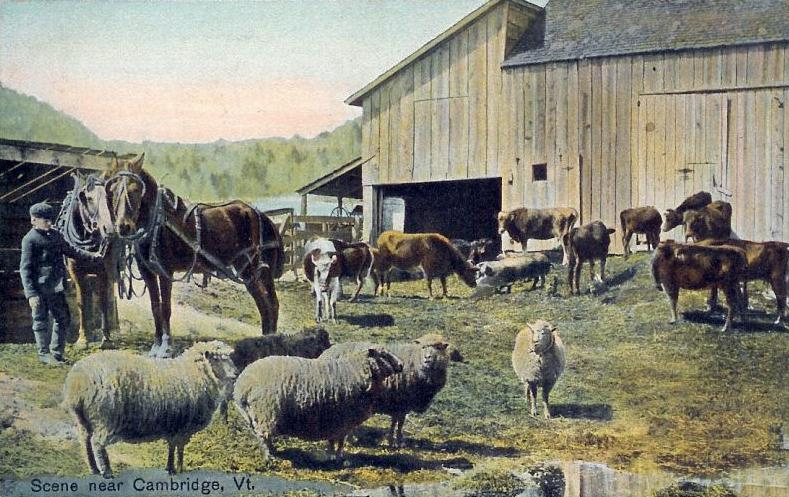
Farm scene c. 1908

Granted on November 7, 1780, Cambridge was chartered on August 13, 1781, to Samuel Robinson, John Fassett Jr., Jonathan Frost and 64 others. It was first settled in 1783 by John Safford from Piermont, New Hampshire. The valleys proved good but rough, best for grazing livestock. By 1839, the town had about 7,000 sheep. The Lamoille River offered water power for watermills. Industries included one woolen factory, one tannery, and one gristmill, plus several sawmills and cabinet shops.

Cambridge and neighboring Johnson were together known as the King's College Tract, being created by Lieutenant Governor Cadwallader Colden by authority of King George III in 1764. The King's College Tract was reserved for the eventual establishment of a university on the site. The place name "Cambridge" suggests the University of Cambridge in England. Johnson, the other town in the King's College Grant, was named for William Samuel Johnson.

Both the St. Johnsbury & Lake Champlain Railroad and the Burlington & Lamoille Railroad passed through the town. The former is now the Lamoille Valley Rail Trail.

== Geography ==
Cambridge is in western Lamoille County, bordered to the northwest by Franklin County and to the southwest by Chittenden County. The village of Jeffersonville is in the center of the town, and the village of Cambridge is in the west. According to the United States Census Bureau, the town has a total area of 63.7 square miles (164.9 km^{2}), of which 63.2 square miles (163.7 km^{2}) are land and 0.50 square miles (1.3 km^{2}), or 0.78%, are water. Cambridge is drained by the Lamoille River, which flows from east to west across the center of the town, passing through the north sides of Jeffersonville and Cambridge villages. Two main tributaries of the Lamoille drain the southern part of the town: the Brewster River originates in Smugglers Notch at the crest of the Green Mountains in the southernmost part of the town and flows north to Jeffersonville, while the Seymour River originates in Underhill and flows north to Cambridge village.

The town is crossed by Vermont Route 15, Vermont Route 104, Vermont Route 108 and Vermont Route 109. VT-15 leads southwest 27 miles (43 km) to Winooski, next to Burlington, and southeast 16 miles (26 km) to Morrisville. VT-104 leads northwest 22 miles (35 km) to St. Albans, while VT-108 leads north 20 miles (32 km) to Enosburg Falls and south through Smugglers Notch 17 miles (27 km) to Stowe. VT-109 leads northeast 11 miles (18 km) to Belvidere. (All distances are measured from Jeffersonville.)

== Economy ==
The largest employer in the town is Smugglers' Notch Resort.

== Demographics ==
Historical population
Census	Pop.	Note	%±
1790	359		—
1800	733		104.2%
1810	990		35.1%
1820	1,176		18.8%
1830	1,613		37.2%
1840	1,790		11.0%
1850	1,849		3.3%
1860	1,784		−3.5%
1870	1,651		−7.5%
1880	1,750		6.0%
1890	1,689		−3.5%
1900	1,606		−4.9%
1910	1,696		5.6%
1920	1,593		−6.1%
1930	1,402		−12.0%
1940	1,383		−1.4%
1950	1,435		3.8%
1960	1,295		−9.8%
1970	1,528		18.0%
1980	2,019		32.1%
1990	2,667		32.1%
2000	3,186		19.5%
2010	3,659		14.8%
2020	3,839		4.9%
U.S. Decennial Census

As of the census of 2000, there were 3,186 people, 1,266 households, and 886 families residing in the town. The population density was 50.0 people per square mile (19.3/km^{2}). There were 1,363 housing units at an average density of 21.4 per square mile (8.3/km^{2}). The racial makeup of the town was 96.52% White, 0.25% Black or African American, 0.56% Native American, 0.13% Asian, 0.06% from other races, and 2.48% from two or more races. Hispanic or Latino of any race were 0.75% of the population.

There were 1,266 households, out of which 32.8% had children under the age of 18 living with them, 60.3% were married couples living together, 6.9% had a female householder with no husband present, and 30.0% were non-families. 20.1% of all households were made up of individuals, and 5.5% had someone living alone who was 65 years of age or older. The average household size was 2.51 and the average family size was 2.91.

In the town, the population was spread out, with 24.4% under the age of 18, 7.6% from 18 to 24, 35.9% from 25 to 44, 23.6% from 45 to 64, and 8.6% who were 65 years of age or older. The median age was 36 years. For every 100 females, there were 101.3 males. For every 100 females age 18 and over, there were 102.3 males.

The median income for a household in the town was $44,950, and the median income for a family was $49,274. Males had a median income of $35,264 versus $23,199 for females. The per capita income for the town was $20,527. About 2.9% of families and 5.2% of the population were below the poverty line, including 2.3% of those under age 18 and 5.9% of those age 65 or over.

== Sites of interest ==
- Smugglers Notch
- Smugglers' Notch Resort
- Smugglers' Notch State Park

== Notable people ==
- John Fassett Jr., Vermont Supreme Court justice, 1778–1786
- Bernie Juskiewicz, former Vermont state representative (2013–2019) and businessman
- Anson D. Morse, educator and historian
- Lucy Wheelock, educator and Wheelock College founder
- William C. Wilson, justice of the Vermont Supreme Court
