= Cambridge (village), Vermont =

Cambridge, Vermont
- Village
- Location in Vermont Location in the United States
- Coordinates: 44°38′21″N 72°52′33″W
- Country: United States
- State: Vermont
- County: Lamoille
- Town: Cambridge

Area
  - Total: 1.26 sq mi (3.27 km^{2})
  - Land: 1.24 sq mi (3.20 km^{2})
  - Water: 0.023 sq mi (0.06 km^{2})
- Elevation: 663 ft (202 m)

Population (2020)
  - Total: 210
  - Density: 170/sq mi (66/km^{2})
- Time zone: UTC-5 (Eastern (EST))
  - Summer (DST): UTC-4 (EDT)
- ZIP code: 05444
- Area code: 802
- FIPS code: 50-11425
- GNIS feature ID: 2378302

Cambridge is a village in the town of Cambridge, Lamoille County, Vermont, United States. The population was 210 at the 2020 census.

== Geography ==
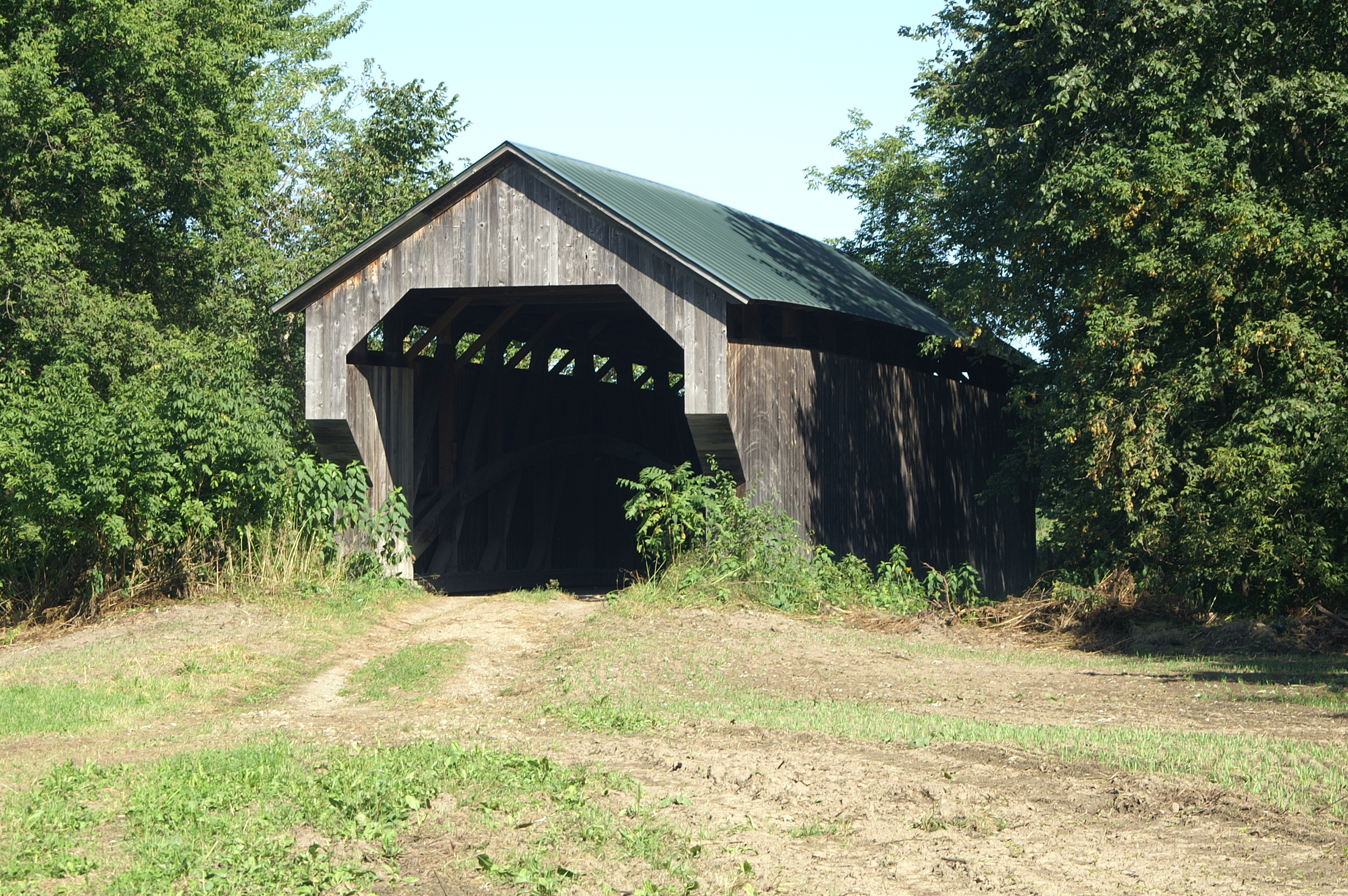
Gates Farm covered bridge in Cambridge

According to the United States Census Bureau, the village has a total area of 1.3 square miles (3.3 km^{2}), all land.

== Demographics ==
Historical population
| Census | Pop. | Note | %± |
|---|---|---|---|
| 1910 | 595 | | — |
| 1920 | 293 | | −50.8% |
| 1930 | 237 | | −19.1% |
| 1940 | 217 | | −8.4% |
| 1950 | 244 | | 12.4% |
| 1960 | 217 | | −11.1% |
| 1970 | 235 | | 8.3% |
| 1980 | 217 | | −7.7% |
| 1990 | 292 | | 34.6% |
| 2000 | 235 | | −19.5% |
| 2010 | 236 | | 0.4% |
| 2020 | 210 | | −11.0% |
U.S. Decennial Census

As of the census of 2010, there were 236 people, 115 households, and 53 families residing in the village. The population density was 190.3 people per square mile (71.51/km^{2}). There were 115 housing units at an average density of 92.7/sq mi (34.84/km^{2}). The racial makeup of the village was 94.04% White, 0.85% Black or African American, and 5.11% from two or more races.

As of the 2000 census, there were 95 households, out of which 30.5% had children under the age of 18 living with them, 49.5% were married couples living together, 4.2% had a female householder with no husband present, and 44.2% were non-families. 28.4% of all households were made up of individuals, and 6.3% had someone living alone who was 65 years of age or older. The average household size was 2.42 and the average family size was 3.08.

In the village, the population was spread out, with 24.3% under the age of 18, 14.0% from 18 to 24, 35.7% from 25 to 44, 17.4% from 45 to 64, and 8.5% who were 65 years of age or older. The median age was 32 years. For every 100 females, there were 95.8 males. For every 100 females age 18 and over, there were 97.8 males.

The median income for a household in the village was $31,250, and the median income for a family was $36,563. Males had a median income of $27,000 versus $18,929 for females. The per capita income for the village was $15,528. None of the families and 9.0% of the population were living below the poverty line.
