= Mount Mansfield =

Highest mountain in Vermont, United States

- Mozôdebiwajok
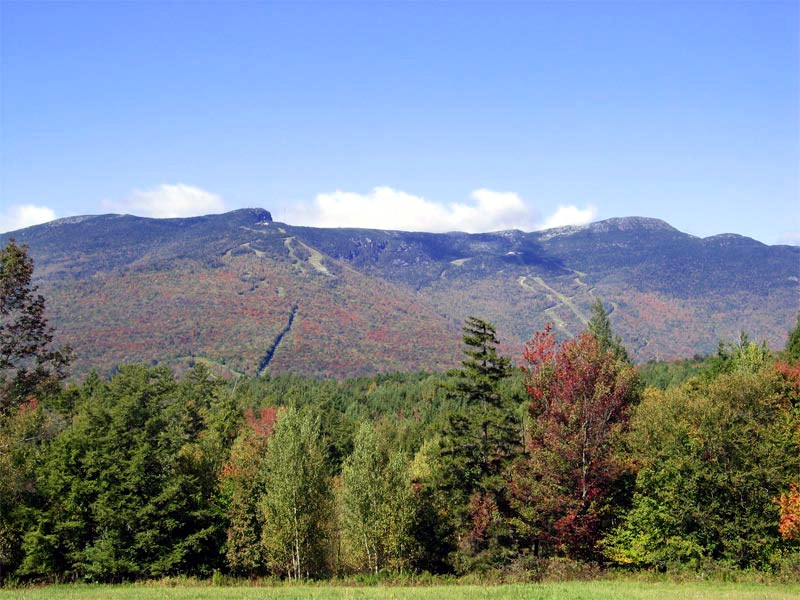
- Mount Mansfield, September 2004

Highest point
- Elevation: 4,395 ft (1,340 m) NAVD 88
- Prominence: 3,633 ft (1,107 m)
- Listing: U.S. state high point 26th New England Fifty Finest 3rd New England 4000-footers
- Coordinates: 44°32′38″N 72°48′52″W

Geography
- Location within Vermont
- Location: Chittenden County-Lamoille County border, Vermont, U.S.
- Parent range: Green Mountains
- Topo map: USGS Mount Mansfield

Climbing
- Easiest route: Hike

U.S. National Natural Landmark
- Designated: 1980

Mount Mansfield is the highest mountain in Vermont, reaching an elevation of 4,393 feet (1,339 m) above sea level. Located in the northwest of the state, it is also the highest peak in the Green Mountains. Its summit is located within the town of Underhill in Chittenden County; the ridgeline, including some secondary peaks, extends into the town of Stowe in Lamoille County, and the mountain's flanks also reach into the town of Cambridge.

When viewed from the east or west, the mountain has the appearance of a (quite elongated) human profile, with distinct forehead, nose, lips, chin, and Adam's apple. These features are most recognizable when viewed from the east; unlike most human faces, the chin is the highest point. The Abenaki describe the mountain as having the appearance of a moose.

Located in Mount Mansfield State Forest, the mountain is used for various recreational and commercial purposes. "The Nose" is home to transmitter towers for a number of regional radio and TV stations. There are many hiking trails, including the Long Trail, which traverses the main ridgeline. In addition, the east flank of the mountain is used by the Stowe Mountain Resort for winter skiing. A popular tourist activity is to drive the 4.5-mile (7.2 km) toll road, a steep, mostly unpaved road with several hairpin turns, from the Stowe Base Lodge to "The Nose" and then hike along the ridge to "The Chin."

Mount Mansfield is one of three locations in Vermont where true alpine tundra survives from the Ice Ages. A few acres exist on Camel's Hump and Mount Abraham nearby and to the south, but Mount Mansfield's summit still holds about 200 acres (81 ha). In 1980, the Mount Mansfield Natural Area was designated as a National Natural Landmark by the National Park Service.

== Name ==
Prior to the mid-eighteenth century, the mountain was known by its Abenaki name, Mozôdebiwajok, which translates to Moosehead Mountain. The name of the mountain today comes from the now-dissolved town of Mansfield, Vermont, in which the mountain was located (its territory was later divided between the towns of Underhill and Stowe), but the source of the town's name is the subject of some dispute.

Several of the original grantees of the land in Mansfield were from Mansfield, Connecticut, which in turn is known to have been named for Moses Mansfield, one of the chief landowners there. However, Benning Wentworth, the governor of the British colony of New Hampshire, issued a charter to a group of grantees in what he dubbed the town of Mansfield, possibly for a chief justice of England, Lord Mansfield (a British judge who deemed slavery illegal on British soil in 1772). Wentworth had good reason to honor Lord Mansfield by naming a town after him: Mansfield and another English official had jointly ruled in 1752 that the land between the Connecticut River and Lake Champlain should be considered part of the Wentworth-governed royal province of New Hampshire, and not of New York, which also claimed that territory.

The Town of Mansfield was formed before anyone involved had visited the site; when the townsite was surveyed, it was discovered to be mostly mountainside. Although a few hardy pioneers settled in the town's few lowlands, the town was dissolved by degrees, with the portion generally west of the mountain being annexed to Underhill in 1839, the eastern portion to Stowe in 1848 after a vote of the citizenry. The dividing line did not run exactly along the ridge of the mountain; thus, the Chin is in Underhill and the Nose in Stowe.

== Geology and soils ==
The dominant bedrock of Mt. Mansfield is a mica-albite-quartz schist common to the Green Mountains, with mica being the most abundant mineral. Layers of quartzite are found locally. The soils, mostly podzol, are stony with fine-earth fractions grading through textures of fine sandy loam, loam and silt loam; they are mapped mostly as Londonderry, Lyman, Peru and Tunbridge Series with considerable areas of rock outcropping around the summit.

== Topography ==
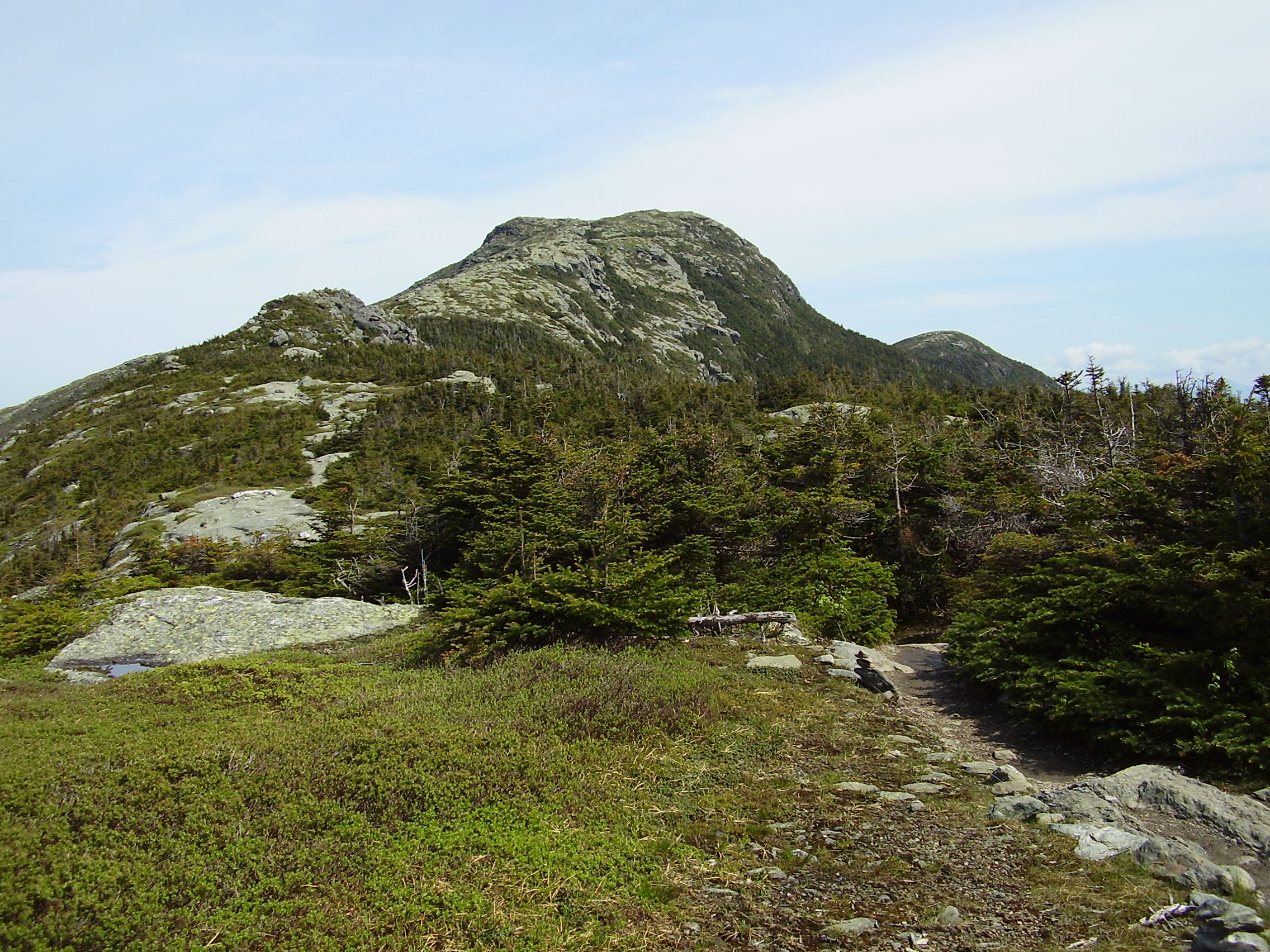
Mansfield's summit

The ridge which forms the "head" of the "man" is aligned generally north and south. The "Adam's apple" is on the north end of the ridge, and the "forehead" to the south. From north of the mountain, looking south, this ridge appears as a triangular peak. At the northeastern portion of the mountain, there are cliffs. At the base of these cliffs (on the western side of the Notch Road, Vermont Route 108), there is a honeycomb network of talus caves. There are cliffs on the eastern side of the Notch Road as well. These two sets of facing cliffs are separated by 3 yards (2.7 m) at their base.

== Skiing ==
Mt. Mansfield is the home of Stowe Mountain Resort, one of the oldest ski areas in the United States. Along with other expert trails, a group of trails, known as the "Front Four", are Goat, Starr, National and Liftline. They have steep pitches, many natural hazards (rocks and trees), and little grooming. There are also cross country ski trails around the base of the mountain and on its lower slopes. The Bruce Trail descends the east side of the mountain while the Teardrop Trail descends west side. In addition to Stowe Mountain resort, Skiing is also available at the nearby Smugglers' Notch Resort.

== Gallery ==
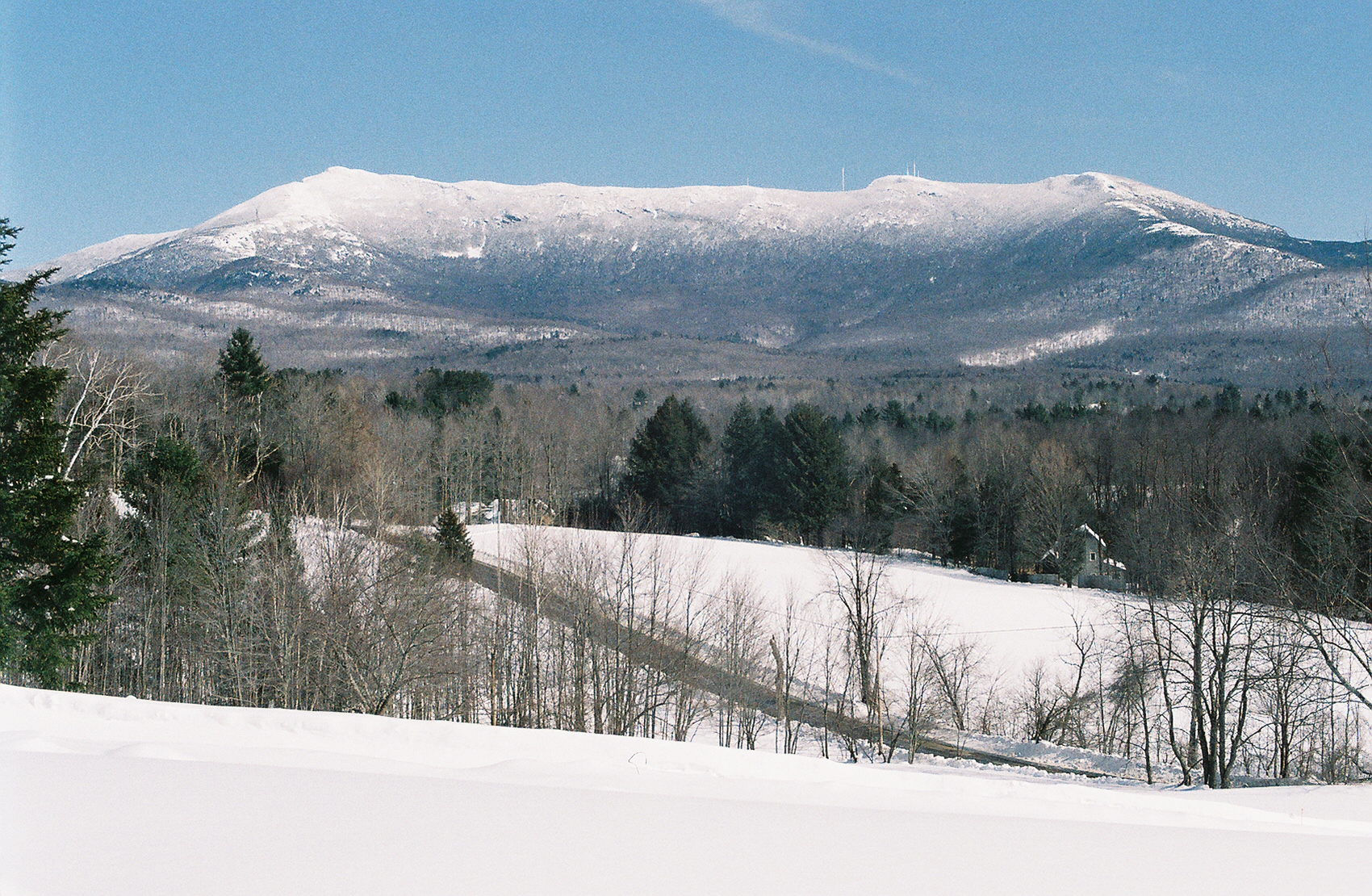
Western Slope of Mt. Mansfield from Underhill, Vermont

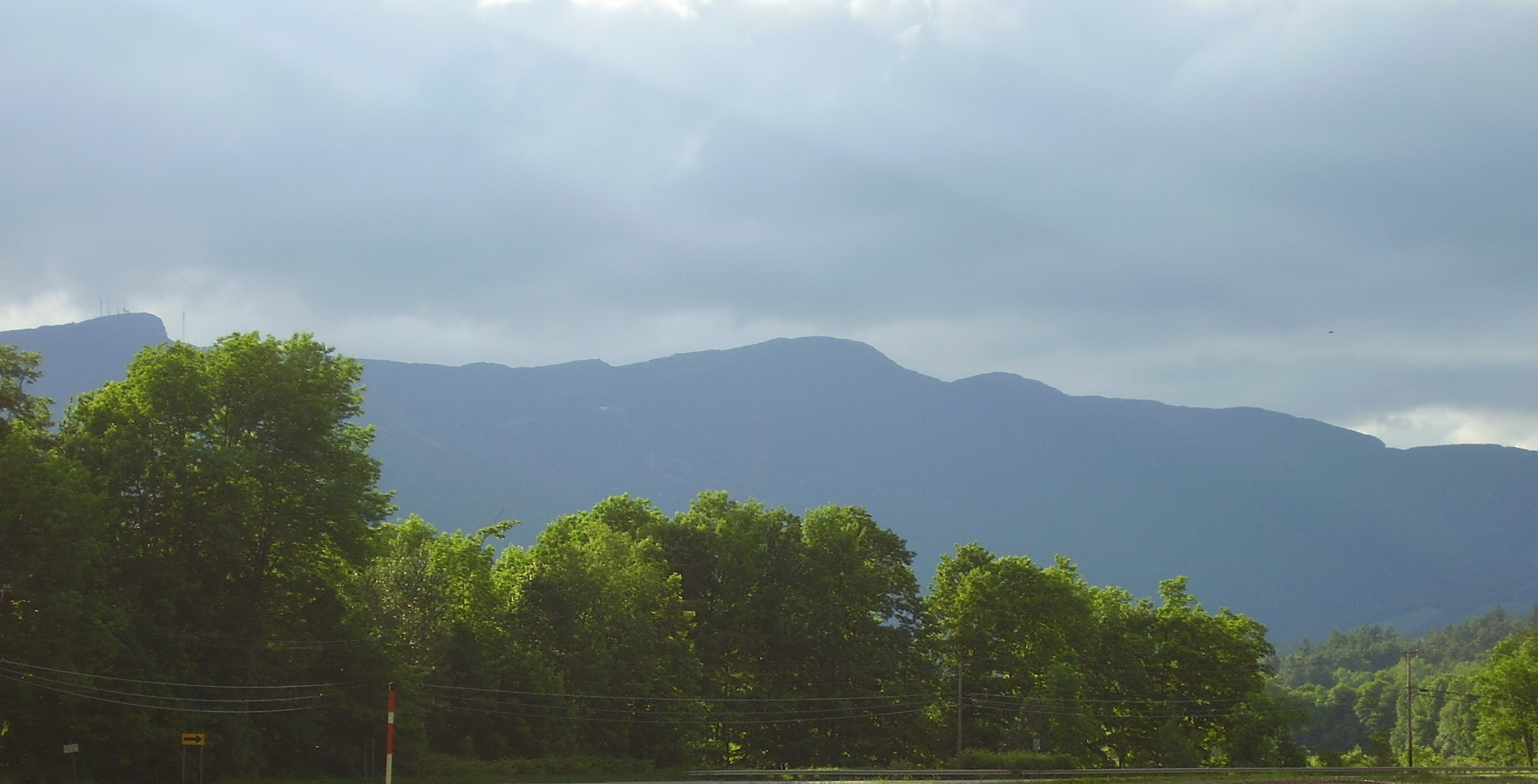
Mansfield from north of Stowe, Vermont

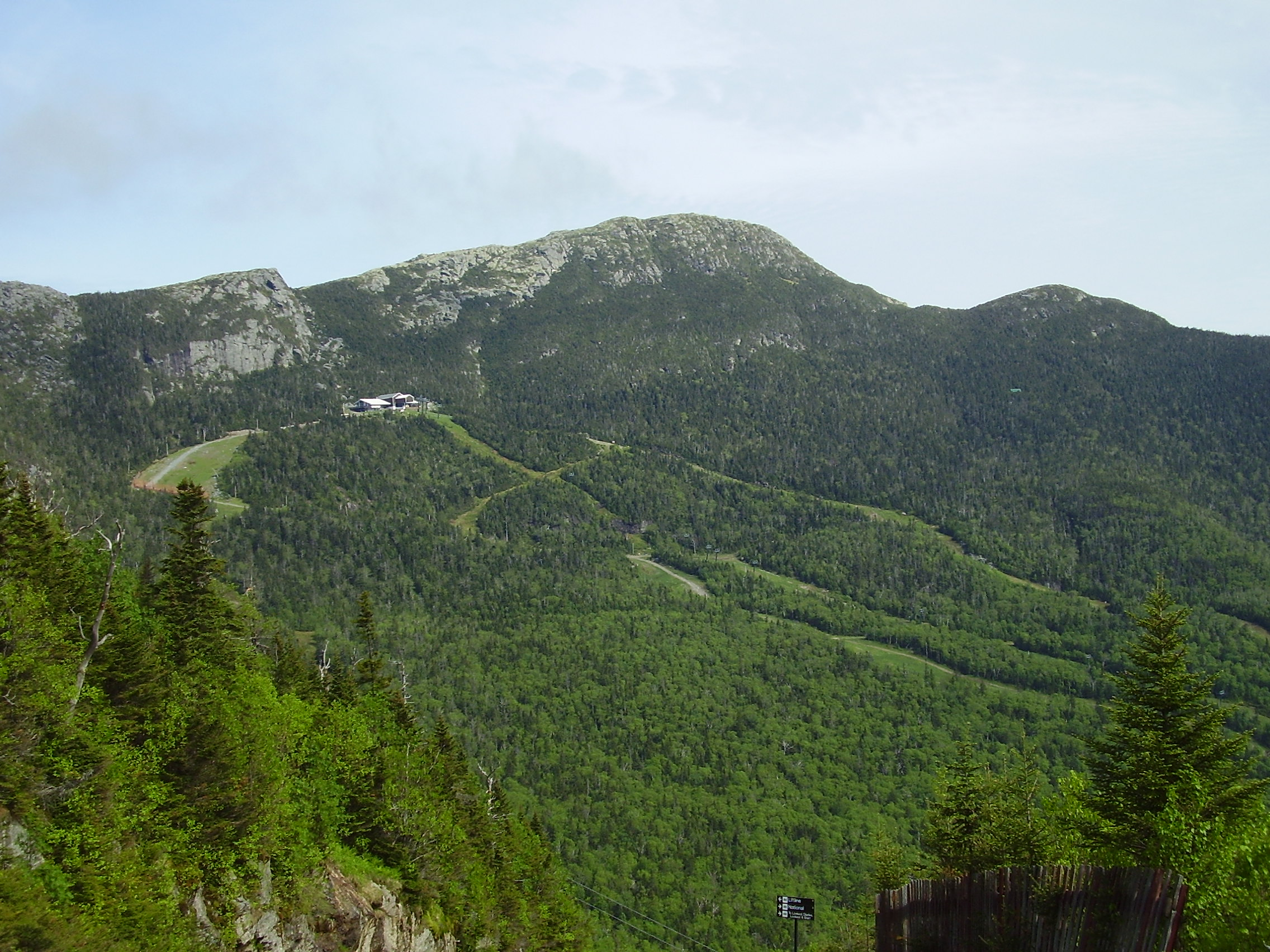
Mansfield from toll road

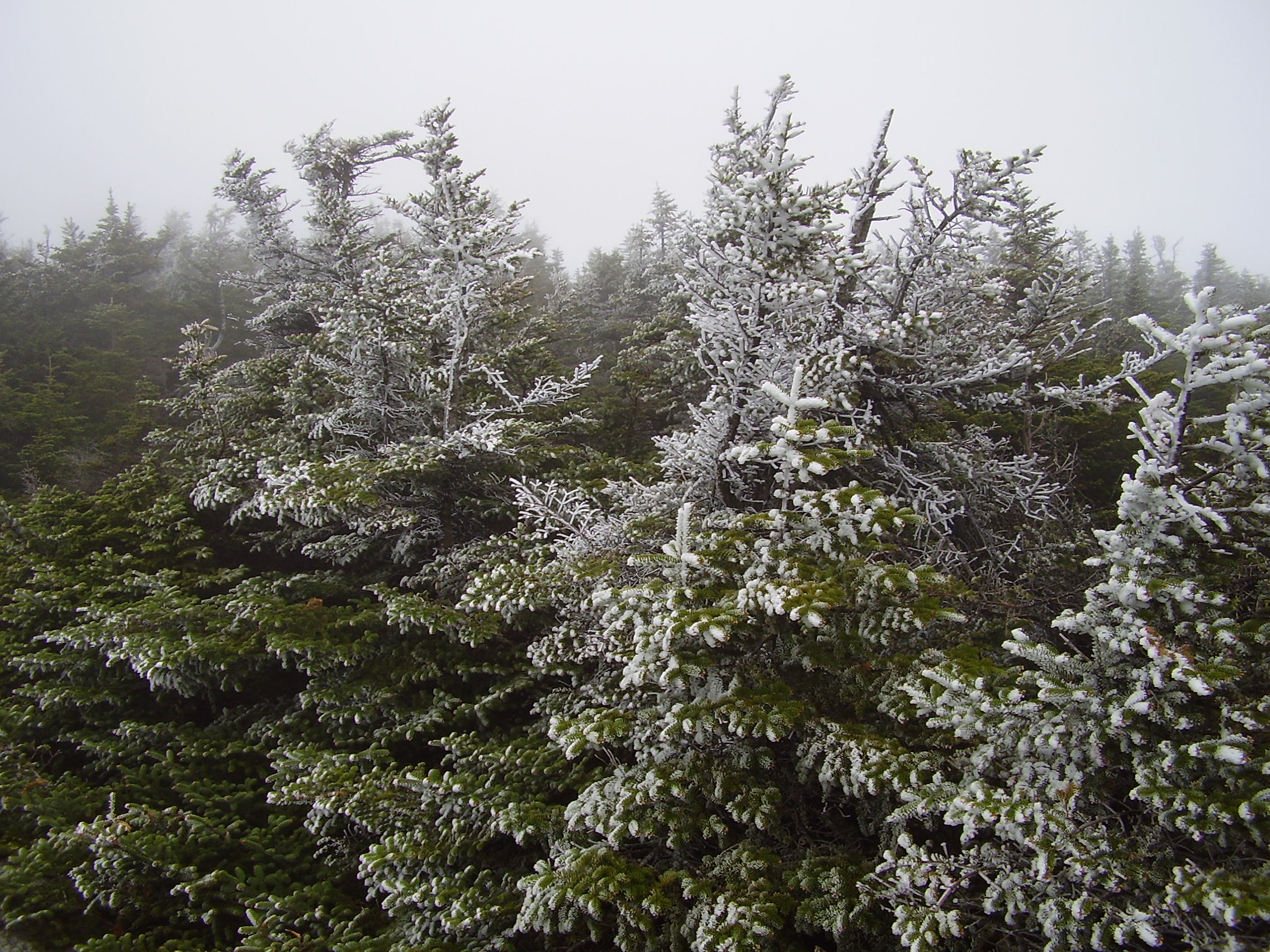
Rime ice in the Krummholz zone of Mansfield

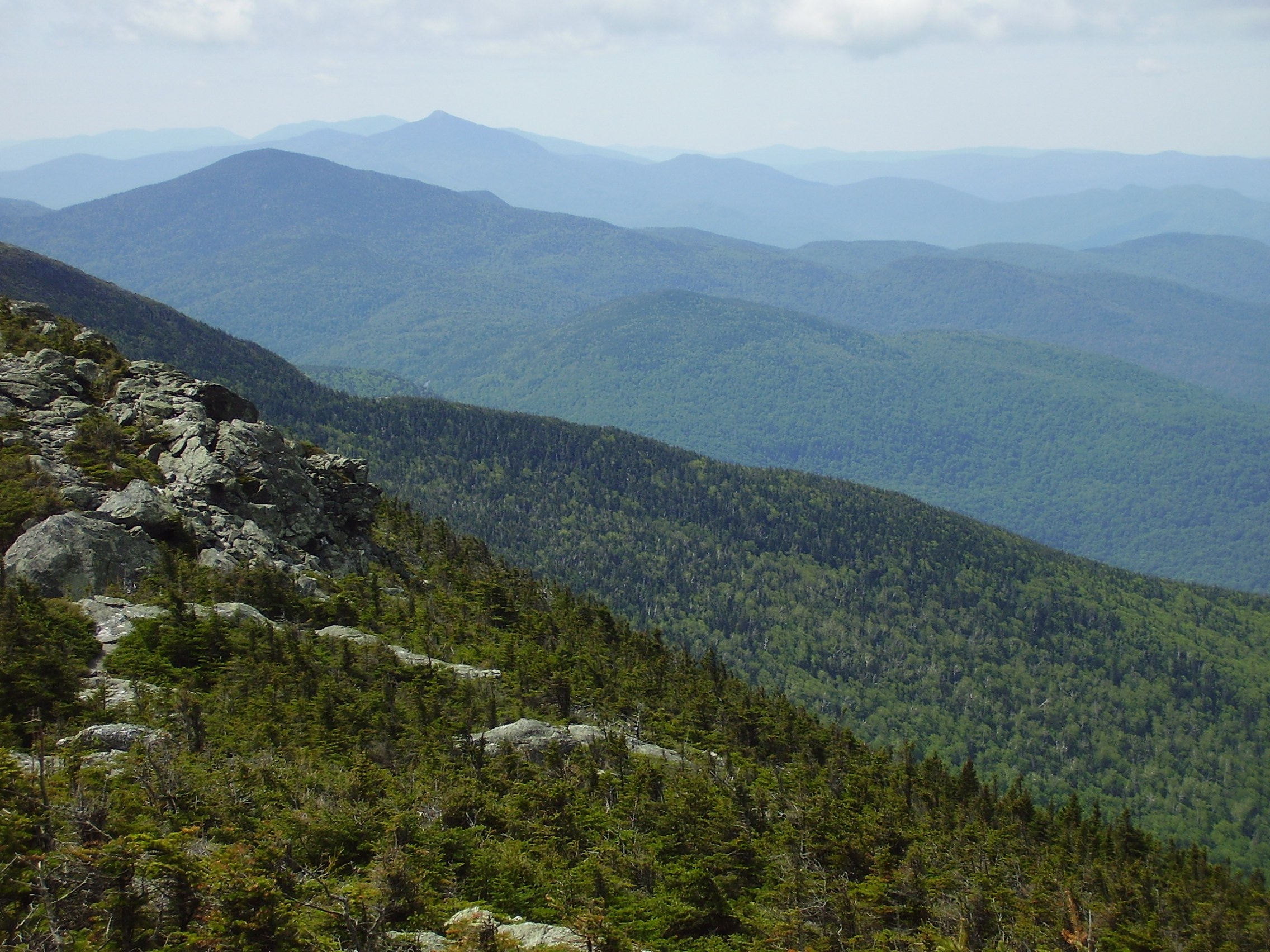
Looking south towards Camels Hump off the summit ridge

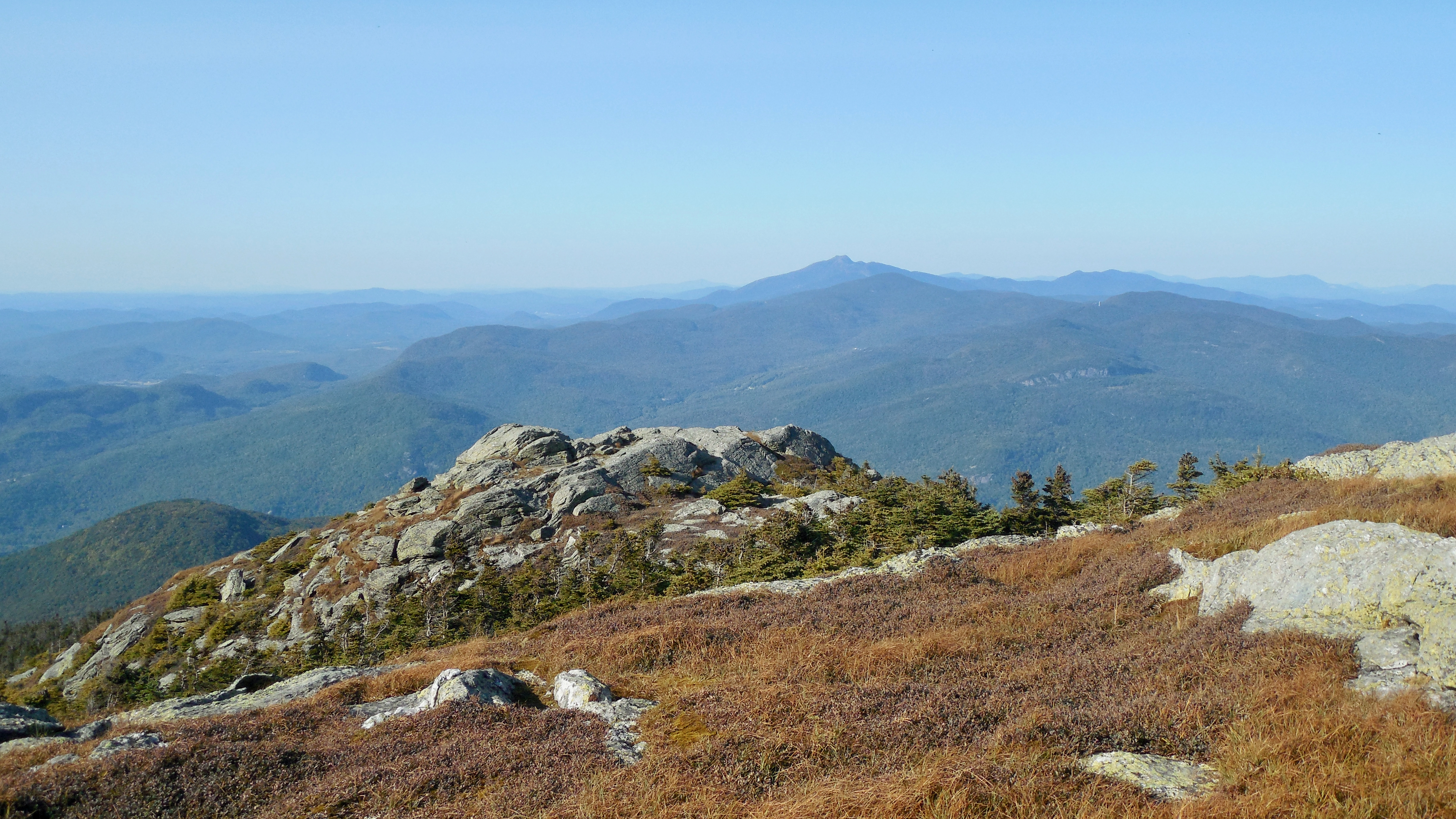
Northerly view of Mt. Mansfield from the summit of Camel's Hump

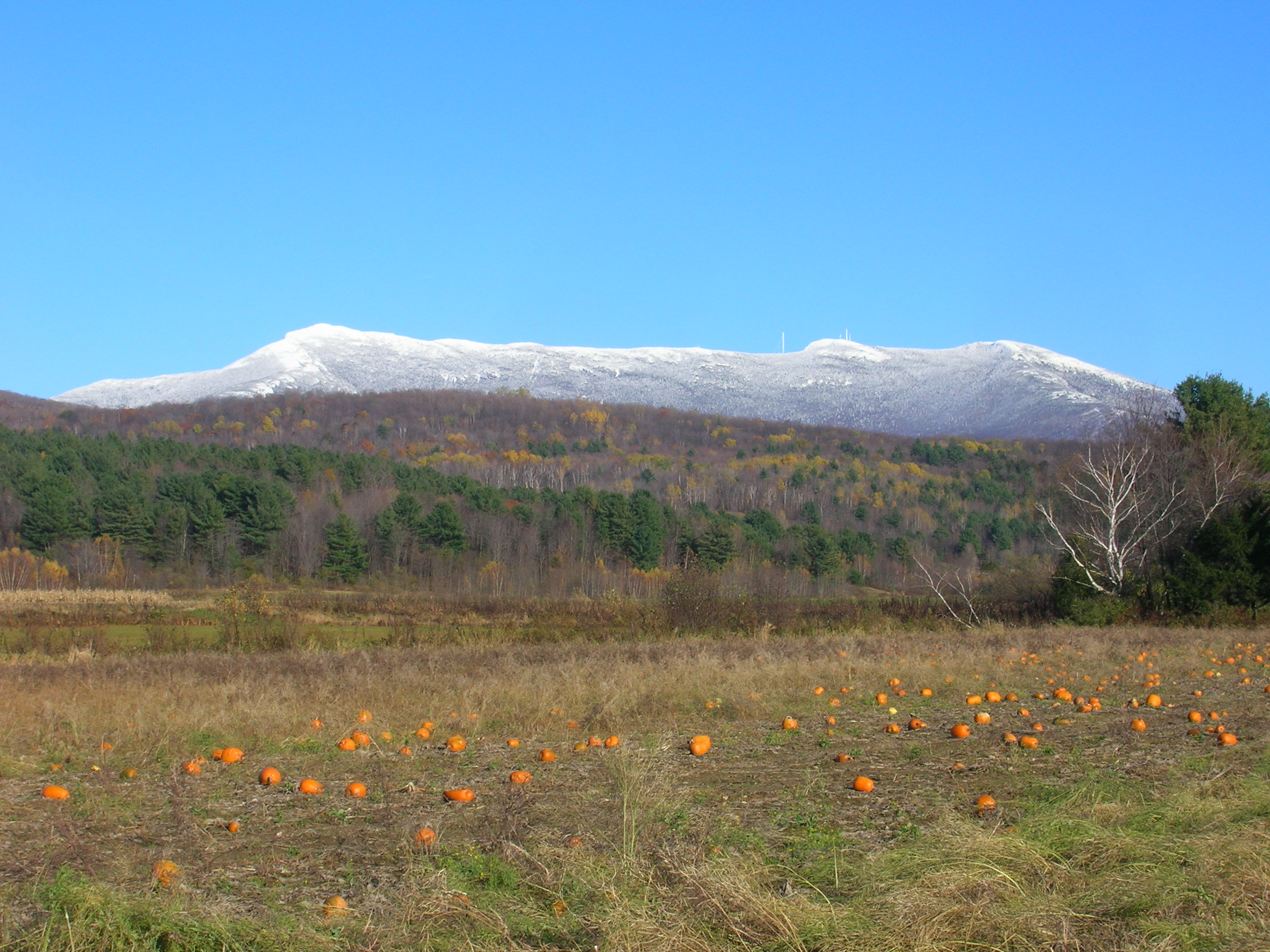
View from River Rd., Underhill

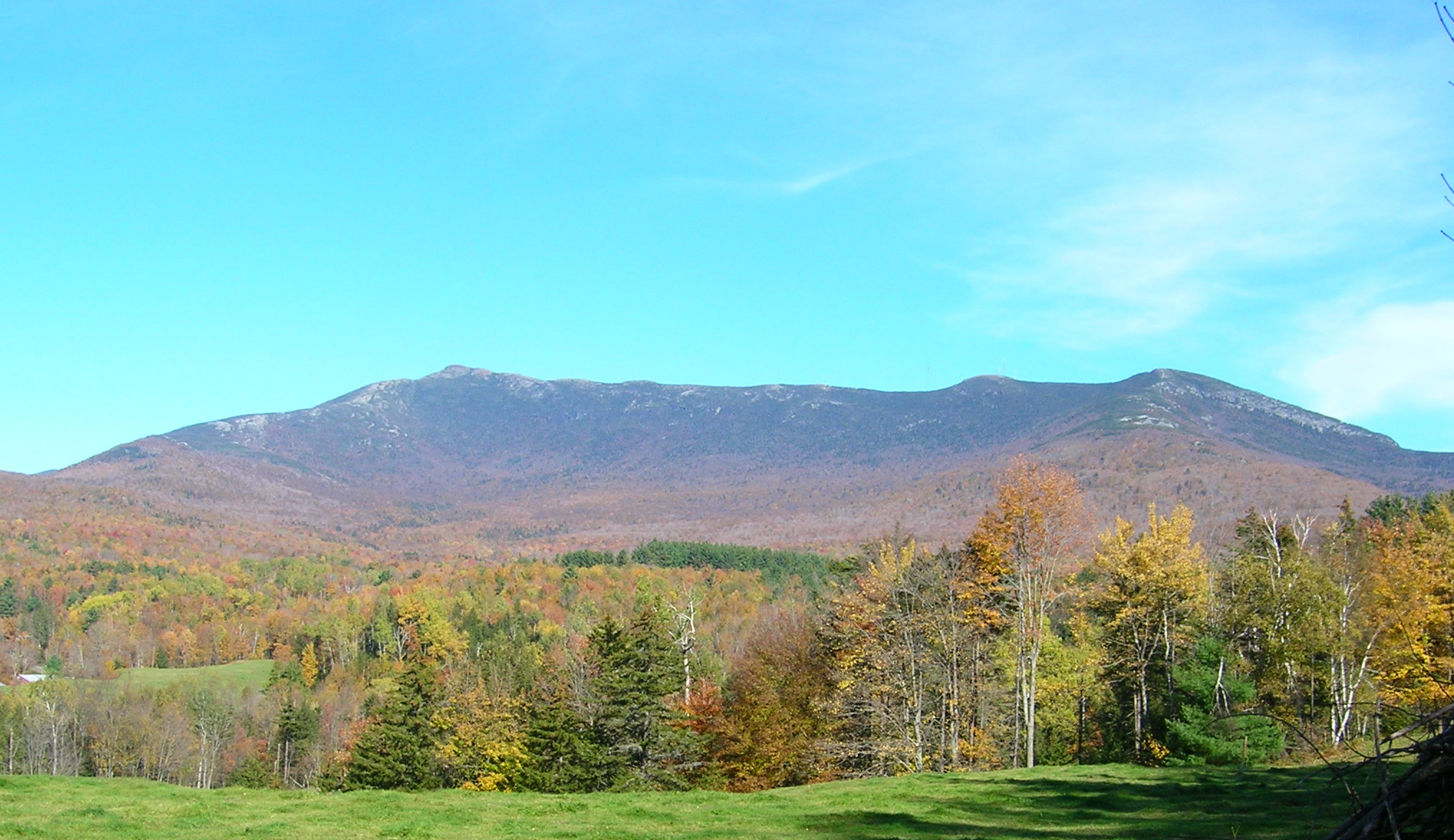
View from Stevensville Rd., Underhill

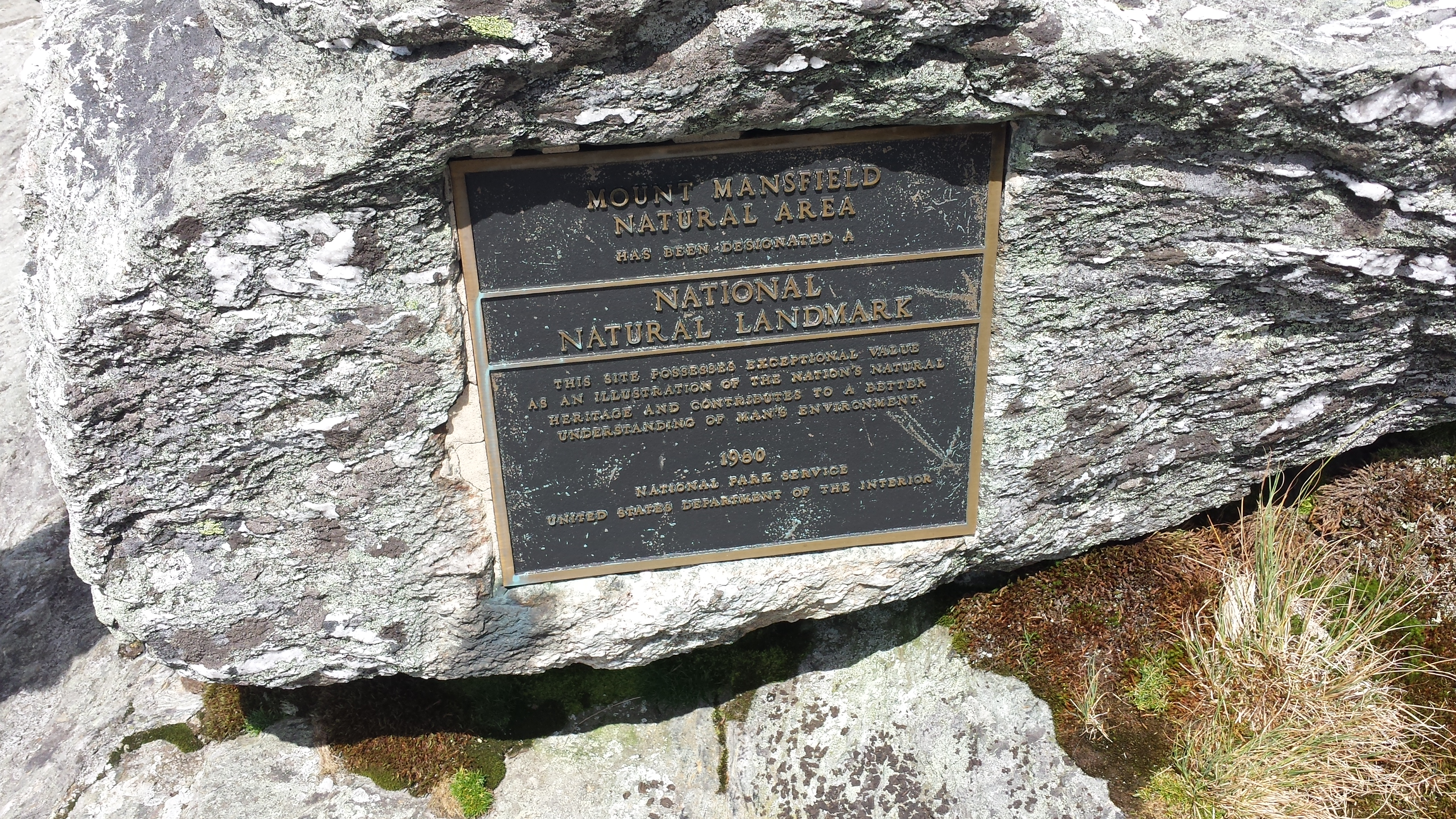
A plaque along the Long Trail between the "Chin" and the "Nose" of Mount Mansfield
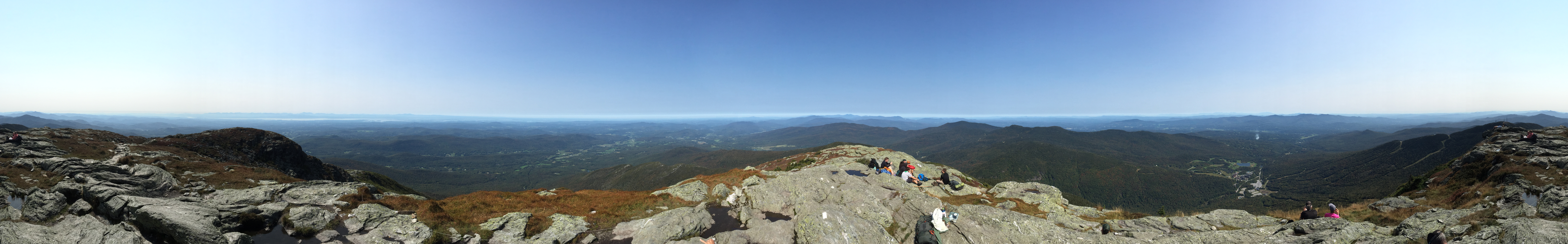
360-degree panorama from the top of Mount Mansfield

== Climate ==
Mount Mansfield is located in a boreal temperate rainforest and receives more than 80 inches of precipitation each year on average and has a humid boreal climate (Dfc). Lower elevations of the mountain have a humid continental climate

Summer days on the mountain are warm coupled with cool nights, while winters are long, cold and snowy, lasting from November through April and with annual snowfall averaging 235 in (6.0 m). The highest daily snowfall recorded was 28 in (71 cm) and occurred on March 15, 2017. The highest snow depth recorded was 149 in (3.8 m) and occurred on April 2 during the very snowy winter of 1969. According to the NOAA, snowfall has been recorded on the summit for every month of the year. Mount Mansfield averages 197.7 nights at or below 32 °F (0 °C) annually. Extreme temperatures ranges from 88 °F (31 °C) on August 12, 2025 to −39 °F (−39 °C) on January 9, 1968.

Climate data for Mount Mansfield, Vermont, 1991–2020 normals, extremes 1954–present
Month	Jan	Feb	Mar	Apr	May	Jun	Jul	Aug	Sep	Oct	Nov	Dec	Year
Record high °F (°C)	53 (12)	56 (13)	65 (18)	74 (23)	85 (29)	84 (29)	84 (29)	88 (31)	79 (26)	76 (24)	63 (17)	60 (16)	88 (31)
Mean maximum °F (°C)	42.2 (5.7)	38.7 (3.7)	46.9 (8.3)	60.4 (15.8)	70.9 (21.6)	75.3 (24.1)	76.0 (24.4)	74.2 (23.4)	71.3 (21.8)	62.4 (16.9)	52.6 (11.4)	43.7 (6.5)	77.6 (25.3)
Mean daily maximum °F (°C)	21.1 (−6.1)	22.7 (−5.2)	30.2 (−1.0)	42.6 (5.9)	57.0 (13.9)	65.3 (18.5)	69.0 (20.6)	67.6 (19.8)	61.1 (16.2)	47.7 (8.7)	36.2 (2.3)	26.6 (−3.0)	45.6 (7.6)
Daily mean °F (°C)	13.4 (−10.3)	15.0 (−9.4)	22.9 (−5.1)	35.0 (1.7)	48.9 (9.4)	57.8 (14.3)	62.2 (16.8)	60.9 (16.1)	54.2 (12.3)	41.4 (5.2)	29.8 (−1.2)	19.8 (−6.8)	38.4 (3.6)
Mean daily minimum °F (°C)	5.7 (−14.6)	7.3 (−13.7)	15.6 (−9.1)	27.5 (−2.5)	40.8 (4.9)	50.3 (10.2)	55.4 (13.0)	54.2 (12.3)	47.3 (8.5)	35.1 (1.7)	23.4 (−4.8)	12.9 (−10.6)	31.3 (−0.4)
Mean minimum °F (°C)	−22.4 (−30.2)	−18.1 (−27.8)	−12.1 (−24.5)	7.0 (−13.9)	21.6 (−5.8)	32.8 (0.4)	41.4 (5.2)	40.2 (4.6)	28.9 (−1.7)	16.7 (−8.5)	3.3 (−15.9)	−12.5 (−24.7)	−25.6 (−32.0)
Record low °F (°C)	−39 (−39)	−36 (−38)	−31 (−35)	−13 (−25)	5 (−15)	20 (−7)	26 (−3)	25 (−4)	16 (−9)	5 (−15)	−11 (−24)	−38 (−39)	−39 (−39)
Average precipitation inches (mm)	5.62 (143)	5.26 (134)	5.88 (149)	6.31 (160)	6.88 (175)	7.86 (200)	7.31 (186)	6.89 (175)	7.26 (184)	7.63 (194)	6.68 (170)	7.51 (191)	81.09 (2,061)
Average snowfall inches (cm)	40.9 (104)	44.6 (113)	38.7 (98)	21.4 (54)	5.5 (14)	0.0 (0.0)	0.0 (0.0)	0.0 (0.0)	0.1 (0.25)	10.1 (26)	30.4 (77)	43.2 (110)	234.9 (596.25)
Average extreme snow depth inches (cm)	54.6 (139)	74.7 (190)	88.3 (224)	84.8 (215)	53.6 (136)	2.4 (6.1)	0.0 (0.0)	0.0 (0.0)	0.0 (0.0)	5.8 (15)	18.8 (48)	35.7 (91)	92.0 (234)
Average precipitation days (≥ 0.01 in)	21.6	18.2	17.2	15.4	15.4	16.2	16.3	15.2	14.4	15.0	17.3	21.5	203.7
Average snowy days (≥ 0.1 in)	18.2	16.1	13.0	6.4	1.8	0.0	0.0	0.0	0.2	3.8	10.4	17.0	86.9
Source 1: NOAA
Source 2: National Weather Service

== See also ==
- Outline of Vermont
- Index of Vermont-related articles
- List of U.S. states by elevation
