= Stowe Mountain Resort =

Ski resort in Vermont, United States

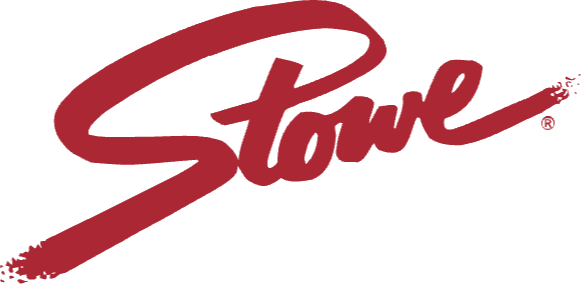

- Location in Vermont
- Location: Mount Mansfield; Lamoille County; Stowe, Vermont; United States
- Nearest city: Burlington
- Coordinates: 44°31′55″N 72°47′15″W
- Status: Operating
- Owner: Vail Resorts
- Vertical: 2,360 ft (719 m)
- Top elevation: 3,719 ft (1,134 m)
- Base elevation: 1,559 ft (475 m)
- Skiable area: 485 acres (1.96 km^{2})
- Trails: 116 total: 16% - beginner; 55% - intermediate; 30% - advanced/expert
- Longest run: Toll Road: 4.3 miles (7 km)
- Lift system: 12 total: 2 gondolas; 1 high-speed six-pack; 3 high-speed quads; 1 quad; 1 triple; 2 doubles; 2 surface lifts
- Lift capacity: 15,516 per hour
- Terrain parks: Yes, 4
- Snowfall: 224 in (570 cm)
- Snowmaking: Yes, 83%
- Night skiing: No
- Website: stowe.com

Stowe Mountain Resort is a ski resort in the northeastern United States, near the town of Stowe in northern Vermont, comprising two separate mountains: Mount Mansfield and Spruce Peak. The lift-served vertical drop of Mount Mansfield is 2,360 feet (719 m), the fifth largest in New England and the fourth largest in Vermont.

== History ==
Alpine skiing came to Vermont when the Civilian Conservation Corps (CCC) cut the first trails on Mount Mansfield in 1933. The National Ski Patrol was based on the Mount Mansfield Ski Patrol, the oldest in the nation founded in 1934. Stowe Mountain was also the first ski area in Vermont to have a single chair, which was installed by American Steel & Wire Company in 1940. Stowe was the second area in New England to have a chairlift, the first being Gunstock in 1937. The "Mansfield Single", was the first lift in the Mansfield area.

Stowe Mountain Resort was long owned in its entirety by the Mount Mansfield Company. It in turn was owned since 1949 by insurance mogul C.V. Starr, founder of the American International Group. AIG became the primary owner in 1988, until selling ski-related operations and facilities at the resort to Vail Resorts on February 21, 2017. AIG and the Mount Mansfield Company will retain the Stowe Mountain Lodge, Stowe Mountain Club, Stowe Country Club and other real estate owned and held for potential future development.

With $37 million in revenue during Winter 2007–08, Stowe placed second to Killington Ski Resort's $37.3 million in Vermont.

== Terrain and Lifts ==
The average annual snowfall at the resort summit is approximately 224 inches (570 cm).

The ski area is composed of Mount Mansfield and Spruce Peak. Some 116 trails on Spruce Peak and Mount Mansfield provide 40 miles (64 km) (485 acres (1.96 km^{2})) of skiable terrain.

Ahead of the 2011–2012 season, Stowe replaced the FourRunner high-speed quad with a new high-speed quad, constructed by Doppelmayr USA. The Sunrise Six also replaced the Mountain Triple in 2022.

=== Lifts ===
Stowe has a total of 10 chairlifts. There are 6 on the Mansfield side, and 4 on the Spruce Peak side. The Over Easy gondola connects both areas of the mountain.

==== Mount Mansfield ====
Name	Type	Manufacturer	Built	Vertical	Length	Notes
Mansfield Gondola	Gondola 8	Poma	1991	2100	7664	Received major electrical upgrades and minor mechanical upgrades in 2014. Cabins were also Re-built at CWA in St. Jerome Quebec in 2014.
Over Easy	Gondola 6	Leitner-Poma	2006	12	1483	Riders can load/unload at both terminals.
Sunrise	High-Speed Six	Doppelmayr	2022	1214	4476	
FourRunner	High-Speed Quad	Doppelmayr	2011	2046	5882	
Toll House	Double	Doppelmayr	1983	890	6400	
Lookout	Double	Riblet	1979	1750	5341	Oldest lift in operation at Stowe. Received upgrades from Doppelmayr in the 1980s due to the lifts large size.

==== Spruce Peak ====
Name	Type	Manufacturer	Built	Vertical	Length	Notes
Sensation	High-Speed Quad	Leitner-Poma	2005	1454	5889	
Sunny Spruce	High-Speed Quad	Leitner-Poma	2004	865	3769	
Adventure	Fixed-grip Triple	Leitner-Poma	2004	127	980	
Meadows	Fixed-grip Quad	Doppelmayr	2014	432	1734	Has a Chairkit loading conveyor.

== Gallery ==
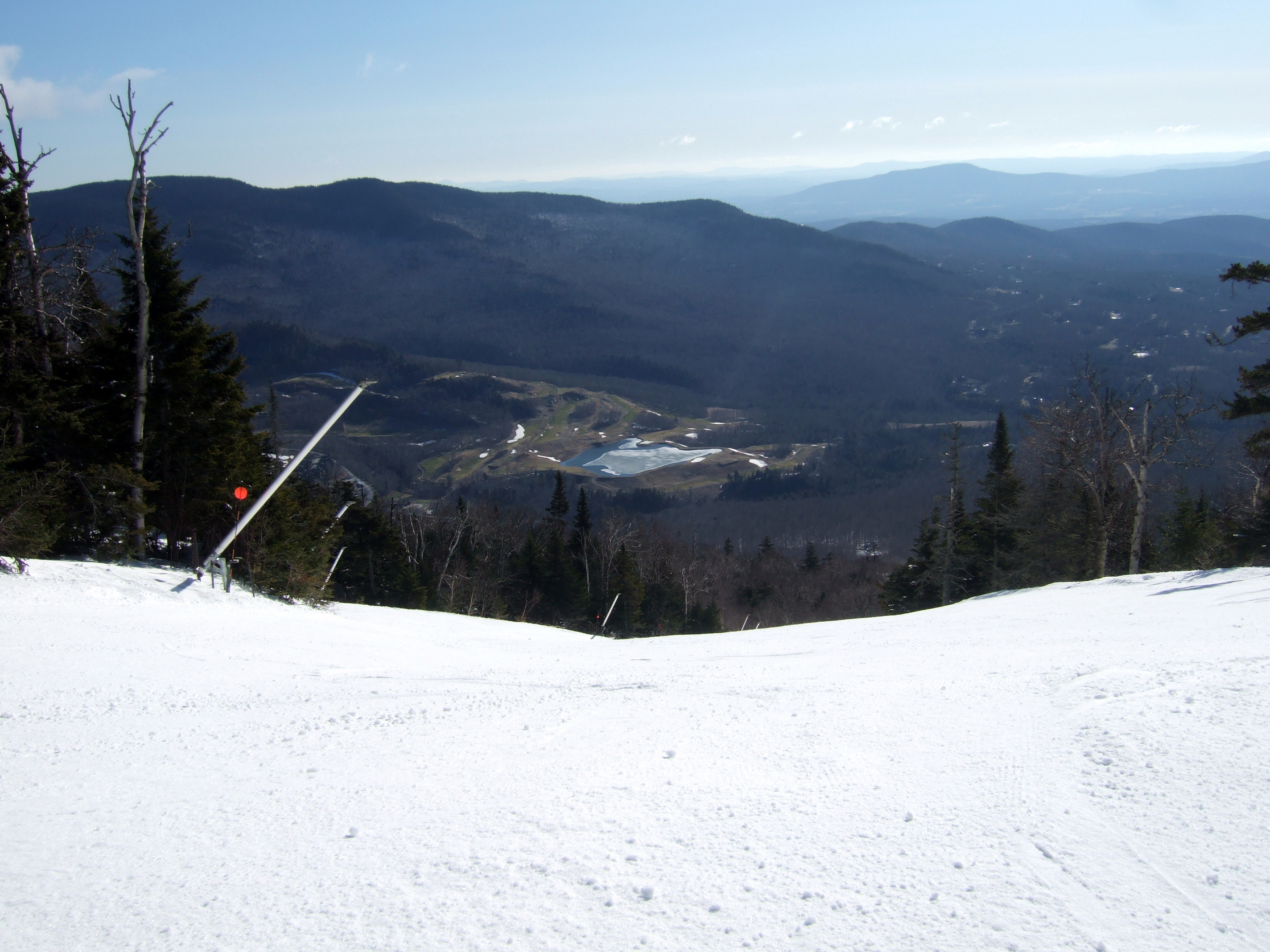
View to the east from Mt. Mansfield

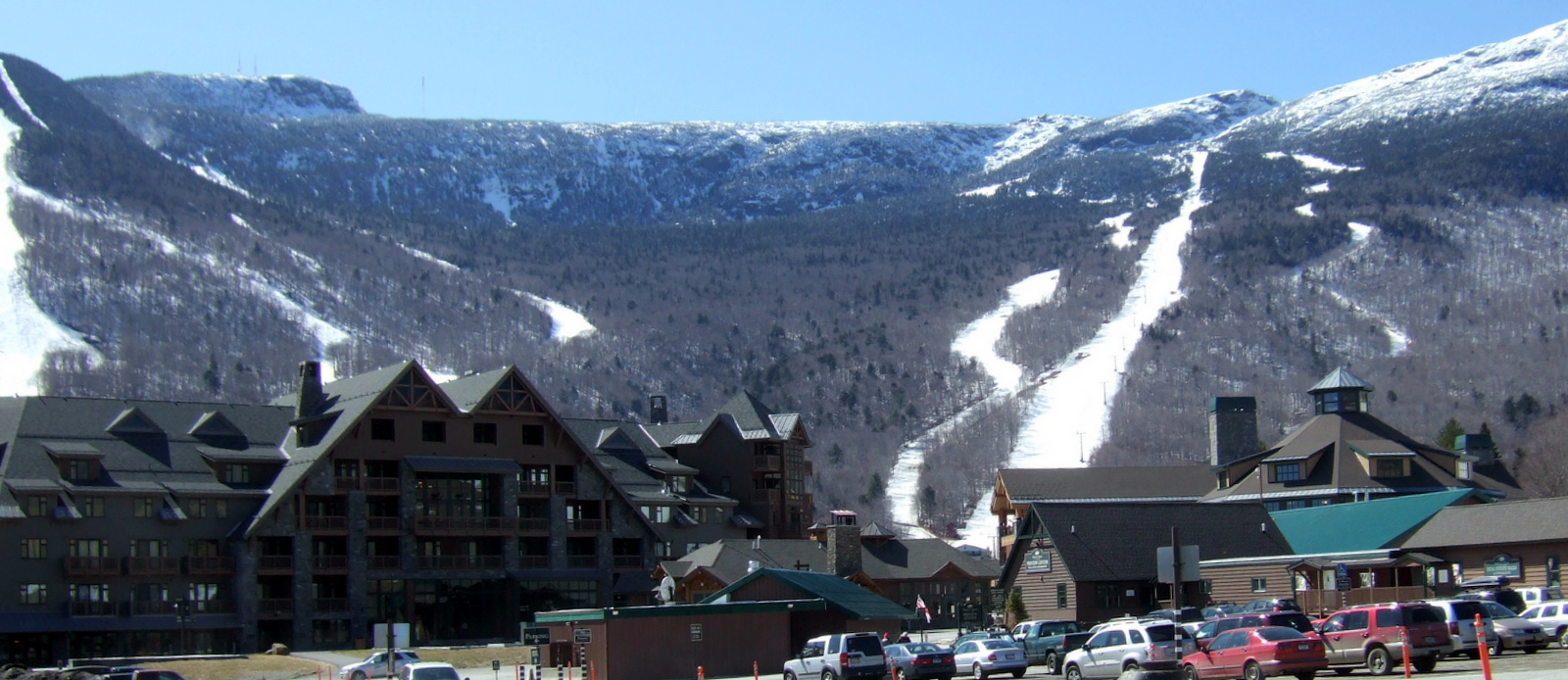
The new village expansion featuring Stowe Mountain Lodge

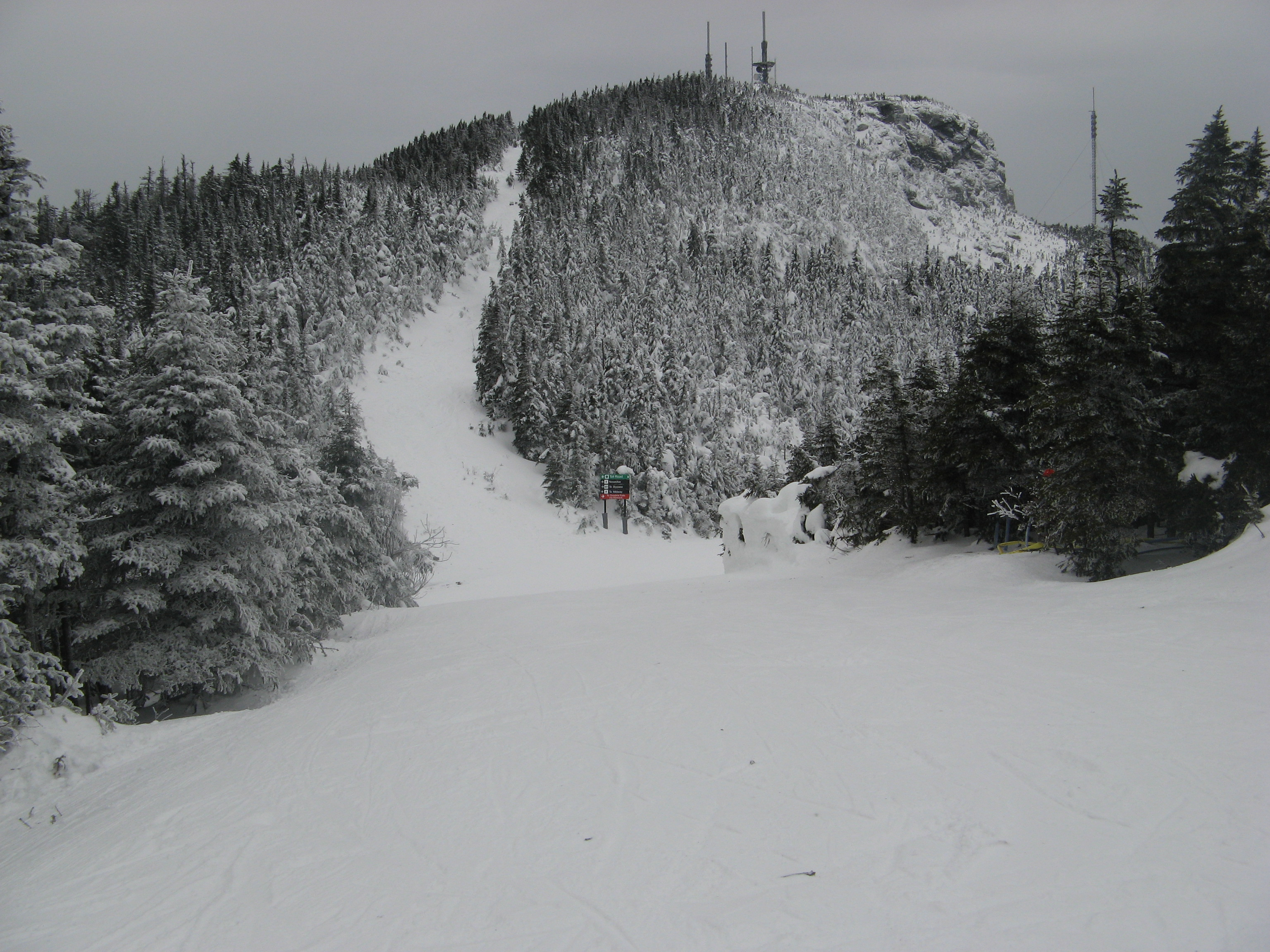
Looking up towards Mt. Mansfield's summit.
