= St. Johnsbury and Lamoille County Railroad =

Former railroad in northern Vermont, USA

Overview
- Reporting mark: SJL
- Locale: Vermont
- Dates of operation: 1948–1995
- Predecessors: Ogdensburg and Lake Champlain Railroad, St. Johnsbury and Lake Champlain Railroad
- Successor: Lamoille Valley Rail Trail

Technical
- Track gauge: 4 ft 8 1/2 in (1,435 mm) standard gauge
- Length: 193.7 miles (311.7 km)

The St. Johnsbury and Lamoille County Railroad (StJ&LC) was a railroad located in northern Vermont. It provided service to rural parts of the state for over a century, until track deterioration and flood damage made the line unusable and uneconomical to repair, which forced the line to close in 1995. The 95 mile route from St. Johnsbury to Swanton has since been converted into a rail trail, known as the Lamoille Valley Rail Trail. Upon opening in 2023, it was the longest rail trail in New England.

== History ==
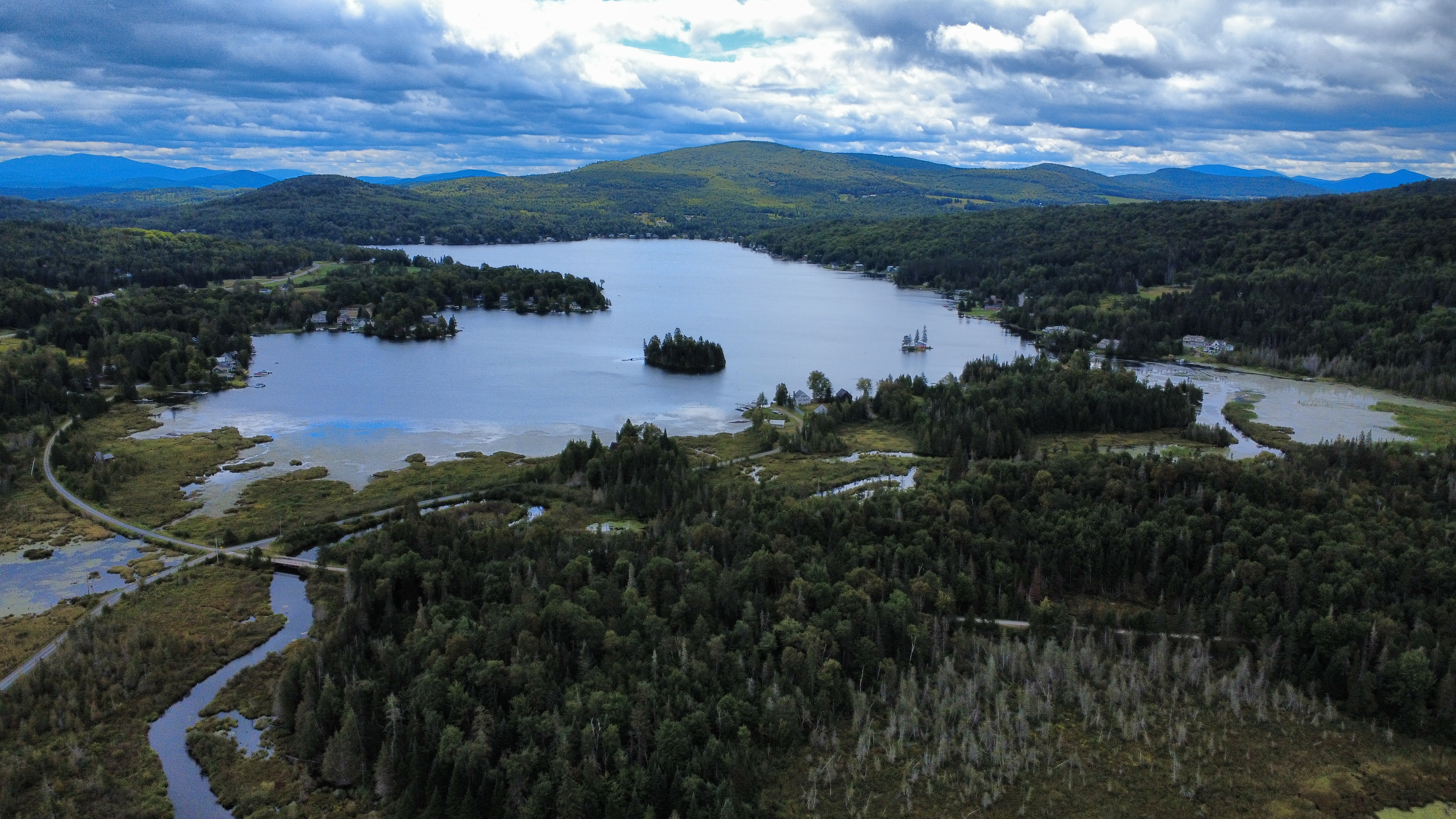
Joe's Pond, Vermont, from the north, showing part of the Lamoille Valley Rail Trail

The railroad began construction in December 1869 as part of the Vermont Division of the Portland and Ogdensburg Railway to connect the Great Lakes with the seaport of Portland, Maine. It would be completed on July 17, 1877, with Governor Horace Fairbanks driving in the silver spike in Fletcher. Although the railroad had plans on expansion to Lake Ontario, the line originally ended at Swanton. The Vermont Division was extended to Rouses Point in 1883, allowing it to connect to the Ogdensburg and Lake Champlain Railroad and provide a direct connection to the Great Lakes.

The eastern end of the Vermont Division was leased to the Maine Central Railroad in 1912, and the remainder of the line became a subsidiary of the Boston and Maine Railroad. The Boston & Maine operated their segment as the St. Johnsbury and Lake Champlain Railroad after 1925. This segment was reorganized as the St. Johnsbury and Lamoille County Railroad in 1948.

Freight traffic of the late 1940s was 30% inbound commodities, 20% outbound dairy products to Boston, 15% outbound forest products, and 25% outbound stone products (such as limestone, talc and asbestos). The remaining 10% was bridge line traffic (westbound paper and eastbound feed) for the Maine Central Railroad Mountain Division. Six 70-ton General Electric Diesel locomotives replaced steam locomotives by 1950. Passenger service ended in 1956. Trucks had taken all of the milk traffic by 1961, but bridge line traffic had increased six-fold following the 1953 dissolution of Maine Central's joint operating agreement with Boston and Maine Railroad. Light-duty rail and covered bridges prevented the line from accepting new heavier "incentive" freight car loadings. The covered bridges were replaced or reinforced so worn out light diesel locomotives could be replaced by larger locomotives; but track conditions deteriorated under the heavier loads.

The State of Vermont purchased the line from Samuel Pinsly in 1973. The line was then operated by Morrison-Knudsen as the Vermont Northern Railroad for a time. In 1978, local shippers took over the operation and it became the Lamoille Valley Railroad. In 1989, the line was leased to a Florida company and was operated by them until major flooding in 1995 and 1997 damaged the line so much that it was not profitable to repair the track. In 2002, the state of Vermont started converting the 96-mile route into a recreational trail and created the Lamoille Valley Rail Trail, under a railbanking arrangement. The full trail became open to the public in May 2023.

== Route and Station listing ==
Milepost	Town / City	Station	Image	Note	Position
0.0	St. Johnsbury	St. Johnsbury		Interchange with Maine Central Railroad and Canadian Pacific Railway.	
1.4	St. Johnsbury			Fairbanks Scales factory	
11.48	Danville	Danville			
14.85	Danville	West Danville			
16.30	Danville	Joe's Pond			
19.7	Walden	Walden			
23.87	Walden	Dow			
27.80	Greensboro	Greensboro		In the village of Greensboro Bend, so named for the large arc of the track as it turned south to follow the Lamoille River.	
31.0	Hardwick	East Hardwick			
34.73	Hardwick	Hardwick		98-foot covered bridge built 1909 over the Lamoille River burned 1959.	
35.7	Hardwick	Granite Junction		Junction with Hardwick and Woodbury Railroad.	
39.0	Wolcott	Fisher Covered Railroad Bridge		Preserved 90-foot bridge built in 1908 over the Lamoille River. It was strengthened in 1968 to be the last covered railroad bridge in service.	
	Wolcott			120-foot covered bridge built 1909 over the Lamoille River. Replaced by Baltimore Truss steel bridge about 1917	
41.03	Wolcott	Wolcott			
48.88	Morrisville	Morrisville			
51.56	Hyde Park	Hyde Park			
56.35	Johnson	Johnson			
64.26	Cambridge	Cambridge Junction		Junction with Central Vermont Railroad. 113-foot covered bridge built 1899 over the Lamoille River replaced by steel bridge about 1968.	
68.81	Fletcher	Fletcher			
74.24	Fairfield	East Fairfield			
78.44	Fairfield	Fairfield			
83.05	Sheldon	Sheldon			
84.56	Sheldon	Sheldon Junction		Junction with the Missisquoi Railroad line	
87.40	Highgate	East Highgate			
90.91	Highgate	Highgate			
94.73	Swanton	East Swanton			
	Swanton	Swanton Covered Railroad Bridge		Three-span 369-foot covered bridge over the Missisquoi River built in 1898 was on the main line between East Swanton and Swanton. It was preserved by routing StJ&LC trains over the Central Vermont Railroad.	
96.10		Swanton		Station now houses Swanton Historical Society	
		Fonda Junction		Swanton Lime Works and interchange with Central Vermont Railroad	

== Locomotives ==
Number	Builder	Type	Date	Works number	Notes
11	Baldwin Locomotive Works	2-6-0	1909	33394	ex-Montpelier and Wells River Railroad #11 purchased 1926
21	ALCO Manchester	0-6-0	1909	46339	ex-Boston and Maine Railroad #286 purchased 1947 scrapped 1949
22	ALCO Manchester	0-6-0	1909	46338	ex-Boston and Maine Railroad #285 then Montpelier and Wells River Railroad 2nd #11 purchased 1944
23	ALCO Manchester	0-6-0	1908	45125	ex-Boston and Maine Railroad #272 then Montpelier and Wells River Railroad 2nd #9 purchased 1940 sold 1944
24	ALCO Manchester	0-6-0	1908	45131	ex-Boston and Maine Railroad #278 purchased 1930 scrapped 1949
25	ALCO Manchester	0-6-0	1908	45118	ex-Boston and Maine Railroad #265 purchased 1929 scrapped 1941
26	ALCO Manchester	2-6-0	1906	38990	ex-Boston and Maine Railroad #1419 purchased 1929
1st #27	ALCO Manchester	2-6-0	1910	47629	ex-Boston and Maine Railroad #1485 purchased 1929
2nd #27	Baldwin Locomotive Works	0-6-0	1923	56033	ex-McKeesport Connecting Railroad #27 purchased 1949 scrapped 1955
28	ALCO Manchester	2-6-0	1910	48961	ex-Boston and Maine Railroad #1491 purchased 1929
30	Baldwin Locomotive Works	0-6-0	1924	38990	ex-McKeesport Connecting Railroad #30 purchased 1949 scrapped 1953
31	Schenectady Locomotive Works	4-6-0	1899	5171	ex-Boston and Maine Railroad #2040 purchased 1929
32	Schenectady Locomotive Works	4-6-0	1898	4714	ex-Boston and Maine Railroad #2035 purchased 1930
33	ALCO Schenectady	2-8-0	1901	25052	ex-Boston and Maine Railroad #2350 purchased 1930 wrecked 1944
34	ALCO Schenectady	2-8-0	1911	49001	ex-Boston and Maine Railroad #2421 purchased 1930
35	ALCO Schenectady	2-8-0	1911	49007	ex-Boston and Maine Railroad #2427 purchased 1930 scrapped 1938
36	ALCO Schenectady	2-8-0	1910	47648	ex-Boston and Maine Railroad #2404 purchased 1932 scrapped 1949
37	ALCO Schenectady	2-8-0	1911	49005	ex-Boston and Maine Railroad #2425 purchased 1932
38	ALCO Schenectady	2-8-0	1902	25073	ex-Boston and Maine Railroad #2357 purchased 1934 wrecked 1944
39	ALCO Schenectady	2-8-0	1902	25072	ex-Boston and Maine Railroad #2356 purchased 1936
40	ALCO Schenectady	2-8-0	1911	49000	ex-Boston and Maine Railroad #2420 then Montpelier and Wells River Railroad #18 purchased 1939
41	ALCO Schenectady	2-8-0	1907	42843	ex-Boston and Maine Railroad #2388 purchased 1946 scrapped 1948
42	ALCO Schenectady	2-8-0	1910	47645	ex-Boston and Maine Railroad #2401 then Montpelier and Wells River Railroad #19 then Barre and Chelsea Railroad #19 purchased 1946
43	ALCO Schenectady	2-8-0	1910	47656	ex-Boston and Maine Railroad #2412 then Barre and Chelsea Railroad #22 purchased 1947
44	ALCO Schenectady	2-8-0	1911	49003	ex-Boston and Maine Railroad #2423 then Montpelier and Wells River Railroad #20 then Barre and Chelsea Railroad #20 purchased 1947
46	General Electric	70-ton	1948	29297	sold Montpelier and Barre Railroad 1973
47	General Electric	70-ton	1948	29298	sold Montpelier and Barre Railroad 1956
48	General Electric	70-ton	1948	29299	sold Montpelier and Barre Railroad 1973
49	General Electric	70-ton	1948	30022	scrapped 1963
50	General Electric	70-ton	1949	30184	sold Montpelier and Barre Railroad 1957
51	General Electric	70-ton	1951	30844	sold Frankfort and Cincinnati Railroad 1972
52	General Electric	70-ton	1947	29087	ex-Barre and Chelsea Railroad #13 purchased 1955 sold Montpelier and Barre Railroad 1973
53	General Electric	70-ton	1951	31168	ex-Mississippi Export Railroad #48 purchased 1958 sold 1960
54	General Electric	70-ton	1953	31724	ex-Mississippi Export Railroad #50 purchased 1958 sold Montpelier and Barre Railroad 1973
55	General Electric	70-ton	1949	30175	ex-Lakeside and Marblehead Railroad #11 purchased 1963 sold Montpelier and Barre Railroad 1973
56	General Electric	44-ton	1943	17929	ex-Carnegie-Illinois Steel Company #5 purchased 1965 sold 1966
1st #200	General Electric	70-ton	1947	29092	ex-Unadilla Valley Railroad #200 purchased 1960 scrapped 1965
2nd #200	EMD	GP9	1956	20973	ex-New York Central Railroad #5960 purchased 1967 sold 1973
201	EMD	GP9	1957	23589	ex-New York Central Railroad #6056 purchased 1967 sold 1973
202	American Locomotive Company	RS-3	1951	78937	ex-Reading Railroad #523 purchased 1968 sold Montpelier and Barre Railroad 1973
203	American Locomotive Company	RS-3	1953	80498	ex-Great Northern Railway #229 purchased 1968 sold Montpelier and Barre Railroad 1973
204	American Locomotive Company	RS-3	1950	78292	ex-Lehigh and Hudson River Railroad #4 purchased 1970
205	American Locomotive Company	RS-3	1950	78369	ex-Lehigh and Hudson River Railroad #10 purchased 1971 sold Montpelier and Barre Railroad 1973. In 1976 it was sold to the Vermont Railway as #605, and in 1984 it was sold to Batten Kill Railroad as #605.
206	American Locomotive Company	RS-3	1952	80163	ex-Delaware and Hudson Railroad #4073 purchased 1972
