= LVRT =

LVRT may refer to:

- Low-voltage ride-through, the capability of electric generators to stay connected in short periods of lower electric network voltage
- Lamoille Valley Rail Trail, a rail trail in Vermont, United States
- Lebanon Valley Rail Trail, a rail trail in Lebanon County, Pennsylvania, United States
