= Morrisville station (Vermont) =

- Morrisville Depot
- U.S. Historic district – Contributing property
- Location within Vermont Location within the United States
- Location: 10 Railroad Street; Morrisville, Vermont
- Coordinates: 44.5639704°N 72.5979658°W
- Built: 1872
- Part of: Morrisville Historic District (ID83003210)
- Designated CP: January 19, 1983

The Morrisville Depot located at 10 Depot Street (aka 10 Railroad Street) in Morrisville, Vermont, is a decommissioned historic train station. Built in 1872 to serve the Portland and Ogdensburg Railway, the depot was known as the most important train station for the Vermont lumber industry, for its decorative architectural ornament, and for housing the headquarters of the St. Johnsbury and Lamoille County Railroad from 1959 to the early 1970s. It was subsequently converted into a restaurant. The Morrisville Depot was added to the National Register of Historic Places in 1982 as building #15 in the Morrisville Historic District.

== History ==
In the beginning of the 19th century, several small towns in Vermont's Green Mountains, including Morristown, began supplying lumber from their forests. The Central Vermont Railroad was established in 1849 to transport this supply from the mountains to Burlington (the state's commercial center and a port on Lake Champlain). For their terminal they chose the relatively flat mountain township of Waterbury. This would open up new heights of demand for Morristown, located just 20 miles (32 km) away. In 1866 the speculative Mt. Mansfield Railroad Company raised $10,000 to build a line around its namesake mountain, from Waterbury to Morrisville. However, this plan fell through three years later when the Portland and Ogensburg Railroad began planning a Maine-New York throughway. On its way from Atlantic coastal New England to Lake Ontario (itself a transportation hub for the Midwest and Canada) the line could be opened to Morrisville lumber transport as long as the village agreed to build and maintain its own station and roadways.

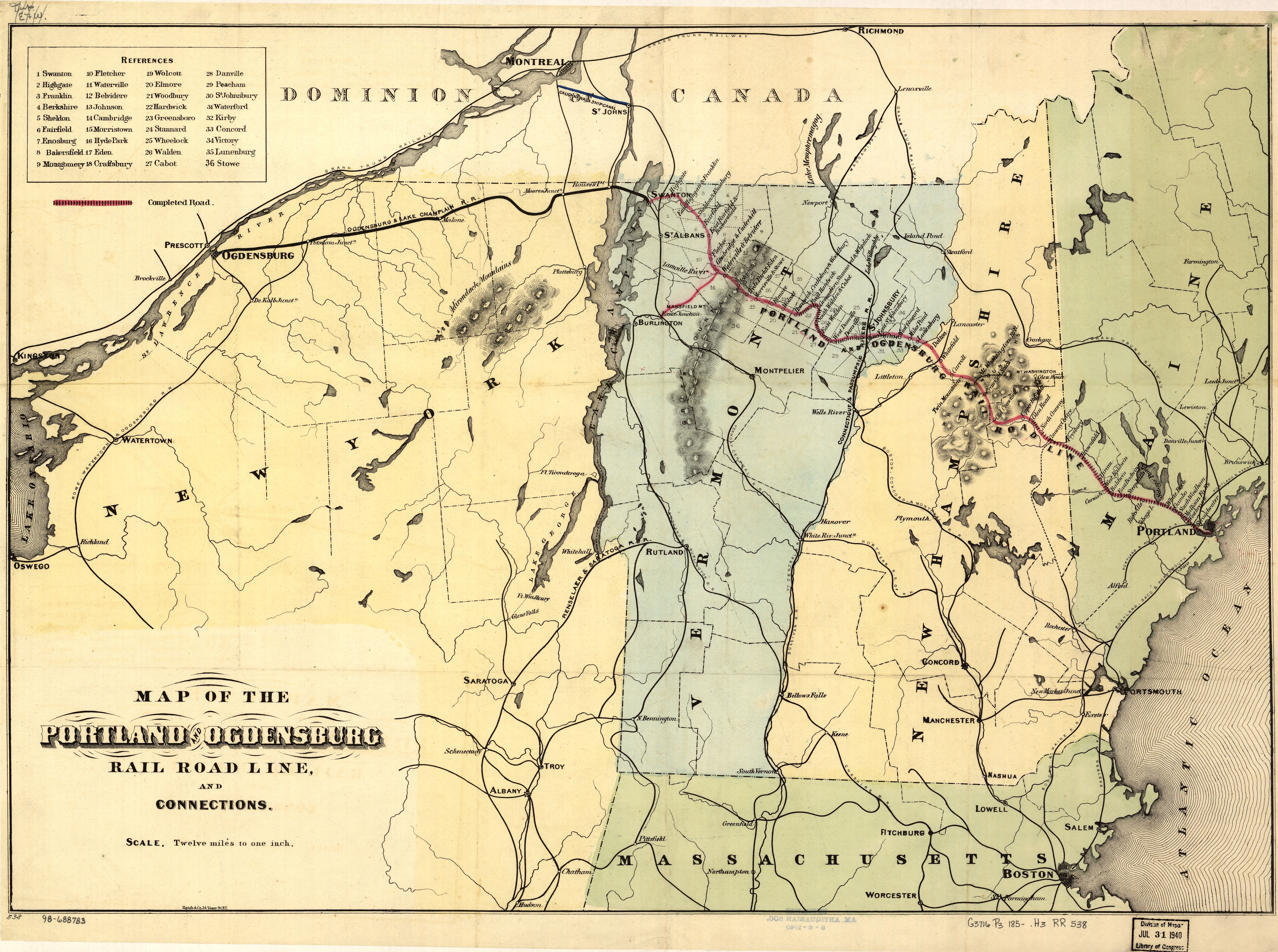
As seen on this map, the planned Portland and Ogensburg Railroad (in red) crossed the Green Mountain range north of Burlington in Lamoille County, instead of veering south to cross at the previously established Waterbury area. To not miss Burlington's economic opportunity, a rail was proposed between Cambridge and Essex Junction (located just outside of Burlington).

The rails reached Morrisville on December 31, 1872, the same year that the depot building was completed. Although the Portland and Ogdensburg's system was reorganized in 1880, by 1884 the station was popular enough to warrant a 24-by-55-foot (7.3 by 16.8 m) extension in the form of the Depot Restaurant. The Portland and Ogdensburg Railroad leased its central Vermont section of rails to the Maine Central Railroad in 1888 (who subsequently leased the line to the Boston and Maine Railroad). In 1900 a poolroom was added to the Morrisville Depot's east side. The Maine Central's lease on Morrisville's rails was held until 1927, when the Maine Central decided to renew only as far west as St. Johnsbury. Passenger railway service declined in the early 1930s, and the Depot Restaurant closed. The original Portland and Ogdensburg line (now called the St. Johnsbury-Lake Champlain Railroad Company) retook freight operations on the rails. In 1959 the company moved their headquarters into the depot. In doing so, the depot's original platform was converted into a "northern wing" to their office. Although the rails remained, the Morrisville Depot would never be used as a train station again.

== Recent history ==
In 1973 the St. Johnsbury-Lake Champlain Railroad Company was purchased by the state. Although several freight companies continued to operate on the lines, the depot was permanently converted from offices into a restaurant space. In the 1980s this restaurant was owned by the Loati family. They ran The Station Restaurant, a local landmark, until 1989. Just five years later, the freight rails were decommissioned. (No longer could diners be treated to the sight of passing freight trains.) Around this time the Morrisville Depot became an Asian restaurant, which later closed due to a fire. In 2005 the Benson family moved "Melben's" into the space.

In the early 2010s, joint efforts of the VAST Trail and the government (spearheaded by Senator Bernie Sanders) repurposed the railway path into the Lamolle Valley Rail Trail, a 93-mile-long (150 km) all-season sports and recreation pathway. The project broke ground on July 19, 2013. The Morrisville section of track, included in Phase 1B, was converted to a paved recreational path in 2014.

Also in 2014, the Morrisville Depot was purchased by its current owners Kim Kaufman and James Goldsmith. The owners were awarded over $30,000 in tax credits to rehabilitate the 144-year-old landmark.

== Chronological list of companies housed in the Morrisville Depot ==
1. The Depot Restaurant (1884–1930)
2. An unnamed poolroom (1900–?)
3. STJ&LC Railroad Company (1959–1973)
4. The Station Restaurant (early 1980s–1989)
5. Oriental Station (1990s)
6. Melben's (2005–2010)
7. 10 Railroad Street (2014–2026)

== Architecture and current use ==
Although the Morrisville Depot's blueprint was originally a simple rectangle, its ornate decorations made it a striking sight. Many of these remain today. The building's original low gable roof projects raking eaves held by trussed chamfered brackets. These are capped by triangular floral-motif panels and framed by a scroll-cut frieze that runs the length of the facade. Notably missing from the current exterior are the original decorative bargeboards, finials, half-timbered window surrounds, and a wide frieze of patterned woodwork. Over its lifetime, the building has been added to and the interior has been renovated multiple times. (Although the building's preservation meant encasing some of the original brick walls, the building's main south-facing facade has remained relatively untouched since 1900.) The original building and platform contain the entryway and dining room of the 10 Railroad Street restaurant. The 1884 addition houses the restaurant's bar. The turn of the century poolroom addition was previously a separate specialty grocery store and growler fill shop but has been reconnected to the main depot building.
