= Morrisville Historic District =

Morrisville Historic District may refer to:

- Morrisville Historic District (Morrisville, North Carolina), listed on the National Register of Historic Places in Wake County, North Carolina
- Morrisville Historic District (Morristown, Vermont), listed on the National Register of Historic Places in Lamoille County, Vermont
