= Greensboro Depot =

Greensboro Depot may refer to:

- Greensboro Depot (Greensboro, Georgia), listed on the National Register of Historic Places in Greene County, Georgia
- Greensboro Depot (Greensboro Bend, Vermont), listed on the National Register of Historic Places in Orleans County, Vermont
