= Johnson station =

- Johnson Railroad Depot
- U.S. National Register of Historic Places
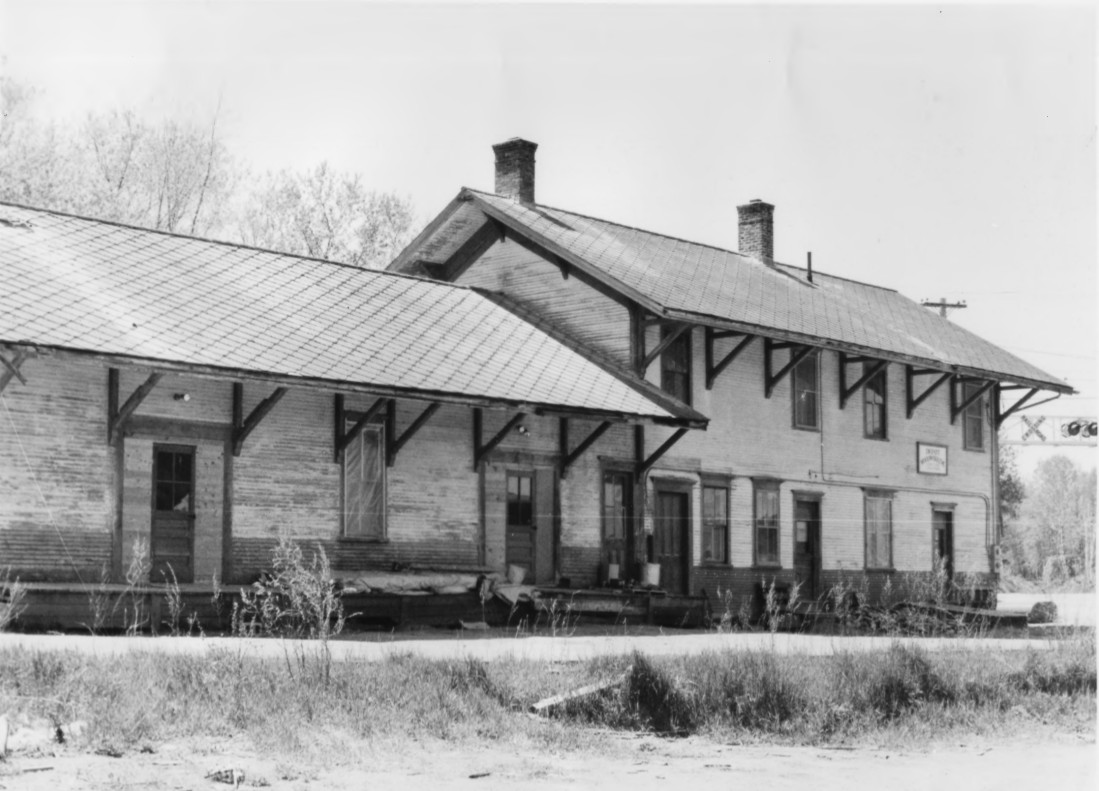
- photo, 1980

- Location within Vermont Location within the United States
- Location: Railroad St., Johnson, Vermont
- Coordinates: 44°37′52″N 72°41′15″W
- Area: less than one acre
- Built: 1887
- Architectural style: Stick/eastlake
- NRHP reference No.: 80000336
- Added to NRHP: November 28, 1980

The Johnson Railroad Depot was a historic former railroad station on Railroad Street in Johnson, Vermont. Built in 1887, it was an excellent example of Victorian railroad architecture, serving as a gateway for the town's industrial products to markets nationwide. Converted to commercial use after rail service was discontinued on the line, it was listed on the National Register of Historic Places in 1980. It has since been demolished; a modern building stands where it used to.

== Description and history ==
The Johnson Railroad Depot stood on the south side of Railroad Street south of the village of Johnson, opposite its junction with Creamery Road. It was a long rectangular two-story structure, oriented parallel to the right of way of railroad tracks built by the Saint Johnsbury and Lamoille County Railroad, now occupied by the Lamoille Valley Rail Trail. The depot had a long single-story gable-roofed section, and a shorter two-story section, which housed the stationmaster's quarters on the second floor. Common features of these sections include large Stick style brackets on extended eaves, and projecting cornices above the doors and windows. A square telegrapher's bay projected from the two-story section on the track side. At the time of its listing on the National Register in 1980, it was still in use as a freight depot, and retained most of its original interior fixtures.

The St. Johnsbury and Lamoille introduced service to Johnson in 1872, the year its first station was built. This depot was built in 1887 as a replacement for that one. The station was an important part of the local economy, because most of the area's industrial products and goods were shipped to market via the railroad. The depot has apparently been demolished; a modern single-story building now stands at its location.

== See also ==
- National Register of Historic Places listings in Lamoille County, Vermont
