= Greensboro station (Vermont) =

- Greensboro Depot
- U.S. National Register of Historic Places
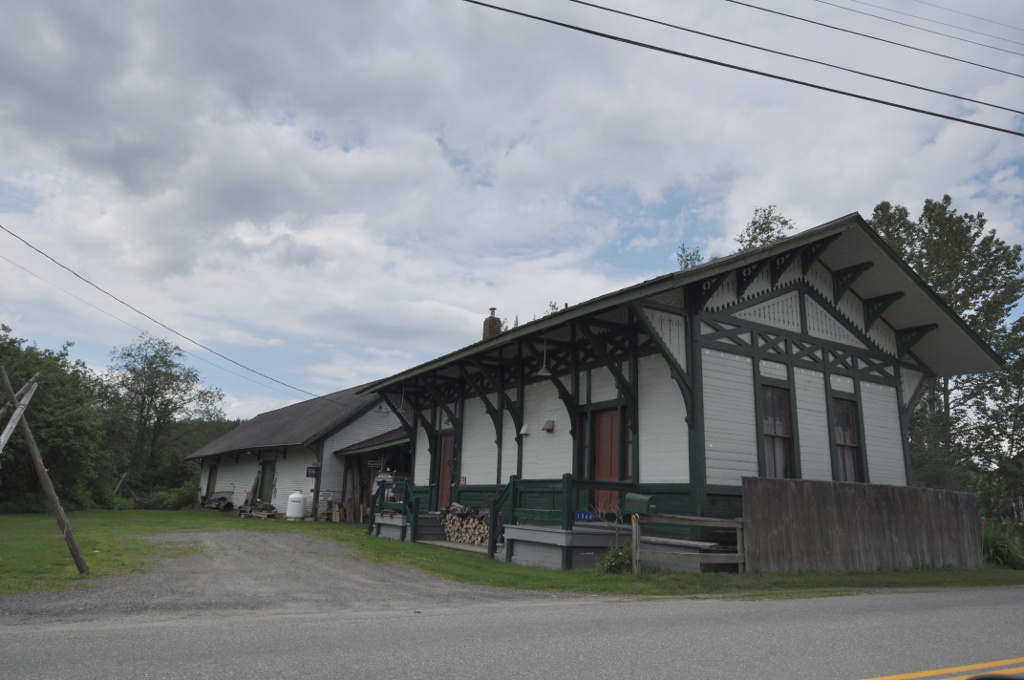

- Location within Vermont Location within the United States
- Location: W side of Main St. at R.R. track jct., Greensboro Bend, Vermont
- Coordinates: 44°32′47″N 72°15′53″W
- Area: less than one acre
- Built: 1872
- Architectural style: Stick/eastlake
- NRHP reference No.: 75000144
- Added to NRHP: April 21, 1975

The Greensboro Depot is a historic railroad station on Main Street in the village of Greensboro Bend, Vermont. Built about 1872 by the Portland and Ogdensburg Railroad, it is a well-preserved example of that railroad's early station designs, and a reminder of the village's historic association with the railroad. It was listed on the National Register of Historic Places in 1975.

== Description and history ==
The former Greensboro Depot buildings are located in southernmost Greensboro, on the west side of Main Street between it and the Lamoille River. It is set just south of the former railroad right-of-way of the Saint Johnsbury and Lake Champlain Railroad (a later reorganization of the Portland and Ogdensburg), at the northernmost point of what was known as the "Greensboro Bend" in its main line between Saint Johnsbury and Hardwick. There are two buildings, oriented perpendicular to the roadway. The passenger station is set closest to the road, and is the most architecturally elaborate. It is a single-story wood-frame structure, with a gabled roof that has elongated eaves. Its main decorative features are extensive Stick style applied woodwork beneath the eaves, and delicate jigsawn woodwork at the gable ends, including pieces set in the large brackets that support the roof. The freight station, set just west of the passenger station, is a much more modestly decorated structure of similar size, without the deep eaves, but with simpler decorative brackets.

The station was built by the Portland and Ogdensburg about 1872, year service opened between St. Johnsbury and Hardwick. The station gave the village of Greensboro Bend its name, because of the large semicircular loop built in the line to serve Greensboro. The rail line was acquired by the state in 1973 (and is now a multi-use trail), and the buildings have been repurposed.

== See also ==
- National Register of Historic Places listings in Orleans County, Vermont
