= Chris Andrews (entrepreneur) =

Pioneer/digital media/electronic publishing/Internet

Chris Clinton Andrews
- Born: August 13, 1956; Morrisville, Vermont
- Died: June 13, 2012 (aged 55); Los Altos, California
- Education: Escondido Elementary School; Terman Junior High School; Henry M. Gunn Senior High School; Foothill College - transferred to University of Utah; University of Utah - 2 years (1976-1978); University of San Francisco - Bachelor of Science in Information Systems Management; John F. Kennedy University - Masters Program in Organizational Psychology
- Known for: IT pioneer
- Notable work: The Education of a CD-ROM Publisher - An Insider's History of Electronic Publishing

Chris Andrews (August 13, 1956 - June 13, 2012) was an entrepreneur who worked with digital media, electronic publishing, and the Internet. He was the first CD-ROM producer, launched the first CD-Recordable system which began the "user generated content" revolution. He developed technologies in other areas including live webcasting, use of audio and video on the internet, and intellectual property.

Andrews was the author of "The Education of a CD-ROM Publisher - An Insiders History of Electronic Publishing."

Andrews' story was featured in a profile on CBS' 60 Minutes. In 2001, he began to pursue the restitution of a building in Vienna, Austria that was taken from his family by the Nazis in World War II. This became a life-changing experience for him, making him an activist in particular in World War II restitution.

Chris also worked at Hewlett-Packard, NewsBank, Meridian Data, and the National Academy of Recording Arts & Sciences. He launched several companies including the webcast software company Livecast, the multimedia publishing company UniDisc, and VentureMakers LLC - an intellectual property development company.

== Resources ==
- E-commerce patent which Chris Andrews authored
- Article in CMP publications naming Chris Andrews as a Digital Media Pioneer
- Articles from Grammy Program Book about Chris Andrews work as Executive Producer of the Grammy Webcast

=== Articles about Chris Andrews and World War II restitution ===
- Buried In The Past, Brothers Discover Long-Lost Family In Austria
- Spectrum
- English Translation of Chris, du gehst zu weit
- A STEP AHEAD OF HIS TIME
- Two Brothers' Saga of Privilege, Catastrophe, Nazi Humiliation, Suicide and Redemption
- Trying to reclaim a former life
- Palo Alto natives unearth their true heritage
