= Dewey K. Hickok =

Dewey K. Hickok of Morrisville, Vermont was an inventor and a dealer of patent rights. On July 19, 1887, he received a patent for his new invention, a washing machine.

Hickok was mechanically creative and invented numerous machines, including a clothes dryer in addition to his washing machine.

Hickok was related to Wild Bill Hickok (distant cousins?) and went on two long whaling voyages in the Pacific Ocean. The following is extracted from the detailed sailors log he kept on his voyages. This log documents the taking of the whales with dates and locations of kills, as well as a rich narrative of areas visited. His journeys spanned the entire Pacific from Kamchatka to New Zealand and the islands in between. The original log was donated to the Morrisville Historical Society. His first voyage was aboard the whaler Superior of New London, CT. which set sail on Tuesday, Sept. 27, 1842. This voyage lasted over 2 1/2 years. The second voyage was aboard the whaler Isaak Walton of New London, CT, which set sail on Tuesday, October 8, 1844, bound for the east coast of Asia. Master: Daniel Fitch. The ship returned to New London on May 24, 1847, with 3.030 barrels of whale oil, also a 2 1/2 year voyage.

Whale oil taken aboard the Isaak Walton:

- First season, 1845= 12 whales made and 1,300 barrels.
- Second season, 1846= 29 whales made and 1,825 barrels.
- 125 barrels lost to leakage.
- 2 Sperm whales made 30 barrels.
- Total cargo= 3,030 barrels.
- "Cut in 38 whale during the voyage. Sank 8. Struck 80.
- Struck 32 the first season, saved 10, sunk 4, picked up 2.
- Struck 48 whale second season, saved 25, sunk 4, picked up 1."
