= Morrisville Historic District (Morristown, Vermont) =

Historic district in Vermont, United States

- U.S. National Register of Historic Places
- U.S. Historic district
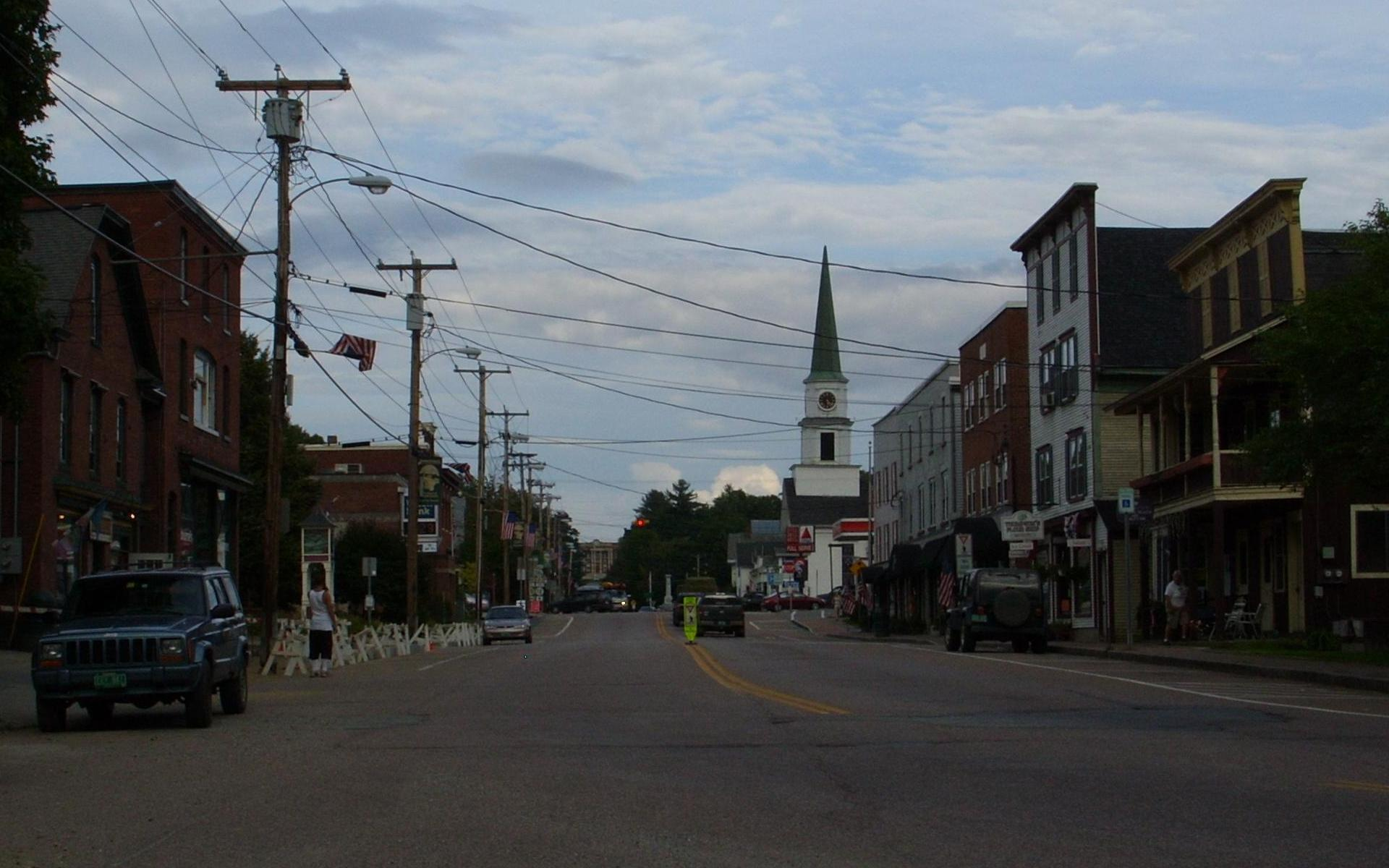

- Location within Vermont Location within the United States
- Location: Portland, Main, Railroad and Foundry Sts., Morristown, Vermont
- Coordinates: 44°33′45″N 72°35′59″W
- Area: 25 acres (10 ha) (original size); 13.3 acres (5.4 ha) (size of 2007 increase)
- Architectural style: Mid 19th Century Revival, Federal
- NRHP reference No.: 83003210 (original); 07000196 (increase)

Significant dates
- Added to NRHP: January 19, 1983
- Boundary increase: March 21, 2007

The Morrisville Historic District encompasses most of the historic commercial downtown area of the village of Morrisville in Morristown, Vermont. Developed in the early 19th century as a service town for the surrounding agricultural areas, it was transformed into a major service regional commercial center by the arrive of the railroad in 1872. Its surviving architecture is largely reflective of these two time periods. It was listed on the National Register of Historic Places in 1983, and enlarged in 2007.

== Description and history ==
The beginnings of the village of Morrisville are in 1798, when John Safford erected a sawmill on the Lamoille River, which marks the northern extent of the village. By the mid-19th century, the village was a service center for farms in the surrounding hills, with shops and tradesmen. Most of these services were arrayed on what is now Lower Main Street, running east–west between High and Portland Streets. Portland Street was laid out in anticipation of the railroad's arrival, with service begun in 1872. This inaugurated a commercial building boom on that street. The areas to the east of this commercial and industrial area developed as residential neighborhoods.

When first listed on the National Register in 1983, the district included primarily commercial properties on Lower Main Street and Portland Street, with a few Federal period houses on Main Street. In 2007 it was substantially enlarged, to also include more railroad-related industry and residential areas to the east. The commercial architecture is diverse, with that of the post-railroad boom period primarily in brick Italianate style. The expanded district, in addition to a variety of period housing, includes four historic churches and two historic school buildings. One of the two school buildings, the Peoples Academy, is separately listed on the National Register.

== See also ==
- Morrisville station (Vermont)
- National Register of Historic Places listings in Lamoille County, Vermont
