= Missisquoi Valley Rail Trail =

Rail trail in Vermont, United States

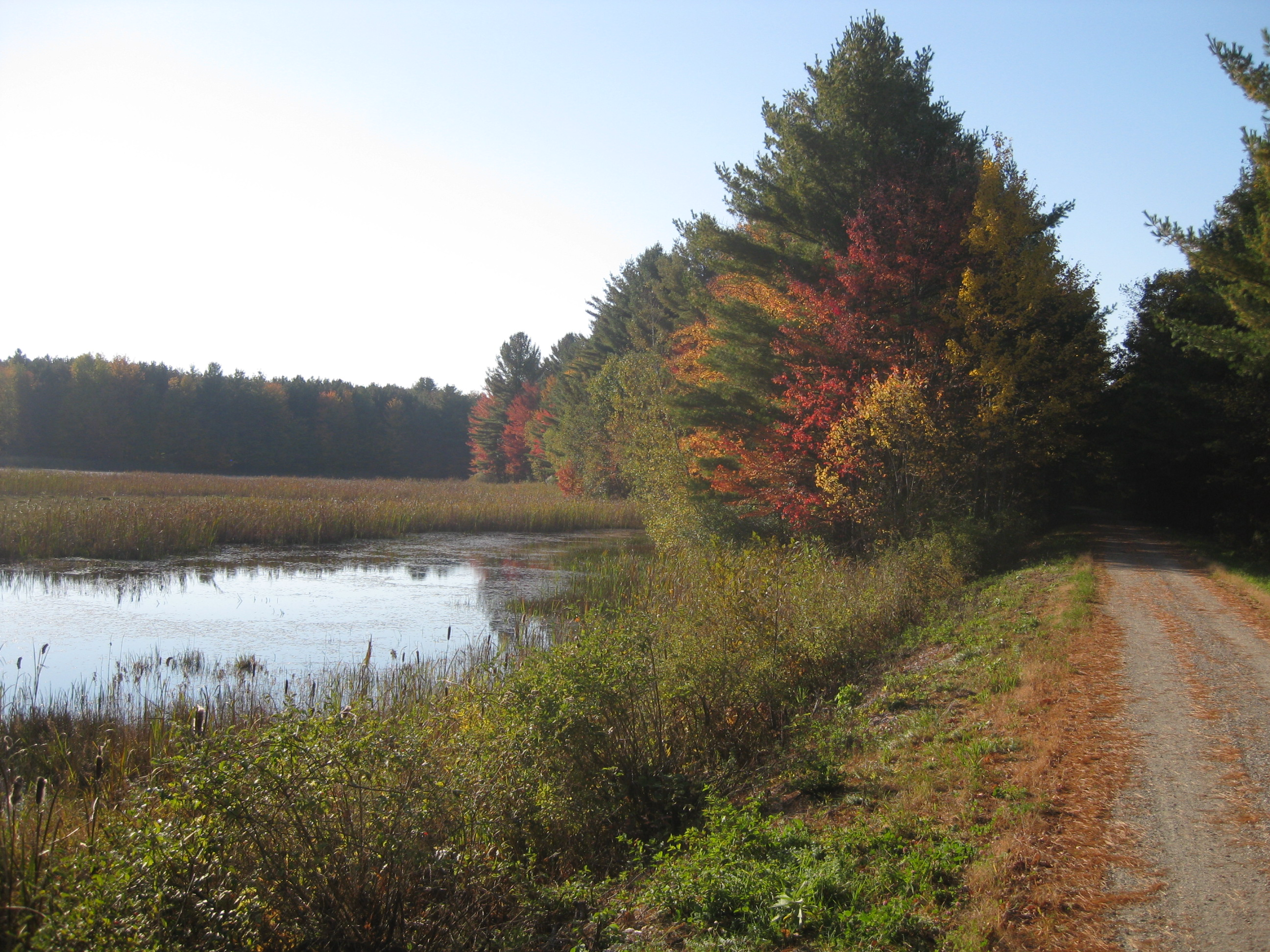
- Swanton Wetlands
- Length: 26.1 mi (42.0 km)
- Location: Franklin County, Vermont
- Trailheads: St. Albans City; 44°49′31″N 73°04′50″W; Richford; 44°59′20″N 72°40′07″W
- Use: Multi-use
- Difficulty: Easy
- Season: Year-round
- Hazards: at-grade road crossings; occasional cows

The Missisquoi Valley Rail Trail (MVRT) is a rail trail in northwestern Vermont. The trail is owned by the State of Vermont and maintained by the Department of Forest, Parks, and Recreation, the Vermont Agency of Transportation, and volunteers. The Northwest Vermont Rail Trail Council advises the State on management and use issues. Only non-motorized uses are permitted with the exception of snowmobiles, motorized wheelchairs, and maintenance vehicles. Motorbikes, ATVs, and ORVs are not permitted on the trail.

The MVRT spans 26.1 miles (42 km) from St. Albans City to Richford, passing through the towns of Swanton, Fairfield, Sheldon, Enosburg and Berkshire. The trail passes through forest, farmland and several villages, including Sheldon Springs, Sheldon Junction, Enosburg Falls, and East Berkshire. With a crushed limestone surface, it parallels the Missisquoi River along much of the eastern portion, and never exceeds a grade of three percent. The trail intersects with the Lamoille Valley Rail Trail at Sheldon Junction.

The Central Vermont Railway's Richford Branch was built during the 1870s as the Missisquoi Railroad. In June 1984 a derailment damaged a bridge over the Missisquoi River at Sheldon Junction and was not repaired. Limited operations continued on either side of the river, until the western section was abandoned in 1990 and the eastern in 1992.

Work on the trail began in the fall of 1994 and was completed the following year, except for the damaged bridge at Sheldon Junction, which was not repaired until October 2002.

The MVRT was chosen by Rails-to-Trails Conservancy as its Trail of the Month for March 2003.

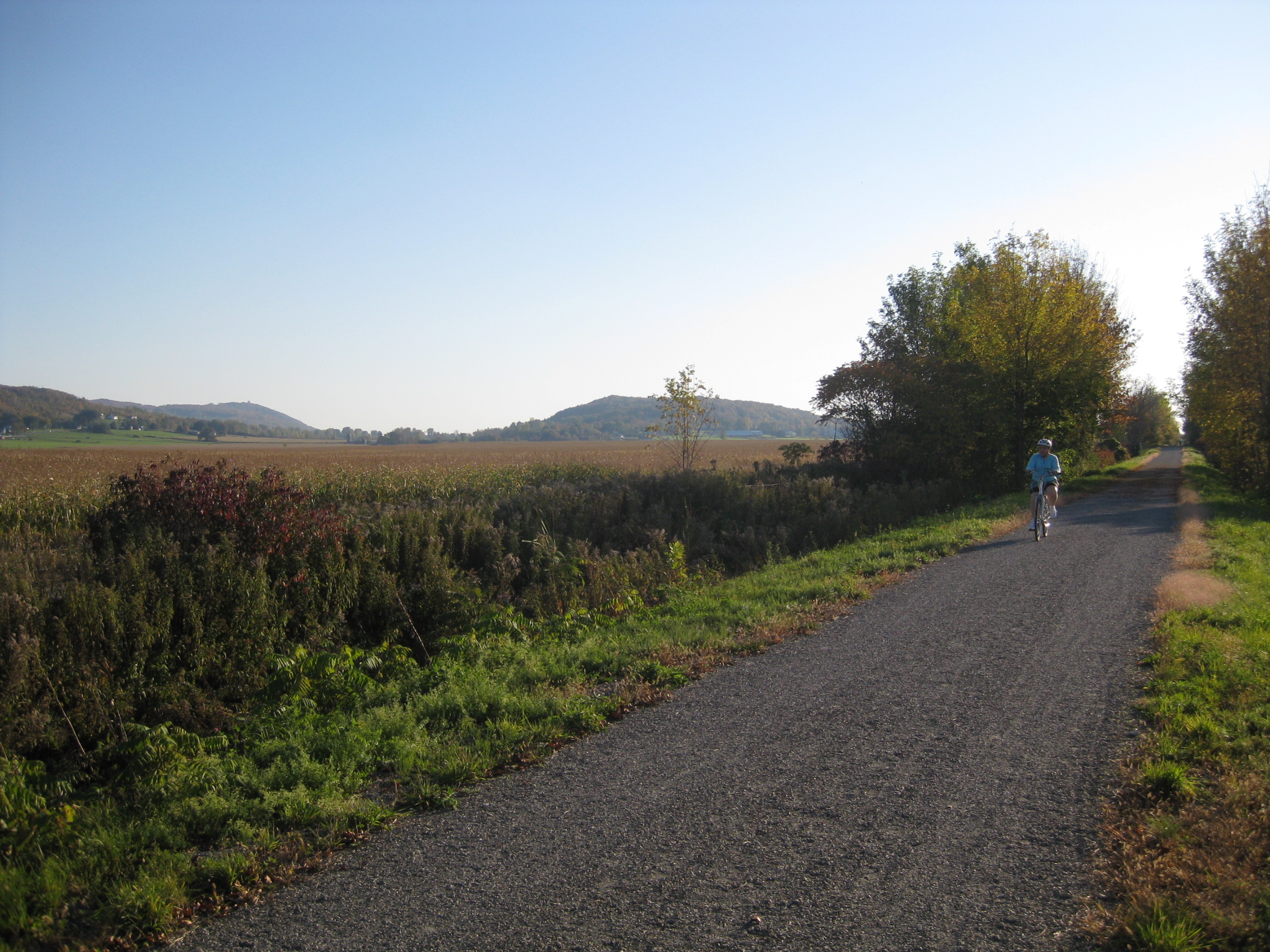

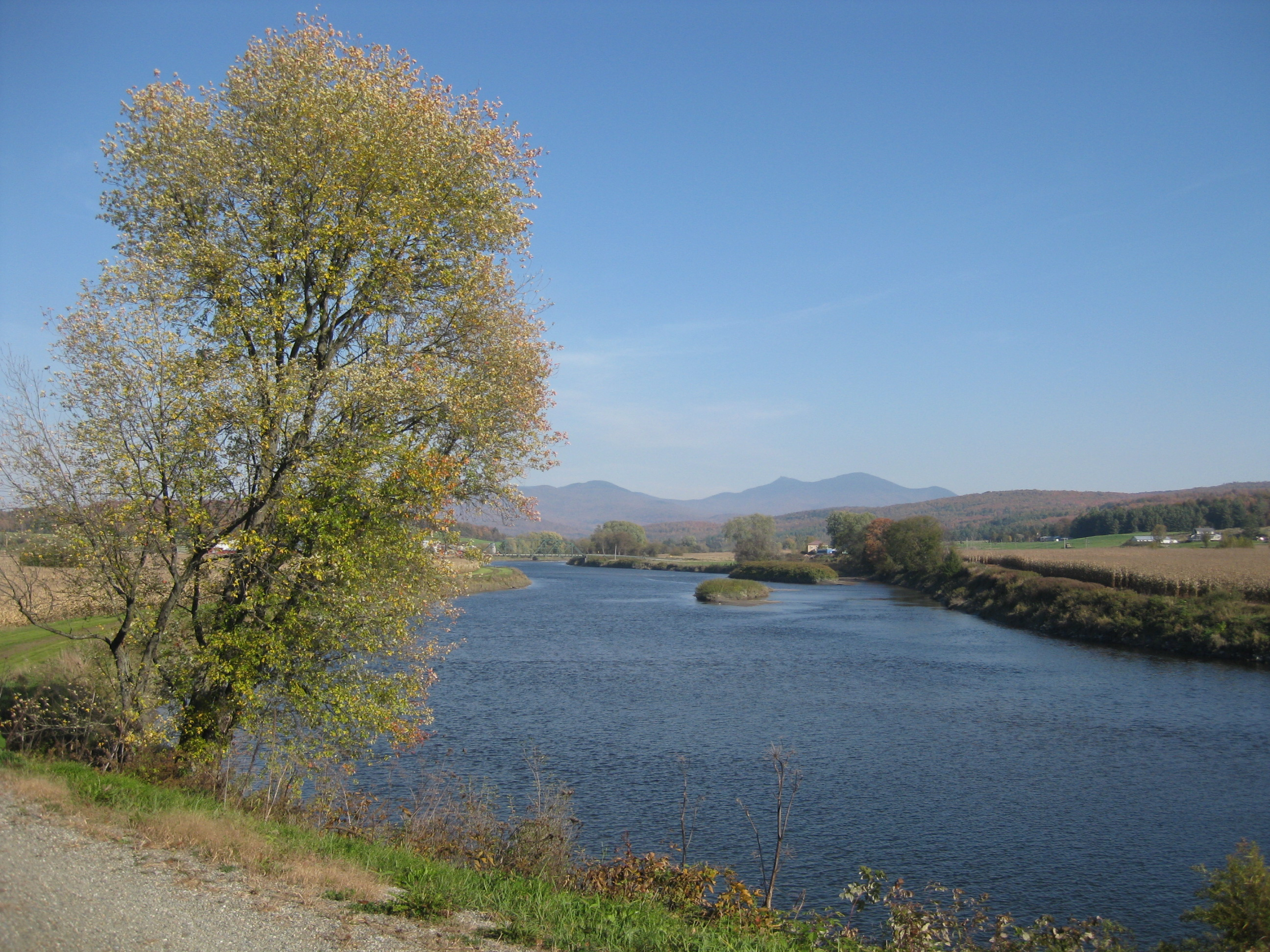

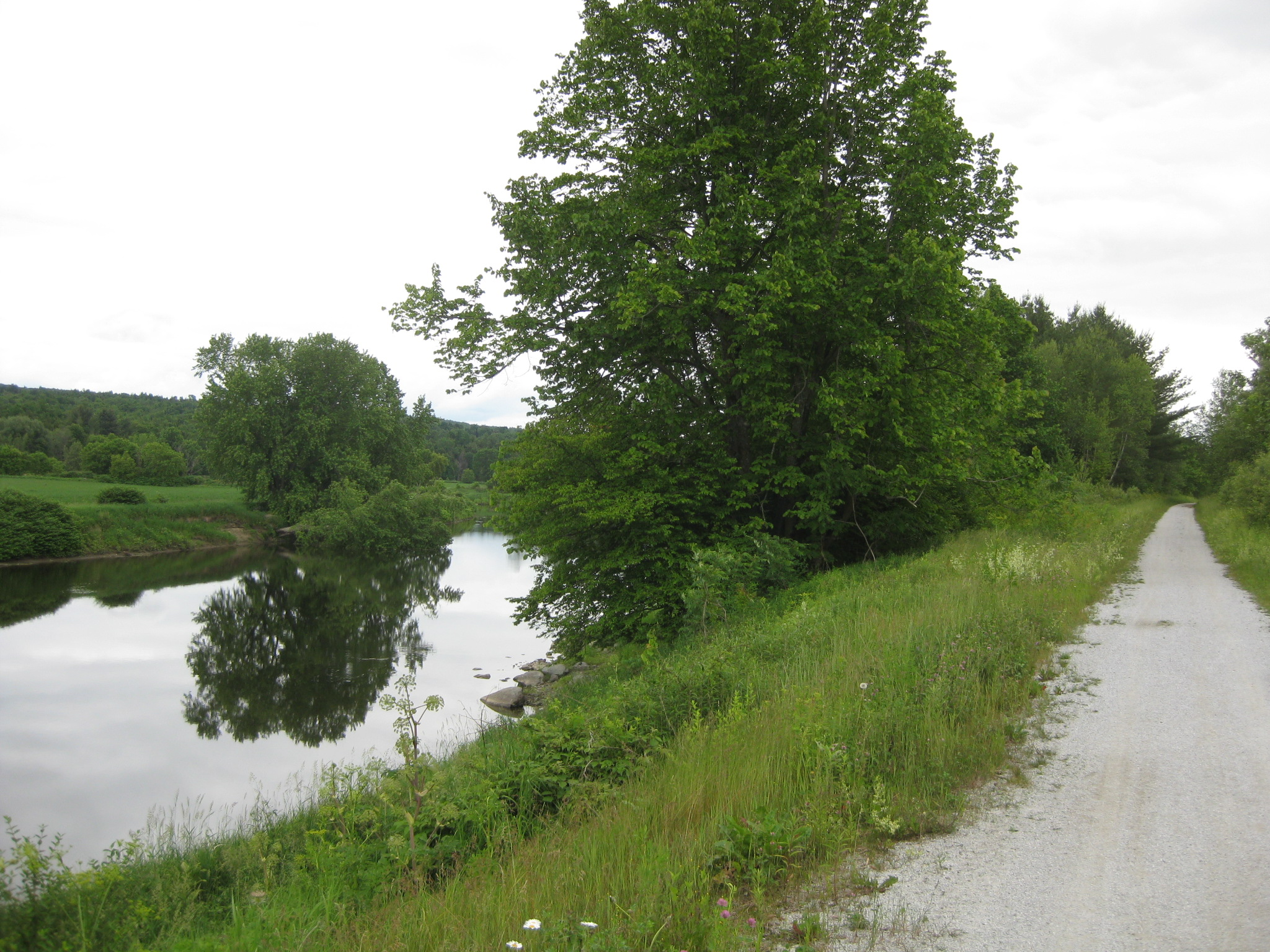

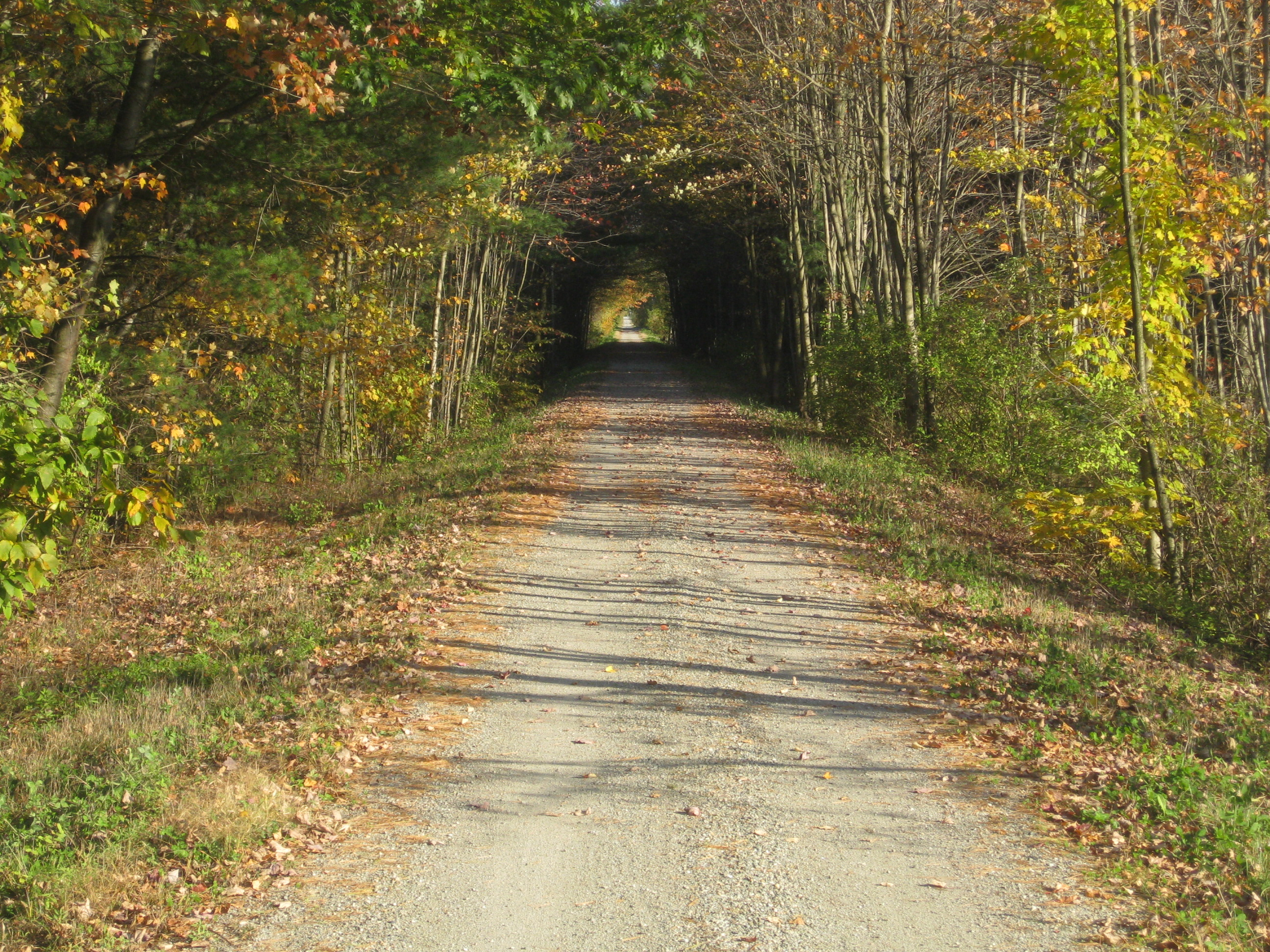

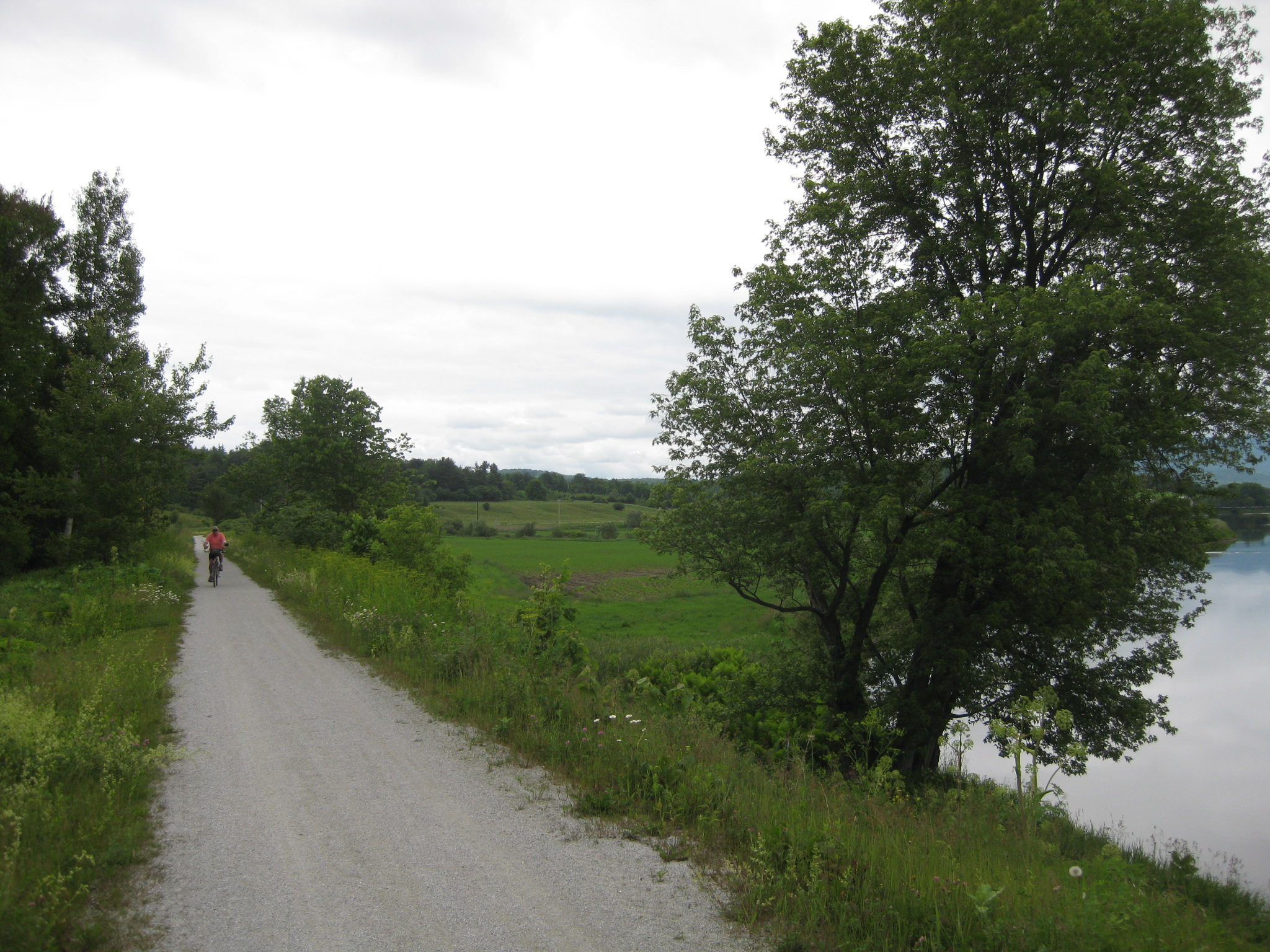

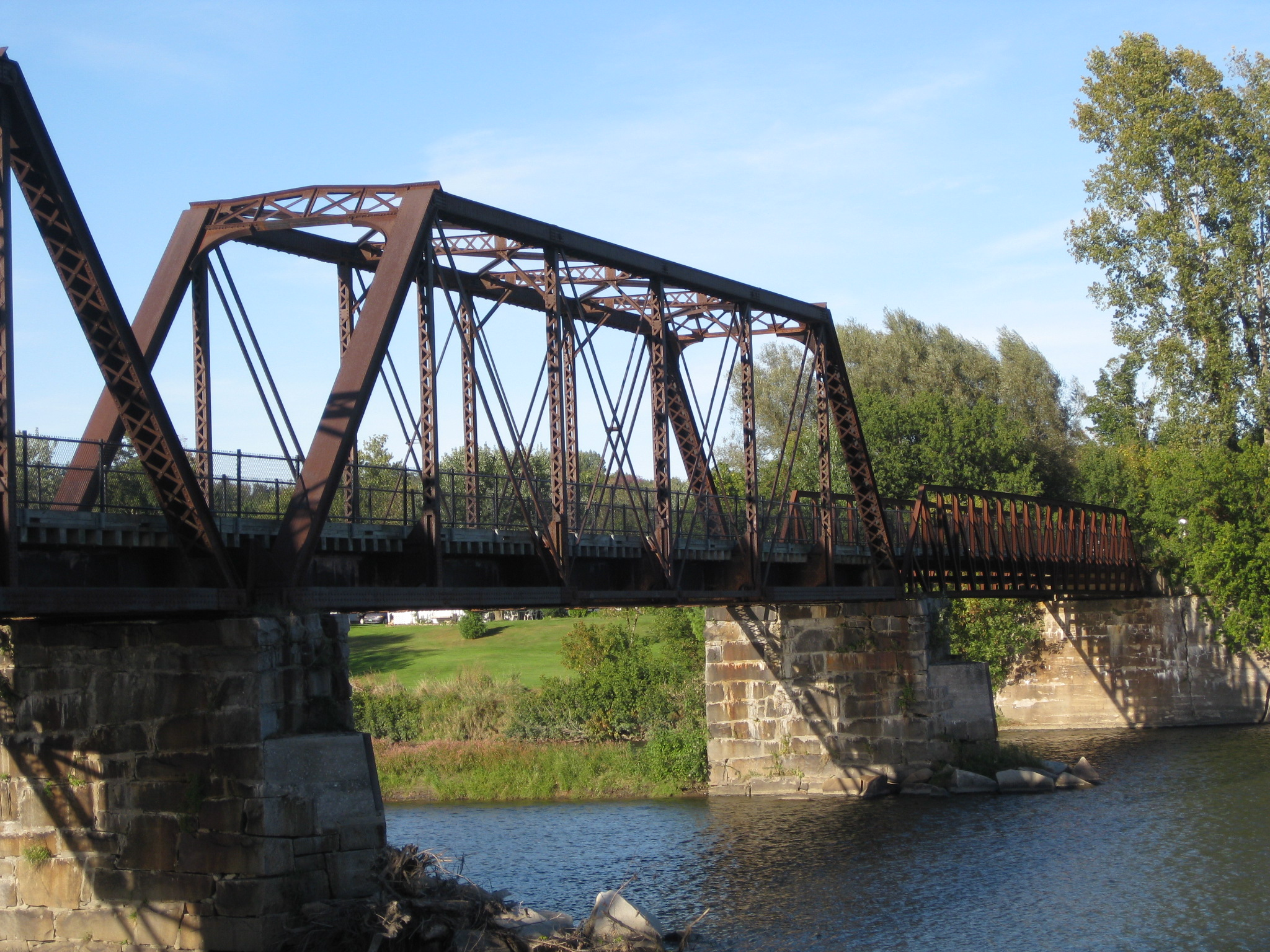
