= Morrisville, Vermont =

- Village
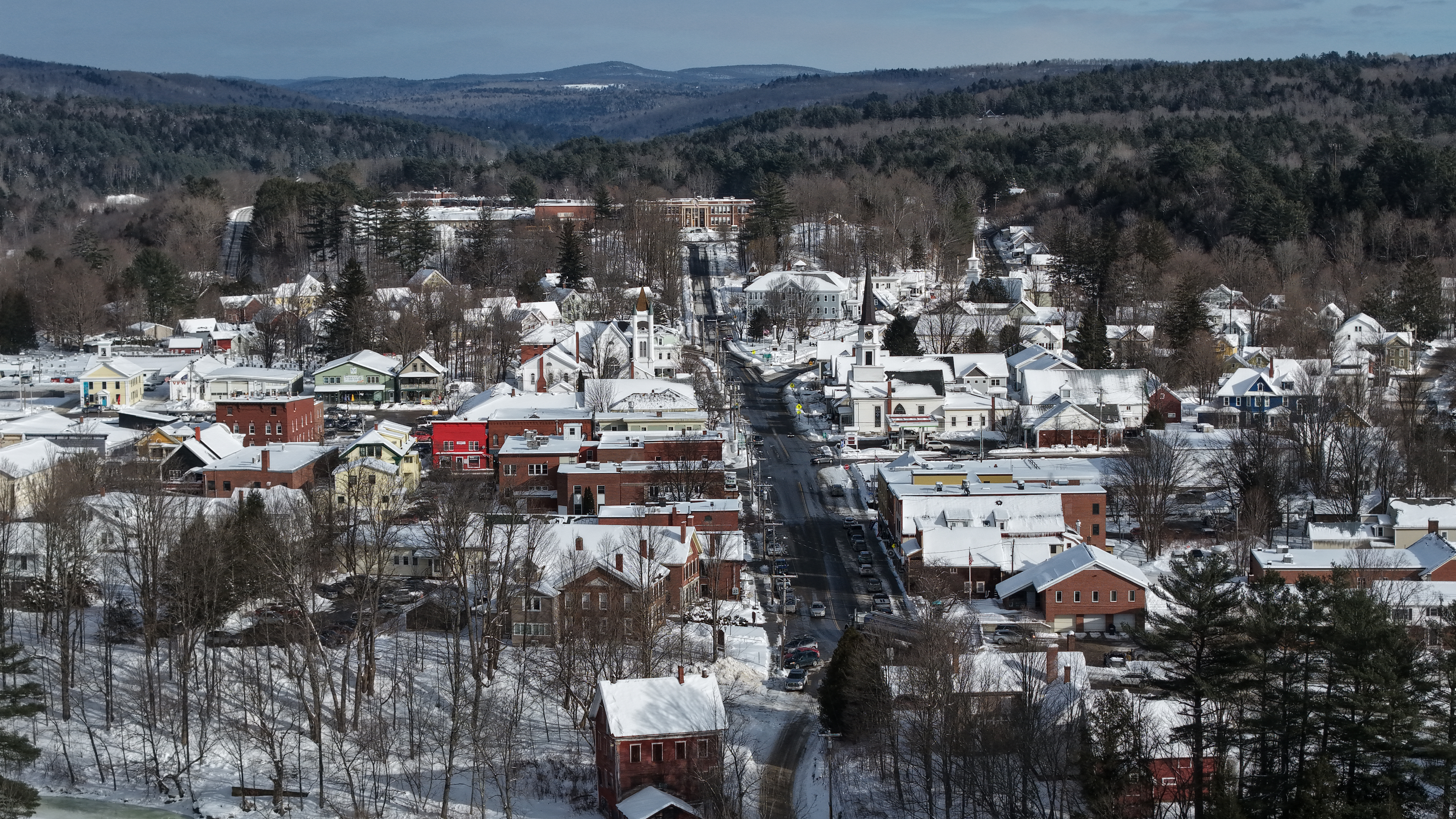
- Morrisville, VT, from the west

- Location in Vermont Location in the United States
- Coordinates: 44°33′30″N 72°35′36″W
- Country: United States
- State: Vermont
- County: Lamoille
- Town: Morristown

Area
  - Total: 2.02 sq mi (5.24 km^{2})
  - Land: 1.95 sq mi (5.06 km^{2})
  - Water: 0.069 sq mi (0.18 km^{2})
- Elevation: 682 ft (208 m)

Population (2020)
  - Total: 2,086
  - Density: 1,070/sq mi (412/km^{2})
- Time zone: UTC−5 (Eastern (EST))
  - Summer (DST): UTC−4 (EDT)
- ZIP Codes: 05661
- Area code: 802
- FIPS code: 50-46825
- GNIS feature ID: 2378316

Morrisville is a village in the town of Morristown, Lamoille County, Vermont, United States. As of the 2020 census, the village population was 2,086. Morrisville has two country clubs, a hospital, a school featuring Greek architecture and an airport. Morrisville is the headquarters for Union Bank and Concept2.

== History ==
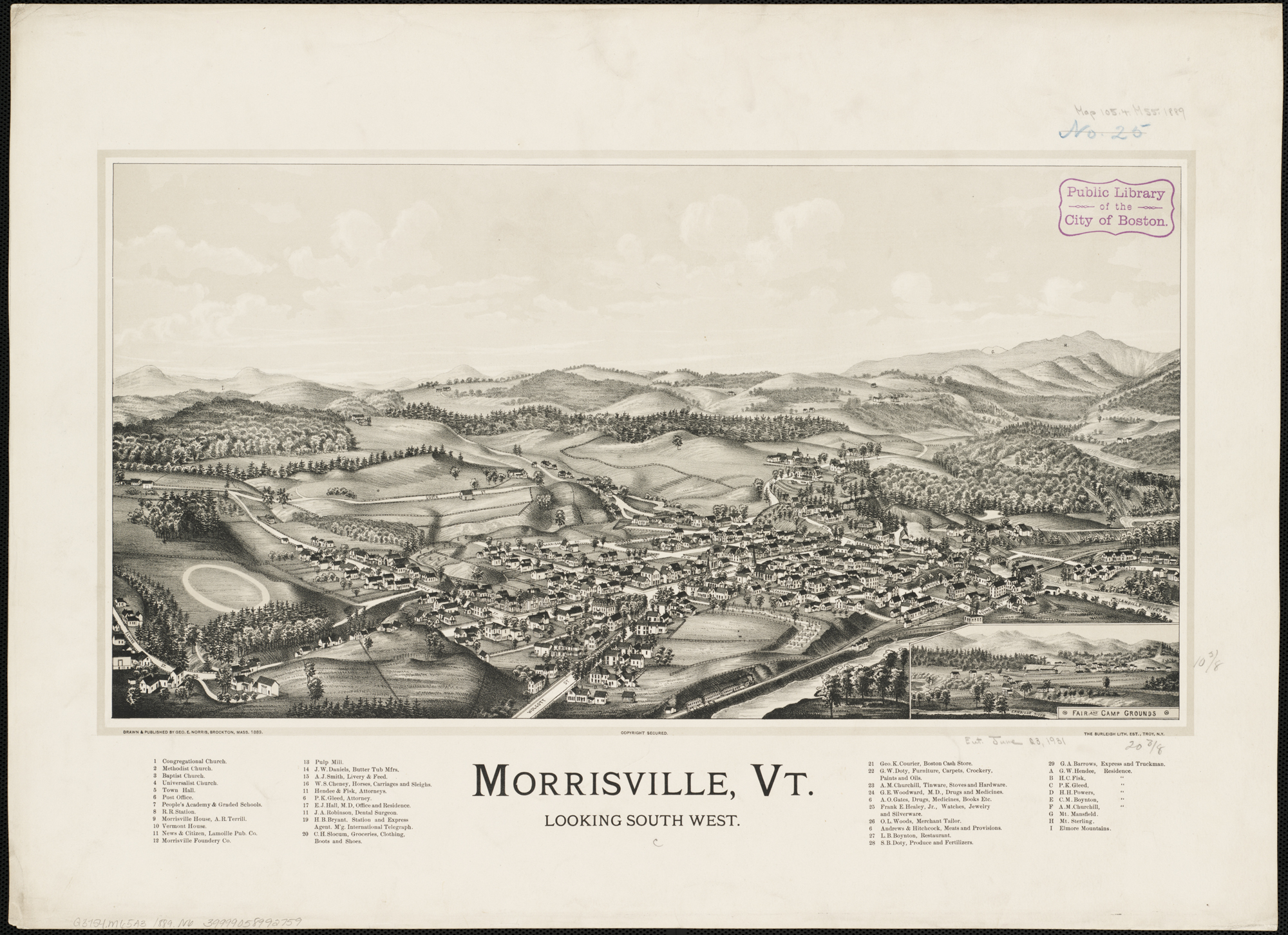
Morrisville, Vermont in 1889

Morrisville was settled in 1798. The Morrisville Historic District is listed in the National Register of Historic Places. The hospital and one of the country clubs are named after Alexander Copley, a philanthropist who donated much of the money for their construction. Copley also donated a large sum of money for the construction of the town's high school that is currently called Peoples Academy.

== Geography ==
Morrisville is in the northeastern part of the town of Morristown, slightly southeast of the center of Lamoille County. The village is on both sides of the Lamoille River, with the village center on the south side. It is 3 miles (5 km) southeast of Hyde Park, the county seat, 13 miles (21 km) northwest of Hardwick, and 9 miles (14 km) northeast of Stowe.

According to the United States Census Bureau, the Morrisville has a total area of 2.02 square miles (5.24 km^{2}), of which 1.95 square miles (5.06 km^{2}) are land and 0.07 square miles (0.18 km^{2}), or 3.42%, are water.

== Climate ==
This climatic region is typified by large seasonal temperature differences, with warm to hot (and often humid) summers and cold (sometimes severely cold) winters. According to the Köppen Climate Classification system, Morrisville has a humid continental climate, abbreviated "Dfb" on climate maps.

Climate data for Morrisville 4 SSW, Vermont, 1991–2020 normals: 760 ft (230 m)
Month	Jan	Feb	Mar	Apr	May	Jun	Jul	Aug	Sep	Oct	Nov	Dec	Year
Mean daily maximum °F (°C)	24.7 (−4.1)	27.8 (−2.3)	36.5 (2.5)	50.5 (10.3)	64.5 (18.1)	72.6 (22.6)	77.2 (25.1)	76.3 (24.6)	69.2 (20.7)	55.4 (13.0)	42.2 (5.7)	30.6 (−0.8)	52.3 (11.3)
Daily mean °F (°C)	13.9 (−10.1)	15.7 (−9.1)	25.0 (−3.9)	38.6 (3.7)	51.1 (10.6)	60.7 (15.9)	65.4 (18.6)	63.7 (17.6)	56.8 (13.8)	44.6 (7.0)	32.9 (0.5)	21.4 (−5.9)	40.8 (4.9)
Mean daily minimum °F (°C)	3.2 (−16.0)	3.6 (−15.8)	13.5 (−10.3)	26.7 (−2.9)	37.7 (3.2)	48.9 (9.4)	53.7 (12.1)	51.1 (10.6)	44.4 (6.9)	33.8 (1.0)	23.7 (−4.6)	12.1 (−11.1)	29.4 (−1.5)
Average precipitation inches (mm)	2.66 (68)	2.59 (66)	2.79 (71)	3.06 (78)	3.80 (97)	3.57 (91)	4.61 (117)	4.38 (111)	3.65 (93)	4.31 (109)	3.64 (92)	3.17 (81)	42.23 (1,074)
Average snowfall inches (cm)	21.9 (56)	21.6 (55)	21.8 (55)	4.7 (12)	0.0 (0.0)	0.0 (0.0)	0.0 (0.0)	0.0 (0.0)	0.0 (0.0)	0.8 (2.0)	8.4 (21)	25.0 (64)	104.2 (265)
Source: NOAA (1981-2010 precip/snowfall)

== Demographics ==
Historical population
Census	Pop.	Note	%±
1900	1,262		—
1910	1,445		14.5%
1920	1,707		18.1%
1930	1,822		6.7%
1940	1,967		8.0%
1950	1,995		1.4%
1960	2,047		2.6%
1970	2,116		3.4%
1980	2,074		−2.0%
1990	1,984		−4.3%
2000	2,009		1.3%
2010	1,958		−2.5%
2020	2,086		6.5%
U.S. Decennial Census

As of the census of 2020, the population was 2,086 with 898 households. There were 1,123 housing units.

== Culture ==
The Vermont Wild of the Federal Hockey League played out of Morrisville's Green Mountain Arena in the 2011–12 season, but they suspended operations after approximately two weeks. The Wild were the first professional hockey team to play in Vermont.

== Points of interest ==
- Noyes House Museum
- Morrisville Depot

== Education ==
- Morristown Elementary School
- Peoples Academy Middle Level
- Peoples Academy High School
- Bishop Marshall School—A private Catholic school accepting families of all faiths
- Community College of Vermont

== Media ==
The News and Citizen is a weekly newspaper published since 1881. It was purchased in 2015 by the owners of the Stowe Reporter, who then created the Vermont Community Newspaper Group in January 2019.

== Notable people ==
- Chris Andrews, IT pioneer
- Frederick G. Fleetwood, U.S. congressman
- John Fusco, Hollywood screenwriter, author, and TV series creator
- Dewey K. Hickok, inventor of the washing machine
- Saudia LaMont, state legislator
- Alban J. Parker, Vermont Attorney General
- Clifton G. Parker, Vermont Attorney General
- George M. Powers, Chief Justice of the Vermont Supreme Court
- H. Henry Powers, U.S. congressman
- Martha L. Poland Thurston (1849–1898), social leader, philanthropist, writer
- Maria von Trapp, inspiration for The Sound of Music; died in Morrisville (March 28, 1987)
