= St. Johnsbury, Vermont =

- Town
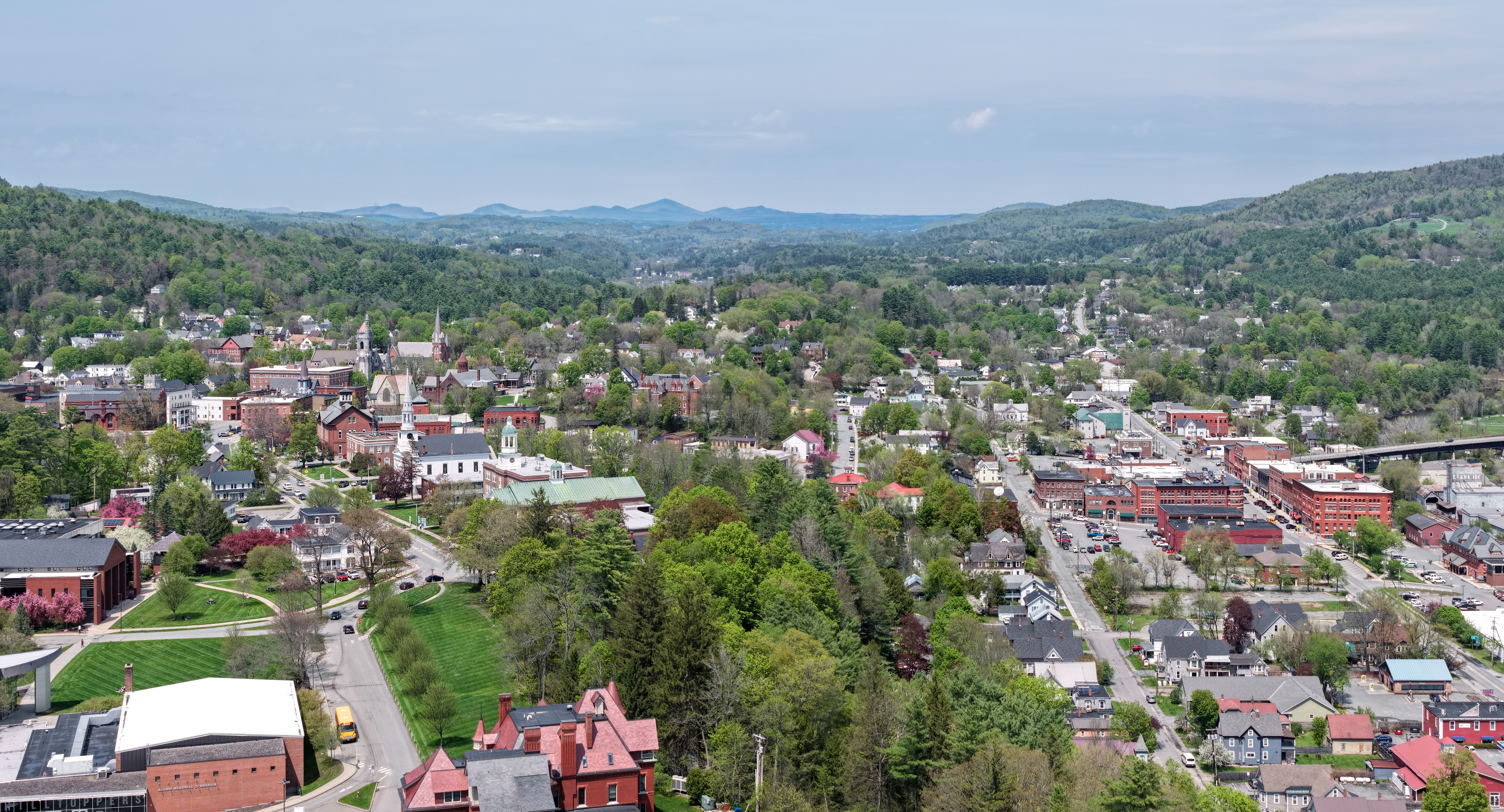
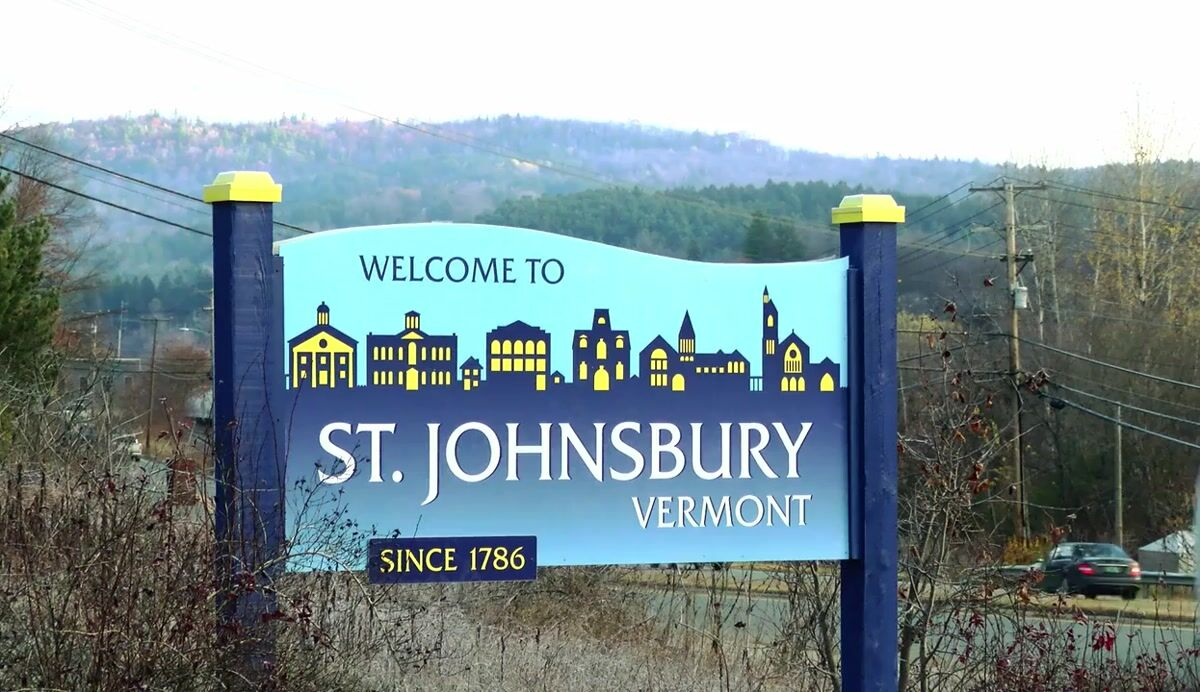
- St. Johnsbury, Vermont, from the south St. Johnsbury Welcome Sign

- Logo
- Nickname: St. J
- Motto: Very Vermont
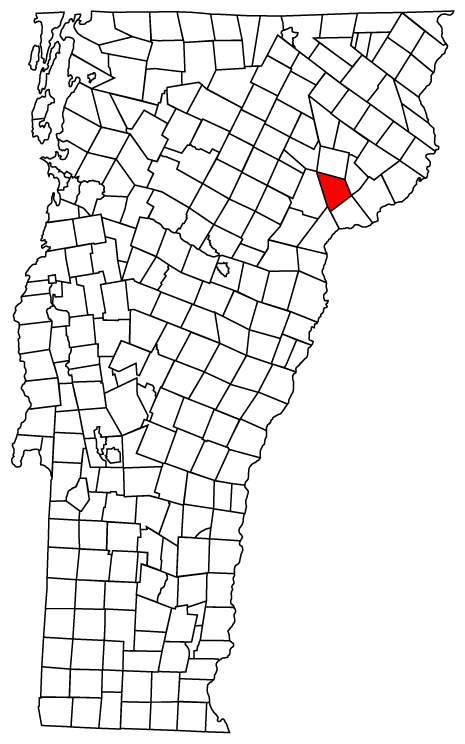
- St. Johnsbury, Vermont
- Coordinates: 44°29′12″N 72°00′40″W
- Country: United States
- State: Vermont
- County: Caledonia
- Chartered: 1786
- Settled: 1786
- Organized: 1790
- Communities: St. Johnsbury; St. Johnsbury Center; East St. Johnsbury

Area
  - Total: 36.8 sq mi (95.2 km^{2})
  - Land: 36.4 sq mi (94.3 km^{2})
  - Water: 0.35 sq mi (0.9 km^{2})
- Elevation: 614 ft (187 m)

Population (2020)
  - Total: 7,364
  - Density: 202/sq mi (78.1/km^{2})
- Time zone: UTC−5 (Eastern (EST))
  - Summer (DST): UTC−4 (EDT)
- ZIP Codes: 05819 (St. Johnsbury); 05838 (East St. Johnsbury); 05863 (St. Johnsbury Center); 05824 (Concord); 05851 (Lyndonville)
- Area code: 802
- FIPS code: 50-62200
- GNIS feature ID: 1462199
- Website: www.stjvt.com

St. Johnsbury or Saint Johnsbury (known locally as "St. J") is the shire town (county seat) of Caledonia County, Vermont, United States. As of the 2020 census, the population was 7,364. St. Johnsbury is situated on the Passumpsic River and is located approximately six miles northwest of the Connecticut River and 48 miles (77 km) south of the Canada–U.S. border.

St. Johnsbury is the largest town by population in the Northeast Kingdom of Vermont and has long served as a commercial center for the region. The more densely settled southern one-third of the town is defined by the U.S. Census Bureau as the St. Johnsbury census-designated place, where over 81% of the population resides.

== History ==
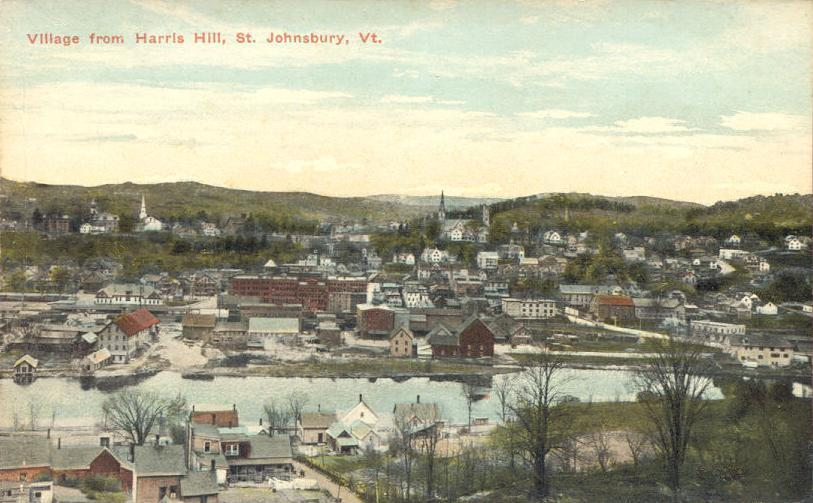
Bird's-eye view c. 1910

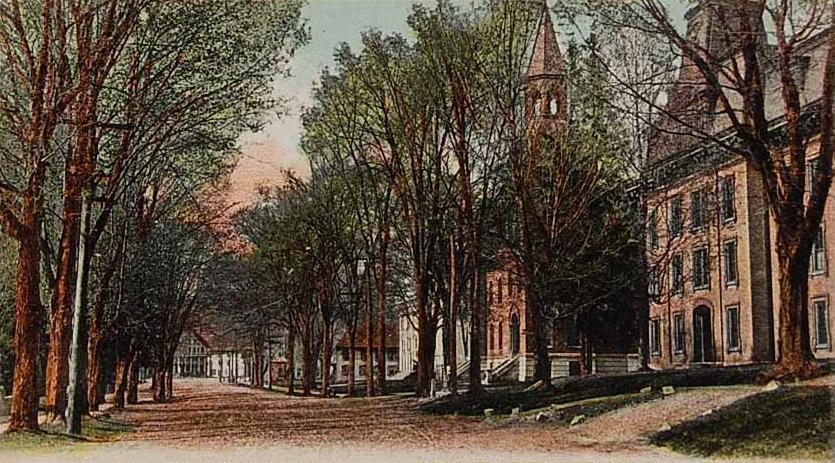
South Main Street c. 1905

The town was originally granted in 1760 as part of the New Hampshire Grants and named Bessborough. It was regranted by Vermont in 1786 as Dunmore, and settled the same year. An early settler was Jonathan Arnold, a member of the Continental Congress and author of Rhode Island's act of secession from the Kingdom of Great Britain in May 1776. Arnold left Rhode Island in 1787 and, with six other families, built homes at what is now the town center.

By 1790, the village had grown to 143 inhabitants, and the first town meeting took place in Arnold's home that year, where the name St. Johnsbury was adopted. According to local lore, Vermont founder Ethan Allen himself proposed naming the town St. John in honor of his friend Jean de Crèvecœur, a French-born author and agriculturist and a friend of Benjamin Franklin. (He was known in the United States as J. Hector St. John.) According to this account, de Crèvecœur suggested instead the unusual St. Johnsbury to differentiate it from Saint John, New Brunswick.

In the mid-19th century, St. Johnsbury became a minor manufacturing center, with the main products being scales—the platform scale was invented there by Thaddeus Fairbanks in 1830—and maple syrup and related products. With the arrival of the railroad line from Boston to Montreal in the 1850s, St. Johnsbury grew quickly and was named the shire town (county seat) in 1856, replacing Danville. The oldest occupied residence in St. Johnsbury was built in 1798 and located on the corner of Summer and Central streets, attached to the J. J. Palmer house.

The former St. Johnsbury Fairground was located where Interstates 91 and 93 converge, south of the town. The Third Vermont Regiment drilled there prior to joining the Union Army during the Civil War. The first air flight in Vermont occurred at the fair on April 19, 1910.

In the 1940s the town contained three major industrial companies, each then the largest of its type in the world. One was Fairbanks Scales, another was a maple sugar candy company, while a third made candlepins for bowling. The rest of the economy was mostly rural.

== Geography ==
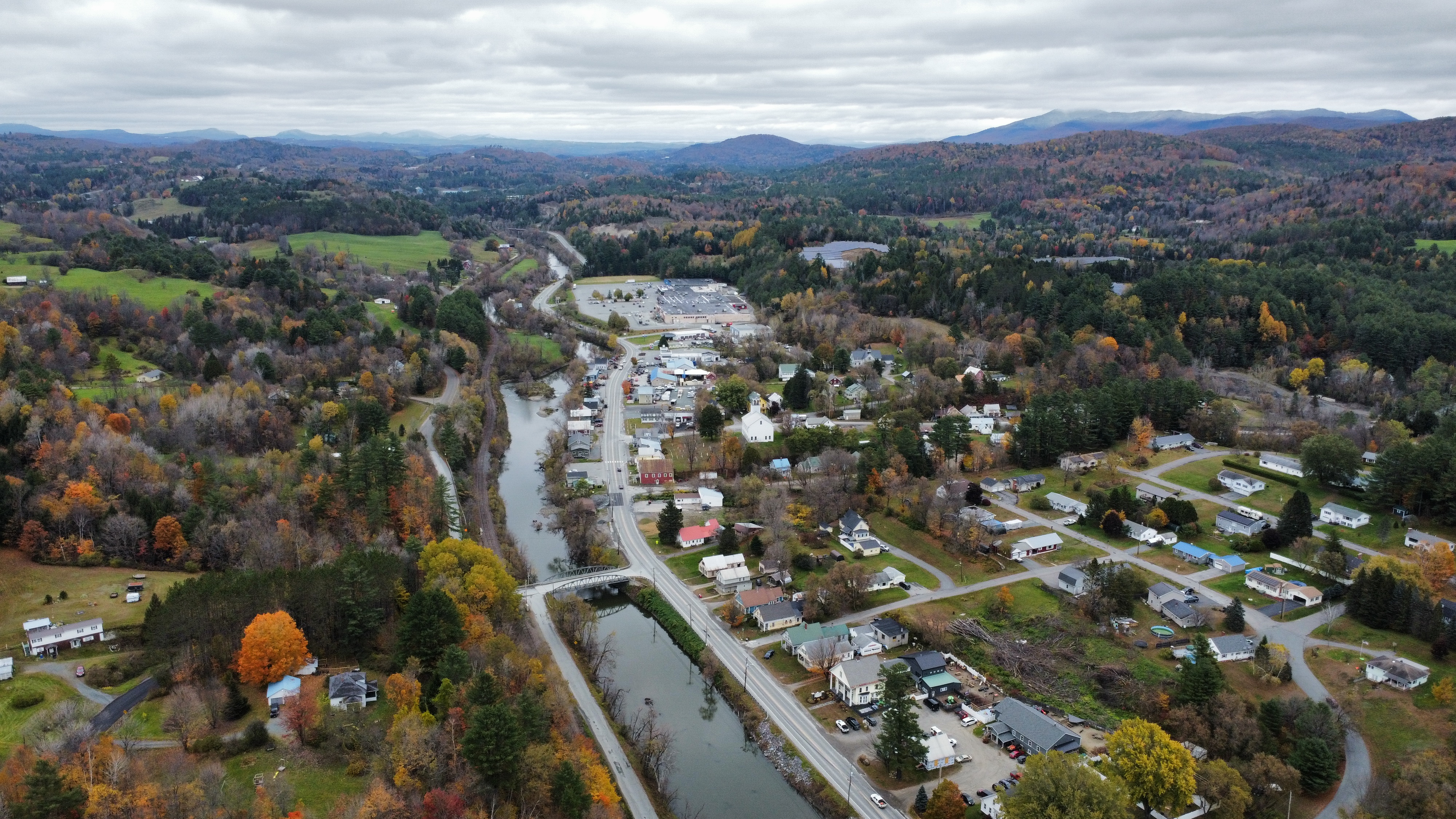
St. Johnsbury Center is a village located near the geographic center of the town, north of the more developed part of town

St. Johnsbury is located at 44°25′N 72°01′W, elevation 212.4 m (697 ft). According to the United States Census Bureau, the town has a total area of 36.8 square miles (95.2 km^{2}), of which 36.4 square miles (94.3 km^{2}) is land and 0.35 square miles (0.9 km^{2}), or 0.96%, is water. Situated at the confluence of the Passumpsic, Moose and Sleeper's rivers, the town lies at the heart of the Passumpsic River basin, one of the largest of the upper Connecticut River watershed. St. Johnsbury is on the site of the northernmost boundary of Lake Hitchcock, the post-glacial predecessor to the Connecticut River.

The town has multiple historic neighborhoods such as Arlington, Summerville, Four seasons (which contains the former Paddock Village), and Downtown.

The town includes the unincorporated villages of St. Johnsbury, East St. Johnsbury, Goss Hollow, Cole's corner, and St. Johnsbury Center. The town center, which is defined as a census-designated place (CDP), encompasses the villages of St. Johnsbury and St. Johnsbury Center and covers an area of 13.1 square miles (33.9 km^{2}), about 36% of the area of the town.

The highest point in St. Johnsbury is an unnamed hill in the northwestern part of town east of Libby Road. The twin summits of the hill each rise above 1,594 feet (486 m) above sea level.

=== Climate ===
Climate data for St. Johnsbury, Vermont (1971–2000)
Month	Jan	Feb	Mar	Apr	May	Jun	Jul	Aug	Sep	Oct	Nov	Dec	Year
Record high °F (°C)	63 (17)	62 (17)	84 (29)	92 (33)	94 (34)	98 (37)	99 (37)	98 (37)	95 (35)	89 (32)	77 (25)	67 (19)	99 (37)
Mean daily maximum °F (°C)	27.6 (−2.4)	32.0 (0.0)	42.4 (5.8)	55.9 (13.3)	69.9 (21.1)	77.1 (25.1)	80.8 (27.1)	78.2 (25.7)	69.3 (20.7)	57.6 (14.2)	43.4 (6.3)	31.5 (−0.3)	55.5 (13.1)
Mean daily minimum °F (°C)	6.4 (−14.2)	8.3 (−13.2)	19.6 (−6.9)	31.1 (−0.5)	42.7 (5.9)	52.1 (11.2)	56.8 (13.8)	55.4 (13.0)	47.4 (8.6)	36.4 (2.4)	27.6 (−2.4)	13.7 (−10.2)	33.1 (0.6)
Record low °F (°C)	−35 (−37)	−43 (−42)	−27 (−33)	−2 (−19)	20 (−7)	30 (−1)	36 (2)	33 (1)	22 (−6)	13 (−11)	−13 (−25)	−42 (−41)	−43 (−42)
Average precipitation inches (mm)	2.88 (73)	2.04 (52)	2.57 (65)	2.74 (70)	3.35 (85)	3.88 (99)	3.84 (98)	4.21 (107)	3.47 (88)	3.24 (82)	3.32 (84)	3.00 (76)	38.54 (979)
Average snowfall inches (cm)	22.7 (58)	16.8 (43)	15.1 (38)	5.3 (13)	0.2 (0.51)	0 (0)	0 (0)	0 (0)	0.1 (0.25)	0.6 (1.5)	6.6 (17)	20.8 (53)	88.2 (224.26)
Source: NOAA

== Demographics ==
Historical population
Census	Pop.	Note	%±
1790	143		—
1800	663		363.6%
1810	1,334		101.2%
1820	1,404		5.2%
1830	1,592		13.4%
1840	1,887		18.5%
1850	2,758		46.2%
1860	3,469		25.8%
1870	4,665		34.5%
1880	5,800		24.3%
1890	6,567		13.2%
1900	7,010		6.7%
1910	8,098		15.5%
1920	8,708		7.5%
1930	9,696		11.3%
1940	9,095		−6.2%
1950	9,292		2.2%
1960	8,869		−4.6%
1970	8,409		−5.2%
1980	7,938		−5.6%
1990	7,608		−4.2%
2000	7,571		−0.5%
2010	7,604		0.4%
2020	7,364		−3.2%
U.S. Decennial Census

As of the census of 2010, there were 7,604 people, 3,236 households, and 1,917 families residing in the town. The population density was 209 people per square mile (79.7/km^{2}). There were 3,482 housing units at an average density of 94.49/sq mi (36.5/km^{2}). The racial makeup of the town was 94.5% White, 0.8% African American, 0.7% Native American, 1.2% Asian, 0.03% Pacific Islander, 0.2% from other races, and 1.4% from two or more races. 1.5% of the population were Hispanic or Latino of any race.

There were 3,197 households, out of which 28.8% had children under the age of 18 living with them, 44.5% were married couples living together, 11.8% had a female householder with no husband present, and 40.0% were non-families. 32.9% of all households were made up of individuals, and 15.2% had someone living alone who was 65 years of age or older. The average household size was 2.25 and the average family size was 2.85.

In the town, the population was spread out, with 12.8% under the age of 18, 19.1% from 18 to 24, 26.0% from 25 to 44, 23.6% from 45 to 64, and 18.5% who were 65 years of age or older. The median age was 39.5 years. For every 100 females, there were 93.7 males. For every 100 females age 18 and over, there were 90.5 males.

The median income for a household in the town was $20,269, and the median income for a family was $41,961. Males had a median income of $30,846 versus $22,131 for females. The per capita income for the town was $16,807. 14.7% of the population and 12.0% of families were below the poverty line. Out of the total people living in poverty, 37.8% are under the age of 18 and 11.1% are 65 or older.

=== Town center ===
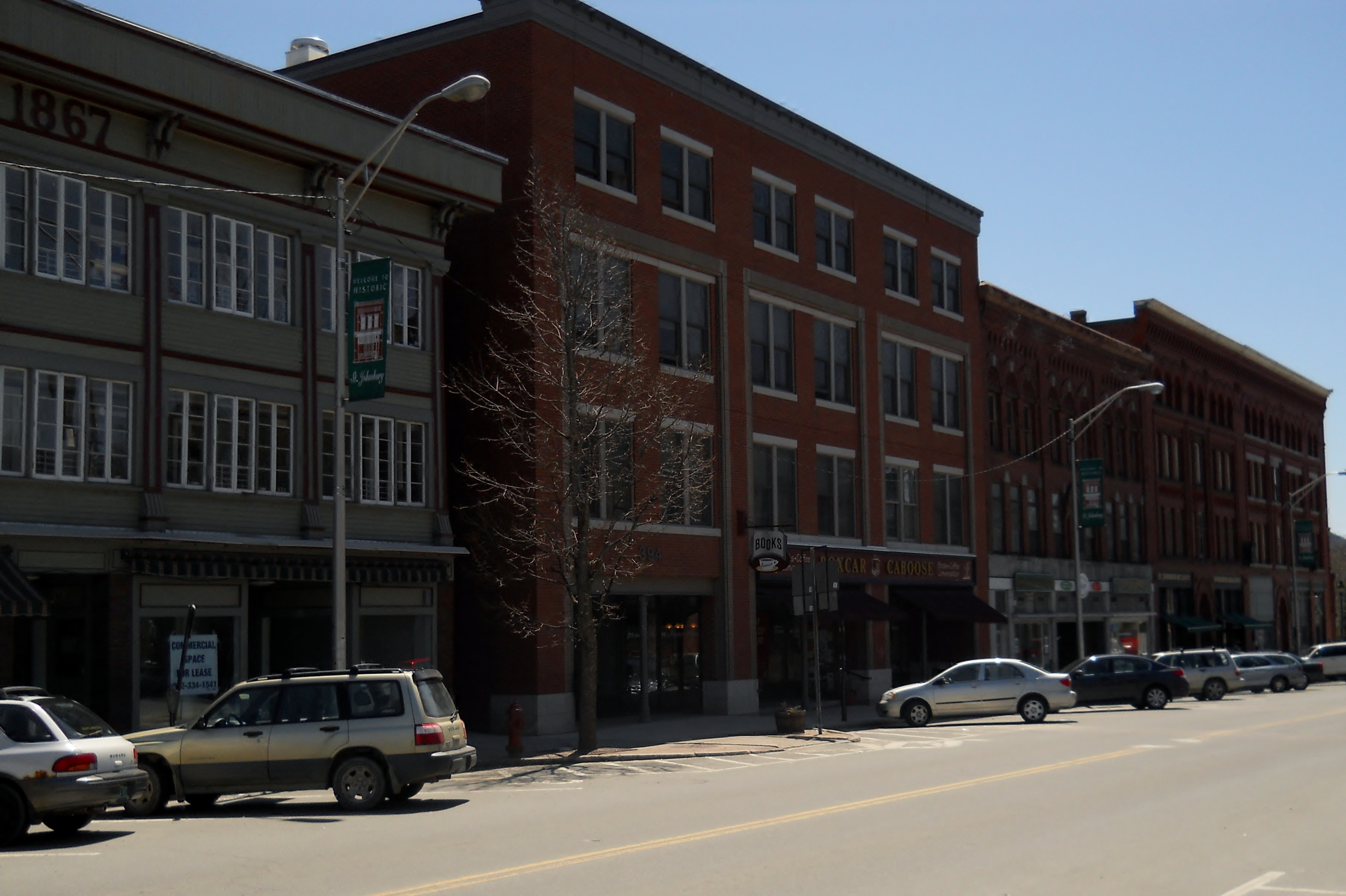
Railroad Street in downtown St. Johnsbury

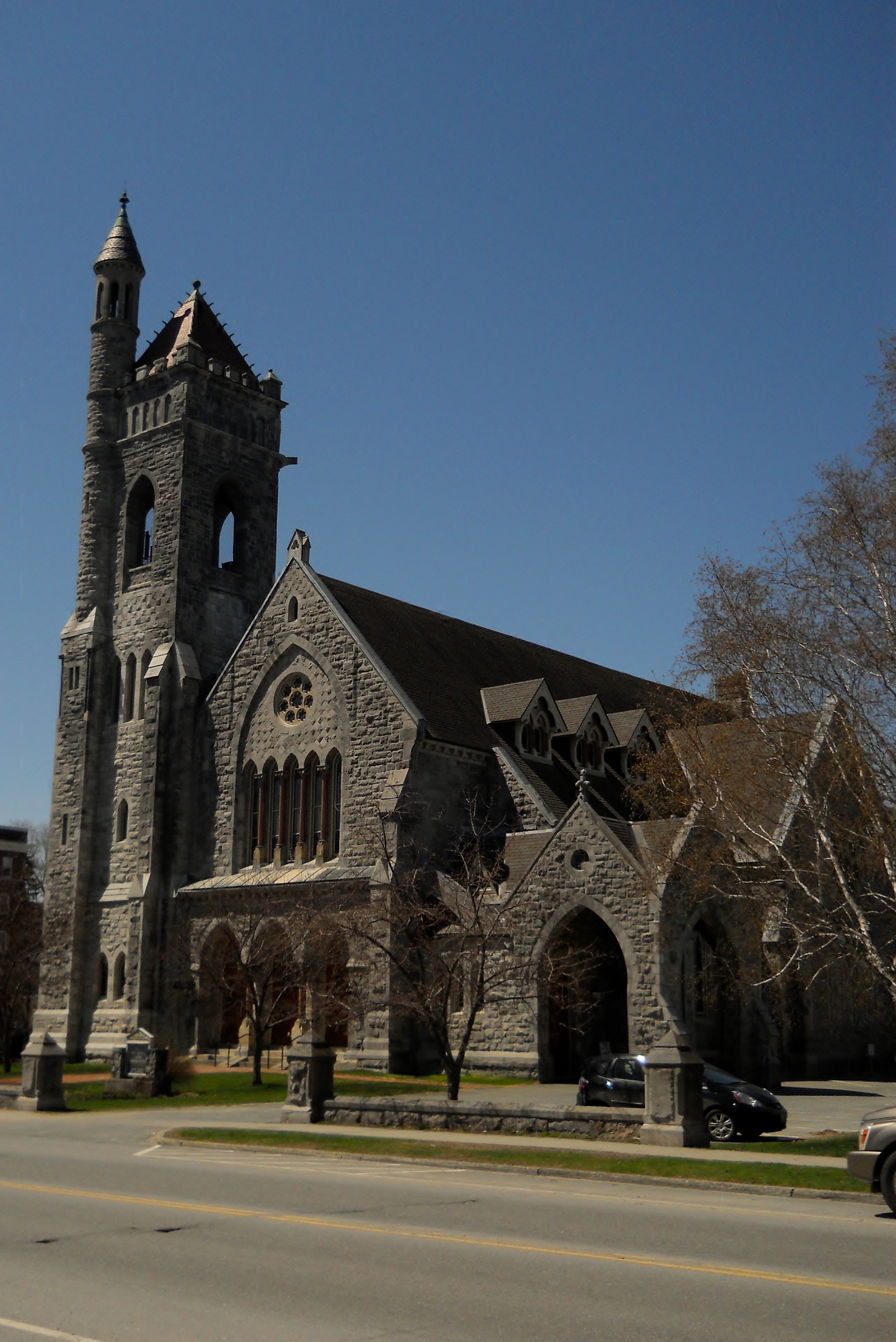
North Congregational Church on Main Street

The U.S. Census Bureau refers to the most developed portion of the town as a census-designated place (CDP).

As of the census of 2000, there were 6,319 people, 2,726 households, and 1,561 families residing in the CDP. The population density was 486.8 people per square mile (188.0/km^{2}). There were 2,985 housing units at an average density of 230.0 per square mile (88.8/km^{2}). The racial makeup of the CDP was 96.23% White, 0.47% Black or African American, 0.74% Native American, 0.65% Asian, 0.03% Pacific Islander, 0.27% from other races, and 1.60% from two or more races. Hispanic or Latino of any race were 1.35% of the population.

There were 2,726 households, out of which 27.6% had children under the age of 18 living with them, 41.6% were married couples living together, 12.3% had a female householder with no husband present, and 42.7% were non-families. 35.6% of all households were made up of individuals, and 16.6% had someone living alone who was 65 years of age or older. The average household size was 2.18 and the average family size was 2.83.

In the CDP, the population was spread out, with 22.3% under the age of 18, 9.0% from 18 to 24, 25.6% from 25 to 44, 23.2% from 45 to 64, and 19.9% who were 65 years of age or older. The median age was 40 years. For every 100 females, there were 93.0 males. For every 100 females age 18 and over, there were 89.4 males.

The median income for a household in the CDP was $26,702, and the median income for a family was $39,890. Males had a median income of $31,454 versus $21,283 for females. The per capita income for the CDP was $16,561. About 12.8% of families and 15.8% of the population were below the poverty line, including 24.3% of those under age 18 and 9.1% of those age 65 or over.

== Education ==
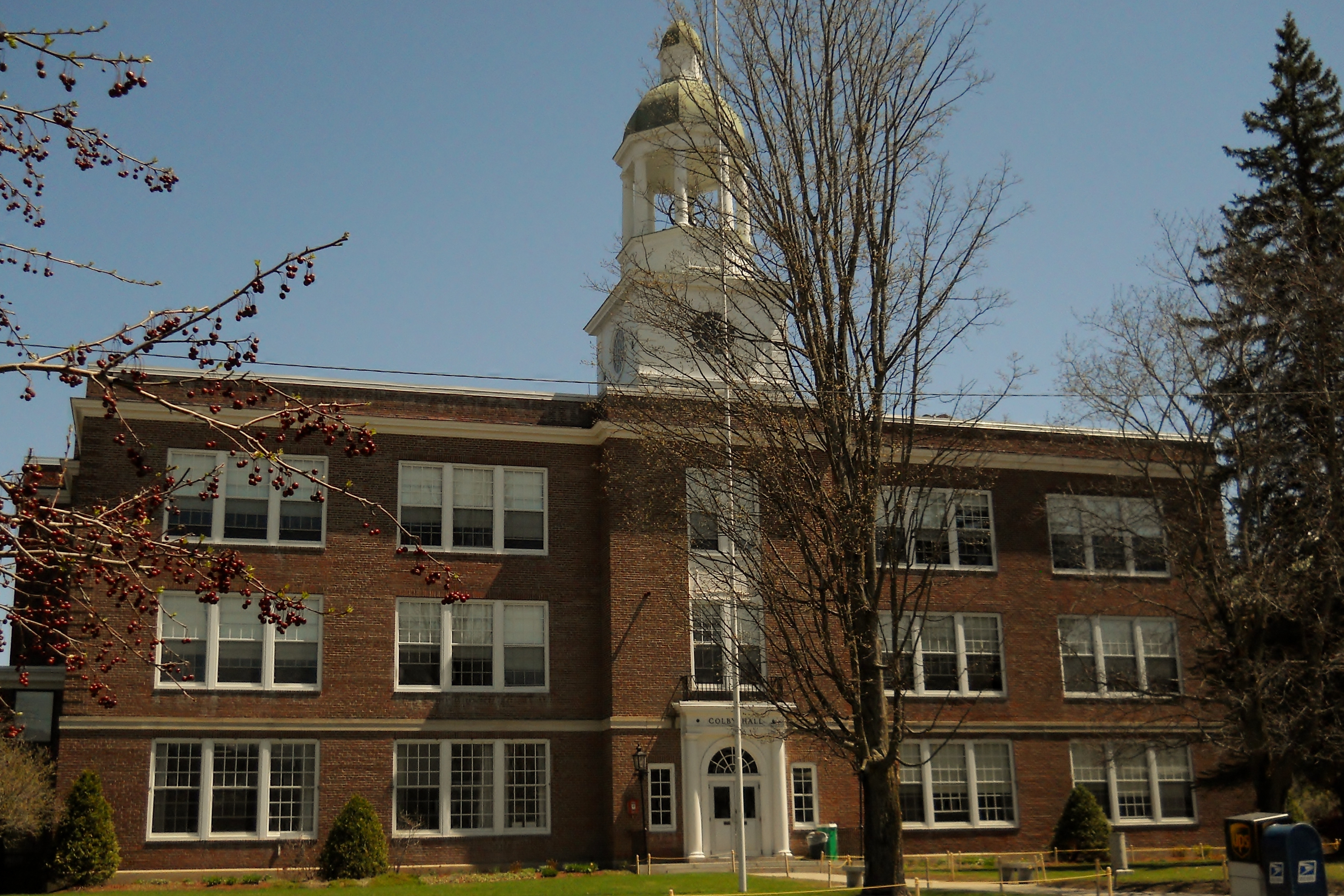
St. Johnsbury Academy – Colby Hall

- St. Johnsbury Academy is a private high school founded by the Fairbanks family, including Erastus Fairbanks, in 1842. The town of St. Johnsbury does not operate a public school for grades 9–12, but Vermont law requires towns not operating schools to pay tuition to other approved schools for students in the grades not provided, an amount up to the Average Announced Tuition for union schools. A majority of St. Johnsbury secondary school students choose to be educated at St. Johnsbury Academy at the town's expense.
- St. Johnsbury Trade School opened in September 1918, offering the only four year vocational education in the area. The school's founders, Fairbanks, Morse and Company, wanted to provide young people with the opportunity to learn a trade while providing them a base for earning more money and high school courses. After serving the community for over 50 years, the Trade School was closed, and the building then became the junior high. In 1981, it became the St. Johnsbury Middle School. After consolidating the local school system, the old trade school became the site of the St. Johnsbury School serving students from K–8th grade.
- St. Johnsbury School now serves pre-kindergarten through 8th grade.
- Good Shepherd School is operated by St. John the Evangelist Roman Catholic Church and serves pre-school through 8th grade.
- Arlington School, formerly Caledonia School, and Cornerstone, formerly Portland Street School, are behavioral and special needs schools located on School st. and Portland st. respectively
- Christian Caledonia School is a Seventh-Day Adventist School located on 54 Southard St, Arlington Saint Johnsbury
- Pleasant Street Baptist Church Offers sunday school services
- The Community College of Vermont (CCV) has a campus located at the Fairbanks Museum, and the Fairbanks Museum also offers classes to the public.

== Government ==
=== Selectboard ===
Saint Johnsbury uses a selectboard model where legislative and executive functions are rooted in elected board of officials who hire an administration, including a town manager. This board is composed of three three-year seats and two one-year seats. Each three-year seat alternates so that only one is up for re-election each year, whereas one-year seats are on a two seat, one-election ballot where all candidates compete and the candidates with the highest two vote totals are elected. Chair and Vice Chair positions are apportioned through an internal vote, usually the next meeting after Town Meeting Day.

2026 Saint Johnsbury Selectboard members
Three-Year Selectman		Chair	Vice Chair	One-Year Selectman(s)	
Steve Isham		Frank Empsall	Ellen Burt	Dennis Smith	Brendan Hughes
2026 Vote Totals	(2025) 942/1156	(2024) 1020/1287	524/1257	572/2514	517/2514
Chair Votes		3/5 Yes, 1 Abstain, 1 no vote	4/5 yes, 1 Abstain		

March 2nd 2027 is the next Selectboard elections

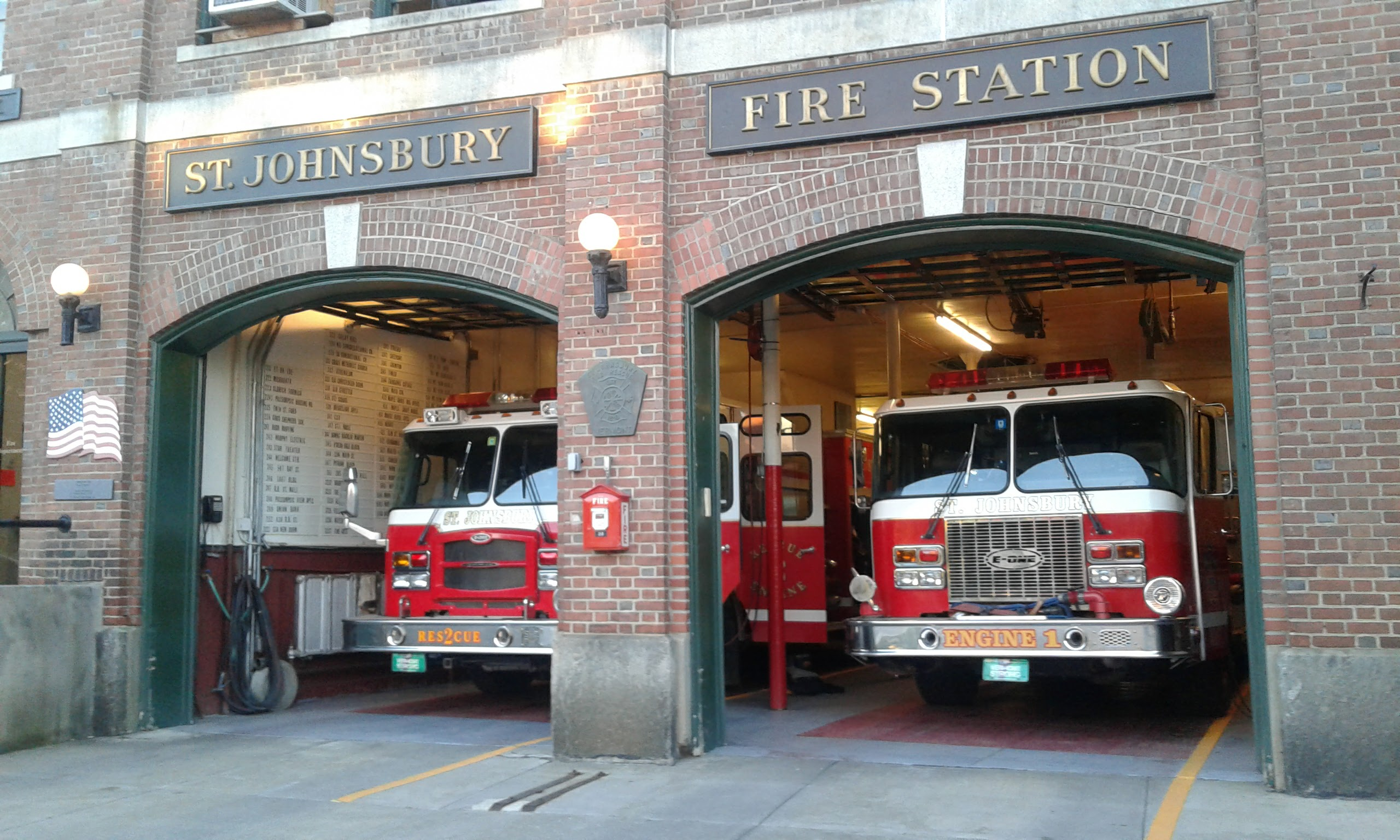
St. Johnsbury Fire Station with two fire engines

=== Fire department ===
In 2010, the town employed ten firefighters. The department had an annual budget of $945,920. It has had a professional department since circa 1910.

=== Social services ===
Social services are provided in part by Northeast Kingdom Community Action located here and in other Northeast Kingdom sites.

== Economy ==
=== Industry ===
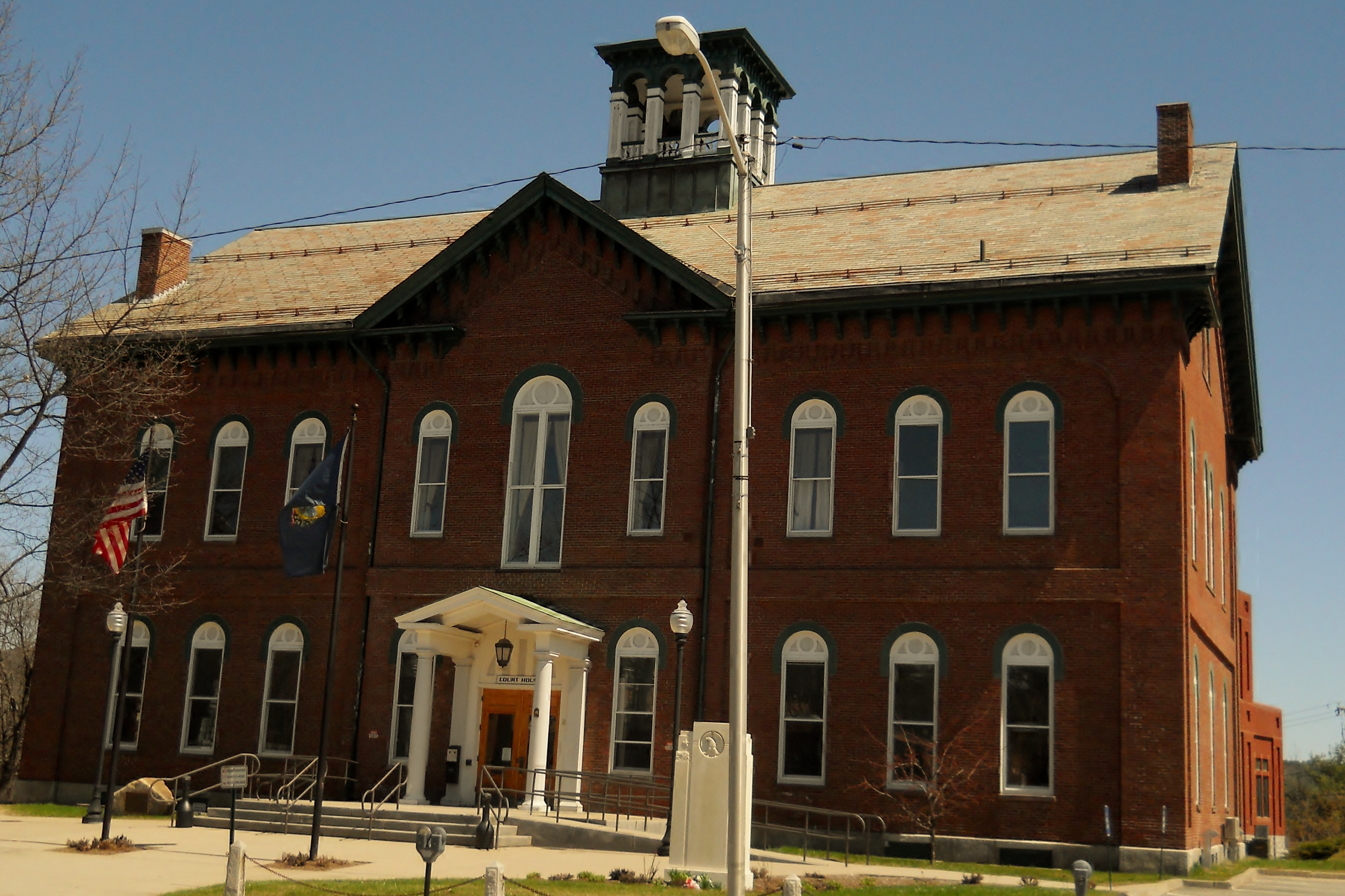
- Caledonia Superior Court on Main Street
  E.T. & H.K. Ide Company, a grain wholesaler founded in 1813, was the oldest continuously operating business in town when the family stopped operations in 2003. It is no longer operational.
- Fairbanks Scales, precision machinery and manufacturing company still in business after more than 190 years, employs 160 workers.
- Maple Grove Farms of Vermont was founded by Katharine Ide Gray in 1915. It is the largest packer of pure maple syrup in the United States. In 2006, they employed 100 and had sales of $75 million. They are a subsidiary of B&G Foods.

=== Retail ===
Green Mountain Mall is a shopping mall north of downtown St. Johnsbury on U.S. Route 5. The anchor store was JCPenney. On December 16, 2020, it was announced that JCPenney would be closing as part of a plan to close 15 stores nationwide. The store closed in May 2021.

=== Medical ===
The Northeast Kingdom Human Services aids mental health needs. The Northeastern Vermont Regional Hospital is located in the town.

== Culture ==
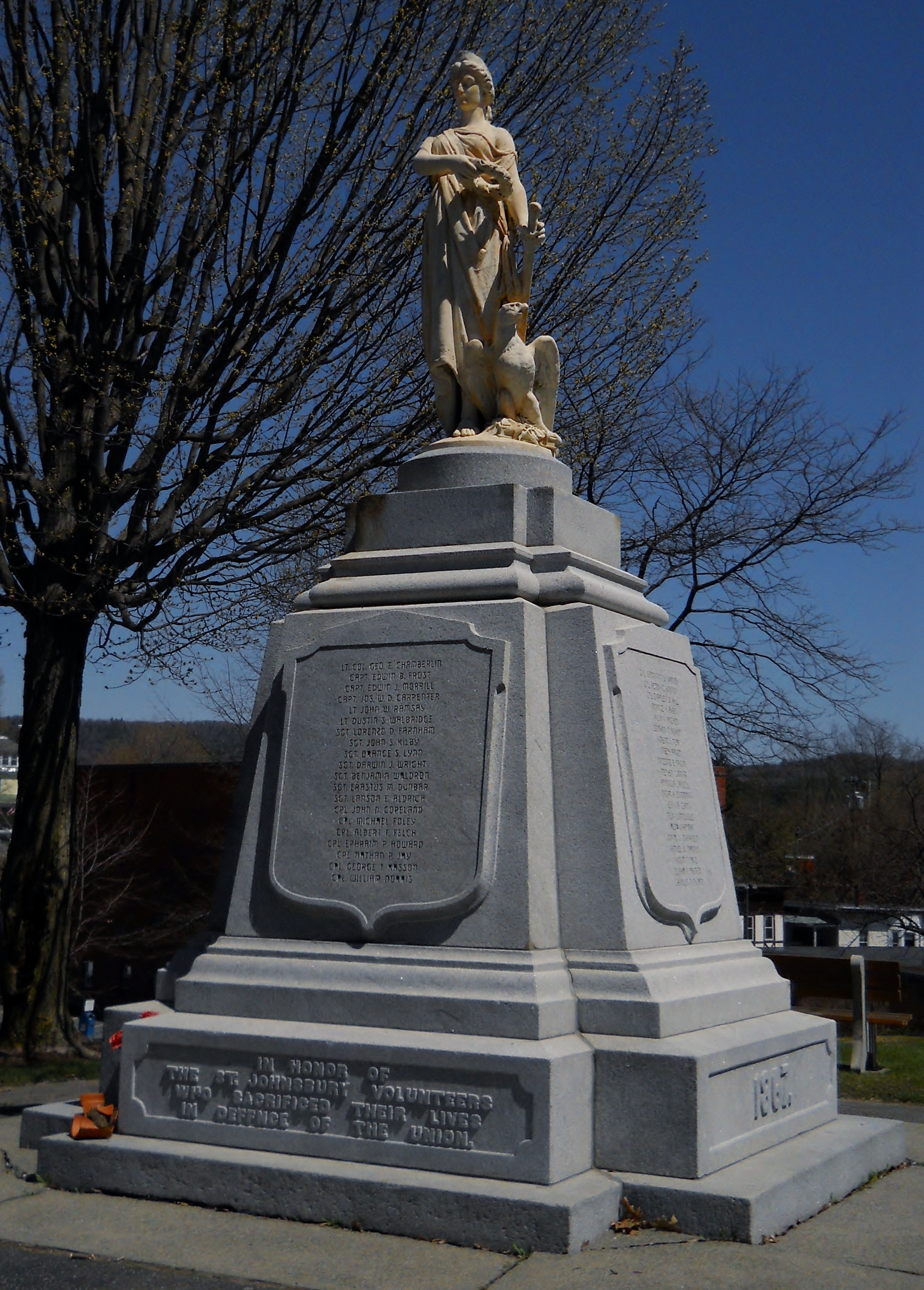
This monument, located in Courthouse Park, honors those volunteers who died in the Civil War.

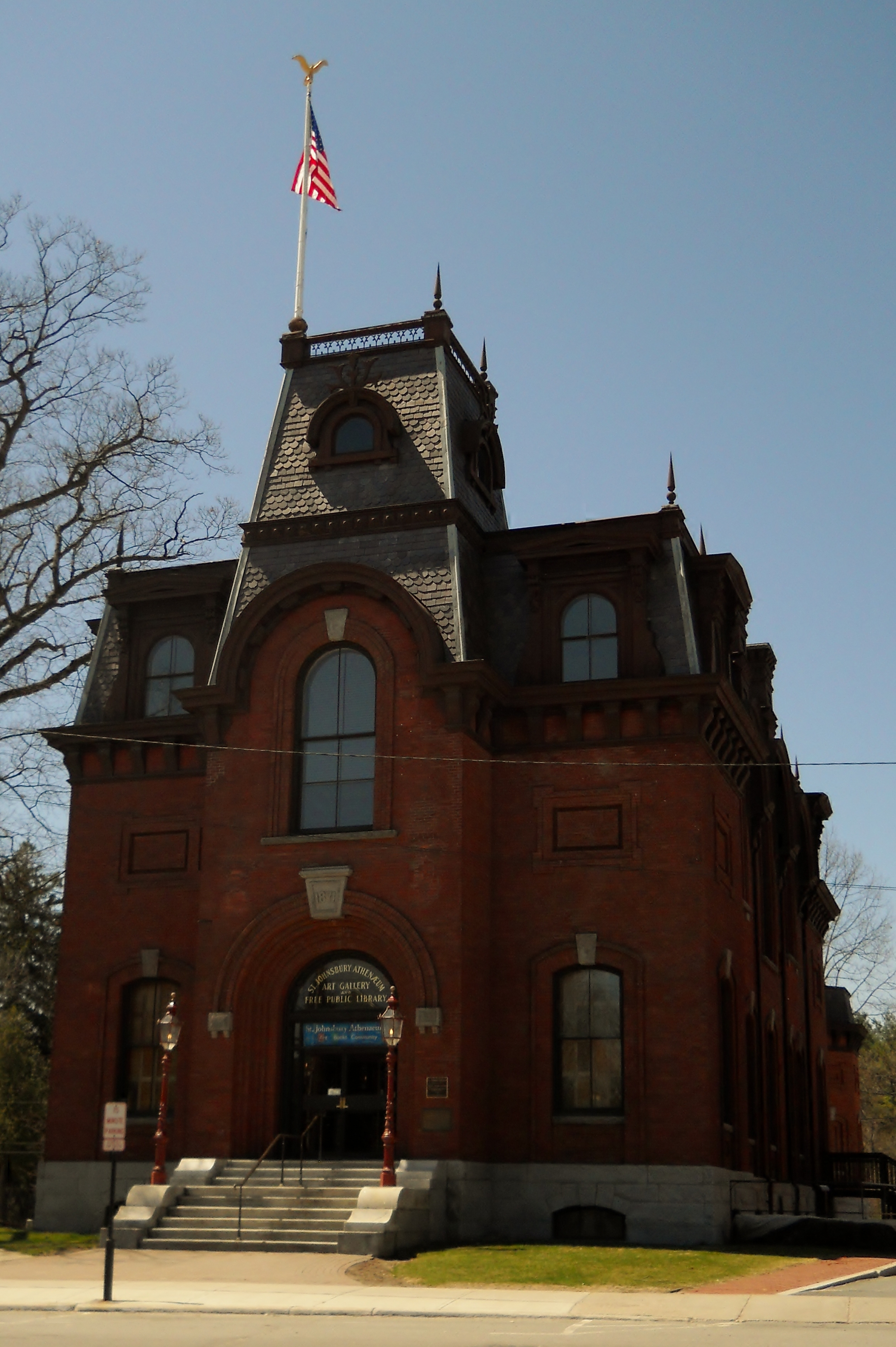
The St. Johnsbury Athenaeum is the only National Historic Landmark in the Northeast Kingdom.

St. Johnsbury is the home of the Fairbanks Museum & Planetarium which opened in 1891 as a gift of Franklin Fairbanks, a businessman, naturalist and philanthropist, to the community. His donated collections remain northern New England’s most extensive natural history display, and the National Register-listed building is a splendid example of the Richardsonian Romanesque style. The Fairbanks Museum is well known in Vermont for producing the "Eye on the Sky" weather forecast which is broadcast on Vermont Public Radio and Magic 97.7 FM.

There has been an annual First Night community celebration of the arts on New Year's Eve since 1993.

The town contains the only National Historic Landmark in the county, as well as the only one in the Northeast Kingdom - the St. Johnsbury Athenaeum. The town also contains 13 other places on the list of National Register of Historic Places, the most in Caledonia County or the Northeast Kingdom:

1. Benoit Apartment House-74 Pearl Street (added June 6, 1994)
2. Benoit Apartment House-76 Pearl Street (added June 6, 1994)
3. Caleb H. Marshall House — 53 Summer St. (added September 16, 1994)
4. Cote Apartment House — 16 Elm St. (added June 6, 1994)
5. Franklin Fairbanks House — 30 Western Ave. (added October 27, 1980)
6. Fairbanks Museum & Planetarium – 1302 Main St. (added December 31, 2007)
7. Maple Street-Clarks Avenue Historic District — 17-49 Maple St., 4-34 Clarks Ave., 95 1/2-101 Main St., 4 and 6 Frost Ave. and 3 and 5 Idlewood Terr. (added June 5, 1994)
8. Morency Paint Shop and Apartment Building — 73-77 Portland St. (added June 5, 1994)
9. Railroad Street Historic District — roughly bounded north and south by Railroad St. and Canadian Pacific RR tracks (added July 25, 1974)
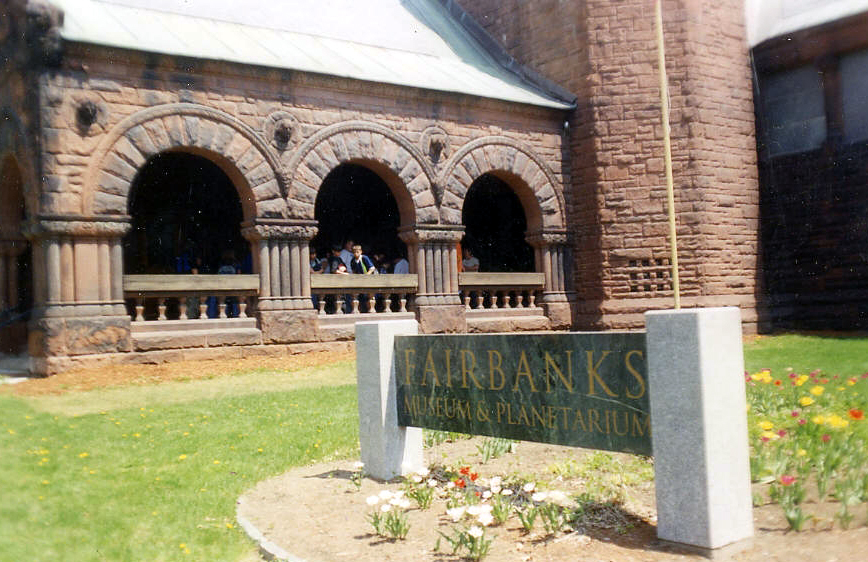
  Fairbanks Museum
10. Shearer and Corser Double House — 81-83 Summer St. (added September 16, 1994)
11. St. Johnsbury Federal Fish Culture Station — 374 Emerson Falls Rd. (added April 18, 2005)
12. St. Johnsbury Historic District — U.S. 5 and U.S. 2 (added May 17, 1980)
13. St. Johnsbury Main Street Historic District — area along Main St. including intersecting streets (added June 28, 1975)

The town is mentioned in Hayden Carruth's classic poem "Regarding Chainsaws." Carruth lived and farmed in that area of Vermont for many years.

== Media ==
The Caledonian-Record, a daily newspaper, has been published since 1837. Farming, the Journal of Northeast Agriculture is published locally.

== Infrastructure ==
=== Highways ===
The town is a major intersection point of multiple highways. Interstate 91 and Interstate 93 intersect at the town's southern border, which is also where the latter highway terminates. I-91 has three exits for St. Johnsbury, and I-93 has one serving the eastern portion of town as well as neighboring Waterford. In addition to the interstate highways, U.S. Route 2 runs west to the state capital of Montpelier and east to Lancaster, New Hampshire, while U.S. Route 5 runs north-south, following I-91. Vermont Route 2B also begins from the town.

=== Railways ===
In addition to the highways, St. Johnsbury was also once a major railroad junction as well. The Boston and Maine operated a major north-south line which facilitated service from White River Junction and Massachusetts in the south to Quebec via Newport in the north. This is the town's only railway line still in present-day operation, it is now directly owned by the Vermont Agency of Transportation and operated by Vermont Railway. The town also once had a branch line of the Maine Central Railroad providing service east towards the junction at Whitefield. This branch line has been out of service since 1983. The final railway to serve the town was the St. Johnsbury and Lamoille County Railroad, providing service westwards towards Swanton and Lake Champlain. The entire length of this railway has since been converted into the Lamoille Valley Rail Trail, a multi-use trail running for 95 miles across northern Vermont.

=== Public Transportation ===
St. Johnsbury has commuter bus and dial-a-ride services provided by Rural Community Transportation, including an hourly loop bus service to and from Lyndonville to the north, and twice-daily bus services to the state capital Montpelier where one can connect with other local and long-distance bus services.

=== Trails ===
The town is the starting point for the 95-mile multi-use Lamoille Valley Rail Trail across northern Vermont. Additionally, the town forest provides a modest network of hiking and mountain bike trails.

== See also ==
- Fairbanks Museum and Planetarium
- St. Johnsbury Athenaeum
