= Lamoille Valley Rail Trail =

Multi-use trail in Vermont, USA

Lamoille Valley Rail Trail (LVRT)
- Section of the LVRT in Wolcott, Vermont
- Length: 95 mi (153 km)
- Location: Vermont, United States
- Established: 2023
- Use: walking, cycling, nordic skiing, snowmobiling
- Highest point: Walden Heights, 1,698 ft (518 m)
- Lowest point: Swanton, 154 ft (47 m)
- Grade: 1-3
- Difficulty: Easy
- Season: All
- Surface: Crushed Gravel
- Right of way: St. Johnsbury and Lamoille County Railroad
- Maintainer: Vermont Association of Snow Travelers (VAST) and Vermont Agency of Transportation (VTrans)
- Website: https://railtrails.vermont.gov/trails/lamoille-valley-rail-trail/

The Lamoille Valley Rail Trail (LVRT) is a multi-use rail trail in Vermont. The official length of the trail is 95 miles (153 km) making it the longest rail trail in New England as of 2026. The trail runs northwest from St. Johnsbury to Swanton through the northern Green Mountain range. Despite the mountainous terrain the trail passes through, as a former railway alignment, the maximum grade is 3%. The trail is open year-round, and access is restricted to pedestrians, horse-riding, and non-motorized vehicles. Snowmobile access is also allowed, though only in the winter months. The trail is maintained by the Vermont Association of Snow Travelers (VAST) in partnership with the Vermont Agency of Transportation (VTrans).

== History ==
The trail is built along the right-of-way of the former St. Johnsbury and Lamoille County Railroad. Construction of the railway line between St. Johnsbury and Swanton was completed in 1877. The railway changed ownership multiple times throughout the 20th century, and eventually ceased all operations in 1994. In 1997, VAST began building a proposal for the line's conversion to a rail trail, with the project receiving approval from the state legislature in 2002. In 2005, U.S. Representative for Vermont Bernie Sanders secured $5.2 million in federal funding for the project.

While short segments of the trail were already in use as various local paths, construction of the trail officially began in 2013, with the first section opening in 2015 between St. Johnsbury and Danville. By 2018, VAST had completed 33 miles of trail on a budget of $6.5 million. VTrans was then given responsibility for developing the remaining 49 miles. The final trail segment, Hardwick to Wolcott Village, was completed in March of 2023. The full trail became open to the public on May 26th, 2023, though the official grand opening ceremony was postponed due to damage caused by major flooding across the state in July of that year. The total cost of construction at the time was over $31 million, which had been paid for using funding from several different public and private sources.

== Route ==
Mile markers along the route run east to west, with Mile 0 posted at the eastern trailhead in St. Johnsbury and Mile 94 posted in Swanton. The trail runs through mountainous terrain throughout most of its route. The highest elevation reached is 1698 feet (518 meters), in Walden near the 18 mile point. From Greensboro Bend to Cambridge Junction, the trail follows the Lamoille River. At Cambridge Junction, the trail diverts north towards East Fairfield, and from there on the trail runs through the flat farmland of the Champlain Valley. The trail intersects with the Missisquoi Valley Rail Trail at Sheldon Junction near the 84 mile point.

Map of LVRT route with official parking areas marked

The trail runs through the following towns:

| Town | Mile Section |
|---|---|
| St. Johnsbury | 0-4 |
| Danville | 4-16 |
| Cabot | 16-18 |
| Walden | 18-24 |
| Greensboro | 27-28 |
| Hardwick | 24-27 and 28-38 |
| Wolcott | 38-45 |
| Morristown | 45-51 |
| Hyde Park | 51-53 |
| Johnson | 53-60 |
| Cambridge | 60-68 |
| Fletcher | 68-70 |
| Bakersfield | 70-73 |
| Fairfield | 73-82 |
| Sheldon | 82-86 |
| Highgate | 86-93 |
| Swanton | 93-95 |
