= Montgomery Covered Bridge =

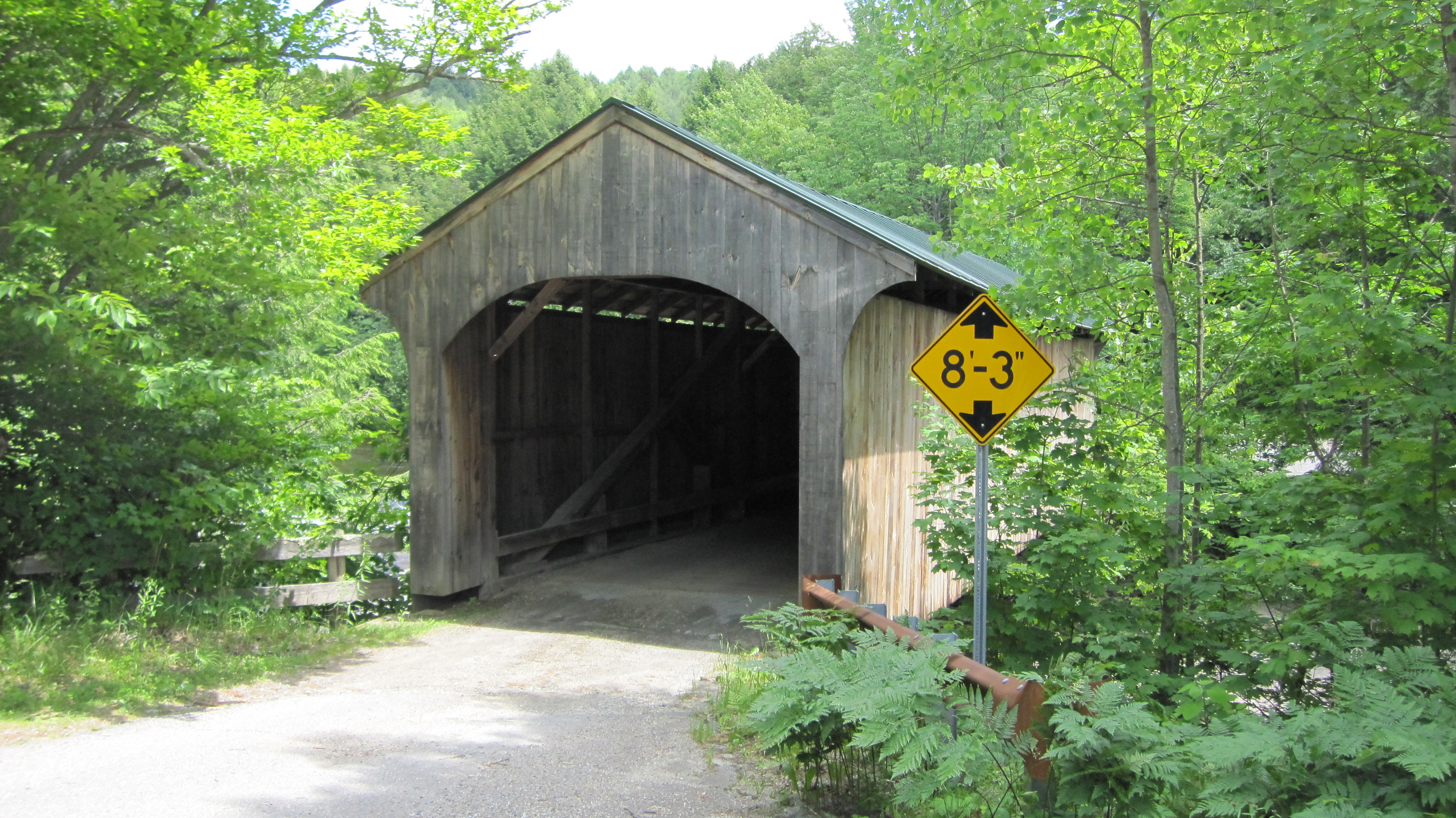
- Coordinates: 44°41′42″N 72°45′58″W
- Carries: Automobile
- Crosses: North Branch of Lamoille River
- Locale: Waterville, Vermont
- Maintained by: Town of Waterville
- ID number: VT-08-14

Characteristics
- Design: Covered, Town lattice
- Material: Wood
- Total length: 70 ft 3.75 in (21.43 m)
- Width: 12 ft 5.25 in (3.79 m)
- No. of spans: 1
- Clearance above: 8 ft 3 in (2.51 m)

History
- Construction end: 1887
- Montgomery Covered Bridge
- U.S. National Register of Historic Places
- Location within Vermont Location within the United States
- Coordinates: 44°41′42″N 72°45′56″W
- Area: 1 acre (0.40 ha)
- NRHP reference No.: 74000228
- Added to NRHP: October 18, 1974

The Montgomery Covered Bridge, also known as the Lower Covered Bridge is a wooden covered bridge that carries Montgomery Road across the North Branch of the Lamoille River in Waterville, Vermont. Built in 1887, it is one of three covered bridges in the town, and one of five on the river in a five-mile span. It was listed on the National Register of Historic Places in 1974.

== Naming ==
Despite the Geographical Names Information System (GNIS) database listing Lower as one of the names of this bridge, this may be an error as it is commonly known as the Middle Covered Bridge since it is between the Jaynes Covered Bridge (also known as the Upper bridge) and the Village Covered Bridge (also known as the Lower bridge). All cross the same waterway.

== Description ==
The Montgomery Covered Bridge is located in a rural area north of the town center of Waterville, a short way east of Vermont Route 109 on Montgomery Road, a dead-end road providing access to a single farm property. It is a single-span Queen post truss, 70.5 feet (21.5 m) long and 15 feet (4.6 m) wide, with a roadway width of 12 feet (3.7 m) (one lane). The trusses include iron roads between the peaks of the diagonal bracing and the bottom chords. The bridge is covered by a metal roof, and its exterior is finished in vertical board siding, which extends around to the insides of the portals. The bridge deck consists of wood planking resting on steel I-beams; the trusses no longer carry the bridge's active load.

== History ==
The bridge was built sometime in the late 1870s or early 1880s; its builder is unknown. It is one of five covered bridges over the North Branch Lamoille between Waterville and Belvidere, a notable concentration of such bridges in the state.

In 1969 a large snowstorm deposited 5 feet (2 m) of snow, concentrated more on one side of the roof than the other, which induced a lean. Dallas Montgomery, a farmer for whom the bridge is now named, got up on the roof to remove some of the snow. Local resident Wilmer Locke used a winch to right the lean and added bracing. In 1971 an asphalt truck fell through the deck into the river below (luckily with only minor injuries to the driver). The bridge was subsequently reinforced with steel beams. Major repairs were supposedly made in 1997.

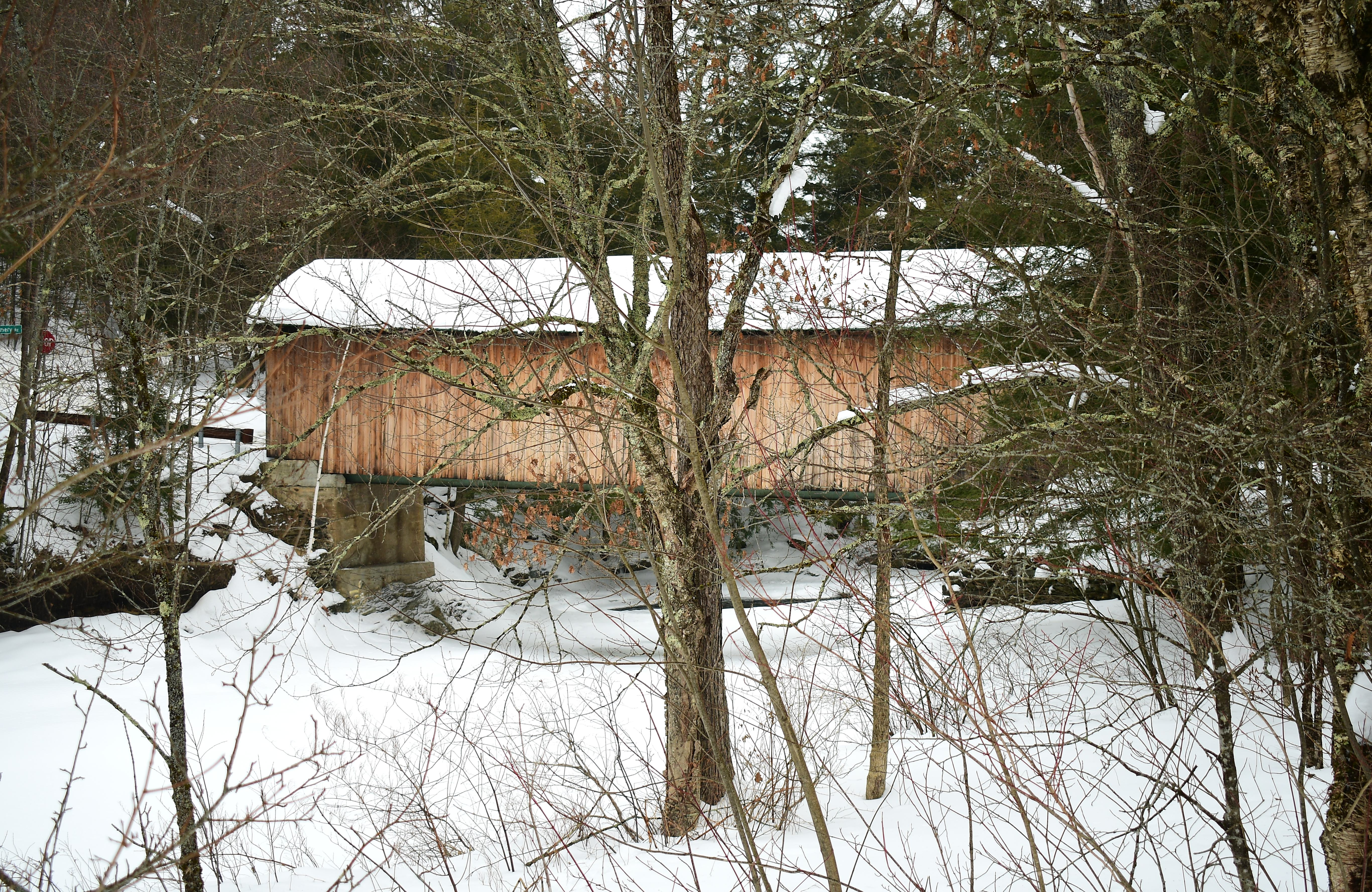

== See also ==
- National Register of Historic Places listings in Lamoille County, Vermont
- List of Vermont covered bridges
- List of bridges on the National Register of Historic Places in Vermont
