= Waterville Village Historic District =

Historic district in Vermont, United States

- U.S. National Register of Historic Places
- U.S. Historic district
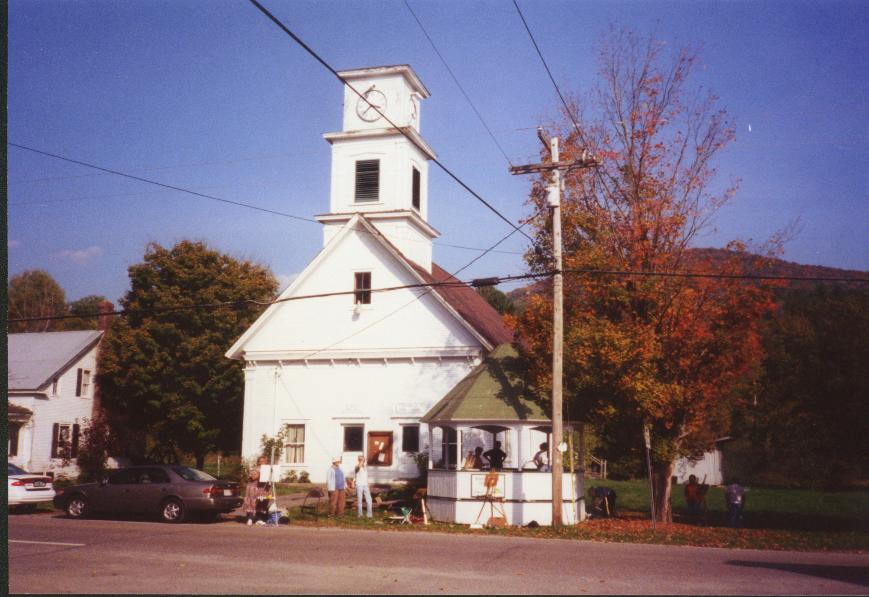

- Location within Vermont Location within the United States
- Location: VT 109, Oakes Rd., Church St., Griffin Rd., Fox Hill Rd., Beals Hill Rd., Lapland Rd., Waterville, Vermont
- Coordinates: 44°41′25″N 72°46′10″W
- Area: 47 acres (19 ha)
- Built: 1835
- Architectural style: Greek Revival, Colonial Revival
- NRHP reference No.: 07001026
- Added to NRHP: September 28, 2007

The Waterville Village Historic District encompasses most of the history 19th and early 20th-century village center of Waterville, Vermont. The village grew from beginnings late in the 18th century to serve as a modest civic, commercial, and residential hub for the rural community. It was added to the National Register of Historic Places in 2007.

== Description and history ==
The town of Waterville in northern Vermont was settled in the late 18th century and incorporated in 1824. The town center, located in its far south, grew as a linear mill village on the banks of the North Branch Lamoille River. Its first mills were sawmills and gristmills built early in the 19th century, and it was by mid-century a center for the processing of hemp. A textile mill was founded in 1846, which manufactured flannel cloth, but the success of that and other endeavours was cut off by fire. The village's industry declined later in the 19th century because it was bypassed by local railroads, and eventually all of the industrial buildings were lost to demolition or fire. The principal industry in the area is now dairy production.

The historic district is centered on the junction of Main Street (Vermont Route 109) and Church Street, also known historically as Bridge Street, because it leads to the covered bridge across the river. It extends west along Bridge Street just across the river to its junction with Griffin Road, and runs north on Main Street to its crossing of the river on a 20th-century steel girder bridge. It extends south as far as Oakes Road. The principal commercial building in the district is at the main junction, where three adjoining buildings now house a single general store. On the east side of the junction is the town hall, a former Universalist church building built in the mid-19th century in the Greek Revival style. There are two other church buildings in the village, including one built in 1911 for a new Nazarene congregation. Most of the residential housing in the district is vernacular and modest in scale, typically 1 1/2 stories in height, and of wood-frame construction.

== See also ==
- National Register of Historic Places listings in Lamoille County, Vermont
