= Jeffersonville Bridge =

- U.S. National Register of Historic Places
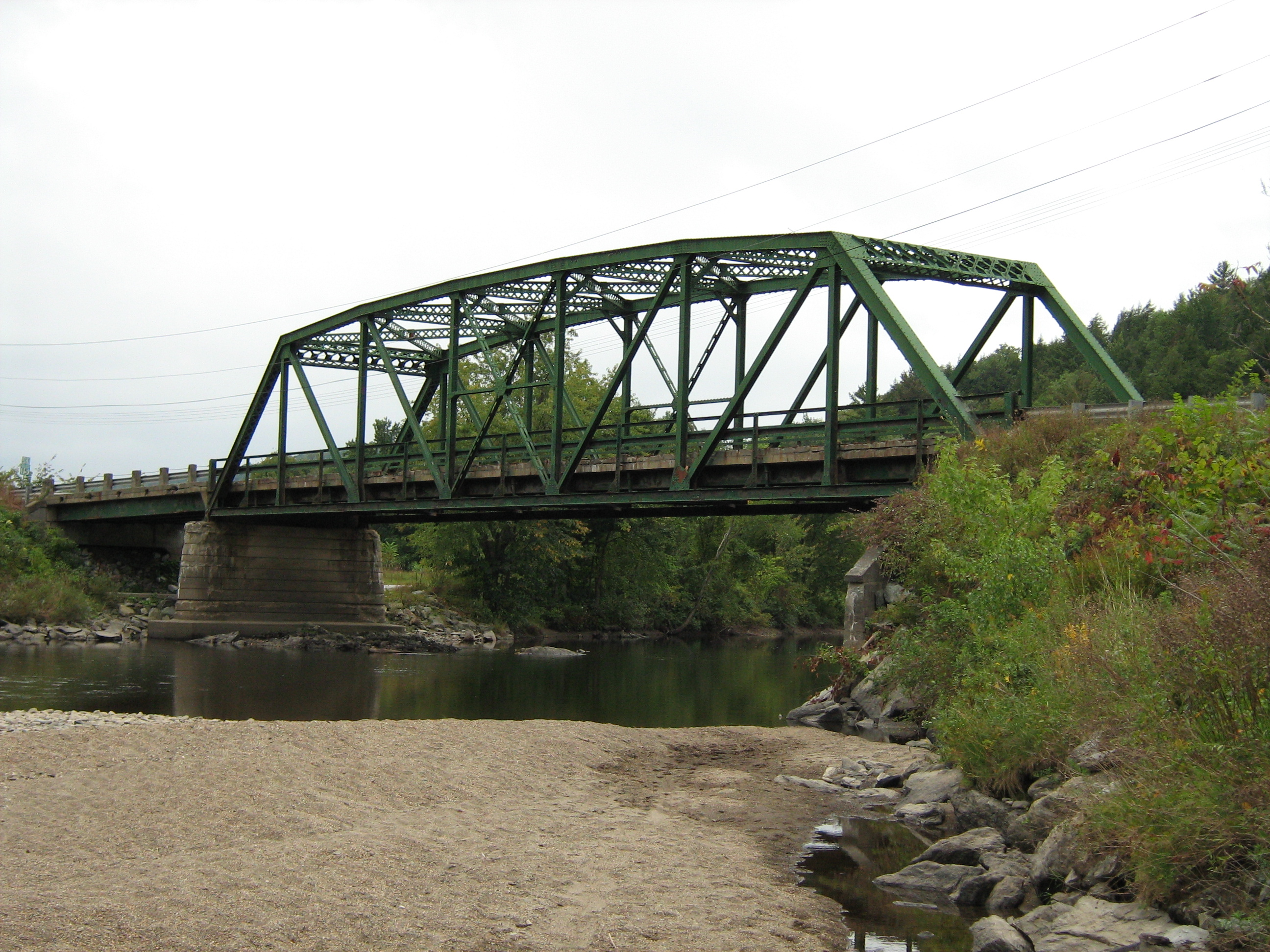
- The historic bridge in 2008

- Location within Vermont Location within the United States
- Location: VT 108 over the Lamoille River, Cambridge, Vermont
- Coordinates: 44°38′57″N 72°49′51″W
- Area: less than one acre
- Built: 1931
- Built by: American Bridge Company
- Architectural style: Parker through truss
- MPS: Metal Truss, Masonry, and Concrete Bridges in Vermont MPS
- NRHP reference No.: 91001606
- Added to NRHP: November 14, 1991

The Jeffersonville Bridge is a steel girder bridge carrying Vermont Route 108 across the Lamoille River, just north of the village of Jeffersonville, Vermont. It was built in 2014, replacing a Parker through truss bridge built in 1931; the latter bridge was listed on the National Register of Historic Places in 1991.

== Setting ==
The bridge is set just north of Jeffersonville, and carries Vermont Route 108 across the Lamoille River, providing access to Bakersfield via Vermont Route 108 and Waterville via Vermont Route 109. On the south side of the bridge it is connected to a rotary forming the junction of Vermont Route 108 and Vermont Route 15, which runs generally east-west parallel to the river.

== Historic bridge ==
The 1931 Jeffersonville Bridge was a Parker through truss structure, with steel girder approaches at both ends. It rested on concrete abutment, and was 150 feet (46 m) long, carrying two lanes of traffic and a pedestrian walkway; the latter was cantilevered on the outside of one of the trusses. The total length of the bridge was about 200 feet (61 m). It had a deck of concrete laid on steel I-beam stringers. The bridge was built in 1931 by the American Bridge Company, and was built using standards and practices adopted by the state after its devastating 1927 floods. Although the bridge rebuilding program after that flood formally ended in 1930, this bridge was built applying the same principles for selection of bridge type (based on the length of the span) and construction practices. The bridge was replaced in 2014 by the present structure.

== See also ==
- National Register of Historic Places listings in Lamoille County, Vermont
- List of bridges documented by the Historic American Engineering Record in Vermont
- List of bridges on the National Register of Historic Places in Vermont
