= Church Street Covered Bridge =

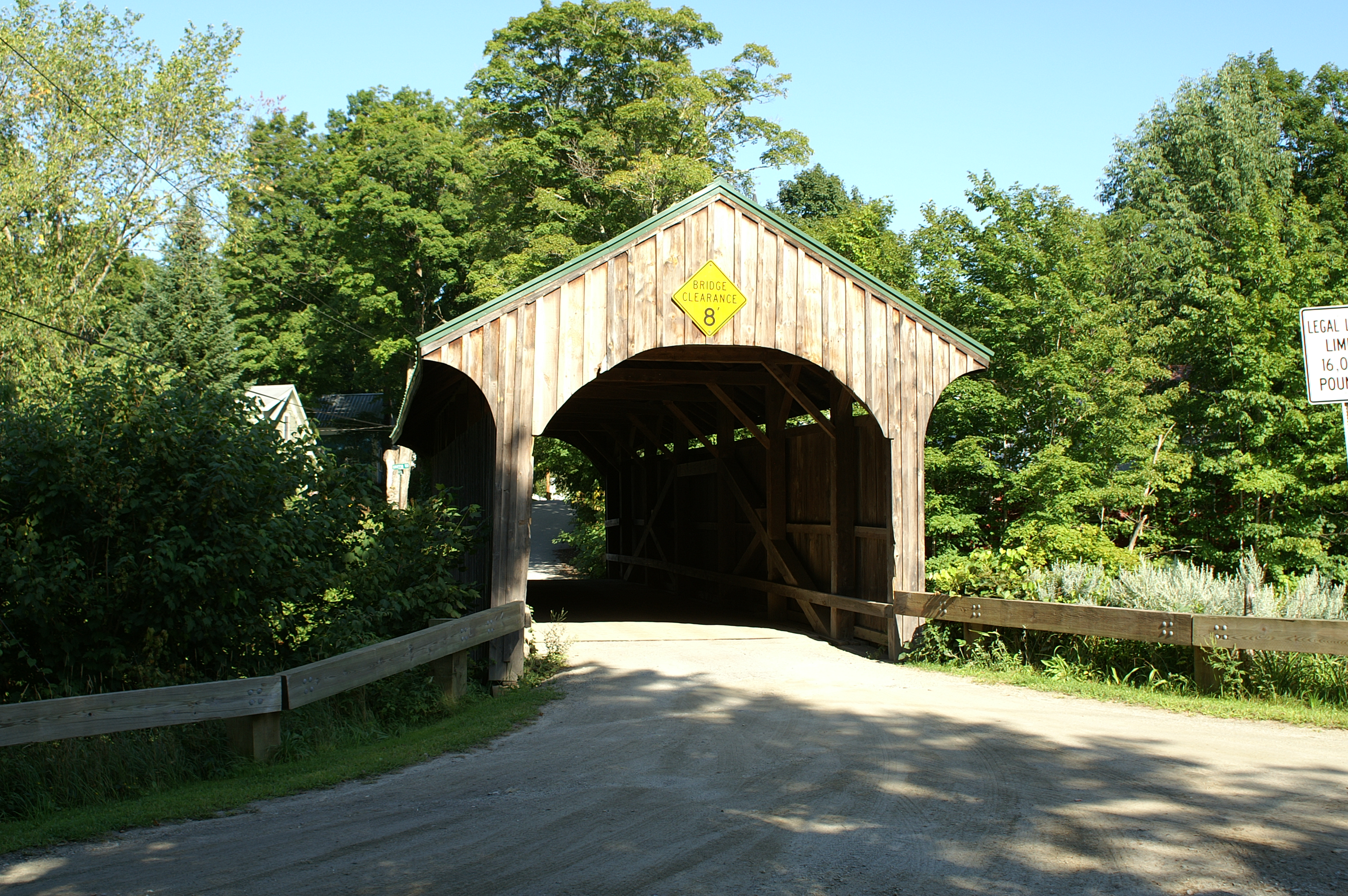
- Coordinates: 44°41′24″N 72°46′16″W
- Carries: Automobile
- Crosses: North Branch Lamoille River aka Kelly River
- Locale: Waterville, Vermont
- Maintained by: Town of Waterville
- ID number: VT-08-13

Characteristics
- Design: Covered, Queen post
- Material: Wood
- Total length: 61.1 ft (18.6 m)
- Width: 12.2 ft (3.7 m)
- No. of spans: 1
- Load limit: 8 tons
- Clearance above: 8 ft (2.4 m)

History
- Constructed by: unknown
- Construction end: 1877
- Church Street Covered Bridge
- U.S. National Register of Historic Places
- U.S. Historic district – Contributing property
- Location within Vermont Location within the United States
- Coordinates: 44°41′25″N 72°46′16″W
- Area: 1 acre (0.40 ha)
- Built: 1877
- Part of: Waterville Village Historic District (ID07001026)
- NRHP reference No.: 74000234

Significant dates
- Added to NRHP: December 16, 1974
- Designated CP: September 28, 2007

The Church Street Covered Bridge, also called the Village Covered Bridge, is a wooden covered bridge that crosses the North Branch of the Lamoille River (also known as the Kelly River) in Waterville, Vermont off State Route 109. Built in the late 19th century, it is one of five covered bridges in a space of about five miles that cross the North Branch Lamoille. It was listed on the National Register of Historic Places in 1974.

== Description and history ==
The Church Street Bridge is located in the central village of Waterville, just west of the Waterville Union Church and the junction of Church Street with Vermont Route 109. It is a single-span Queen post truss design, 61 feet (19 m) long and 15 feet (4.6 m) wide, with a roadway width of 12.5 feet (3.8 m), carrying one lane of traffic. It has a gabled metal roof, and its exterior is clad in vertical board siding which extends around to the insides of the portals. The siding on the sides ends short of the roof, leaving an open strip. It rests on abutments of dry laid stone capped with concrete. The trusses incorporate iron rods extending from the top of the diagonal bracing to the bottom chords. The bridge deck is wooden planking laid over steel I-beams, which carry the active load.

The bridge was built about 1877 by an unknown builder. Along with two bridges in Waterville and two more in neighboring Belvidere, it is one of five covered bridges in a five-mile span of the North Branch Lamoille River, representing one of the densest concentrations of bridges over a single body of water in the state.

In 1967, the back wheels of a truck fell through the floor. Subsequently, steel I-beams were installed under the bridge. In 1970, the bridge survived a fire at a nearby house when firefighters hosed it down to prevent it from catching. In 2000, it was completely rebuilt.

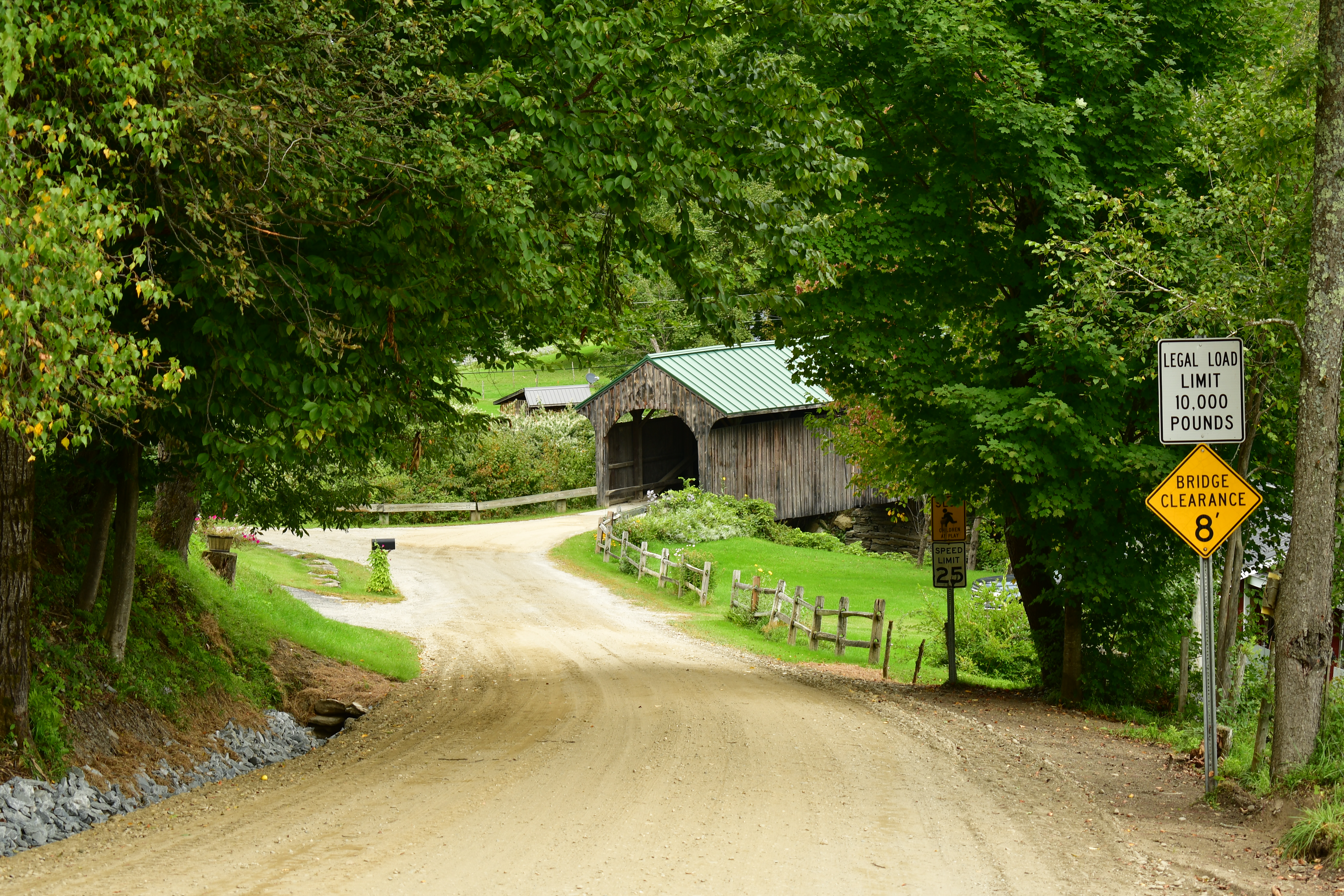

== See also ==
- List of covered bridges in Vermont
- National Register of Historic Places listings in Lamoille County, Vermont
- List of bridges on the National Register of Historic Places in Vermont
