= National Register of Historic Places listings in Lamoille County, Vermont =

Location of Lamoille County in Vermont

This is a list of the National Register of Historic Places listings in Lamoille County, Vermont.

This is intended to be a complete list of the properties and districts on the National Register of Historic Places in Lamoille County, Vermont, United States. Latitude and longitude coordinates are provided for many National Register properties and districts; these locations may be seen together in a map.

There are 32 properties and districts listed on the National Register in the county.

This National Park Service list is complete through NPS recent listings posted December 19, 2025.

Contents: Counties in Vermont
Addison - Bennington - Caledonia - Chittenden - Essex - Franklin - Grand Isle - Lamoille - Orange - Orleans - Rutland - Washington - Windham - Windsor

== Current listings ==
	Name on the Register	Image	Date listed	Location	City or town	Description
1	Bridge 6	Bridge 6	December 20, 2007 (#07001300)	Railroad St. 44°38′03″N 72°41′05″W	Johnson	
2	Cambridge Meetinghouse	Cambridge Meetinghouse	February 6, 1981 (#81000077)	85 Church St. 44°38′36″N 72°49′53″W	Jeffersonville	Former multi-denominational church is now the Cambridge Town Offices and US Post Office
3	Cambridge Village Historic District		January 2, 2026 (#100012484)	Inclusive of VT Route 15, Old Route 15, South Main Street, North Main Street, Mansfield A venue, Railroad Street, Lower Pleasant Valley Road, and Reservoir Road; 44°38′42″N 72°52′41″W	Cambridge	
4	Elmore State Park	Elmore State Park	March 29, 2002 (#02000279)	856 VT 12; 44°32′16″N 72°32′34″W	Elmore	
5	Fisher Covered Railroad Bridge	Fisher Covered Railroad Bridge	October 1, 1974 (#74000222)	Southeast of Wolcott, over the Lamoille River; 44°31′56″N 72°25′43″W	Wolcott	
6	Gates Farm Covered Bridge	Gates Farm Covered Bridge	November 19, 1974 (#74000223)	Off VT 15, over the Seymour River; 44°38′44″N 72°52′23″W	Cambridge	
7	Gold Brook Covered Bridge	Gold Brook Covered Bridge	October 1, 1974 (#74000224)	South of Stowe; 44°26′25″N 72°40′49″W	Stowe	
8	Grist Mill Covered Bridge	Grist Mill Covered Bridge	June 13, 1974 (#74000225)	East of Cambridge over the Brewster River; 44°38′11″N 72°49′32″W	Cambridge	
9	Jaynes Covered Bridge	Jaynes Covered Bridge	October 1, 1974 (#74000226)	Northeast of Waterville, over the North Branch of the Lamoille River; 44°42′43″N 72°45′23″W	Waterville	
10	Jeffersonville Bridge	Jeffersonville Bridge	November 14, 1991 (#91001606)	VT 108 over the Lamoille River; 44°38′57″N 72°49′51″W	Cambridge	Replaced in 2014.
11	Jeffersonville Historic District	Jeffersonville Historic District	April 10, 1987 (#86002929)	Church, Main, Maple, and School Sts., Carlton Ave., VT 108, and Brewster Ave. 44°38′42″N 72°49′43″W	Cambridge	
12	Johnson Railroad Depot	Johnson Railroad Depot	November 28, 1980 (#80000336)	Railroad St. 44°37′54″N 72°41′13″W	Johnson	Probably demolished.
13	Lake Elmore Historic District		October 5, 2023 (#100009447)	VT 12, between Westphal and Greaves Hill Rds. 44°32′28″N 72°31′26″W	Elmore	
14	Lamoille County Courthouse	Lamoille County Courthouse	January 11, 1996 (#95001497)	Main St. 44°35′35″N 72°37′04″W	Hyde Park	
15	Lamoille River Route 15-A Bridge	Lamoille River Route 15-A Bridge	November 14, 1991 (#91001607)	VT 15-A over the Lamoille River; 44°33′51″N 72°34′01″W	Morristown	Pratt through truss bridge built in 1928; dismantled in 2007.
16	Mill Covered Bridge	Mill Covered Bridge	November 19, 1974 (#74000227)	Off VT 109 over the North Branch of the Lamoille River; 44°44′37″N 72°44′29″W	Belvidere	
17	Montgomery Covered Bridge	Montgomery Covered Bridge	October 18, 1974 (#74000228)	Northeast of Waterville over the North Branch of the Lamoille River; 44°42′20″N 72°45′39″W	Waterville	
18	Morgan Covered Bridge	Morgan Covered Bridge	November 19, 1974 (#74000229)	Off VT 109, over the North Branch of the Lamoille River; 44°44′36″N 72°43′37″W	Belvidere	
19	Morrisville Historic District	Morrisville Historic District	January 19, 1983 (#83003210)	Portland, Main, Railroad and Foundry Sts.; also Portland, Lower Main, Upper Main, Railroad, and Foundry Sts. 44°33′45″N 72°35′59″W	Morrisville	Second set of boundaries represents a boundary increase
20	Moscow Village Historic District		July 31, 2008 (#08000744)	Moscow Rd., Shaw Hill Rd., Adams Mill Rd., and River Rd. 44°26′28″N 72°42′53″W	Stowe	
21	Nye Block	Nye Block	August 19, 1977 (#77000144)	Main and Railroad Sts. 44°38′07″N 72°40′54″W	Johnson	Destroyed by fire in 1986.
22	Peoples Academy-Copley Building, Grout Observatory and Community Bandshell	Peoples Academy-Copley Building, Grout Observatory and Community Bandshell	March 7, 1996 (#96000255)	5 Copley Ave. 44°33′45″N 72°35′27″W	Morristown	
23	Poland Covered Bridge	Poland Covered Bridge	October 9, 1974 (#74000230)	Off VT 15, over the Lamoille River; 44°39′04″N 72°48′54″W	Cambridge Junction	Officially, Cambridge Junction Bridge (see sign). Poland was a retired judge who led a lawsuit against the town to have the bridge built.
24	Power House Covered Bridge	Power House Covered Bridge	October 9, 1974 (#74000231)	Off VT 100C, over the Gihon River; 44°38′10″N 72°40′14″W	Johnson	
25	Red Covered Bridge	Red Covered Bridge	October 16, 1974 (#74000232)	Southwest of Morristown, over Sterling Brook; 44°31′07″N 72°40′40″W	Morristown	
26	Scribner Covered Bridge	Scribner Covered Bridge	October 1, 1974 (#74000233)	East of Johnson over the Gihon River; 44°38′20″N 72°38′57″W	Johnson	
27	Stowe CCC Side Camp		February 14, 2002 (#02000027)	6992 Mountain Rd. 44°31′34″N 72°46′37″W	Stowe	
28	Stowe Village Historic District	Stowe Village Historic District	November 15, 1978 (#78000236)	VT 100 and VT 108; 44°27′58″N 72°41′09″W	Stowe	
29	Valley Hall		June 10, 2022 (#100007829)	5503 VT 100; 44°40′14″N 72°35′58″W	Hyde Park	
30	Village Covered Bridge	Village Covered Bridge	December 16, 1974 (#74000234)	Over the North Branch of the Lamoille River; 44°41′24″N 72°46′16″W	Waterville	
31	Waterman Covered Bridge	Waterman Covered Bridge	June 13, 1974 (#74000235)	South of Johnson over Waterman Brook; 44°36′33″N 72°41′04″W	Johnson	Collapsed in 1982.
32	Waterville Village Historic District	Waterville Village Historic District	September 28, 2007 (#07001026)	VT 109, Oakes Rd., Church St., Griffin Rd., Fox Hill Rd., Beals Hill Rd., and Lapland Rd. 44°41′25″N 72°46′10″W	Waterville	

== See also ==
- List of National Historic Landmarks in Vermont
- National Register of Historic Places listings in Vermont
