= Jaynes Covered Bridge =

- U.S. National Register of Historic Places
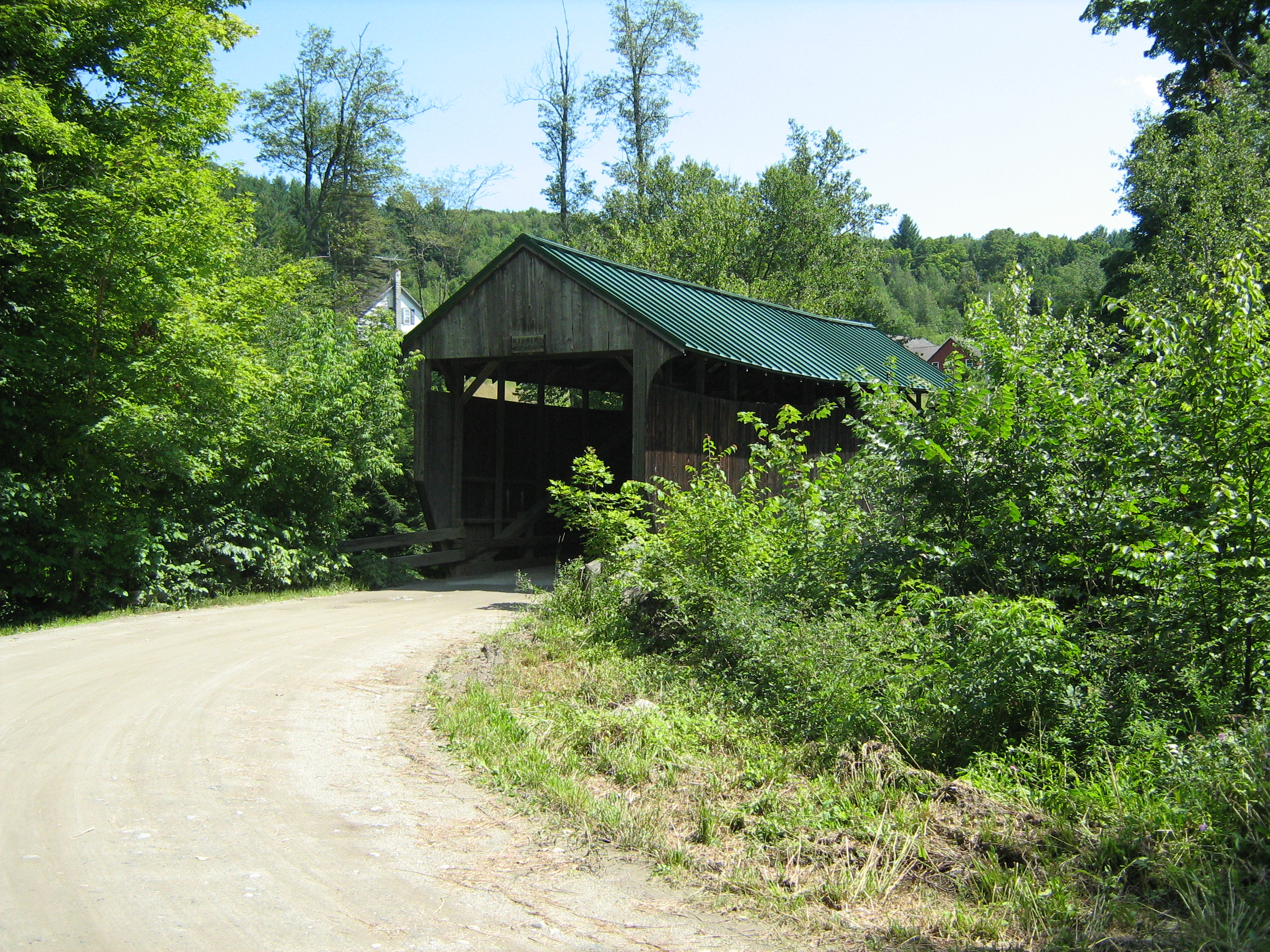

- Location within Vermont Location within the United States
- Location: Codding Hollow Rd., Waterville, Vermont
- Coordinates: 44°42′43″N 72°45′23″W
- Area: 1 acre (0.40 ha)
- Built: 1877
- NRHP reference No.: 74000226
- Added to NRHP: October 1, 1974

The Jaynes Covered Bridge is a historic covered bridge, carrying Codding Hollow Road across the North Branch Lamoille River in Waterville, Vermont. Built in 1877, it is one of three 19th-century covered bridges in the town, and one of five to span the North Branch Lamoille in a five-mile span. It was listed on the National Register of Historic Places in 1974.

== Description and history ==
The Jaynes Covered Bridge stands in northern Waterville, a short way east of Vermont Route 109 on Codding Hill Road. It spans the North Branch Lamoille River, which flows south through the village of Waterville to the main branch of the river further south. The bridge is a single-span queen post truss structure, 56.5 feet (17.2 m) long and 15 feet (4.6 m) wide, with a roadway width of 12 feet (3.7 m) (one lane). It is covered by a gabled metal roof, and its exterior is finished in vertical board siding which stops short of the eaves. The bridge deck has been replaced by steel I-beams covered with wooden planking, so the trusses now only carry the superstructure. The joints between the truss posts and diagonals have also been reinforced with steel plating.

The bridge was built about 1877; its builder is unknown. It is one three period bridges in the town (all spanning the same river). Along with another two in neighboring Belvidere, this assemblage of bridges makes for one of the state's highest concentrations of bridges on a single waterway.

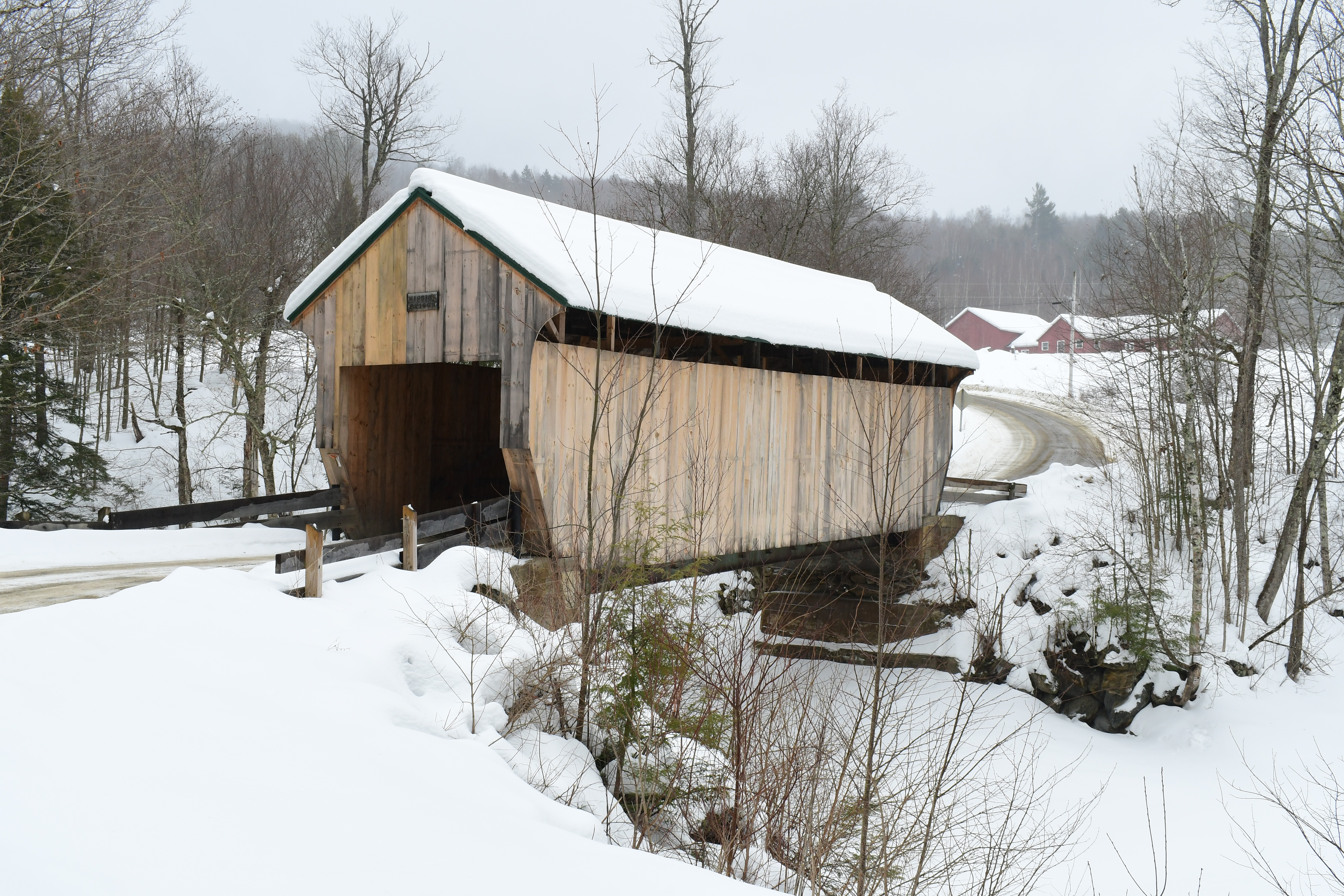

== See also ==
- List of covered bridges in Vermont
- National Register of Historic Places listings in Lamoille County, Vermont
- List of bridges on the National Register of Historic Places in Vermont
