= Poland Covered Bridge =

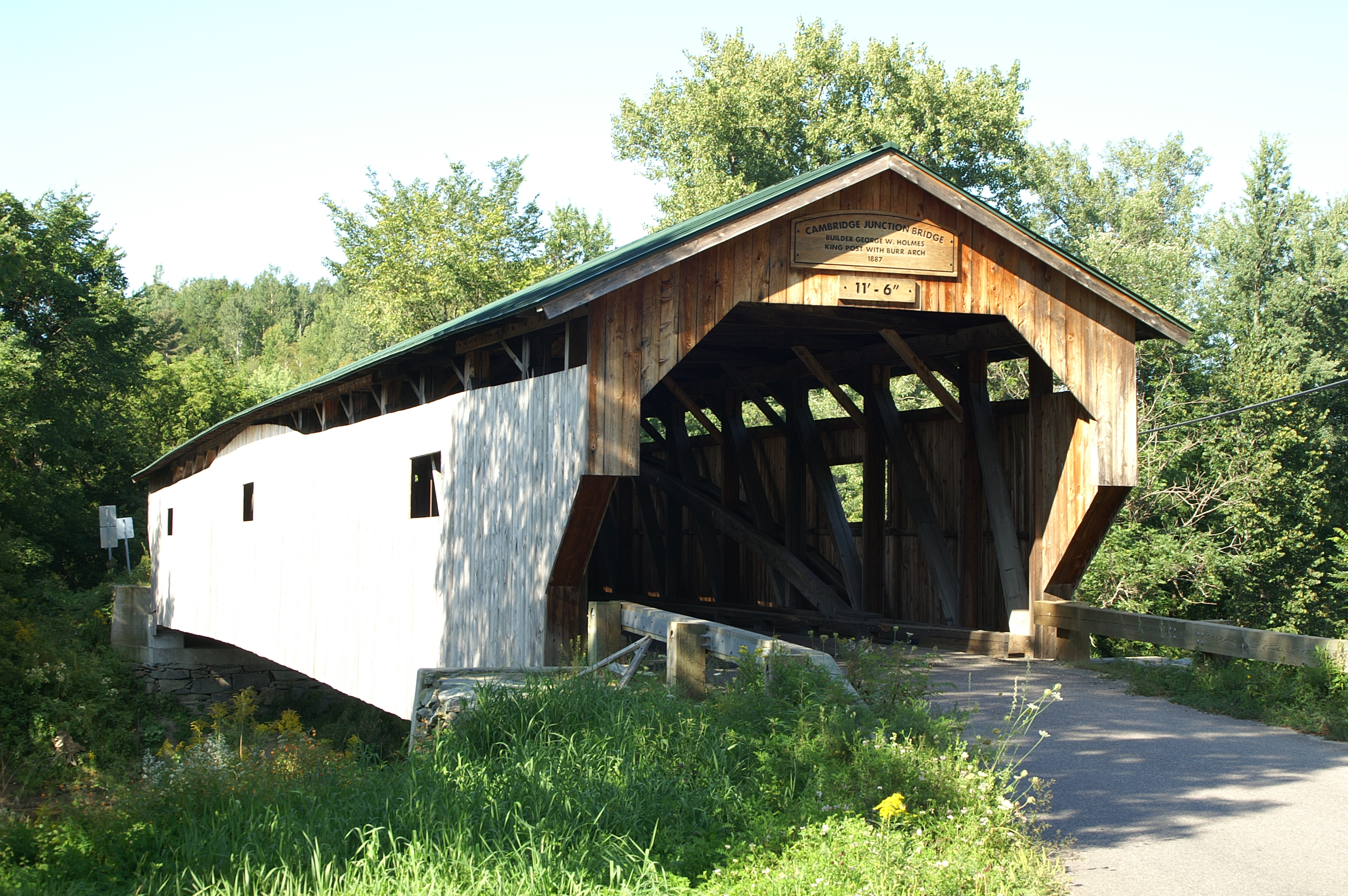
- Bridge in U.S. state of Vermont
- Coordinates: 44°39′04″N 72°48′50″W
- Carries: Automobile
- Crosses: Lamoille River
- Locale: Cambridge, Vermont
- Maintained by: Town of Cambridge
- ID number: VT-08-02

Characteristics
- Design: Covered, Burr arch
- Material: Wood
- Total length: 152.9 ft (46.60 m)
- Width: 15.7 ft (4.79 m)
- No. of spans: 1
- Load limit: 3 tons
- Clearance above: 11.5 ft (3.51 m)

History
- Constructed by: George W. Holmes
- Construction end: 1887
- Poland Covered Bridge
- U.S. National Register of Historic Places
- Location within Vermont Location within the United States
- Coordinates: 44°39′04″N 72°48′52″W
- Area: 1 acre (0.4 ha)
- NRHP reference No.: 74000230
- Added to NRHP: October 9, 1974

The Poland Covered Bridge, also known as the Junction Covered Bridge or the Cambridge Junction Covered Bridge, (Note: As stated on the sign affixed to the bridge, and State of Vermont Historical marker) is a covered bridge that carries Cambridge Junction Road across the Lamoille River off State Route 15 in Cambridge, Vermont. It was listed on the National Register of Historic Places in 1974. The bridge is of Burr arch design, built by George W. Holmes in 1887.

== Name ==
The bridge was named for a local official, Judge Poland, and was a controversial issue in 1888:

"Judge Poland has caused the Town of Cambridge to be inflicted with a bridge and a road at an expense of from $6,000-$10,000, which, as shown, will be of no material benefit to anyone but himself. It will be known in the future as “Poland’s Bridge,” except to the taxpayers of Cambridge, who will christen it “The Bridge of Sighs.” " –News & Citizen, 1888

Poland did not live to use the bridge, dying in his hayfield the following July.

== Description ==
The Poland Covered Bridge is located a short way east of the village of Jeffersonville. It is oriented roughly north-south across the west-flowing Lamoille River, on Cambridge Junction Road, which connects Vermont Route 15 on the south side of the river with Vermont Route 109 on the north side. The bridge is 152.5 feet (46.5 m) long and 19.5 feet (5.9 m) wide, with a roadway width of 15.5 feet (4.7 m) (one lane). It is supported by flanking Burr trusses, which include laminated arches embedded in the truss structure. The deck is further supported by a laminated beam bolted to its underside. The bridge rests on stone abutments that have been capped in concrete. The exterior is clad in vertical board siding, which extends around to the insides of the portals. On the sides, the siding ends short of the roof, following the curve of the truss arches at the center.

== Recent history ==
Deterioration over time introduced a lean to the bridge, but in 1995, a vehicle struck one of the king posts, which straightened the lean but caused the support system to start failing. Reconstruction on the bridge began in 2003 by Alpine Construction, and it was reopened on July 4, 2004. The project was supported by the National Historic Bridge Program, which provided $1 million to preserve the bridge. The bridge now has short "tire rails" on each side of the traveled lane to prevent vehicles from striking the sides. At last visit, it appears they are working, as they show evidence of being struck.

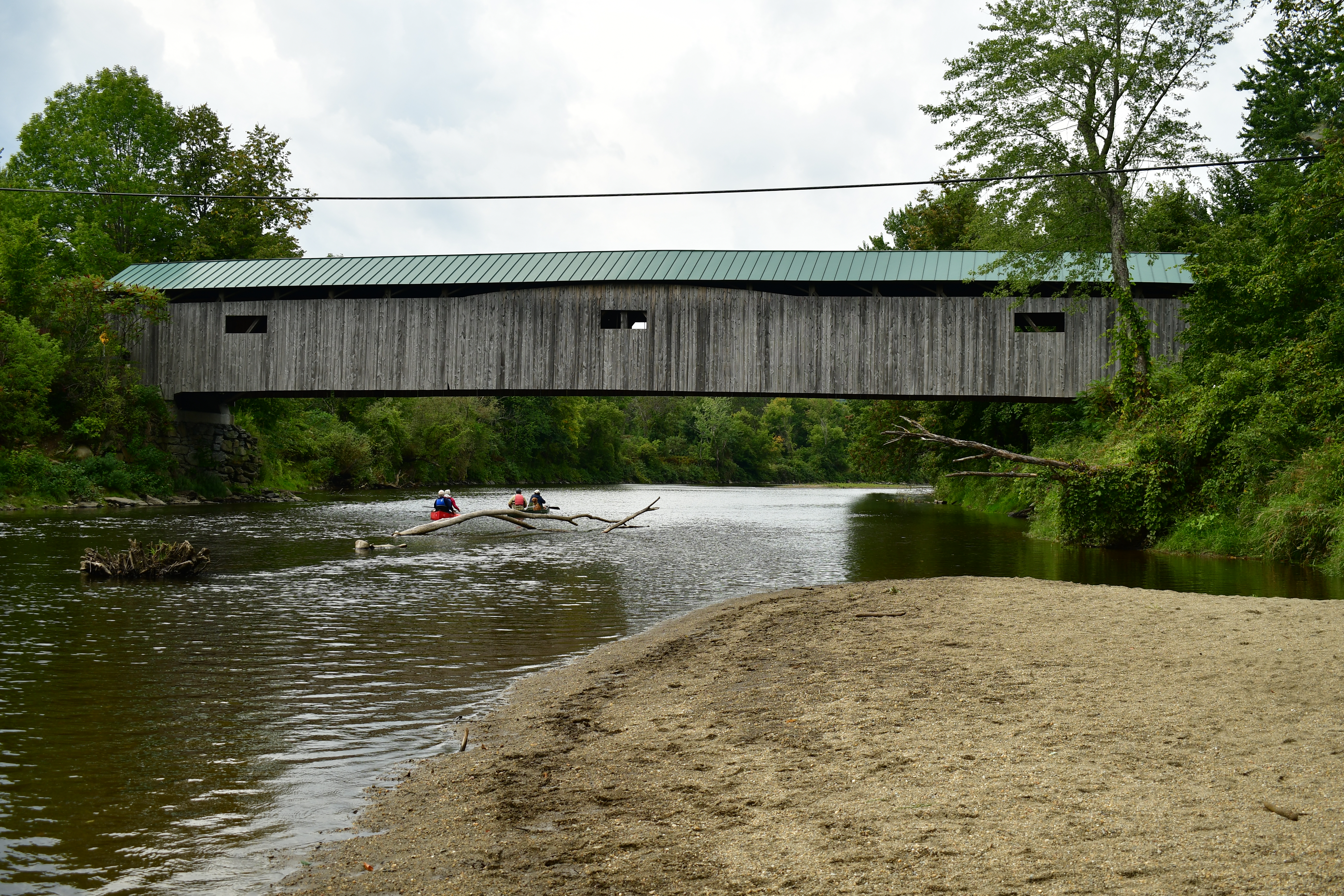

== See also ==
- National Register of Historic Places listings in Lamoille County, Vermont
- List of Vermont covered bridges
- List of bridges on the National Register of Historic Places in Vermont
