= Lamoille River Route 15-A Bridge =

- U.S. National Register of Historic Places
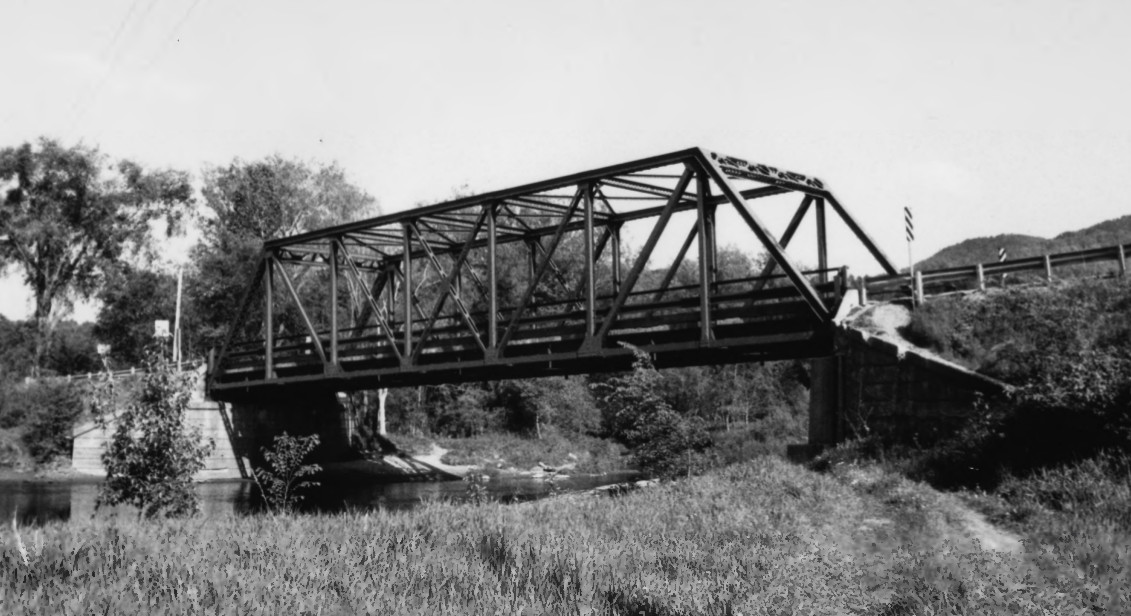
- The old truss bridge in 1985

- Location within Vermont Location within the United States
- Location: VT 15-A over the Lamoille R., Morristown, Vermont
- Coordinates: 44°33′51″N 72°34′1″W
- Area: less than one acre
- Built: 1928
- Built by: Berlin Construction Co.
- Architectural style: Pratt through truss
- MPS: Metal Truss, Masonry, and Concrete Bridges in Vermont MPS
- NRHP reference No.: 91001607
- Added to NRHP: November 14, 1991

The Lamoille River Route 15-A Bridge is a modern steel-and-concrete structure, built in 2013 to carry Vermont Route 15A over the Lamoille River east of Morrisville, Vermont, United States. It was built to replace a metal truss bridge erected there in 1928. The old bridge, of Pratt through truss design, was listed on the National Register of Historic Places in 1991, and was dismantled in 2007.

== Setting ==
The Route 15-A Bridge is located in a rural area east of the town center of Morrisville. Route 15-A runs east paralleling the south bank of the Lamoille River, and provides access from the town center to Vermont Route 15, which runs north of the river. The bridge alignment is roughly east–west, at a point where the west-flowing river bends temporarily to the north.

== Historic bridges ==
Prior to the present bridge, two bridges have stood at this site. The first was a covered bridge, known as the Tenney Covered Bridge, which was built in 1833, and was swept away in Vermont's devastating 1927 floods. The second bridge, an iron Pratt truss structure, was built by the Berlin Construction Company as part of a major effort by the state to rebuild its bridge infrastructure after the flooding. It was built using standardized guidelines for bridges of its length (111 feet (34 m)), and used rolled I-beams as a means to speed fabrication. That bridge was closed and disassembled in 2007, and replaced by a temporary span.

== See also ==
- National Register of Historic Places listings in Lamoille County, Vermont
- List of bridges on the National Register of Historic Places in Vermont
