= Power House Covered Bridge =

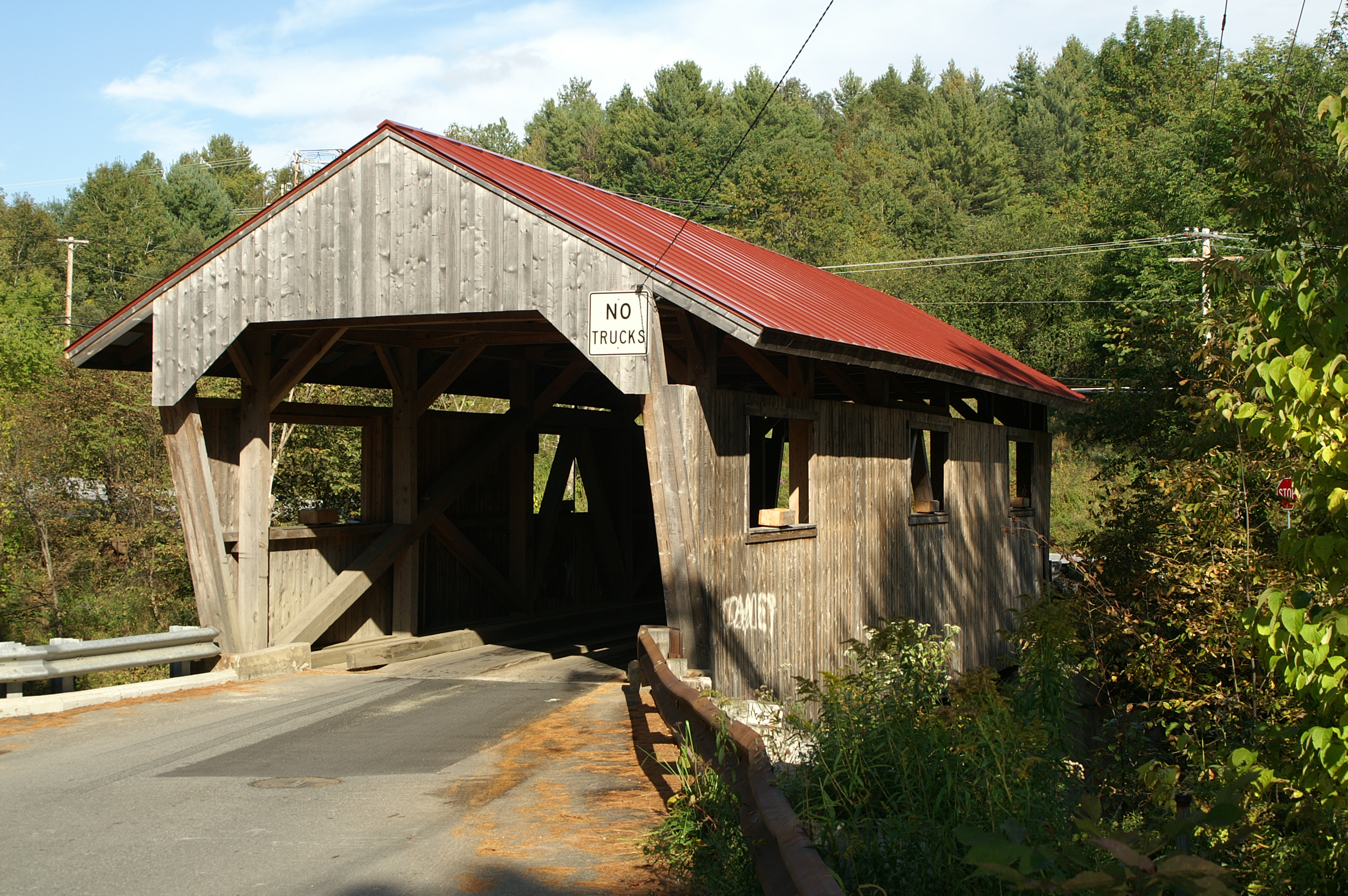
- Bridge in U.S. state of Vermont
- Coordinates: 44°38′10″N 72°40′14″W
- Carries: Automobile
- Crosses: Gihon River
- Locale: Johnson, Vermont
- Maintained by: Town of Johnson
- ID number: VT-08-08

Characteristics
- Design: Covered, Queen post
- Material: Wood
- Total length: 63 ft (19.20 m)
- Width: 14 ft (4.27 m)
- No. of spans: 1
- Load limit: 8 tons
- Clearance above: 8.75 ft (2.67 m)

History
- Constructed by: unknown
- Construction end: 1870
- Power House Covered Bridge
- U.S. National Register of Historic Places
- Location within Vermont Location within the United States
- Coordinates: 44°38′10″N 72°40′14″W
- Area: 1 acre (0.4 ha)
- NRHP reference No.: 74000231
- Added to NRHP: October 9, 1974

The Power House Covered Bridge, also known as the School Street Covered Bridge, is a covered bridge from 1872 that crosses the Gihon River off State Route 100C in Johnson, Vermont, US. It was listed on the National Register of Historic Places in 1974. The bridge's name is from a now obsolete hydroelectric generating station just upstream from it. The bridge is of Queen post truss design by an unknown builder.

== Description ==
The Power House Covered Bridge is located east of the village of Johnson, on School Street just west of Vermont Route 100C. It cross the Gihon River, a tributary of the Lamoille River in a roughly east–west orientation. It is a single-span Queen post truss structure, 63.5 feet (19.4 m) long and 19 feet (5.8 m), with a roadway width of 16 feet (4.9 m) (one lane). The bridge rests on stone abutments faced in concrete, and is covered by a gabled metal roof. The exterior is clad in vertical board siding, which extends around to the insides of the portals. On the sides, the siding does not extend all the way to the roof, leaving an open strip. The trusses include iron rods for stability, and have had metal plates added to some of the joints for increased strength.

== History ==
The bridge was built in 1870, several decades before the eponymous power plant was built upriver. It is one of three surviving 19th-century bridges in Johnson. In 1960, minor repairs were conducted to the abutments, approaches and floor. In 1995, it was recommended to reinforce the deck due to the large number of trucks using the road as a short cut. Steel I beams were installed underneath. In 2000, the bridge was destroyed by a heavy snow load. The roof collapsed and the side walls fell outward into the river below. Because of the installation of the steel I beams, the deck was self-supporting and actually survived. Guardrails were put up on the sides of the deck to keep the bridge open while its fate was decided. In 2002, the contracting company of Blow & Cote was hired to reconstruct the bridge, which was reopened on June 29, 2002.

== See also ==
- National Register of Historic Places listings in Lamoille County, Vermont
- List of Vermont covered bridges
- List of bridges on the National Register of Historic Places in Vermont
