= Gates Farm Covered Bridge =

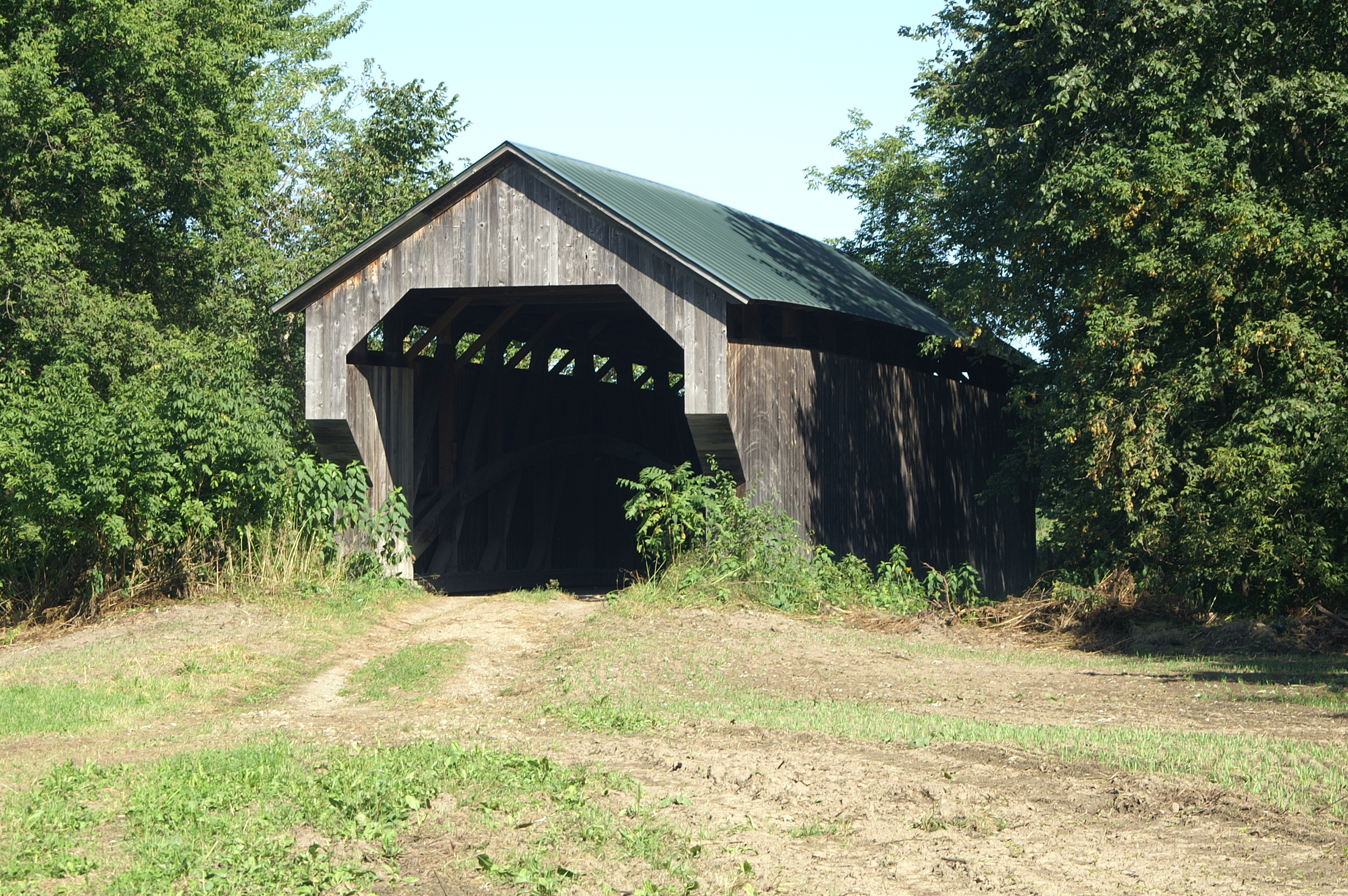
- Bridge in U.S. state of Vermont
- Coordinates: 44°38′45″N 72°52′20″W
- Carries: Farm equipment
- Crosses: Seymour River
- Locale: Cambridge, Vermont
- Maintained by: private owner
- ID number: VT-08-04

Characteristics
- Design: Covered, Burr arch
- Material: Wood
- Total length: 60 ft (18.3 m)
- No. of spans: 1

History
- Constructed by: George W. Holmes
- Construction end: 1897
- Gates Farm Covered Bridge
- U.S. National Register of Historic Places
- Location within Vermont Location within the United States
- Location: Off VT 15, over Seymour River, Cambridge, Vermont
- Coordinates: 44°38′47″N 72°52′22″W
- Area: 1 acre (0.40 ha)
- NRHP reference No.: 74000223
- Added to NRHP: November 19, 1974

The Gates Farm Covered Bridge is a covered bridge that crosses the Seymour River off State Route 15 in Cambridge, Vermont. Built in 1897, it is last bridge to be built during the historic period of covered bridge construction with the Burr arch design. It was listed on the National Register of Historic Places in 1974.

== Description and history ==
The Gates Farm Covered Bridge is located a short way east of the main village of Cambridge, on a farm property on the south side of Vermont Route 15. It is oriented east-west across the Seymour River, a tributary of the Lamoille River, which the roadway roughly parallels. The bridge is a single-span Burr arch truss, 82.5 feet (25.1 m) long and 19.5 feet (5.9 m) wide, with a roadway width of 16 feet (4.9 m). It is covered by a gabled metal roof and rests on concrete abutments. The exterior is clad in vertical board siding which stops short of the eaves, leaving an open strip near the top. The siding extends across the portals and a short way to their interior. The deck is made of wooden planking.

The bridge was built by George W. Holmes in 1897, and is one of only nine surviving Burr trusses in the state. It was originally known as the "Little Covered Bridge", and was located several hundred feet downstream carrying VT 15, near the longer Cambridge Covered Bridge across the Lamoille River. It was moved to its present location in 1950. The Seymour River originally emptied into the Lamoille River further upstream of where it does currently. In 1950, the Seymour River's course was changed so that it no longer crossed the highway and instead emptied downstream of the Cambridge Bridge, making the Little Bridge unneeded. In diverting the river, the Gates family farm became separated from its fields by the new course of the river. The Little Bridge was moved to the Gates farm property over the new course of the Seymour River to restore access to the farm's fields. At that time it then became known as the Gates Farm Covered Bridge. (Incidentally, the Cambridge Covered Bridge was moved and became the Shelburne Museum Covered Bridge).

In 1994, after years of neglect, and with its new location in a flood plain, the bridge suffered deterioration and was removed from its abutments. In 1995 it was restored, in the process, making the interior clearance 18 inches (0.46 m) higher to allow larger farm equipment to pass through. (Note: More information is needed about this restoration.)

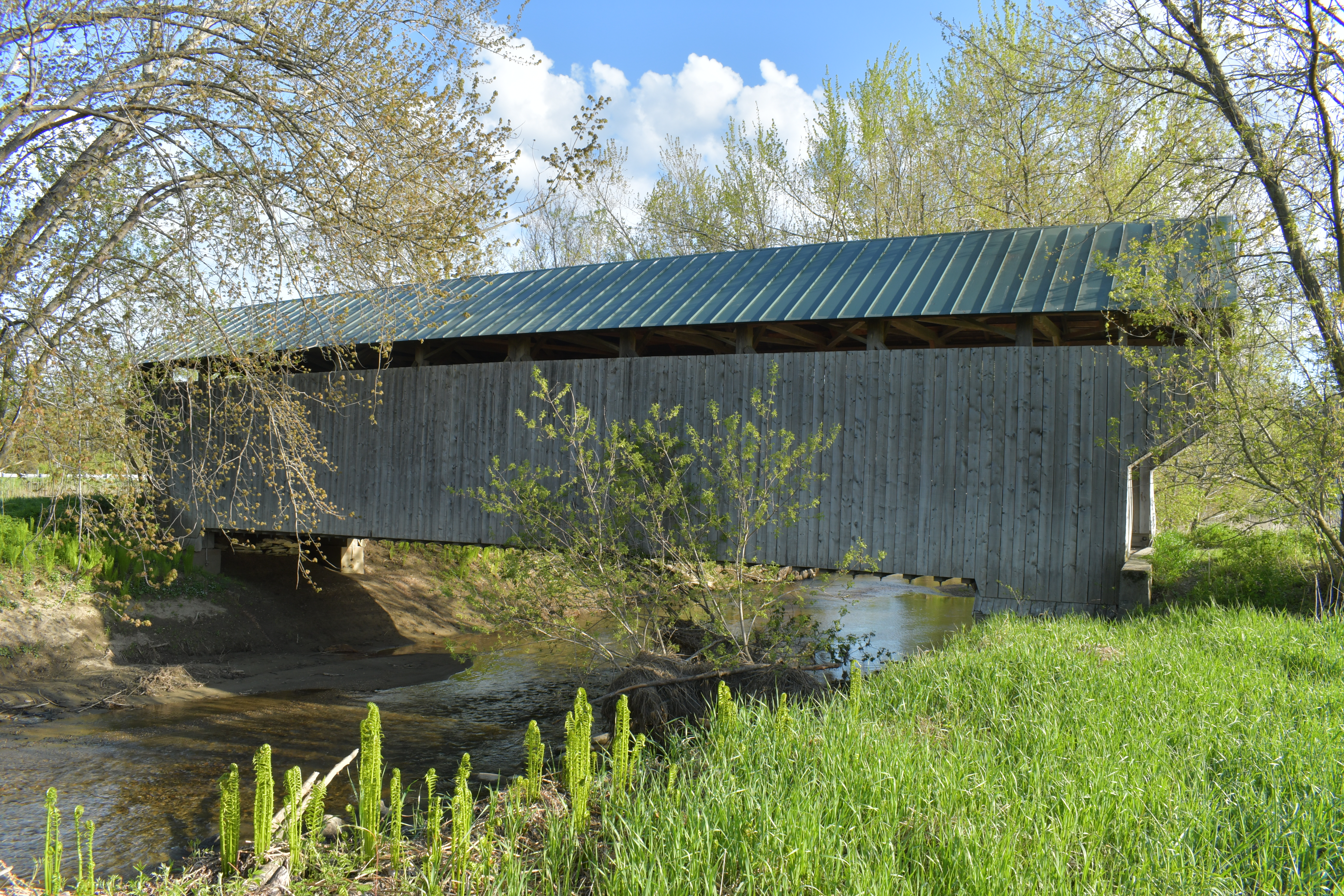

== See also ==
- National Register of Historic Places listings in Lamoille County, Vermont
- List of Vermont covered bridges
- List of bridges on the National Register of Historic Places in Vermont
