= Bridge 6 (Johnson, Vermont) =

- U.S. National Register of Historic Places
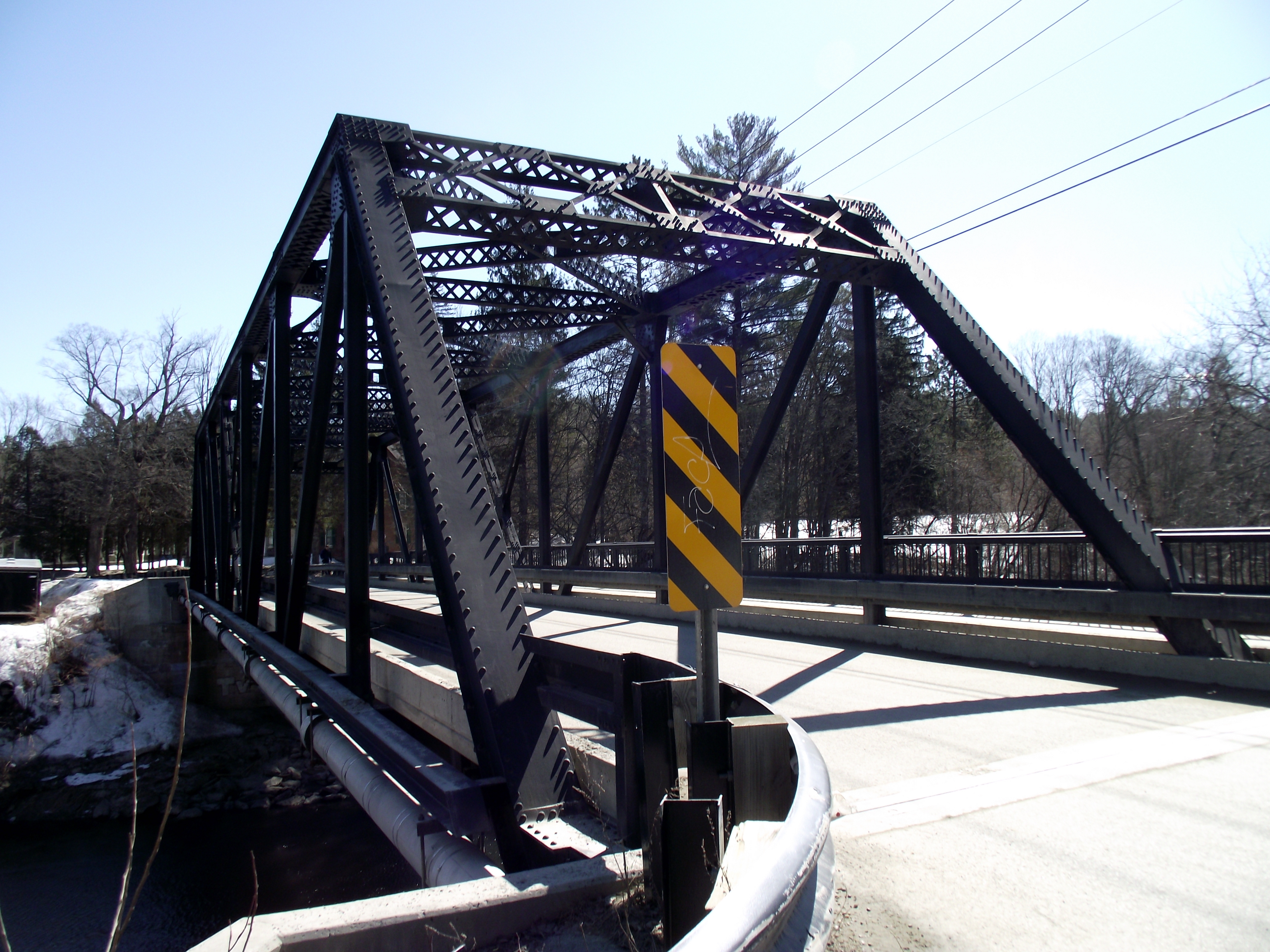

- Location within Vermont Location within the United States
- Location: Railroad St., Johnson, Vermont
- Coordinates: 44°38′3″N 72°41′5″W
- Area: Less than 1 acre (0.40 ha)
- Built: 1928
- Built by: Bethlehem Steel Co.
- Architectural style: Pratt through truss
- MPS: Metal Truss, Masonry, and Concrete Bridges in Vermont MPS
- NRHP reference No.: 07001300
- Added to NRHP: December 20, 2007

The Railroad Street Bridge is a historic Pratt through truss bridge, carrying Railroad Street across the Lamoille River in Johnson, Vermont. It was built in 1928, after the state's devastating 1927 floods, and is one of its few surviving Pratt through truss bridges. It was listed on the National Register of Historic Places in 2007 as Bridge 6.

== Description and history ==
The Railroad Street Bridge is located south of the town center of Johnson, providing access across the Lamoille River to rural areas south of the village, and historically to a railroad line (now the Lamoille Valley Rail Trail. The bridge is a single-span Pratt through truss, with a clear span of 140 feet (43 m) and a width of 23 feet (7.0 m), and rests on concrete abutments. A sidewalk about 5 feet (1.5 m) wide is cantilevered outside the upstream truss. The bridge deck is concrete laid over deck plating on I-beam stringers.

The bridge was built in 1928, its trusses fabricated by the Bethlehem Steel Company. It is one of the state's few surviving Pratt through trusses, and is unusually wide for bridges built after the state's devastating 1927 floods. Bridges have been documented at this site since 1859, although the crossing became important to the community after the railroad service arrived in 1876, and resulted in the creation of a small industrial area near the railroad. The bridge washed away in 1927 was a covered bridge of uncertain construction date. The present bridge was rehabilitated in 2006.

== See also ==
- National Register of Historic Places listings in Lamoille County, Vermont
- List of bridges on the National Register of Historic Places in Vermont
