= Moody Shattuck House =

Historic house in Massachusetts, United States

- U.S. National Register of Historic Places
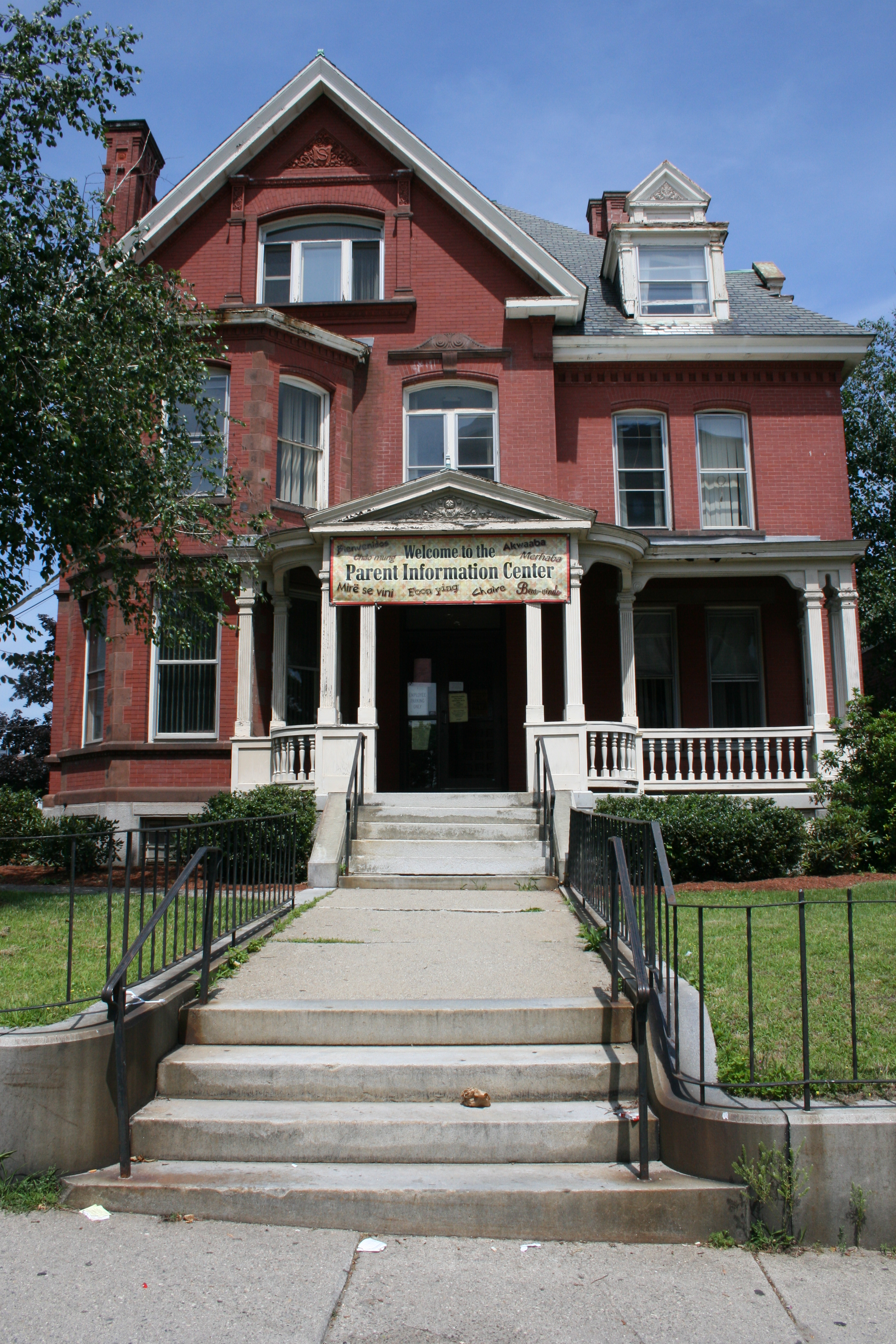

- Location within Massachusetts Location within the United States
- Location: 768 Main St., Worcester, Massachusetts
- Coordinates: 42°15′25″N 71°48′38″W
- Built: 1885
- Architect: Fuller & Delano
- Architectural style: Queen Anne
- MPS: Worcester MRA
- NRHP reference No.: 80000626
- Added to NRHP: March 05, 1980

The Moody Shattuck House is a historic house at 768 Main Street in Worcester, Massachusetts. The Queen Anne style house was constructed in 1885 and added to the National Register of Historic Places in 1980.

Moody Edson Shattuck, founder of the M.E. Shattuck Cigar & Tobacco Company, was born in Waterville, Vermont on May 9, 1835. In 1858 he arrived in Worcester, Massachusetts and purchased a cigar store in the Lincoln House block, moving to the Walker Building two years later. Over the next several decades he would continue to develop his cigar business. At one time, it was one of the largest in New England.

Moody Shattuck married Helen Augusta Prouty on January 12, 1863. He built the house at 768 Main Street in 1885. Moody Shattuck died April 10, 1892. His wife remained in the house after his death. Mrs. Shattuck died in 1907. Both are buried at the Worcester Rural Cemetery.

== See also ==
- National Register of Historic Places listings in southwestern Worcester, Massachusetts
- National Register of Historic Places listings in Worcester County, Massachusetts
