= Jeffersonville Historic District =

Historic district in Vermont, United States

- U.S. National Register of Historic Places
- U.S. Historic district
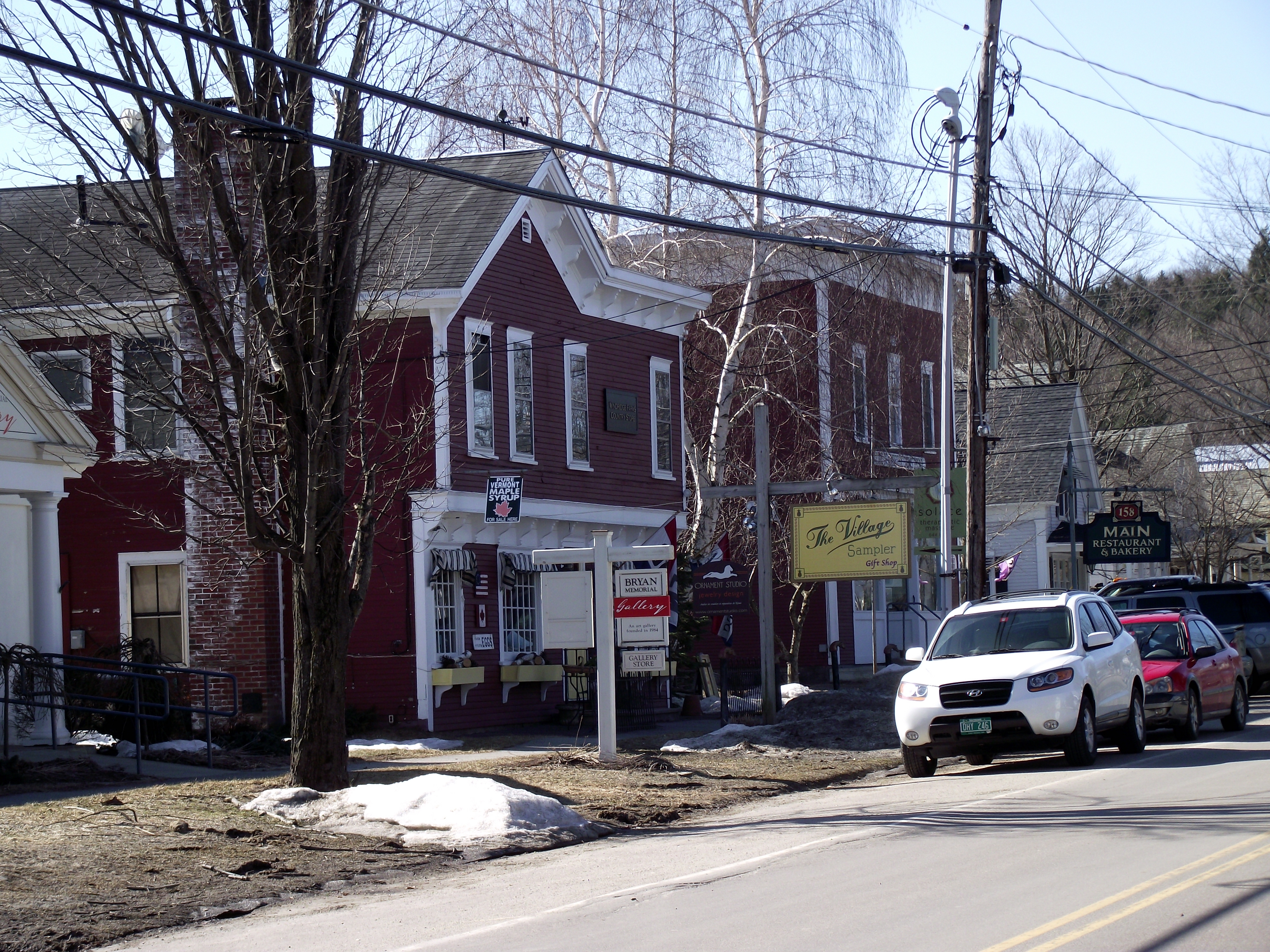

- Location within Vermont Location within the United States
- Location: Church, Main, Maple, and School Sts., Carlton Ave., VT 108, and Brewster Ave., Cambridge, Vermont
- Coordinates: 44°38′42″N 72°49′43″W
- Area: 63 acres (25 ha)
- Architectural style: Colonial Revival, Bungalow/craftsman, Greek Revival
- NRHP reference No.: 86002929
- Added to NRHP: April 10, 1987

The Jeffersonville Historic District encompasses a significant portion of the village of Jeffersonville, the largest in the town of Cambridge, Vermont. The village, long the town's commercial heart, has a well-preserved array of 19th and early-20th century architecture. It was listed on the National Register of Historic Places in 1987.

== Description and history ==
The village of Jeffersonville occupies fertile bottomlands between the Lamoille River, which flows roughly southwest at that point, and the Brewster River, a tributary which flows north into the Lamoille. The village arose in the early 19th century because the Brewster River was well suited to provide water power to industry. Its earliest settler, John Brewster, arrived in the 1780s, and the village was incorporated in 1827. Its 19th-century growth resulted in a significant number of Greek Revival houses. Around the turn of the 20th century the village gained a number of fine Victorian and Colonial Revival buildings.

The historic district is roughly L-shaped, extending west along Church Street and north along Main Street from their meeting point. Maple Street parallels Main Street to the west, and School Street loops off Main Street to the east, providing a simple grid. Most of the district's 67 buildings are historic in character, and are in a wide variety of styles popular in the 19th and early 20th centuries. The only brick buildings in the district are a church, store, and school buildings. Most buildings are 1-1/2 to 2-1/2 stories in height, and their styling is typically vernacular.

== See also ==
- National Register of Historic Places listings in Lamoille County, Vermont
