= Lower Covered Bridge =

Lower Covered Bridge can refer to

- Maple Street Covered Bridge in Fairfax, Vermont
- Montgomery Covered Bridge in Waterville, Vermont
