= Cambridge Meetinghouse =

Historic church in Vermont, United States

- U.S. National Register of Historic Places
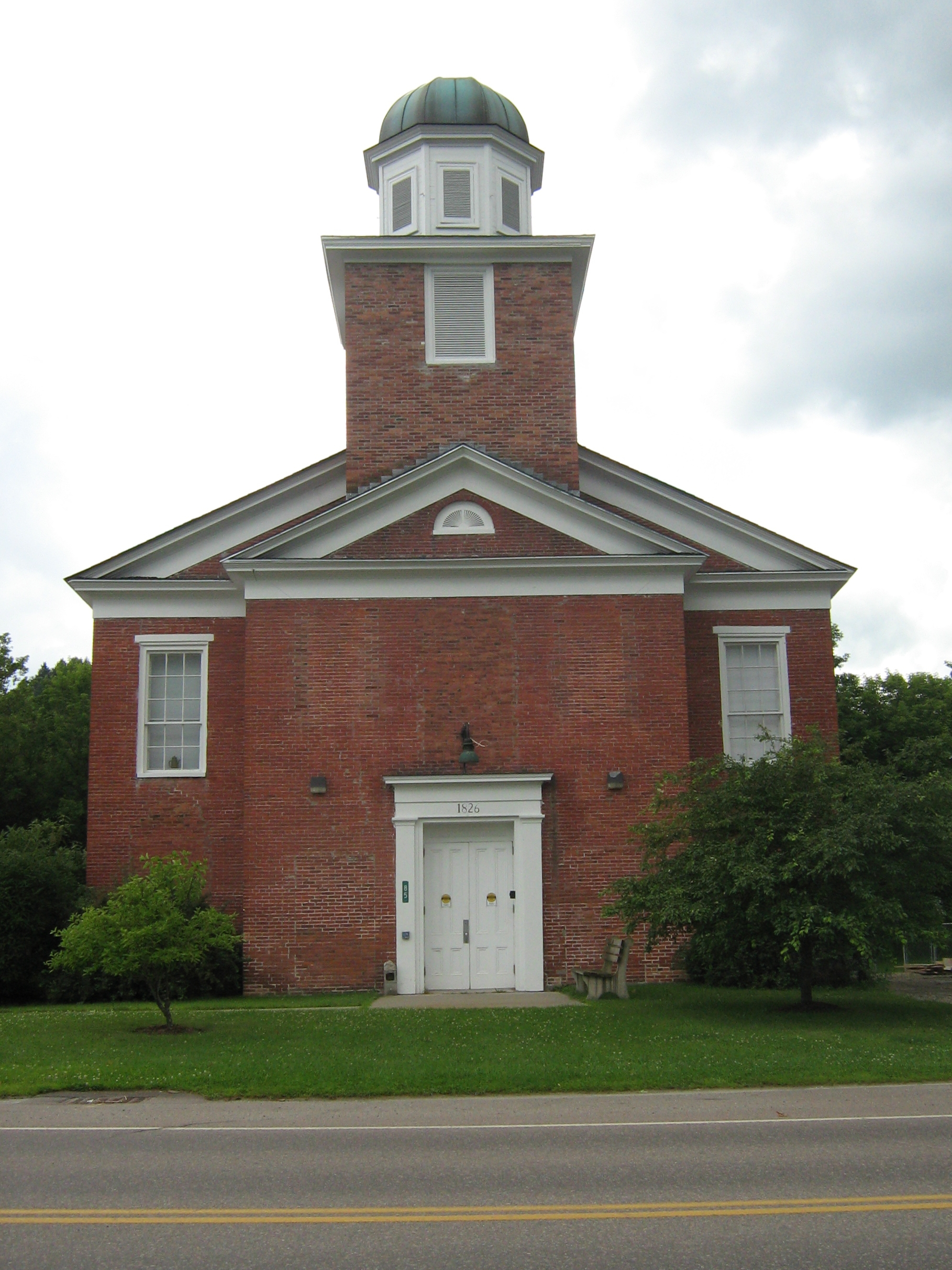
- Front of the meetinghouse

- Location within Vermont Location within the United States
- Location: 85 Church St., Jeffersonville, Vermont
- Coordinates: 44°38′36″N 72°49′53″W
- Area: less than one acre
- Built: 1826
- Architectural style: Colonial Revival, Federal
- NRHP reference No.: 81000077
- Added to NRHP: February 6, 1981

The Cambridge Meetinghouse, also known locally as the Old Brick Church is a historic meetinghouse at 85 Church Street in Jeffersonville, the main village of Cambridge, Vermont. Built in 1826 as a union church for several denominations, it began use as the local town hall in 1866, a use that continued to 1958. It was listed on the National Register of Historic Places in 1981. It presently houses the local post office.

== Description and history ==
The Cambridge Meetinghouse stands in the center of Jeffersonville village, on the south side of Church Street (Vermont Route 108) next to the Smugglers Notch Inn. It is a two-story brick building with a gabled roof. The front facade has a pedimented gable and wide projecting central bay, also with a pedimented gable, that houses the main entrance. The entrance is slightly recessed, and is framed by pilasters and a corniced entablature. There are sash windows on either side of the projecting section on the second level. Rising astride the main roof and the projecting is a square tower, topped by an octagonal belfry and cupola.

The meetinghouse was built in 1826, and is the community's most prominent example of Federal period architecture. It was built to be shared by four separate Christian denominations, and was at the center of sectarian strife in the community. The rise of a religious movement known as Perfectionism took place here, and contributed to the eventual founding of the Oneida Community in New York in the 1840s. Church usage declined in the second half of the 19th century, and in 1866 the town began to use the building for town meetings. The last religious services in this building took place in 1889, by Congregationalists who moved into a new building nearby. The building continued to serve as town hall, its offices occupying the vestry space until 1958. In the early 1900s, an addition was made to the rear to accommodate a stage for use in theatrical performances.

== See also ==
- National Register of Historic Places listings in Lamoille County, Vermont
