= Nye Block =

- U.S. National Register of Historic Places
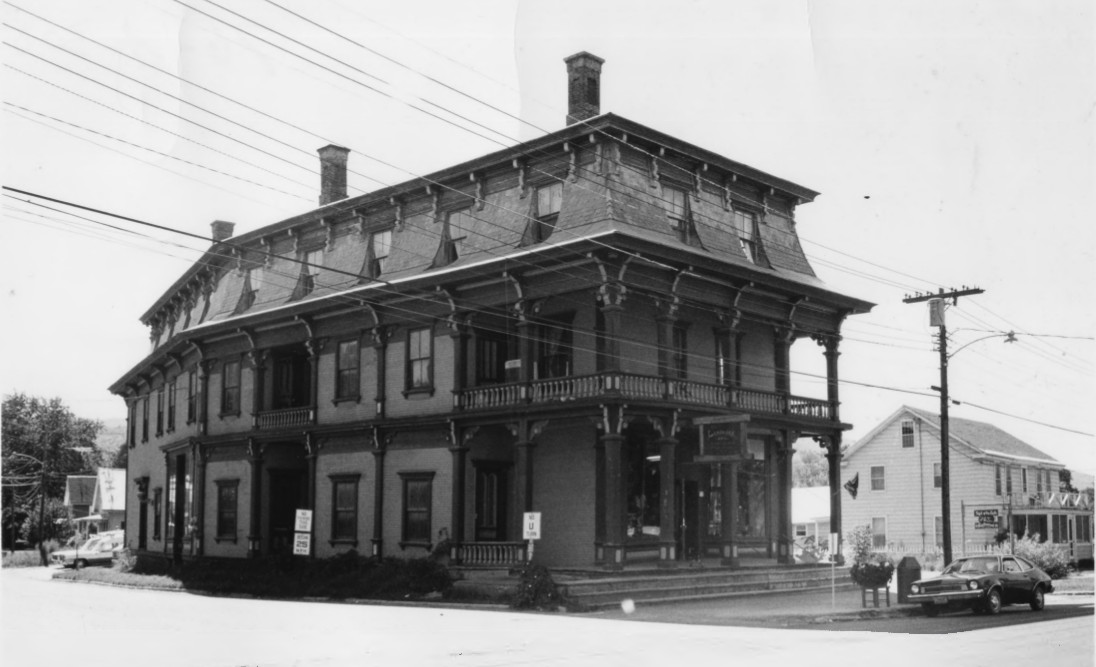
- Photo, 1976

- Location within Vermont Location within the United States
- Location: Main and Railroad Sts., Johnson, Vermont
- Coordinates: 44°38′7″N 72°40′54″W
- Area: less than one acre
- Built: 1868
- Built by: Knight, Leonard
- Architectural style: Second Empire
- NRHP reference No.: 77000144
- Added to NRHP: August 19, 1977

The Nye Block, also known as the Johnson Landmark Building, was a historic commercial building at Main and Railroad Streets in Johnson, Vermont. Built in 1868, it was an elaborate example of Second Empire architecture, occupying a prominent position in the town center. It was destroyed by an arsonist in 1986. It was listed on the National Register of Historic Places in 1977.

== Description and history ==
The Nye Block stood prominently in the center of the village of Johnson, at the southwest corner of Main and Railroad Streets. It was a long 2 1/2-story wood-frame structure, capped with a mansard roof that provided a full third floor in the attic. The building physically dominated the area, as it was the tallest and most ornately decorated structure in the downtown. Its main facade faced Main Street, and it extended over 120 feet (37 m) along Railroad Street, its rear section decreasing in width due to the curvature of the road. The mansard roof had a bracketed cornice at both the steep and shallow-angled portions, and windows recessed into it. An ornate porch extended across the front and partially along the left side, and there was a recessed porch bay midway along the long left side.

The block was built in 1868-69 by Leonard Knight, a local businessman, as a speculative venture in anticipation of the railroad being routed nearby. It was at the time of its construction the most ornate building in the town, and was rare in the state as a particularly good example of vernacular Second Empire architecture. It was destroyed by a suspicious fire in 1986; the building had stood vacant for some time, and rehabilitation possibilities had been under discussion in the town.

== See also ==
- National Register of Historic Places listings in Lamoille County, Vermont
