= Moscow Village Historic District =

Historic district in Vermont, United States

- U.S. National Register of Historic Places
- U.S. Historic district
- Location within Vermont Location within the United States
- Location: Moscow Rd., Shaw Hill Rd., Adams Mill Rd., River Rd., Stowe, Vermont
- Coordinates: 44°26′28″N 72°42′53″W
- Area: 65 acres (26 ha)
- Built: 1822
- Architectural style: Greek Revival, Gothic Revival, Italianate
- NRHP reference No.: 08000744
- Added to NRHP: July 31, 2008

The Moscow Village Historic District encompasses a former 19th-century industrial village in southern Stowe, Vermont. Centered on the Little River at its Moscow Road crossing, the village prospered into the early 20th century as a woodworking center. It was listed on the National Register of Historic Places in 2008.

== Description and history ==
The Moscow Village Historic District is located on the banks of the Little River in the southmost part of the Town of Stowe, Vermont. This unincorporated rural village includes properties north of the river on Moscow Road and Shaw Hill Road and properties south of the river on Adams Mill Road.

The Town of Stowe was first settled in the 1790s. By the early 19th century, three villages grew on the banks of the Little River. Smith's Falls, the southernmost village was named after the dam William Smith built in 1822. The village developed around two industrial sites: a saw and grist mill complex (Seaver sawmill, 1822) built north of the river and a woodworking factory built in 1889 downstream and on the southside of the river (Dillingham Brothers Woodworking Factory, purchased by George F Adams in 1914-1918.)

Smith's Falls took on a second name, Moscow, which was named after 'the bell of Moscow'. This bell was actually a used circular saw blade strung in the Old School House that was struck to announce meetings. By 1886, when the first Post Office appeared in the Village, Moscow formally replaced Smith's Falls as the Village's name. The Village prospered from the surrounding farms, logging, and development of the woodworking industry in Vermont. Woodworking and logging allowed villages to capitalize on the area's rich forests. Post-World War II economic factors accelerated a transition in the Village from a farming, logging, and woodworking community to a Village supported by small commercial and residential uses.

The historic district, like most village centers in Vermont, is built on the river. The Moscow Road Bridge (1844, rebuilt 1949) connects the Village to Route 100, Nebraska Valley, and Trapp Hill Road. The Seaver Sawmill remains in the center of the economic district. South of the river, the District extends along Barnes Hill and Adams Mill Road, roughly paralleling the river west of the bridge. On the north side, it extends westward along Moscow Road, paralleling the river, and eastward along River Road to its junction with Shaw Hill Road. The district contains a mix of residential, industrial, and commercial properties, generally of wood-frame construction and one to two stories in height. The 25 properties in the district also include the original Moscow General Store and first School.

== See also ==
- National Register of Historic Places listings in Lamoille County, Vermont
