= Grist Mill Covered Bridge =

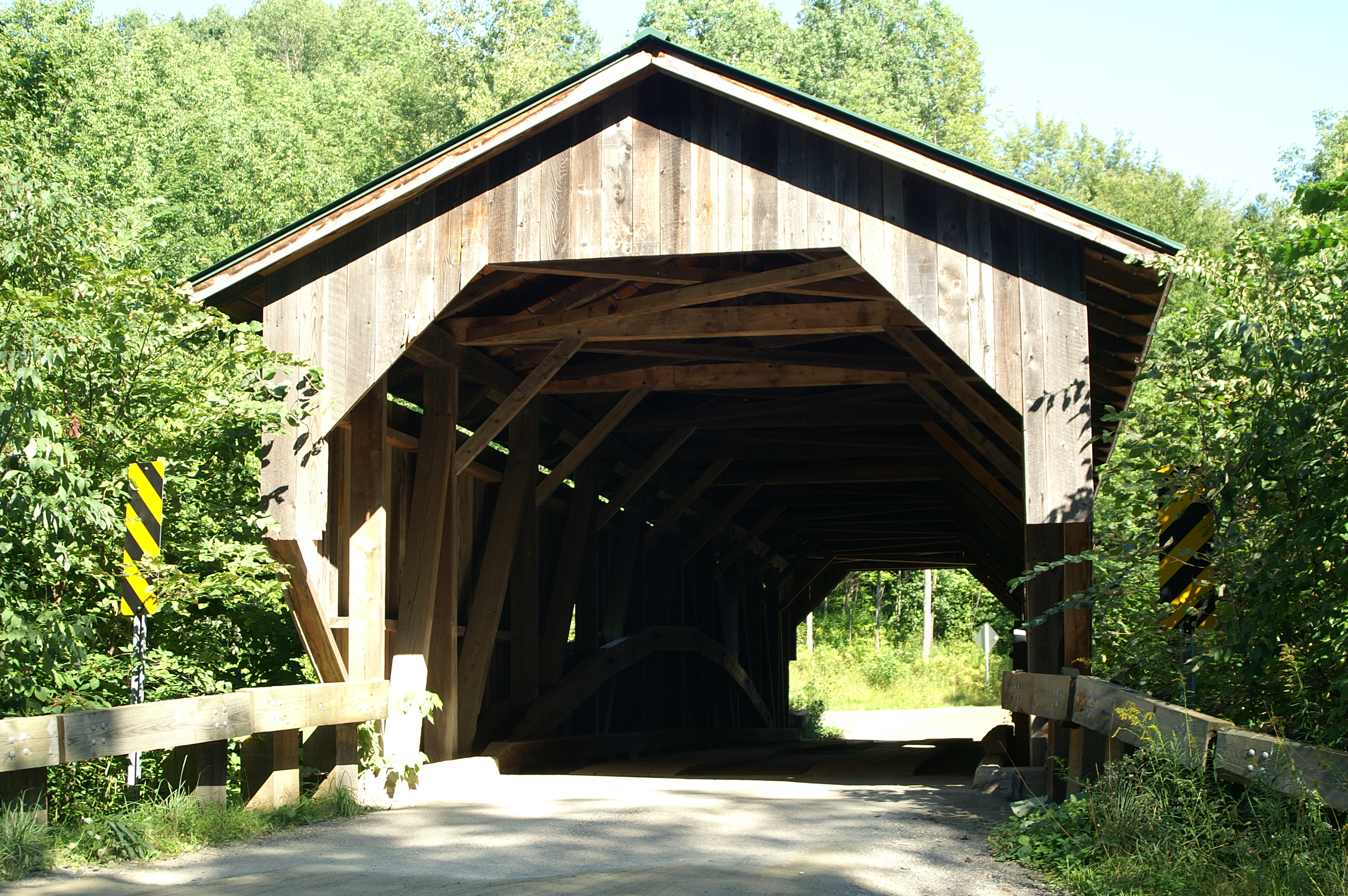
- Coordinates: 44°38′13″N 72°49′30″W
- Carries: Automobile
- Crosses: Brewster River
- Locale: Cambridge, Vermont
- Maintained by: Town of Cambridge
- ID number: VT-08-01

Characteristics
- Design: Covered, Burr arch
- Material: Wood
- Total length: 84.5 ft (25.76 m)
- Width: 13.7 ft (4.18 m)
- No. of spans: 1
- Load limit: 5 tons
- Clearance above: 9.75 ft (2.97 m)

History
- Constructed by: unknown
- Construction end: c.1872
- Grist Mill Covered Bridge
- U.S. National Register of Historic Places
- Location within Vermont Location within the United States
- Coordinates: 44°38′12″N 72°49′30″W
- Area: 1 acre (0.40 ha)
- NRHP reference No.: 74000225
- Added to NRHP: June 13, 1974

The Grist Mill Covered Bridge, also known as the Scott Covered Bridge, the Bryant Covered Bridge, and the Canyon Covered Bridge, is a covered bridge that carries Canyon Road across the Brewster River, off Vermont Route 108 in Cambridge, Vermont. Built in the 19th century, it is one of a small number of surviving Burr arch truss bridges in the state, and is one of three left in Cambridge. It was listed on the National Register of Historic Places in 1974.

== Description and history ==
The Grist Mill Covered Bridge is located south of the village of Jeffersonville, on Canyon Road a short way east of its junction with Vermont 108. The bridge is oriented east-west across the Brewster River, and rests on abutments of stone and concrete. It is a single-span Burr arch truss design, with a length of 84.5 feet (25.8 m), a total width of 17.5 feet (5.3 m), and a roadway width of 14 feet (4.3 m) (one lane). It is covered by a metal gabled roof, which projects beyond the truss ends. The trusses consists of vertical posts with diagonal bracing, flanked on each side by a rounded arch made of single timbers bolted together. The exterior is clad in vertical board siding, which extends around to the insides of the portals. Each of the long side walls has two rectangular window cutouts. The deck is made of wooden planking.

The bridge is one of three in the town of Cambridge, and is one of nine documented surviving Burr arch bridges in the state. Originally near a grist mill, its use declined in the 20th century, and by the time of its listing on the National Register in 1974, it was in somewhat deteriorated condition. In 2001, an engineering study determined that rehabilitation of the bridge was necessary to improve the load rating. In May 2004, Blow & Cote Contractors began rehabilitation, and the bridge was re-opened to traffic on October 13, 2004.

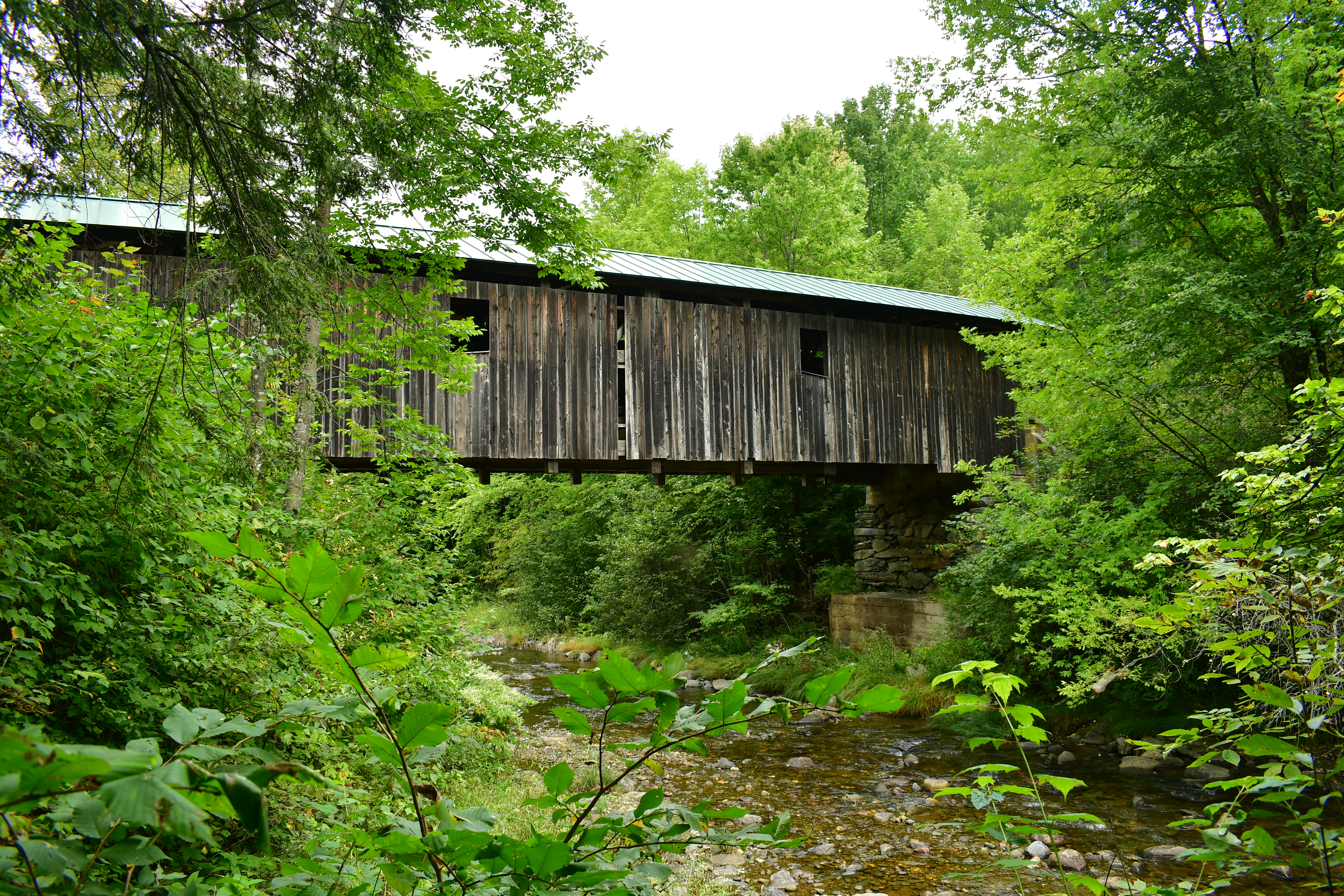

== See also ==
- National Register of Historic Places listings in Lamoille County, Vermont
- List of Vermont covered bridges
- List of bridges on the National Register of Historic Places in Vermont
