= Waterman Covered Bridge =

- U.S. National Register of Historic Places
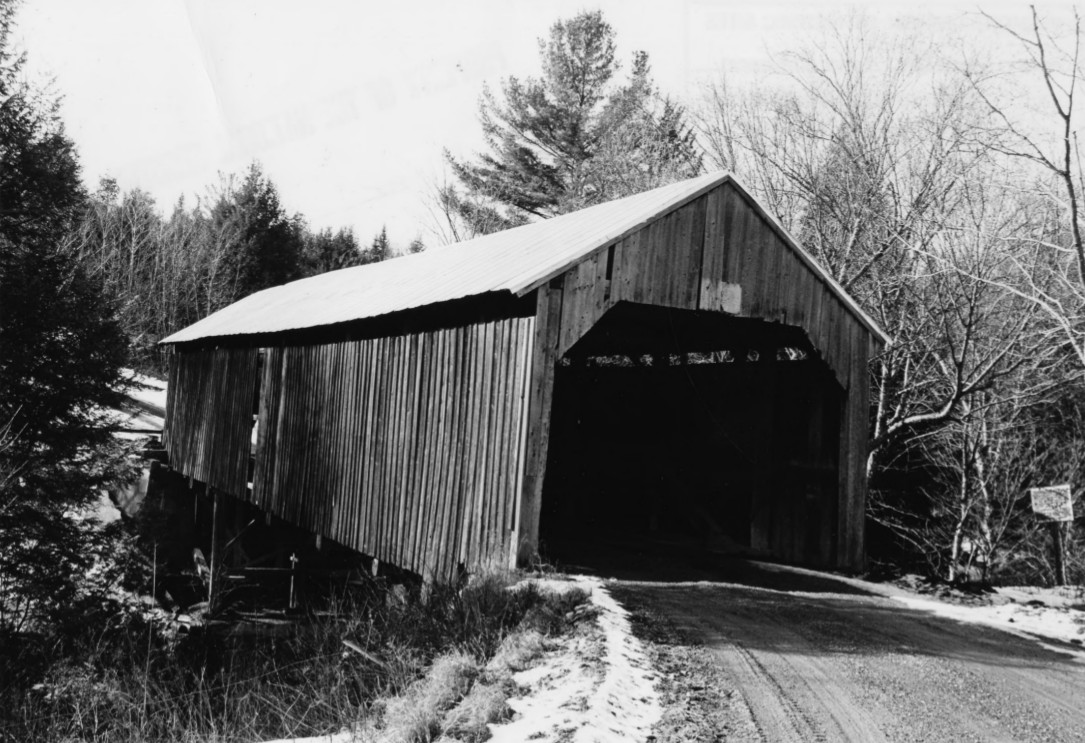
- 1974 photo

- Location within Vermont Location within the United States
- Location: Waterman Rd. over Waterman Creek, Johnson, Vermont
- Coordinates: 44°36′33″N 72°41′4″W
- Area: 1 acre (0.40 ha)
- Built: 1868
- Built by: Mills, George S.
- Architectural style: Queenpost trusses
- NRHP reference No.: 74000235
- Added to NRHP: June 13, 1974

The Waterman Covered Bridge was an historic covered bridge in Johnson, Vermont that carried Waterman Road across Waterman Creek. Built in 1868, it was one of three surviving 19th-century bridges in the town. It was listed on the National Register of Historic Places in 1974, and collapsed in January 1982.

== Description and history ==
The Waterman Covered Bridge was located in rural southern Johnson, carrying Waterman Road, a secondary road, across Waterman Creek. It was a two-span structure, with a main span that was a queen post truss, and a secondary span of post-and-beam construction. It rested on abutments of stone and concrete, with a timber bent supporting the inner ends of the two spans. The main span was 74 feet (23 m) long, and the secondary span 16 feet (4.9 m), giving the structure a total length of 90 feet (27 m). It was 19 feet (5.8 m) wide, with a roadway width of 16 feet (4.9 m), carrying one lane of traffic. The exterior was clad in vertical board siding, which extended around to the insides of the portals. On the sides, the siding ends short of the roof, leaving an open strip. The deck consisted of wooden planking laid over steel I-beams.

The bridge was built in 1868 by a George S. Mills, and was one of three surviving 19th-century covered bridges in the town. One of its abutments was rebuilt in concrete in 1962, and the deck reinforced with steel beams in 1969. When it was listed on the National Register in 1974, it was described as being in deteriorating condition; it collapsed in 1982.

== See also ==
- List of covered bridges in Vermont
- National Register of Historic Places listings in Lamoille County, Vermont
- List of bridges on the National Register of Historic Places in Vermont
