= Gold Brook Covered Bridge =

- U.S. National Register of Historic Places
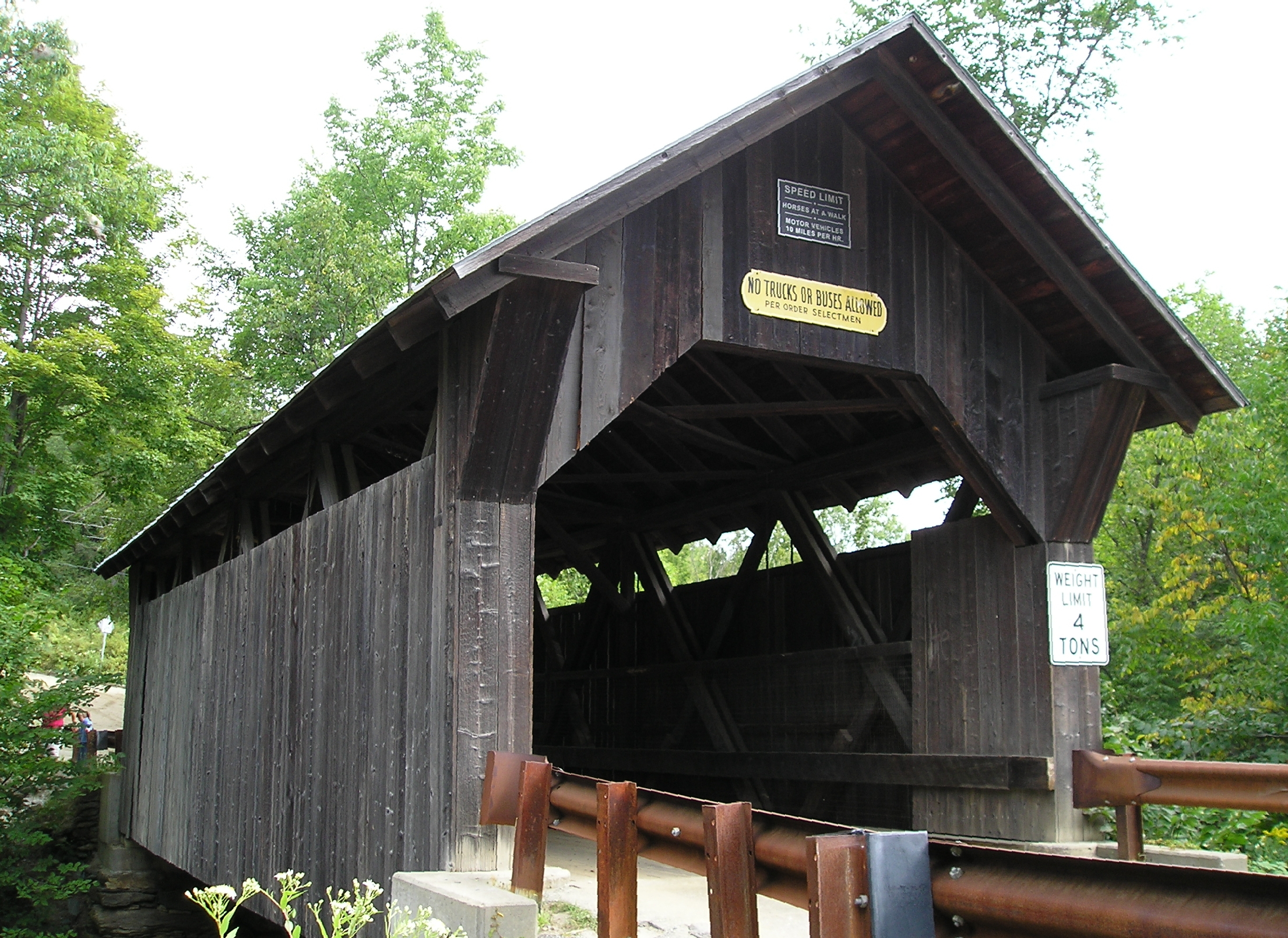

- Location within Vermont Location within the United States
- Location: Covered Bridge Rd., Stowe, Vermont
- Coordinates: 44°26′25.04″N 72°40′49.32″W
- Built: 1844
- Architect: Smith, John W.
- NRHP reference No.: 74000224
- Added to NRHP: October 1, 1974

Gold Brook Covered Bridge, also known as Stowe Hollow Bridge or Emily's Bridge, is a small wooden covered bridge in the town of Stowe, Lamoille County, Vermont, carrying Covered Bridge Road over Gold Brook. Built in 1844, it is the only 19th-century covered bridge in the state built using wooden Howe trusses and carrying a public roadway. It was added to the National Register of Historic Places in 1974.

Visitors have reported unexplained sounds, lights, and apparitions around the bridge, contributing to its reputation as a reportedly haunted location.

== Description and history ==
The Gold Brook Covered Bridge is located in the Stowe Hollow area of southeastern Stowe, carrying Covered Bridge Road across Gold Brook just north of a junction with Gold Brook Road and Stowe Hollow Road. The bridge is a single-span Howe truss, 48.5 feet (14.8 m) long and 17 feet (5.2 m) wide, with a roadway width of 13.5 feet (4.1 m). It is covered by a gabled metal roof and rests on dry-laid stone abutments. The exterior is sheathed in vertical board siding, which extends most of the way to the eaves, leaving a narrow strip open at the top. The siding extends around the portals and a short way to their insides. The bridge decking is wooden planking.

The bridge was built about 1844 by John W. Smith, and is the state's only surviving example of a Howe truss in timber on a public roadway. It is also a comparatively early example of the truss type in general; the Howe truss was patented in 1840. It is furthermore the only surviving 19th-century covered bridge in the town of Stowe.

In 1969, residents of Stowe adopted a resolution directing the town selectmen to provide perpetual maintenance of the bridge. It is the only covered bridge remaining in Stowe.

== Legend of Emily ==
Local folklore associate the bridge with a ghost named Emily, although the details of the story vary between accounts.The story appears to have originated in the late 1960s or early 1970s. Although versions of the legend describe Emily dying at the bridge after being abandoned by a lover, no evidence has been found that such a death occurred there. According to the legend, Emily was a young woman who was jilted by a lover and later died at the bridge, where her ghost is said to remain.

An early published account of the legend appeared in a local history of Lamoille County bridges by Bob Hagerman in the early 1970s. Hagerman drew on a high-school paper written by a local student, while an earlier history of Stowe had described the bridge without mentioning the ghost story. Several versions of Emily’s supposed death have circulated, including claims that she died accidentally or took her own life after the end of a romantic relationship. The student whose paper helped document the legend later said that she did not believe the bridge was haunted.

== In popular culture ==
- On September 2025, FD Paranormal teamed up with fellow investigators of the Vermont Paranormal Society to investigate Emily's Bridge.

== See also ==
- National Register of Historic Places listings in Lamoille County, Vermont
- List of Vermont covered bridges
- List of bridges on the National Register of Historic Places in Vermont
