= Stowe CCC Side Camp =

- U.S. National Register of Historic Places
- Location within Vermont Location within the United States
- Location: 6992 Mountain Rd., Stowe, Vermont
- Coordinates: 44°31′34″N 72°46′37″W
- Area: less than one acre
- Built: 1932
- Built by: CCC
- Architectural style: CCC
- NRHP reference No.: 02000027
- Added to NRHP: February 14, 2002

The Stowe CCC Side Camp, now known as the Vermont State Ski Dorm, is a historic residence hall at 6992 Mountain Road in Stowe, Vermont. Built in 1935 by crews of the Civilian Conservation Corps, it is one of the largest surviving CCC-built housing units to survive in the state. It was converted for use as a ski lodge after World War II. It was listed on the National Register of Historic Places in 2002.

== Description and history ==
The Stowe CCC Side Camp is located in Mount Mansfield State Forest, on the north side of Mountain Road (Vermont Route 108), about 0.5 miles (0.80 km) below the entrance to the Stowe Mountain Resort. It is accessed by a short gravel road that crosses the West Branch Little River, which separates the building from the main road. It is a two-story wood-frame structure, about 70 feet (21 m) long and 20 feet (6.1 m) deep, sited to give good views of Mount Mansfield. It is covered by a gable roof, pierced by one off-center interior chimney and another at the left end. Its facade is six bays wide, with the entrance in the center-right bay, sheltered by a gabled porch with rustic square posts. First floor windows are paired six-pane fixed windows, except the leftmost, which has sliding casements. Second floor windows are paired casement windows. The interior is rustic and simply appointed.

The camp was built in 1935 by a crew of the Civilian Conservation Corps, for its use as a residence while working on the roads and trails of the ski area and state forest. It originally housed 50 men, with another 25 housed in adjacent buildings that no longer stand. The building remained in use by the CCC until World War II ended in 1945, and was thereafter taken over by the state and operated as a ski lodge.

== See also ==
- National Register of Historic Places listings in Lamoille County, Vermont
