= Waterville, Vermont =

- Town
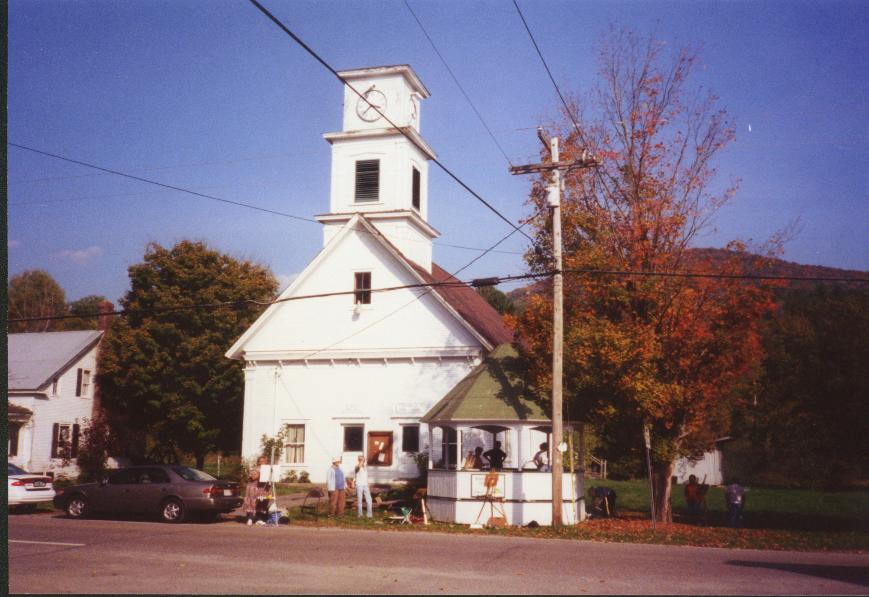
- Waterville town hall

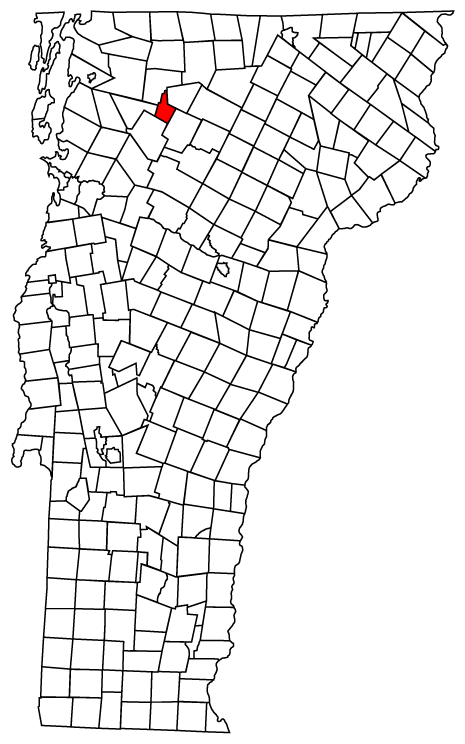
- Waterville, Vermont
- Coordinates: 44°44′15″N 72°44′56″W
- Country: United States
- State: Vermont
- County: Lamoille
- Incorporated: November 16, 1824

Area
  - Total: 16.41 sq mi (42.49 km^{2})
  - Land: 16.35 sq mi (42.34 km^{2})
  - Water: 0.054 sq mi (0.14 km^{2})
- Elevation: 748 ft (228 m)

Population (2020)
  - Total: 686
  - Density: 42/sq mi (16.2/km^{2})
- Time zone: UTC-5 (Eastern (EST))
  - Summer (DST): UTC-4 (EDT)
- ZIP code: 05492
- Area code: 802
- FIPS code: 50-77425
- GNIS feature ID: 1462246
- Website: www.watervillevt.org

Waterville is a town in Lamoille County, Vermont, United States. The population was 686 at the 2020 census.

== History ==
Before incorporation, Waterville was called "Coit's Gore" or "Cambridge Gore." It was incorporated on November 16, 1824.

== Geography ==
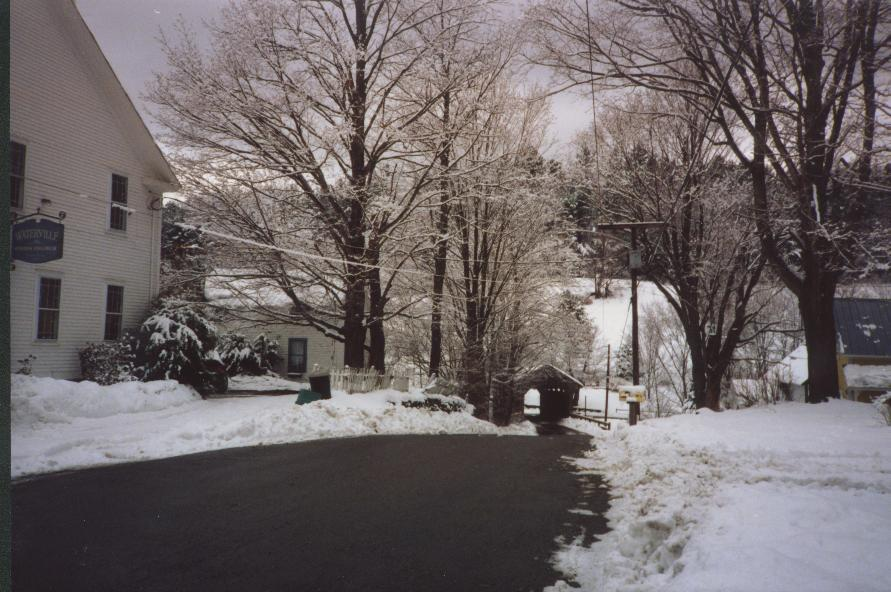
Church Street and the covered bridge in Waterville, in winter

Waterville is in northwestern Lamoille County, in the valley of the North Branch of the Lamoille River. The town is bordered to the west by Franklin County. Vermont Route 109 runs through the center of town, up the North Branch valley. It leads northeast (upstream) 10 miles (16 km) to Vermont Route 118 at Belvidere Corners and southwest 5 miles (8 km) to Jeffersonville in the town of Cambridge.

According to the United States Census Bureau, Waterville has an area of 16.4 square miles (42.5 km^{2}), of which 0.04 square miles (0.1 km^{2}), or 0.34%, are water.

== Demographics ==
Historical population
Census	Pop.	Note	%±
1790	15		—
1810	193		—
1820	273		41.5%
1830	488		78.8%
1840	610		25.0%
1850	753		23.4%
1860	747		−0.8%
1870	573		−23.3%
1880	547		−4.5%
1890	577		5.5%
1900	529		−8.3%
1910	485		−8.3%
1920	469		−3.3%
1930	370		−21.1%
1940	386		4.3%
1950	409		6.0%
1960	332		−18.8%
1970	397		19.6%
1980	470		18.4%
1990	532		13.2%
2000	697		31.0%
2010	673		−3.4%
2020	686		1.9%
U.S. Decennial Census

As of the census of 2000, there were 697 people, 260 households, and 186 families residing in the town. The population density was 42.5 people per square mile (16.4/km^{2}). There were 284 housing units at an average density of 17.3 per square mile (6.7/km^{2}). The racial makeup of the town was 97.27% White, 0.43% Native American, 0.29% Asian, and 2.01% from two or more races.

There were 260 households, out of which 38.1% had children under the age of 18 living with them, 58.1% were married couples living together, 6.5% had a female householder with no husband present, and 28.1% were non-families. 18.1% of all households were made up of individuals, and 4.2% had someone living alone who was 65 years of age or older. The average household size was 2.62 and the average family size was 2.98.

In the town, the population was spread out, with 28.0% under the age of 18, 7.6% from 18 to 24, 30.1% from 25 to 44, 24.1% from 45 to 64, and 10.2% who were 65 years of age or older. The median age was 36 years. For every 100 females, there were 113.1 males. For every 100 females age 18 and over, there were 100.0 males.

The median income for a household in the town was $39,453, and the median income for a family was $42,857. Males had a median income of $34,250 versus $22,917 for females. The per capita income for the town was $18,081. About 6.8% of families and 10.7% of the population were below the poverty line, including 9.4% of those under age 18 and 11.8% of those age 65 or over.

== Culture ==
The 20th-century American oil painter Emile Gruppe painted Waterville on several canvases from a variety of points of view, almost always including the church, the North Branch of the Lamoille River, and the Church Street covered bridge. Gruppe maintained a seasonal studio and painting school in the nearby village of Jeffersonville.

== Notable people ==
- James M. Hotchkiss (1812–1877), member of the Vermont House of Representatives and Vermont Senate
- Luke P. Poland (1815–1887), U.S. senator and representative, justice of the Vermont Supreme Court
