= Vermont Route 109 =

State highway in Lamoille County, Vermont, US

Vermont Route 109
- Map of Lamoille County in northern Vermont with VT 109 highlighted in red

Route information
- Maintained by VTrans
- Length: 14.800 mi (23.818 km)

Major junctions
- South end: VT 108 in Cambridge
- North end: VT 118 in Belvidere

Location
- Country: United States
- State: Vermont
- Counties: Lamoille

Highway system
- State highways in Vermont
← VT 108	→ VT 110

Vermont Route 109 (VT 109) is a 14.800-mile-long (23.818 km) state highway in the U.S. state of Vermont. It begins at VT 108 in the town of Cambridge and ends at VT 118 in Belvidere.

== Route description ==
The routes starts at VT 108 going east for a short period, and then turning to the northeast. While going in this direction, the route goes through the town of Waterville. The road then turns to the east and finally ends at a roundabout intersection with VT 118.

== Major intersections ==
The entire route is in Lamoille County.

Location	mi	km	Destinations	Notes
Cambridge	0.000	0.000	VT 108 to VT 15 – Jeffersonville, Bakersfield, Enosburg Falls	Southern terminus
Belvidere	14.800	23.818	VT 118 – Eden, Montgomery Center, East Berkshire	Northern terminus
1.000 mi = 1.609 km; 1.000 km = 0.621 mi
