= Lamoille River =

River in Vermont, United States

Coordinates: 44.5614046°N 72.6024229°W

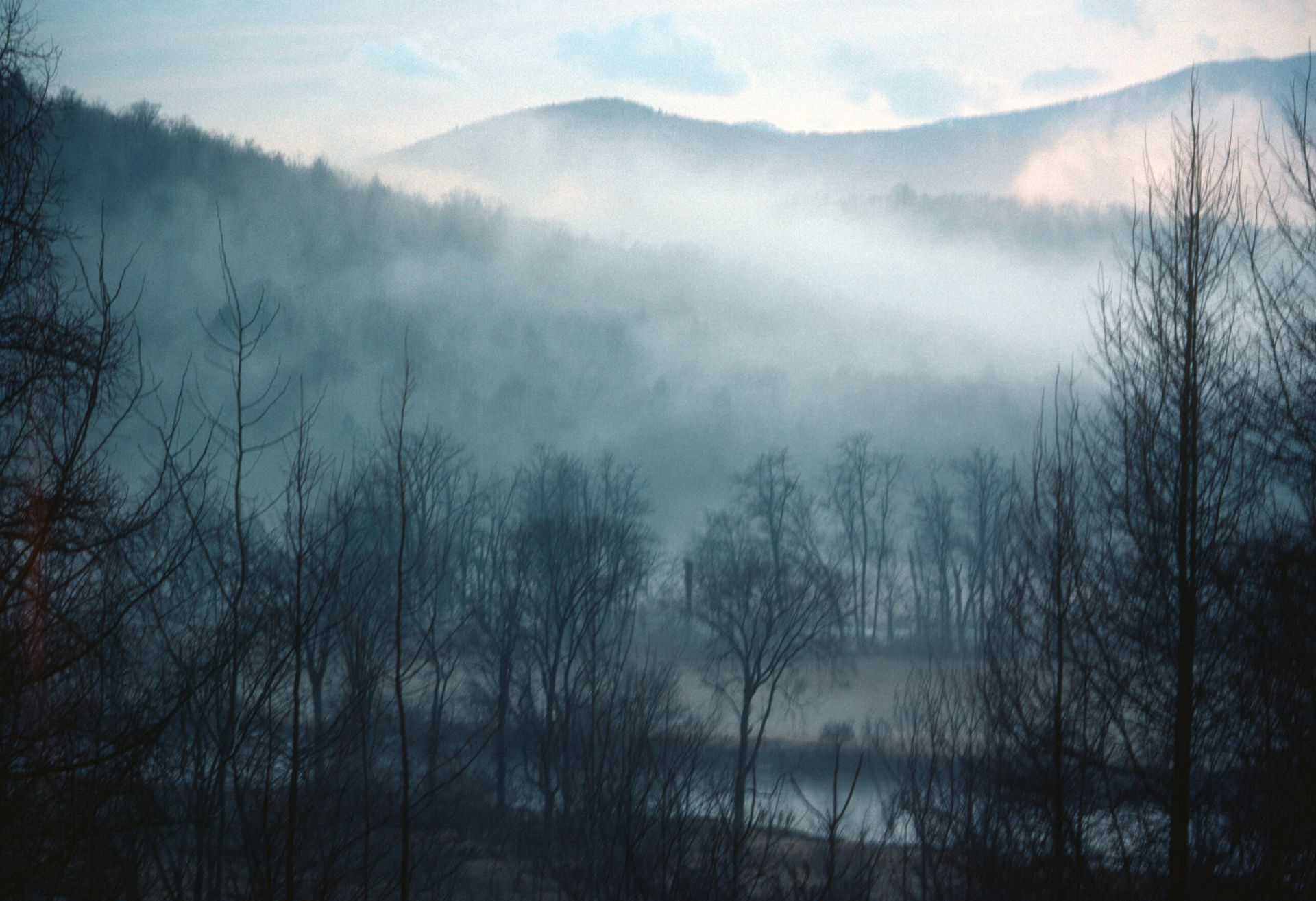
Fog in the Lamoille River valley in Hyde Park, Vermont

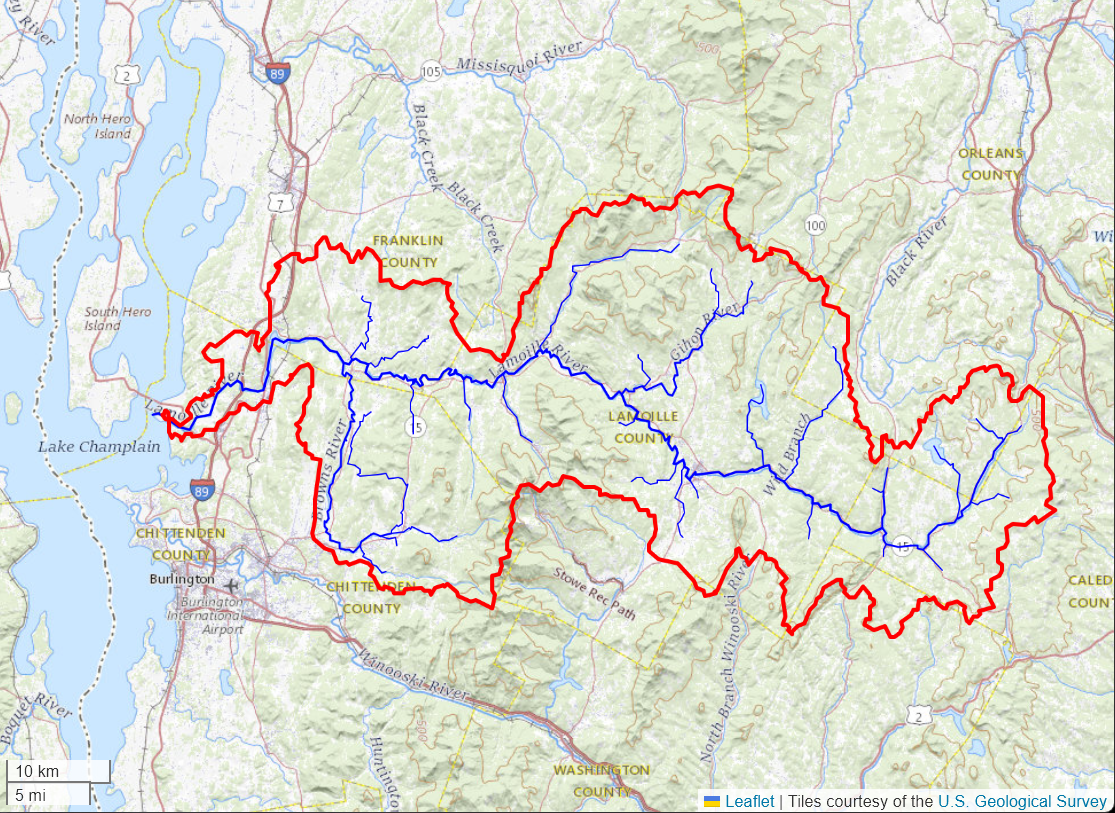
Watershed of the Lamoille River

The Lamoille River is a river which runs through northern Vermont and drains into Lake Champlain. It is about 85 miles (137 km) in length, and has a drainage area of around 706 square miles (1,830 km^{2}). The river generally flows southwest, and then northwest, from the water divide of the Green Mountains. It is the namesake of Lamoille County, Vermont, through which it flows. The river was the basis of the name of the now-defunct Lamoille Valley Railroad Company, successor to the St. Johnsbury and Lamoille County Railroad.

Legend has it that early French settlers named the river La Mouette, meaning "The Seagull". However, a cartographer forgot to cross the t's, which led people to begin calling it La Moulle. Over time, this became Lamoille, elided in speaking.

In July 2023, heavy rains caused flooding on the Lamoille River and on the nearby Winooski River and Missisquoi River.

== See also ==
- List of rivers of Vermont
