= Effects of the July 2023 Northeastern United States floods in Vermont =

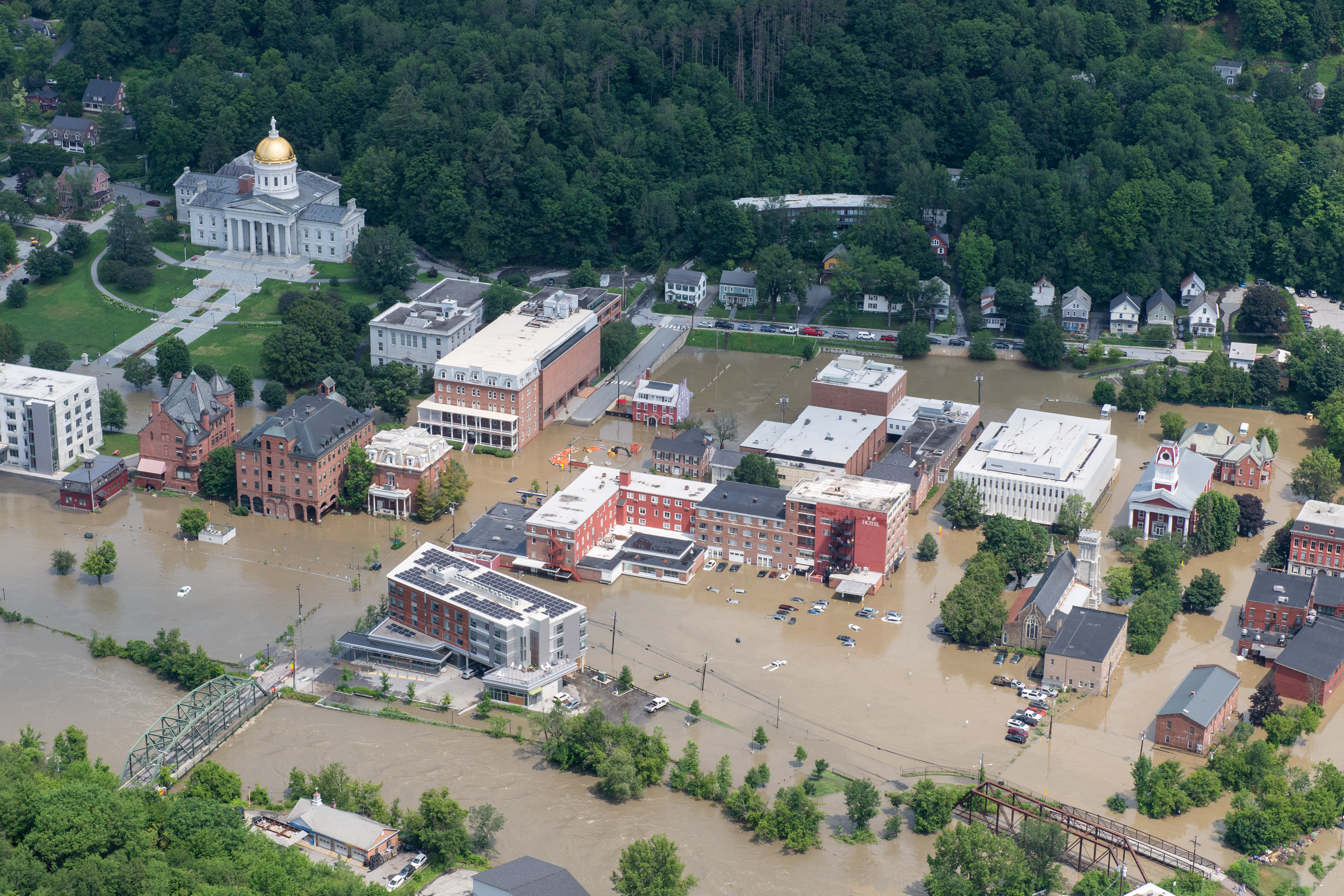
- An aerial view of flooding in Montpelier on July 11
- Cause: Heavy rains

Meteorological history
- Duration: July 9, 2023 – July 10, 2023

Flood
- Max. rainfall: 9.20 in (234 mm) in Calais

Overall effects
- Fatalities: 2
- Damage: >$600 million
- Areas affected: Vermont
- Power outages: Unknown
- Houses destroyed: >34
- Part of the July 2023 Northeastern United States floods

The July 2023 Northeastern United States floods caused historic, devastating floods across the U.S. state of Vermont, primarily on July 9 and 10. In preparation for the floods, the Weather Prediction Center had issued its first-ever high risk for excessive rainfall for areas in the National Weather Service in Burlington, Vermont's coverage zone, while state governor Phil Scott declared a state of emergency. The flooding and damage stemming from it was described by Scott as "historic and catastrophic", as much of the state received more than 4 inches (100 mm) of rainfall. Additionally, already-saturated ground across Vermont and other meteorological factors, including sufficient moisture and high dewpoints and precipitable water values, contributed to the severity of the floods.

The most impacted areas of the state as a result of the flooding included the capital city of Montpelier, the city of Barre, and the towns of Londonderry, Ludlow, and Weston. The highest rainfall total was recorded in Calais, Washington County; 9.20 inches (234 mm) of rain fell there. The floods also caused two fatalities and widespread damage to infrastructure and communities across the state, including in and around of the Appalachian Mountains. While conducting recovery operations in response to the event, state officials stated that the flooding and its damages was "bigger than Hurricane Irene", a Category 3 hurricane which also caused damaging floods across Vermont and the Northeastern United States in 2011. The floods were also compared to other historic flood events that occurred in the state's past, including Irene and the Great Vermont Flood of 1927.

== Background ==
Vermont had been subject to other notable weather events and phenomena in 2023, including a stretch of above-average temperatures and drought conditions that was present across the Northeastern United States for most of the year and smoke emitted from wildfires in Canada. The state also had previously suffered catastrophic flooding events in the last century, including in 2011 stemming from a weakening Hurricane Irene and the Great Vermont Flood of 1927. Flooding events have been destructive due in part of the mountainous, rugged terrain that encompasses much of the state, including the Appalachian Mountains. The government of Vermont implemented a state hazard mitigation plan in 2018, which failed nearly six years later as a result of disaster declarations from natural disasters including the 2023 flood where the plan's tasks had not been implanted during recovery efforts. After the floods in 2011, the state's government started a reconstruction effort costing $130 million to rebuild homes and structures damaged by the disaster event. This involved the purchase of nearly 150 homes during reconstruction efforts; these were built in areas where rivers nearby had the potential to overflow and inundate them, however. A 728-page state document published in 2015 also noted the damages sustained from Irene and outlined projects necessary for communities to be protected from future floods; this was not successfully complete due to financial reasons, however. Despite flooding being the primary natural disaster in the state, much of Vermont had not been included in the Federal Emergency Management Agency (FEMA)'s flood-tracking system for potential development of structures that were not subject to the threat of future floods. The chances of two significant flood events impacting the state in a short period of time were at, according to The Washington Post, .6%. The floods also occurred amid a global warming crisis and an El Niño event; these were some of the contributing factors to the flood event itself. A study conducted by Dartmouth College showed that, with the rate of climate change occurring, extreme weather events across the Northeast was to increase 52% by 2100.

== Meteorological synopsis ==
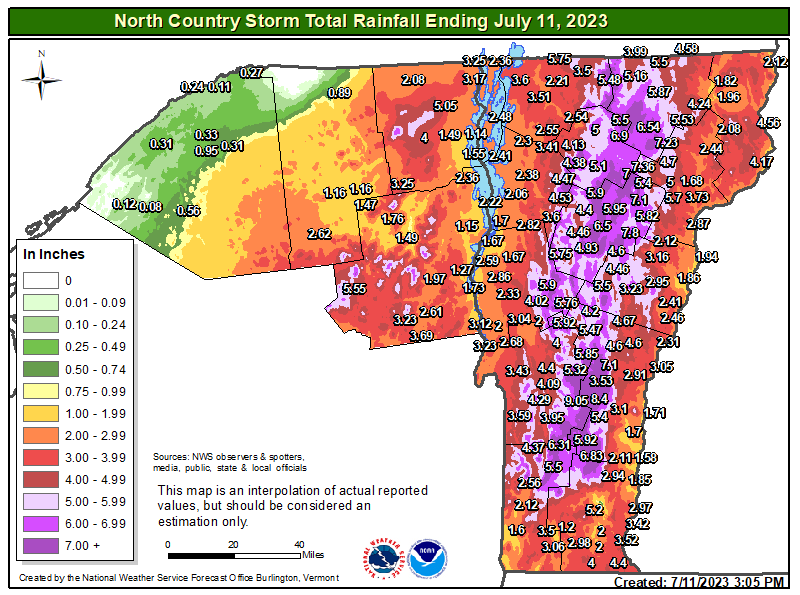
A map of rainfall totals across NWS Burlington, Vermont's area of responsibility, including Vermont and northeastern New York

On July 9, sufficient moisture was noted across much of the Northeastern United States as high dewpoints and precipitable water values (PWATs) ranged around 1.6–1.8 inches (41–46 mm), which resulted in heavier rainfall amounts and rates as convection moved in from the southwest. This atmospheric setup was primarily caused by a jet stream located directly over New England that pulled in moisture from the south, which was wedged in between a low-pressure area over Canada near the Upper Peninsula of Michigan and a high-pressure area located in the northern Atlantic Ocean, the latter of which was a large, expanded area off the coast of Nova Scotia towards Greenland. The moisture was also likely contributed from the warm waters of the Atlantic Ocean as well, evaporating and producing heavy rainfall across the Northeast. Additionally, a trough had progressed from the Great Lakes and the Ohio River regions to portions of Vermont and New York, where it slowed down in movement after reaching the latter areas; this caused extended, prolonged heavy rainfall to northeastern New York and Vermont.

An area of convergence also influenced additional development of showers and thunderstorms across much of the state. Some areas impacted were already saturated by previous rainfall that occurred two days prior, where localized areas had already received 2–4 inches (51–102 mm) with isolated higher amounts. The aforementioned atmospheric trend continued into July 10, which extended the period of heavy rainfall across the same areas that were impacted the day before. The floods was described by atmospheric and environmental research scientists as "extremely unusual" and linked to effects stemming from climate change. There were also instances of wind damage as the convection also downed several trees and branches amid a level 1/marginal risk being issued for severe weather by the Storm Prediction Center for much of New England. Most parts of the state received 3–9 inches (76–229 mm) of rainfall, with 4–8 inches (100–200 mm) occurring across the Green Mountains and nearby areas with localized higher amounts.

Additional heavy rains on July 16 resulted in the exacerbation of the already-saturated ground across much of the state, but was less significant than the event on July 9–10.

== Preparations and impact ==
On July 9, the Weather Prediction Center issued their first-ever high risk for flash flooding in the NWS Burlington coverage zone. Because of this, a state of emergency was declared by state governor Phil Scott, which allowed the use of out-of-state resources for emergency responders in the state.

Governor Scott described the widespread flooding in the state "historic and catastrophic" and "Irene 4.0", while state officials stated that the damages stemming from the floods and the flooding itself were more significant than Hurricane Irene, a Category 3 hurricane which caused widespread flooding impacts to the state in 2011. Scott's home itself was impacted by the floods as nearby roads near there were completely impassable as a result, which forced him to hike through snowmobile trails. The flooding prompted thirteen emergency management teams to rescue more than 100 people across Vermont. Initially, 4,087 homes and 839 businesses were reportedly damaged, with 754 of the damaged homes being uninhabitable and 314 people displaced as a result of the floods; however, more than 3,160 homes were eligible for damage repair assistance by the Federal Emergency Management Agency (FEMA) and the number of damaged businesses across the state was below 800 in a WCAX-TV total. According to applications submitted to FEMA, more than 2,900 homes were recorded to have been damaged, including 530 significantly and 14 destroyed. Peter Banacos, a meteorologist associated with the National Weather Service in Burlington, Vermont, compared the floods with the effects of Hurricane Irene in 2011 and noted that damage from the floods "exceeded" the latter event, with the Great Vermont Flood of 1927 only causing further damage than the two events. The United States Geological Survey also reported that some river levels caused by the heavy rainfall crested at record levels, breaking those set by Irene. During the event and its recovery process, all statewide swift boat rescue teams were activated. The damage caused by the severe weather and floods totaled in excess of $600 million (2023 USD).

=== Washington County ===
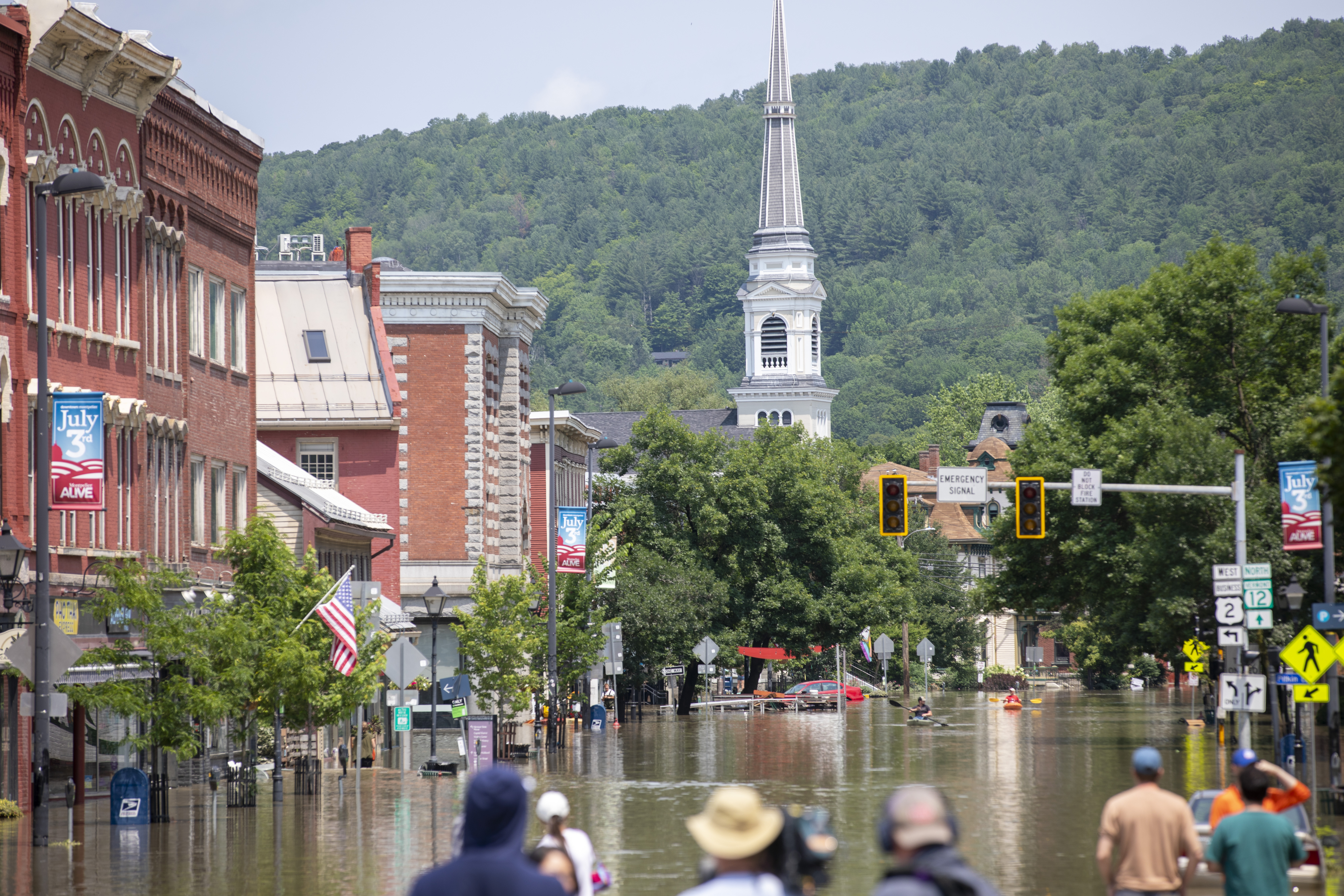
Street flooding in downtown Montpelier on July 11

The county seat, Montpelier, was severely impacted by the floods. A travel ban was initiated after floodwaters inundated roads across the downtown area; the floodwaters itself also prompted a boil water notice issued for the entire city amid warnings that the city's drinking water system could potentially be contaminated as a result. Several of the city's government buildings, including Montpelier City Hall, were flooded and some were forced to relocate. Additionally, numerous businesses and homes were destroyed after flooding left them uninhabitable and unable to operate; this included a United States Postal Service building in the city's downtown area which did not open until 15 months later. Residents in the city were also forced to evacuate low-lying areas and locations near the Winooski River, after it crested to record flood levels not observed since Hurricane Irene; this included portions of downtown Montpelier. This also led to rising water levels at the Wrightsville Dam, which threatened to burst or overflow on July 11; it then receded by the evening hours of the day. At the Edward F. Knapp State Airport near Montpelier, 5.28 inches (134 mm) of rain fell, setting a record for the heaviest rainfall in a single day in the city and breaking the previous record of 5.27 inches (134 mm) set in 2011 by Hurricane Irene's remnants. Overall, nearly 140 businesses across the city were damaged, which resulted in damages in excess of $20 million; almost a dozen homes also sustained "severe" damage.

Nearby, the city of Barre also experienced similar impacts; there and Ludlow, a town in Essex County, were considered to be the most affected in terms of flash flooding. Rainfall totals in excess of 7 inches (180 mm) there caused the Winooski River to overflow its banks and produced widespread flooding across the city, including the downtown area, where officials closed off until the floods receded. The combination of debris and several feet-deep mud caused by the floods induced odors across northern and downtown portions of the city. Additionally, several roads there, including Vermont Route 62, were flooded, damaged, or washed out completely; this forced officials to close them off. A 63-year-old man drowned in the flood-inundated basement of his home in Barre. The Thunder Road International SpeedBowl was scheduled to host the second event of the 2023 Superstar Racing Experience auto racing season on July 20, but the event was cancelled as result of the floods in the city. There were nearly 350 structures or properties damaged significantly; an additional 600 claims of damage were reported in Barre. The city also had 10 percent of its homes either destroyed or left uninhabitable.

Several other towns and communities in the county also sustained considerable or severe damage. In Berlin, heavy rainfall caused four mobile home parks to flood completely, including a 32-unit one. At least 61 manufactured homes were uninhabitable as a result, including 34 of which were destroyed. Seventeen roads across the city were damaged, including one of which had a major culvert washed out. The Stevens Branch, a tributary of the Winooski River, overflowed; this flooded a shopping plaza, including a Big Lots and several nearby businesses. The town of Middlesex in close proximity sustained severe damage as well, with damages totaling at $4.7 million. Plainfield also saw similar effects. Additionally, both directions of Interstate 89 was closed in the county, northbound between Berlin and Middlesex and southbound near Montpelier, after debris was strewn across the roadway by the floodwaters. Flooding also closed numerous roads countywide, including Vermont Routes 14 and 16. The highest rainfall total in the county and across the state was in Calais, where 9.20 in (234 mm) fell. Across the county, flood-related damages were estimated in excess of $113 million.

=== Windsor County ===
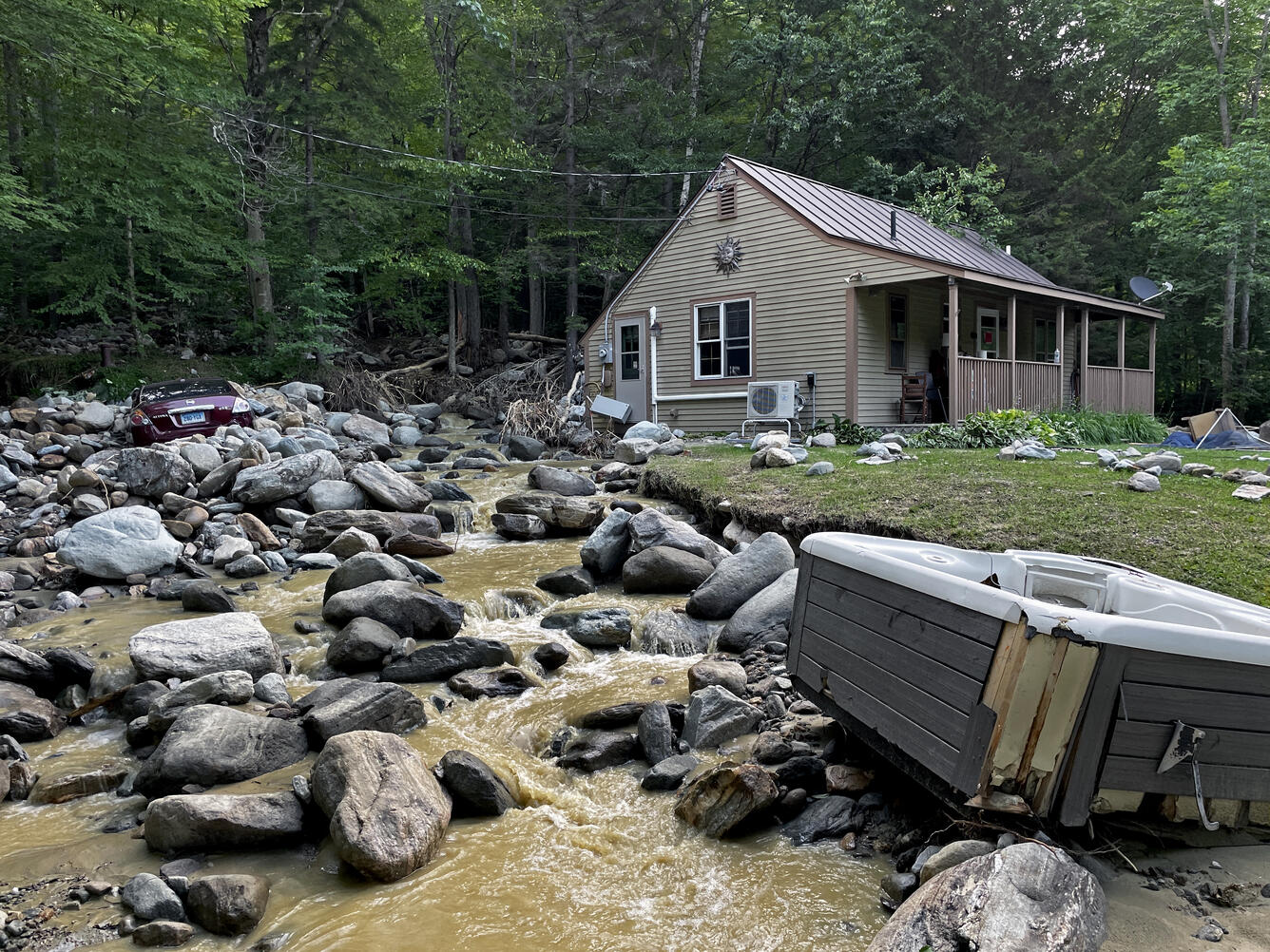
A flood-damaged residence along Vermont Route 100 in Plymouth

Weston was significantly impacted by the floods, especially as a result of the crested West River nearby. Consequently, multiple evacuations were ordered for residential areas along the river. Several businesses were significantly damaged by flooding, including a historic 300-seat playhouse theater, which had its basement at a total loss after it was completely flooded. Many other structures were damaged or flooded, including the town's fire station, which was inundated with 5 feet (150 cm) of floodwaters; roads were also damaged or washed out, including a portion of Vermont Route 100 being flooded because of the West River overflow; the crested river itself also destroyed a bridge that was located over the river.

The town of Ludlow was also affected by heavy rainfall and flooding, with damage described there as "catastrophic". The Black River, a tributary of the Connecticut River, crested; this inundated multiple vehicles in floodwaters and damaged several businesses and shopping stores. A steakhouse and marketplace were among the several businesses damaged; they were inundated with 7 feet (210 cm) and 4 feet (120 cm) of floodwaters, respectively. Among the several roads closed in the town were Vermont Routes 100 and 103 after they were flooded; some local streets were covered with 3 feet (91 cm) of water as well. A portion of the Green Mountain Railroad was washed out in the town, which resulted in only the railroad tracks being suspended above the surface. A 100 yards (91 m) portion of railroad tracks also fell into floodwaters, which in turn caused damage to several homes. Some sewage from the town's main treatment plant were washed into a nearby river while also damaging nearby structures and roads. Additionally, a sewage pipe was significantly damaged and had begun to spill sewage into the Black River before a bypassing sewage line was implemented to stop the discharge.

In Chester, some flood damage occurred, but was noted as less than Hurricane Irene in 2011 after protection measures were implemented as a result of the latter event. However, damage included several roads being flooded and closed as a result; among them was a route connecting the town and Ludlow, which cut off direct access between the two communities. The combination of heavy rainfall and the overflow of a Williams River branch caused flooding across southern parts of the downtown area and nearby residential areas. A dam in the town overflowed, which prompted fears of it collapsing and sending the spilled water towards the Williams River. The town's fire department made at least 35 water rescues there.

Several other towns nearby sustained significant damage. Flooding damaged several homes and businesses in Cabot, including a village store that sustained $100,000 in damages. The main route through Marshfield, U.S. Route 2, was closed in two areas; the town itself was without drinking water for at least nine days after its supply system was washed out by a landslide. A town bridge connecting either Marshfield or Plainfield and a campground was washed out by the Winooski River, isolating it and deserting people there. (Note: Sources conflict on the location where the bridge connects to from the campground; the magazine Seven Days states that the bridge connected to Marshfield, while WCAX-TV lists the bridge reached to Plainfield. However, no other source picks up on the specific location of the bridge besides these two; therefore, the two towns are mentioned as to which town the bridge from the campground connects to.) A farmers' market in Woodstock suspended operations after it was inundated by floodwaters; it did not reopen until September 8. The town also lost its drinking water supply for 10 days, which forced daycare centers, hotels, and restaurants there to close.

Nearly a dozen campers in Andover were rescued by swift boat after the bridge entering and exiting out of Andover was washed out. High water levels along the Ompompanoosuc and White rivers prompted evacuations for areas and residents in the towns of Thetford and Hartford, respectively. The White River also washed out a bridge that was to be fully constructed as a connecting route between Vermont Route 14 and a separate road in the village of Hartford. Additionally, a branch of the river washed out portions of roads and flooded sports fields in Bethel; sixteen people were rescued from floodwaters in the town as well. A water gauge south of Bethel recorded 40,000 cubic feet (1,100 m^{3}) of water moving through the White River per second, which was half the amount of the water measured in the same area of the river during Hurricane Irene, where every second, 90,000 cubic feet (2,500 m^{3}) of water flowed through.

Nearby, the Ottauquechee River also overflowed, flooding parts of Bridgewater and damaging several businesses there; while in Cavendish, several roads were flooded or washed out, with some of them attributed to the overflowing Black River nearby. A branch of the Black River also overflowed in Reading, flooding several homes and destroying a Vermont Route 106 bridge. At Camp Plymouth State Park, twelve people were stranded after the campsite was completely flooded; damage there was also worse than any other state park and forced the state park to close for the rest of 2023. Twenty-one people at a residential care center in Chelsea were evacuated as the town itself also sustained flood damage. Numerous roads were flooded across the county as well, including U.S. Route 4 and Vermont Routes 106, 107, and 132. The highest rainfall total countywide was in Plymouth, where 9.05 inches (230 mm) fell; the town sustained significant flooding as a result and damages totaled $3.36 million. A 67-year-old man was killed after he was swept away by the floods while hiking the Appalachian Trail in Stockbridge.

=== Lamoille County ===
The significant flooding caused "devastating" damage in Johnson. The city's main wastewater treatment plant was heavily damaged, with it being characterized as "total destruction". Operations at the plant did not resume until one month after the floods. The town's main grocery store was also affected by the floods, with the damage forcing it to be permanently closed. The downtown area of Johnson was flooded, with several homes and businesses becoming inundated with floodwaters, including the town's main library branch. Vermont Route 15 through the town was flooded as well. Nearby, the Lamoille River near Johnson reached a crest level of 20.01 feet (6.10 m), and at a "major" flood stage as a result.

In Morristown, infrastructure damages totaled up to $3 million. This included two damaged hydroelectric dams and several drinking water wells located inside town limits. Nearby, Wolcott suffered extensive damage to structures because of the Lamoille River overflowing its banks, forcing numerous roads including Route 15 to shut down due to flooding and evacuations. The communities of Cambridge and Jeffersonville were also impacted by the floods, with 33 evacuations taking place in the latter location.

=== Windham County ===
The town of Londonderry suffered substantial damage as a result of the floods, especially southern portions of the area. Several businesses, including a diner, were affected, with damages totaling over $104,000. Nearly every single road in the town was shut down, including parts of state routes 11 and 100 in Londonderry and the nearby town of Weston. Additionally, at least thirty homes there were inundated with floodwaters. Within town limits, several people were rescued by public safety crews.

Heavy rainfall caused a landslide at Jamaica State Park, prompting officials to shut down a 1.5 miles (2.4 km) section of a 3.1 miles (5.0 km) trail impacted by it there. There were several structures and vehicles inundated by floodwaters in Jamaica itself. Nearby, Wilmington did not sustain as much damage, although water levels rose at record levels on the Deerfield River. Meanwhile, structures were "severely damaged" in Wardsboro. The heavy rains also prompted two dams to be released as a result of large, "unprecedented" water levels being held up against them.

=== Orleans County ===
Barton sustained significant damage from the heavy rainfall, especially areas near the Barton River. Numerous basements of homes were inundated with 4–5 feet (120–150 cm) of floodwaters. A wastewater treatment plant inside city limits remained at normal operating levels, although heavy rainfall damaged its flow meter. Six people were rescued in Barton from the flooding. U.S. Route 5 and Vermont Routes 16 and 58 were closed in both Barton and Orleans. There were at least ten homes that sustained "extensive" damage in Glover, and a sinkhole opened in a dam nearby. In the town of Greensboro, roads were washed out and several power outages occurred; a local lake also overflowed. Multiple businesses were shut down across several communities in the county, including in Barton, Albany, Craftsbury, and Newport. The fire department in Craftsbury was destroyed as well. In Newport Center, a road was reportedly washed out by the floodwaters.

=== Elsewhere ===
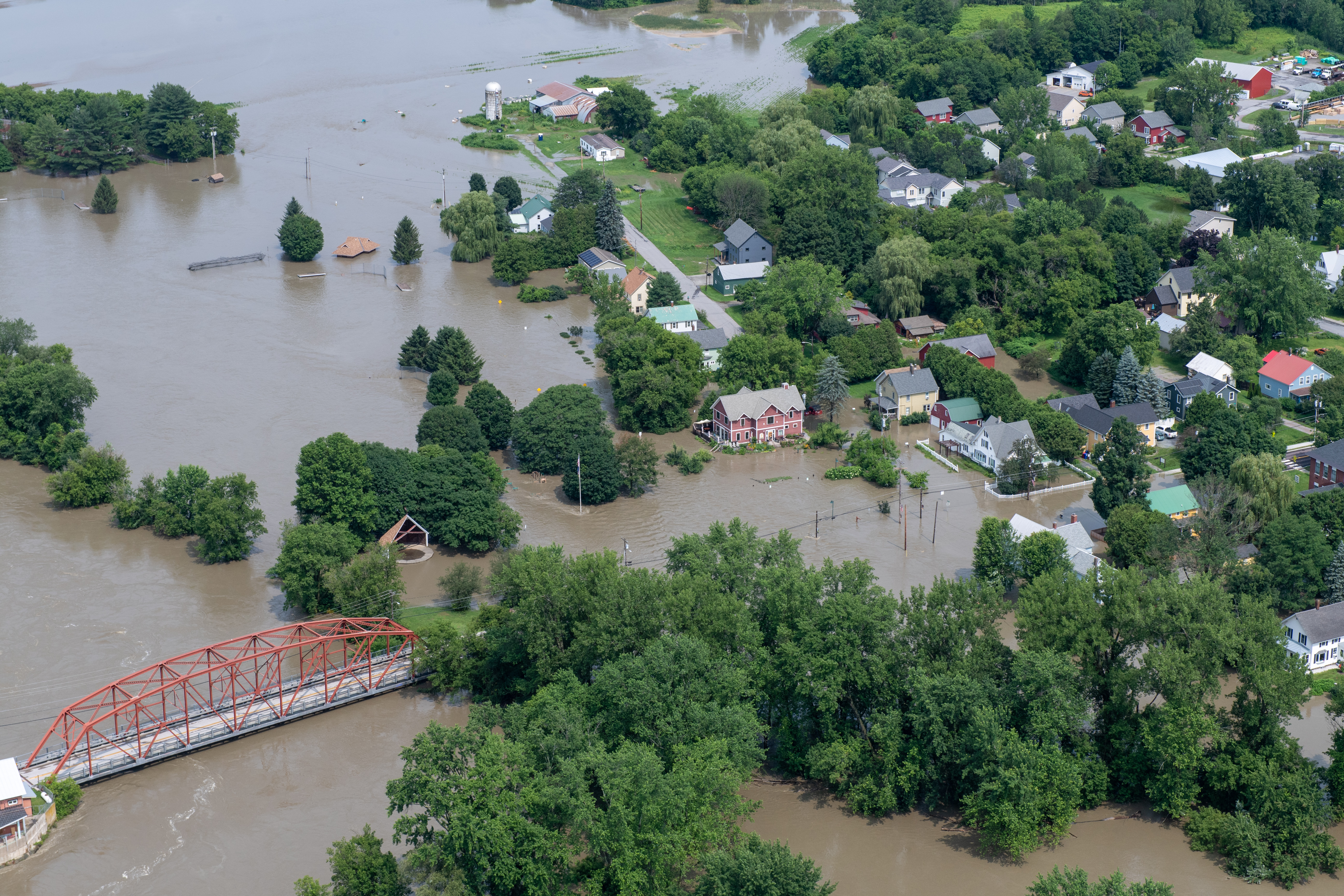
An above-ground view of flooding in Richmond on July 11

Across Rutland County, flooding inflicted severe damage across the county, including in Killington. Several lodges and trails associated with the Killington Ski Resort were significantly damaged, while U.S. Route 4 in the town and Vermont Route 103 in Proctorsville were closed near the town after mudslides caused extensive damage to portions of both roadways. There were several track washouts along the Vermont Railway between Rutland and Burlington in Chittenden County.

In neighboring Addison County, a mudslide triggered by the heavy rains caused significant damage to multiple homes and structures along Vermont Route 125 in Ripton. Meanwhile, although most of Caledonia County experienced widespread heavy rainfall, most of the significant impacts were confined to extreme western portions of it, especially in and around Hardwick.

In Chittenden County, a road was closed in Essex due to flooding. In Franklin County, Fairfax sustained "major" flooding, especially across Route 104; several structures were also inundated. The Lamoille and Missisquoi rivers both exceeded normal water levels, resulting in flooding across several communities including Berkshire, Enosburgh, St. Albans, and Swanton. One home in Highgate was evacuated due to flooding.

== Aftermath ==
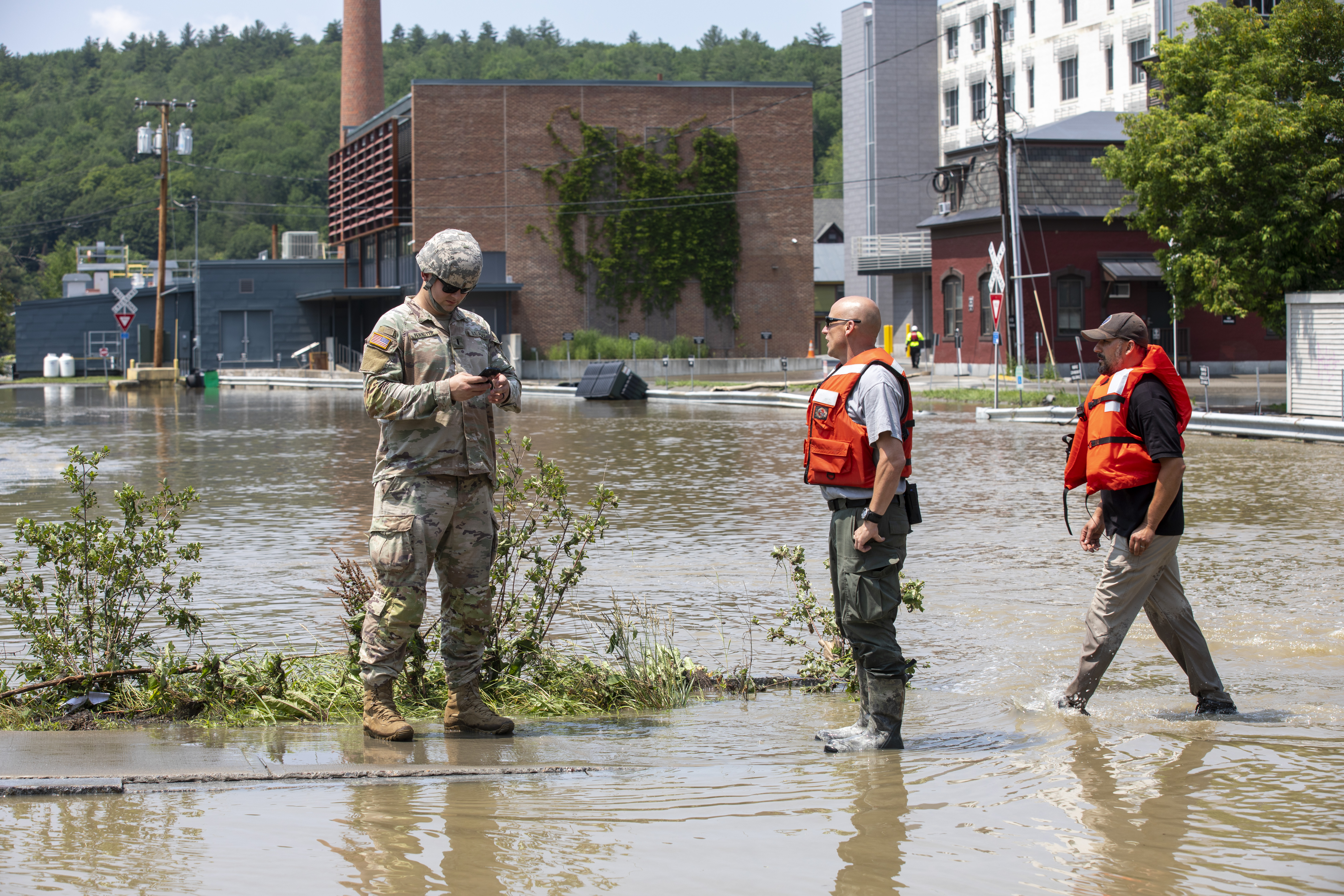
Recovery efforts initiated by the Vermont National Guard in response to the flooding

In response to the floods, state governor Phil Scott signed a disaster declaration into effect, which was approved by United States president Joe Biden nearly three months later in October 2023. He also ordered plans to redesign a neighborhood on the north side of Barre after it was significantly flooded, fearing the potential for further damages due to the possibility for future flood-related events. Scott also made a proposal to repair a mobile home park damaged by the floods as well. The commissioner of public safety in Vermont, Jennifer Morrison, stated in regards to the recovery efforts: "this is going to be a years – if not a decade – long recovery for the state of Vermont".

The Barre Auditorium was set up as an emergency shelter for flood-impacted victims in the city by the American Red Cross. The Vermont National Guard, a unit of the Army National Guard, had distributed resources and supplies as well, including 70,000 litres (18,000 US gal) of water. The Federal Emergency Management Agency (FEMA) and the Small Business Administration donated millions of dollars to people and businesses that were impacted by the floods, including $50 million for public assistance alone as of July 2024. The United States Department of Agriculture helped contribute to a new public safety building in Cabot after the emergency services and fire department buildings were demolished due to the floods. FEMA and the Smithsonian Institution offered methods taught by sustention experts for preserving objects and items from flooding and being damaged by such events. A flood recovery aid effort was also started by the state government after some monetary donations given by FEMA were ultimately not enough to pay off repairs or damages overall. The government agency itself faced some backlash for being inconsistent in its efforts following the floods.

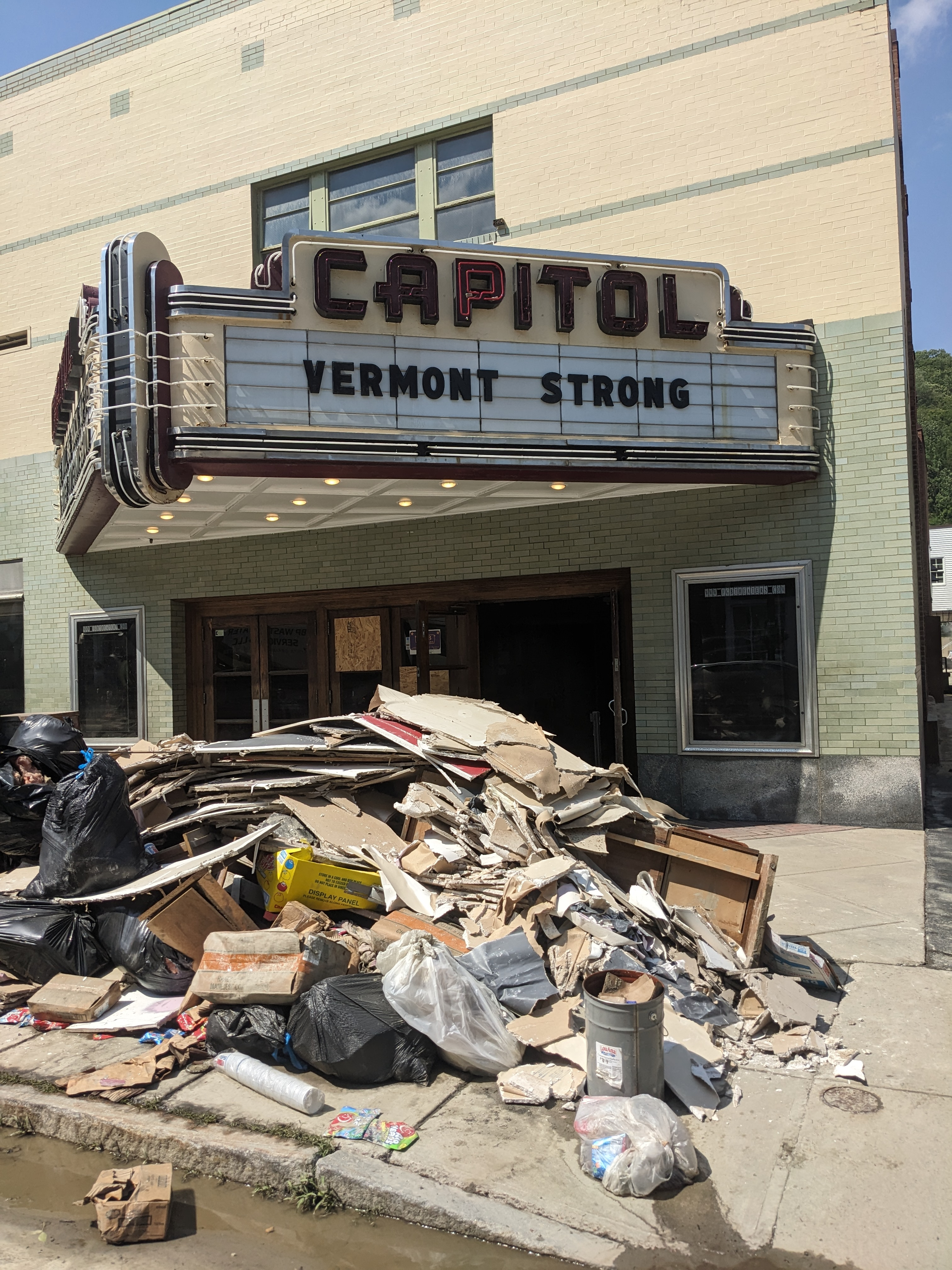
A pile of debris from the floods outside of a theater in Montpelier on July 13

In Stratton, Windham County, a relief foundation was started by residents there to assist in recovery efforts following the floods, raising over $425,000 as of August 2023. Similarly, the towns of Rockingham and Springfield in neighboring Windsor County started flood recovery efforts to towns in the county that were severely impacted by the floods, with the latter town's government sending public works crews to towns including Cavendish, Chester, and Ludlow. Across Vermont, recovery groups were created to assist homeowners displaced from their residences in the weeks after the floods, which also took place situations where governments could not help, including FEMA. Mental health workers and organizations also helped in recovery efforts for people affected by the flooding by assisting those who specifically suffered from trauma as the program for this was paid by the federal government itself. An internship program headed by the University of Vermont helped businesses recovery financially from the floods as well; a legal clinic was also established in Ludlow to assist business owners financially and physically.

Numerous local merchandise and retail stores and businesses struggled economically around the state after the flooding, especially with the decreased amount of customers visiting them. The locations specifically impacted by this included the state capital, Montpelier, where some businesses suffered a 50 percent drop in revenue compared to its total a few years prior. Some businesses also were involved in buyout struggles after they were destroyed by the floods. Despite this, some properties were already bought out prior to the flood in response to impacts caused by Hurricane Irene in 2011, lessening the damage total. Campgrounds across the state also sustained similar effects with the popularity of state park activities, including fishing and hiking, decreasing by 20 percent and some parks not reopening for months after the floods, including Camp Plymouth State Park. Some residences were not habitable for weeks as a result of damaged roads that were accessible to them; additionally, several water systems across the state were damaged, rendering some communities including Royalton and Woodstock without any running water.

In Plainfield, a dam came under scrutiny after officials conflicted the safety of it and its effectiveness – including fears that it would collapse after holding back an excessive amount of water during the 2023 floods. Meanwhile, several local governments did not have the sufficient budget to repair infrastructure and roads of towns, with some citing FEMA as the reason for "not having clarity". Additionally, concerns rose over governor Scott's handling of flood-related aid after he took out approximately $20 million out of a broadband funding program and used it for recovery efforts connected to the 2023 floods.

In May 2024, governor Scott and the state government enacted a law, named the "Climate Superfund Act", that required oil and fossil fuel companies to pay for climate-related damages, including some sustained from the July 2023 event.

Although more heavy rains fell exactly one year after the 2023 floods in Montpelier, damages were mostly minimal because of the preparations and extensive repairs that were completed, although substantial damage still occurred in areas north and east of the city.
