= Winooski project =

The Winooski project consisted of erecting three dams on the Winooski River in Vermont. It is said to have been one of the largest Civilian Conservation Corps construction projects in America.

In November 1927, the worst flooding in Vermont history killed 120 people; 55 of the deaths occurred in the watershed of the Winooski River, convincing the state of the need for flood control projects in that watershed. State officials made unsuccessful attempts to build dams using state funds or private companies. Finally in 1933 the Civilian Conservation Corps, under the guidance of the Corps of Engineers, was tasked with flood control on the river. This was the first U.S. Army Corps of Engineers flood control project in New England. It was undertaken least in part by the newly formed Veterans Division of the CCC.

It was decided the Winooski River required the construction of three major dams. Two of them (the Wrightsville Dam and the East Barre Dam) were completed in 1935. The Wrightsville Dam stood over 1,200 feet long, 70 feet high with 100-foot spillways, utilized in excess of 1.5 million cubic yards of earth fill and rock, 5,000 cubic yards of concrete, and 2,500 tons of steel. It controlled the flow from 71 square miles of watershed. The East Barre Dam was only slightly smaller and controlled the flow from 38 square miles of watershed.

The third dam was at Waterbury, and though completed later it was larger than Wrightsville and East Barre combined. The earth-filled Waterbury Dam required more than 2 million cubic yards of earth, 5 million cubic yards of selected gravel, and the labor of more than 3,000 men to complete. When finished, the Waterbury Dam controlled the runoff from 109 square miles of watershed.

Little River State Park exists today thanks to the CCC as well.
