= Wrightsville Reservoir =

Reservoir in Vermont, United States

- Location within Vermont Location within the United States
- Location: Washington County, Vermont
- Coordinates: 44°19′0″N 72°34′30″W
- Type: Reservoir
- Primary inflows: Winooski River North Branch
- Primary outflows: Winooski River North Branch
- Basin countries: United States
- Max. length: 1.75 mi (2.82 km)
- Max. width: 0.2 mi (0.32 km)
- Settlements: Montpelier, Middlesex, East Montpelier, Tangletown, Wrightsville

Wrightsville Reservoir is a reservoir located in Washington County, Vermont, United States, as a result of the construction of the Wrightsville Dam built from 1933 to 1935 after the Great Flood of 1927. It is located at the intersection of the municipal borders of three towns, Montpelier, Middlesex, and East Montpelier. It is a popular recreational spot in the summer, for swimming, boating, and fishing in the Montpelier area.

During the July 2023 Northeastern United States floods, floodwaters reached the second highest recorded Winooski River level and threatened to spill the dam, but receded on the third day.

== History ==
In response to the damage suffered by Montpelier and surrounding communities in the Great Flood of 1927, the Civilian Conservation Corps built the Wrightsville Dam during a period from 1933 to 1935. The resulting reservoir required the disbandment and flooding of the village of Wrightsville, which contained at least 30 built structures at the time. The North Branch Cemetery was also forced to move in 1934, with the excavation and relocation of 651 graves dating back to the 1800s. The original construction, completed in 1935, was an earthfill retention dam 1,525 feet (465 m) long and 115 feet (35 m) high, faced with stone on one side for protection. It had a 645-foot (197 m) concrete conduit divided into three pipes. One was plugged, one went to the Wrightsville Hydroelectric Power Plant, and the third emptied through to the North Branch. It also had a spillway cut through the rock 30 feet (9.1 m) below the top of the dam.

The Wrightsville Dam was one of only four dam projects built concurrently from 1933 to 1935. The other three were the East Barre Dam, Waterbury Reservoir, and the Winooski River Local Protection Project. The costs from all four of these projects were conglomerated and calculated as one expenditure, totalling $13.7 million.

From October 1956 to September 1958, a modification was constructed to the dam which raised its top height 20 feet (6.1 m) and lengthened the dam a further 275 feet (84 m). The cost of this modification was $1.35 million.

On July 9, 2023, torrential rains in the Northeastern United States caused floodwaters to rise and by July 11 to approach the level of the Wrightsville Dam "at which a spillway would need to release water into the North Branch of the Winooski River", lest the dam would burst. Floodwaters which were at the second highest recorded level receded by night however.

== Recreation ==
Wrightsville Reservoir was originally constructed without any recreational facilities. In November 1964, the Corps began work on providing the lake with three recreational areas and completed the project in June 1967 at a cost of $204,600 (the state provided fireplaces, picnic tables, drinking water, and sanitary facilities). In November 1967, the Corps turned over these recreational areas to the Vermont Department of Environmental Conservation. One area, the Shady Rill Recreation Area, is approximately 1.25 miles (2.01 km) north of the dam (the 0.25 miles (0.40 km) long access road to Shady Rill is directly off Route 12). The Shady Rill Recreation Area offers picnicking on 10 tables and five fireplaces, a picnic shelter, an open field for ball playing, horseshoe pits, an 18 hole disc golf course, and sanitary facilities. Martins Brook, also known as Shady Rill Brook, offers picnickers a streamside environment.

The second recreation area is the Wrightsville Reservoir Boat Launch Area, located on Route 12, about 0.75 miles (1.21 km) north of the dam. This area offers a boat ramp and sanitary facilities. Cross-country skiing and snowmobiling on unmarked trails, as well as ice fishing, can be enjoyed during the winter.

The third recreational area built by the Corps at Wrightsville Reservoir has since been closed. However, in 1985, the Washington Electric Cooperative constructed a recreational facility in conjunction with the Wrightsville Hydroelectric Power Project it was concurrently building at Wrightsville Reservoir. This area, the Wrightsville Beach Recreation Area, is located on Route 12, about 1.25 miles (2.01 km) north of the dam (opposite the access road leading to the Shady Rill Recreation Area). The Wrightsville Beach Recreation Area offers picnicking on 36 tables, 11 fireplace grills, a picnic shelter, swimming on 350 feet (110 m) of beach, hiking on a 0.5 miles (0.80 km) long marked trail, an open field for ball playing, a small playground area, cold showers, drinking water, and sanitary facilities. Also offered are disc golf, horseshoe pits, and a volleyball net, with both the horseshoes and volleyball available in the office. When the Wrightsville Beach Recreation Area was completed, the Washington Electric Cooperative turned it over to the Wrightsville Beach Recreation District for operation and maintenance. The Wrightsville Beach Recreation District comprises the communities of Middlesex, Worcester, Montpelier, and East Montpelier. While most of the area of the lake is owned by the town of Middlesex, it is closer to Montpelier and is usually accessed from Vermont Route 12. and a boat launch, both near Route 12.

== See also ==
- List of dams and reservoirs in Vermont
- List of lakes in Vermont
