= July 2023 Northeastern United States floods =

Flood event in 2023

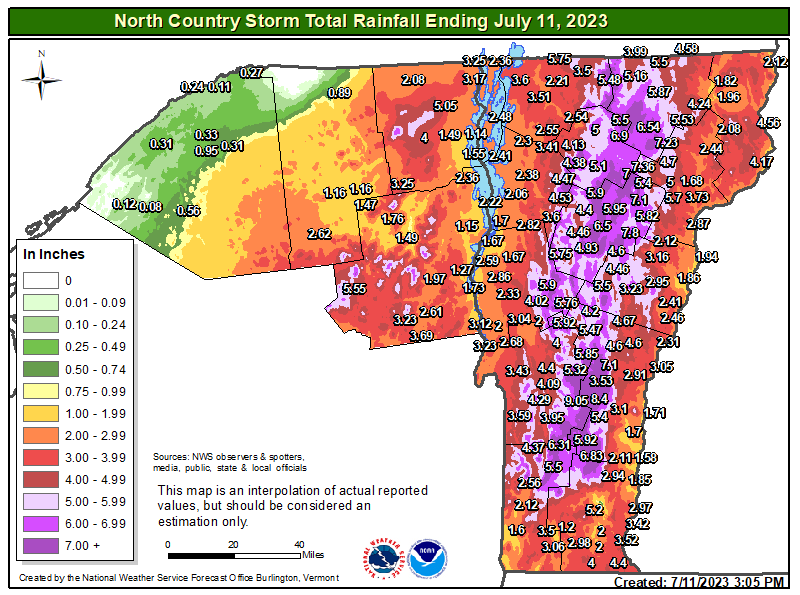
- Map of rainfall accumulations in the NWS Burlington's area of responsibility (Vermont and far northeastern New York) for the period July 9–11
- Cause: Heavy rains

Meteorological history
- Duration: July 9, 2023 – July 29, 2023

Flood
- Max. rainfall: 10.49 in (266 mm) in Putnam Valley, New York on July 10

Overall effects
- Fatalities: 11
- Damage: $2.2 billion (2023 USD)
- Areas affected: Northeastern United States (particularly New York and Vermont)

In July 2023, multiple rounds of heavy rainfall led to a destructive and significant flash flood event occurring in the Northeastern United States beginning from July 9 to 29, 2023. The floods were caused by slow-moving showers and thunderstorms that produced heavy rainfall and flooding over areas that were already saturated by rainfall that took place several weeks prior, especially across the Northeastern and Mid-Atlantic regions. However, the heaviest and most destructive flash flooding was concentrated around northern New England, especially Vermont and New York as widespread rain amounts of 6 inches (150 mm) fell in the two states on July 9–11. Additionally, downtown Montpelier, Vermont was flooded, along with numerous state roads being closed as a result of it; the highest rainfall total from the event was centered in Putnam Valley, New York, with 10.49 inches (266 mm). Across the affected areas, numerous roads and bridges were washed out, and dozens of water rescues were conducted. Transportation service was impacted by the heavy rainfall and flooding, including Amtrak in New York and Vermont and Boston's MBTA subway. The flash floods caused 11 fatalities across several states at least $2.2 billion in damage. The event was known as the Great Vermont Flood of 10–11 July 2023 by the National Weather Service in Burlington, Vermont after its significant impacts in the state on the respective dates.

== Meteorological history ==
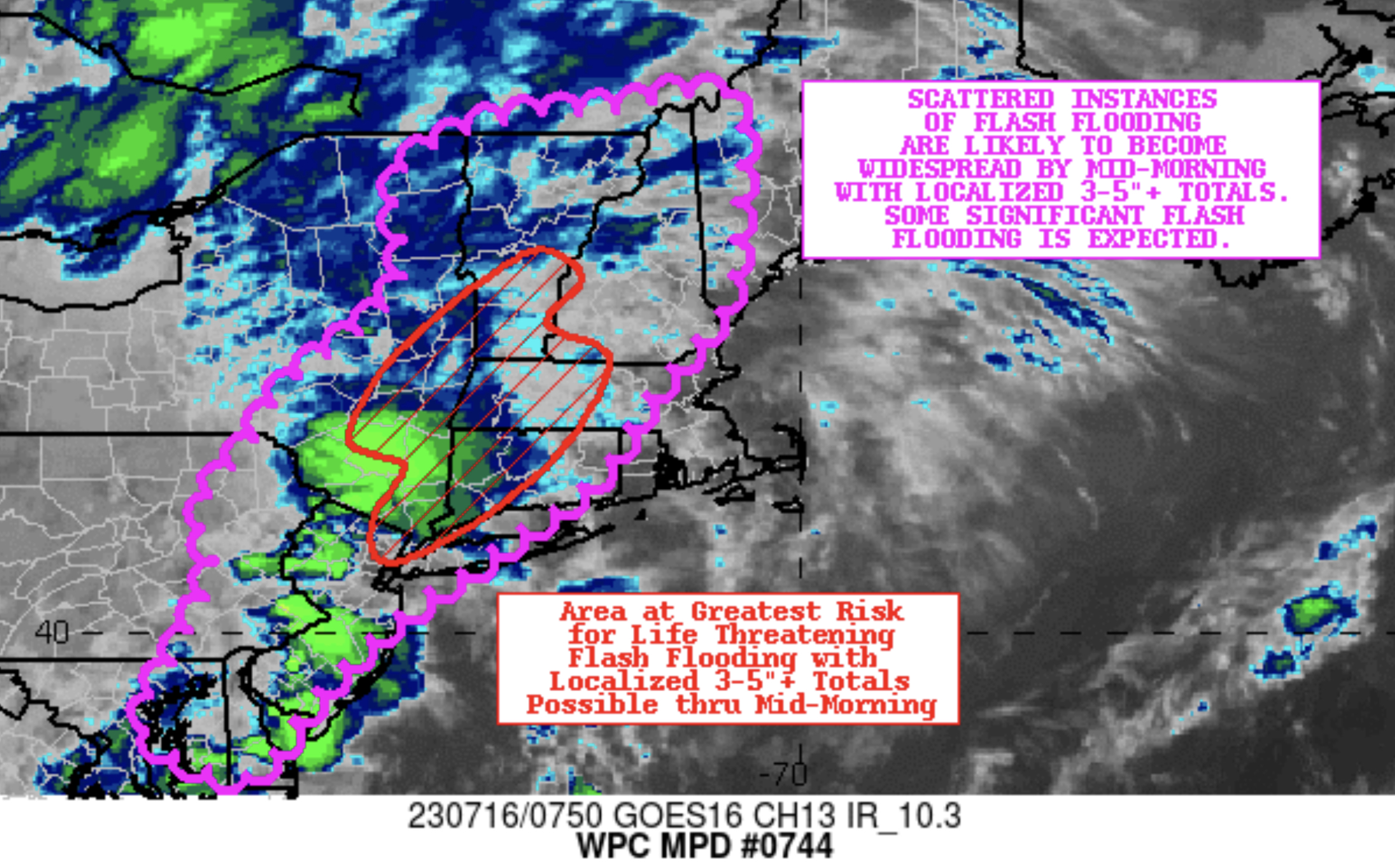
A mesoscale discussion from the Weather Prediction Center showing the risk of life-threatening flash floods during July 16.

On July 10, areas where the flooding occurred were already saturated by recent rainfall several weeks prior, and a large area of moisture traveled from the Atlantic Ocean to the Northeastern United States, likely contributed by warm waters of the Atlantic Ocean, where moisture evaporated and produced additional rainfall over New England. The storm, producing heavy rainfall, eventually slowed over the northeastern United States due to a large high pressure area over Greenland, which stalled the storm bringing high rainfall rates.

Flash flooding occurred again on July 16 following slow-moving showers and thunderstorms which developed along a cold front, which moved parallel to a deep southwesterly flow, causing the slow motion. Most unstable convective available potential energy in the 1500 j/kg range, along with moderate convective instability, maintained by the southwesterly flow, yielded re-development of the slow-moving showers and thunderstorms, and precipitable water around the 1.8-inch values also allowed the storms to produce heavy rainfall across portions of the Northeast.

On July 21, additional flash flooding occurred after a combination of a strong convergence zone and strengthening instability led to heavy rainfall-producing thunderstorms across portions of New England. Precipitable water values in the 1.5-1.7-inch range also allowed favorable conditions for very heavy thunderstorm development. The same precipitable water values, combined with an unstable moist environment, 1500 j/kg convective available potential energy (CAPE) values, and dew points in the 60–70 °F (16–21 °C) range caused additional thunderstorm development on July 29 producing heavy rainfall, leading to flash flooding.

== Preparations and impact ==
=== New York ===
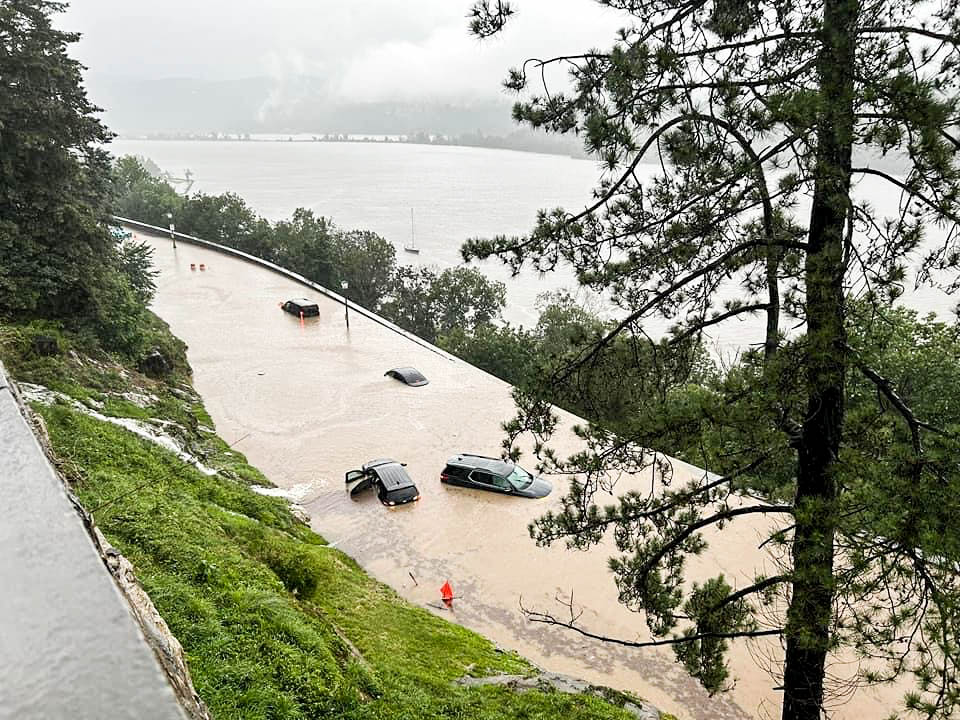
A flooded road in Orange County, New York, overlooking the Hudson River

Prior to the floods, state governor Kathy Hochul urged people to be aware of the weather and road conditions.

Flooding occurred at the United States Military Academy, inundating vehicles and forcing drivers to swim out of them. Multiple water rescues, mudslides, and flooded roads prompted the town of Cornwall to issue a No Travel Advisory. Portions of U.S. Route 9W and Palisades Interstate Parkway were washed out or collapsed and closed. Portions of New York State Route 218 were totally washed away by the floods. Areas near the Hudson River and in the Hudson Valley were flooded as a rare flash flood emergency was issued. A New York City-bound Amtrak train was stopped at Poughkeepsie due to reports of the train tracks south of Poughkeepsie being washed out, cutting off access to New York City, and was reversed and rerouted back to Rhinecliff. Amtrak Service was also suspended between New York City and Albany, as well as service from New York City to Burlington, Vermont also being suspended. In Saratoga County, U.S. Route 4 and New York State Route 32 were flooded with 2 ft (61 cm) of rainfall. Train service on Metro-North Railroad Hudson Line were stopped between Croton–Harmon and Poughkeepsie because of downed trees and damaged tracks. Due to the heavy rainfall, New York governor Kathy Hochul issued a state of emergency for Orange County, where 8 in (200 mm) of rain fell on Highland Falls and West Point in the eastern corner of the county. Significant flooding also occurred in Stony Point, where water rescues occurred and several homes and a park were flooded. Highland Falls also experienced significant flooding, with numerous streets in Highland Falls flooded and access to Highland Falls from Interstate 87 and U.S. Route 6 were closed due to flooding. Newburgh–Beacon Ferry Service was unavailable on July 10. CSX Tracks were compromised in 10 locations, with washed-out tracks between Selkirk and New Jersey. Roads were washed out in Carmel as well.

1,000 flights across New York airports, including LaGuardia Airport and John F. Kennedy International Airport, were cancelled, and more than 200 were delayed across those two airports. Rainfall in the Bronx forced a brief delay in an MLB game between the New York Yankees and Chicago Cubs. A 43-year-old woman drowned after bring swept away by floodwaters in Highland Falls.

Governor Hochul stated that damage would likely exceed $37 million, the threshold for a federal disaster declaration. New York United States Senator Chuck Schumer said on July 17 that the damage to West Point alone was in excess of $100 million according to the United States Army Corps of Engineers.

On July 16, additional flash floods affected the New York metropolitan area, this time focused on Long Island. Ground stops were imposed at LaGuardia Airport and John F. Kennedy International Airport. The flooding also led to a crash on New York State Route 27 late Sunday morning, injuring a police officer, with small parts of the highway closing. Heavy rain also resulted in a baseball game between the Los Angeles Dodgers and New York Mets be delayed by over 3 hours. In Islip, 3.04 in (77 mm) of rain poured down in one hour, causing flooding across roadways in and around Islip and in Suffolk County.

=== Vermont ===
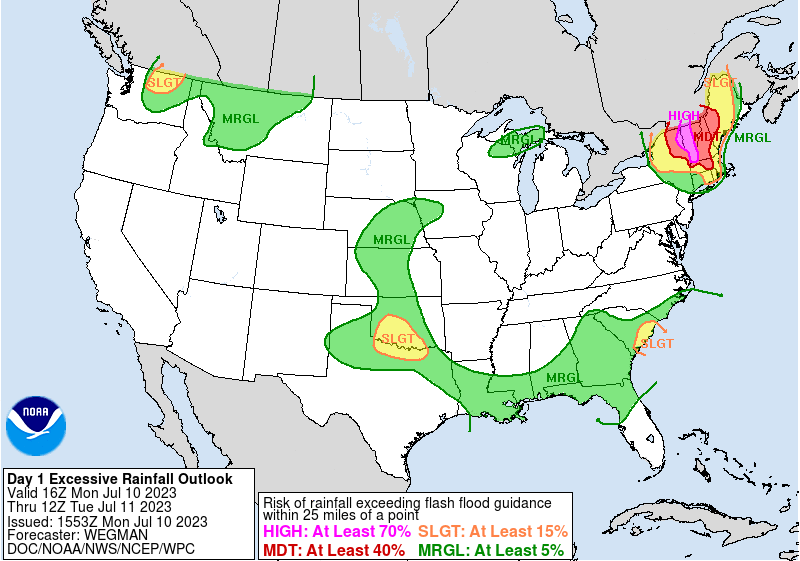
The Weather Prediction Center’s excessive rainfall outlook for July 10. This outlook included a rare Level 4–High Risk for most of Vermont.

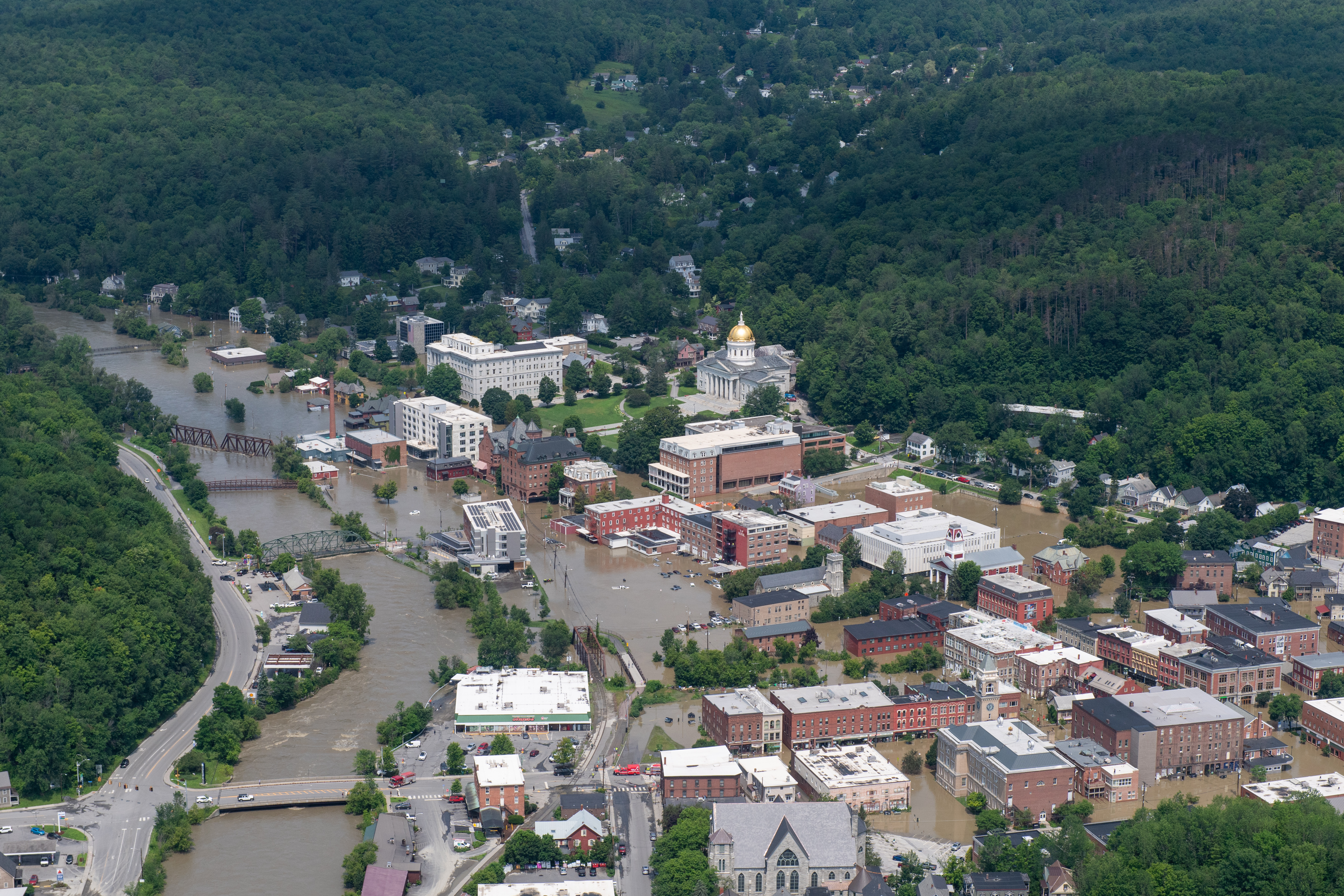
Flooding in downtown Montpelier, Vermont as photographed by the United States Air National Guard

On July 9, 2023, state governor Phil Scott declared a state of emergency, allowing the potential of out-of-state resources to be used for emergency responders in the state. The following day, the Weather Prediction Center issued their first ever high risk for flash flooding in the NWS Burlington coverage zone.

In Montpelier, a travel ban was initiated after floodwaters inundated roads across the downtown area; the floodwaters itself also prompted a boil water notice issued for the entire city amid warnings that the city's drinking water system could potentially be contaminated as a result. Several of the city's government buildings, including Montpelier City Hall, were flooded and some were forced to relocate. Additionally, numerous businesses and homes were destroyed after flooding left them uninhabitable and unable to operate; this included a United States Postal Service building in the city's downtown area which did not open until 15 months later. Residents in the city were also forced to evacuate low-lying areas and locations near the Winooski River, the latter of which was prompted after the river crested to flood levels. The National Weather Service also issued their first flash flood emergency not just for Vermont, but for anywhere in Northern New England. Both directions of Interstate 89 was closed after debris was strewn across the roadway by the floodwaters, and flooding also closed numerous state roads, including Vermont Route 16. Roads were flooded in Londonderry and Weston, rendering them impassable; both towns were considered the "epicenter" of the flood impacts in Vermont as evacuations were ordered for portions of both communities. Additionally, the West River at times crested to flood levels, which in turn affected both towns; the damage resulting from there overall and the state itself was described by officials as "worse than Hurricane Irene". Nearly a dozen campers in Andover were rescued by swift boat after the bridge entering and exiting out of Andover was washed out. Rainfall totals reached 9.20 in (234 mm) in Calais. On July 11, water levels at the Wrightsville Dam crested, threatening to burst the dam or necessitating to open a spillway. By evening levels receded. The flooding prompted emergency management to rescue 44 people. Two fatalities were connected to the floods: one in Barre and one on the Appalachian Trail near Stockbridge.

Thunder Road International SpeedBowl in Barre was scheduled to host the second event of the 2023 Superstar Racing Experience auto racing season on July 20, but the event was cancelled as result of the floods, with week 2 of the competition moving to Stafford Motor Speedway in Connecticut on the same day as the scheduled Thunder Road race.

=== Connecticut ===
As thunderstorms developed across Litchfield County on July 9 and 10, heavy rainfall associated with the storms produced nearly 5 inches (130 mm) in Norfolk, producing flooding in the town and across the county, and also prompting an emergency declaration to be signed as a result of the significant flooding. A portion of Connecticut Route 272 in Norfolk was washed out by floodwaters, and numerous other state routes across Connecticut were closed as a result of the flooding, including portions of U.S. Route 7 and Connecticut Routes 63 and 126. Flooding and downed trees forced road closures in Greenwich, Danbury, New Milford, New London, and Ridgefield, and several homes in Kent were evacuated because of flooding. Numerous flash flood warnings were issued for portions of Fairfield, Hartford, Middlesex, and New London counties. Flash flooding also resulted in the closures of J.A. Minetto State Park and Indian Well State Park. The heaviest rainfall occurred across northwestern parts of the state, with Norfolk receiving 10.3 in (260 mm) and 5.52 in (140 mm) falling in Warren on July 9.

Additional heavy rains fell on July 16, producing more flooding across the state which forced more road closures and damaged infrastructures. A tornado watch was issued by the National Weather Service for the entire state a day prior, which concerned the storms that would later produce the later heavy rainfall. Flooding forced Tweed New Haven Airport to shut down temporarily and closed portions of U.S. Route 44 and Connecticut Routes 17 and 167, among numerous other roadways. In Bristol, six people were rescued from their inundated vehicles, while in Waterbury, vehicles became stranded as a result of the floodwaters. A swollen Connecticut River swept away a woman who was later rescued, and caused significant damage to around 2,000 acres (3.1 sq mi) of crop field along the river near Glastonbury. The Pequabuck River overflowed, damaging a Connecticut Route 229 bridge near its intersection with Route 72. In Wolcott, a bridge partially collapsed following the overflow of a pond caused by excessive rainfall. Additionally, a microburst associated with the flood-producing storms caused sporadic tree and flashing damage in Wethersfield. A jazz festival in Hartford was cancelled; the heaviest rain fell in Hartford County as well, with one location receiving 3.38 in (86 mm). Overall, flooding and severe weather events from both days totaled $1.68 million in damage.

Five days later, additional rainfall occurred as a result of thunderstorms developing across the state, with a severe thunderstorm watch being issued for all of Connecticut's eight counties as some storms became severe with damaging wind gusts. Widespread tree and power line damage occurred in several towns including Chaplin, Naugatuck, Scotland, and Windham. Flooding was observed in areas around Hartford–Brainard Airport, and in East Hartford. Several more rounds of thunderstorms developed on July 29; a tornado warning was issued for Tolland and Windham counties, and a funnel cloud was reported in Storrs. Severe thunderstorm wind gusts resulted in property damage totaling $61,500 on both July 21 and 29, including $44,000 on July 21 alone.

=== Massachusetts ===
A flash flood watch was issued for western portions of the state on July 9, where a moderate risk of excessive rainfall was in place by the Weather Prediction Center's outlook. On the same day, a portion of Massachusetts Route 57 was flooded in Tolland, and basements were inundated by floodwaters in northwestern parts of the state. In North Adams, heavy rainfall flooded twenty city roads, including Massachusetts Route 8, where a sinkhole also occurred as a result. The city also was impacted by landslides, and the historic Hillside Cemetery was damaged. The Mill River, a tributary of the Connecticut River located in Hampshire County near Northampton crested, flooding several homes and forcing people to flee them as a result in Williamsburg. The Connecticut River itself also overflowed and flooded farms near Amherst, while heavy rainfall caused a river dam near Montague, which held 10,000 cubic feet (280 m^{3}) of water per second, to flow ten times that rate. The Deerfield River also overflowed, leading to road and bridge closures in Greenfield. Most of the heavy rainfall was centered across northern and northwestern portions of the state, near the Vermont and New York state borders, where Conway received 4.58 inches (116 mm) and Ashfield with 4.12 inches (105 mm) of rainfall. Nine towns across western portions of the state declared states of emergencies as a result of the flooding on July 9 and 10, including Ashfield, Heath, and Hinsdale.

A flood watch was initiated for all but southeastern parts of the state on July 15, and a tornado watch was also issued for almost the same areas under a flood watch on the afternoon the next day, in regards to the threat of tornadic activity accompanying the heavy rainfall-producing storms. As a result of heavy rainfall, flooding caused vehicles to be stranded in an underpass on U.S. Route 20 in Worcester, and emergency crews pumped out floodwaters from several inundated basements in Fitchburg. In the latter city, roads and yards were washed out and severe, widespread property damage occurred there. Also in Fitchburg, gas lines were shut off as a result of damaged roadways caused by flooding, and floodwaters itself caused road pavement to buckle there and in Sturbridge. Numerous vehicles were inundated with floodwaters across the state, including some on Massachusetts Route 68 in Hubbardston. Heavy rainfall led to a sewer discharge into a portion of the Boston Harbor, prompting a public health emergency there and warning people to avoid contact with the affected waters for 48 hours. Another sewer discharge occurred for the same reasons, where nearly 90,000 US gallons (340 m^{3}) of untreated sewage and waste overflowed in Greenfield along the Green River at a rate of 529 US gallons (2.00 m^{3}) per minute, which also flowed into the Deerfield River nearby and the Connecticut River downstream. The Connecticut River was already affected by a separate sewer discharge, where rainfall on July 15 caused 6,542,156 US gallons (24,764.75 m^{3}) of wastewater to be discharged across multiple areas in Holyoke into the river. Nearly 2,000 acres (3.1 sq mi) of crops were lost, totaling an estimated $15 million, stemming from 75 farms as a result of the flooding. A woman was killed after the car she was in as a passenger hydroplaned and struck another vehicle on Interstate 93 in Wilmington. Additionally, an EF0 tornado was initiated by a squall line in North Brookfield that was part of the system that produced flooding across the state, causing only minor tree damage. There were also several tornado warnings issued as well, with six of them being issued in Massachusetts and New Hampshire.

More flash flooding affected parts of the state on July 21, including across Greater Boston. A baseball game between the Boston Red Sox and New York Mets was suspended in the fourth inning as a result of the exceptionally heavy rain that sent water cascading down stairs at Fenway Park. Boston Logan International Airport recorded 1.75 in (44 mm) of rain in just over an hour. Further west, flash flooding was reported in numerous cities and towns and also caused many roads to close, including portions of U.S. Route 1, U.S. Route 5, and several Massachusetts state routes. Additionally, various vehicles were inundated with floodwaters across roads and parking lots. The heaviest rainfall occurred in Franklin County, with Conway receiving 7 in (180 mm) and Montague recording 5.41 in (137 mm). Heavy rainfall also led to 9,000,000 US gallons (34,000 m^{3}) of sewage water, with some of it untreated, flowing into the Charles River and affecting the Alewife Brook Reservation nearby. Vermonter train service was halted after a side track was washed out in Deerfield.

Additional flooding and severe thunderstorm damages occurred the state on July 29. In Roxbury, several vehicles were inundated with floodwaters after attempting to cross flooded roadways. Difficult driving conditions caused by the storms led to a rollover crash on Memorial Drive in Cambridge, seriously injuring the driver. In Newton, eastbound Massachusetts Route 9 was flooded after sewage drains overflowed as a result of heavy rainfall, while a portion of Interstate 93 was flooded in Dorchester, a neighborhood of Boston. At Fort Point Channel, heavy rainfall led to a sewer discharge, which resulted in wastewater flowing to there, East Boston, and parts of the Boston Harbor, prompting a public health emergency by the Boston Public Health Commission. In Greater Boston, numerous roads were flooded, including Beacon Street and Storrow Drive in Brookline; Morrissey Boulevard in Dorchester; and Commonwealth Avenue. This resulted in several cars being stalled in floodwaters there. As a flash flood warning was in effect for the city of Boston, flooding caused delays on MBTA subway's Green Line C branch service between Cleveland Circle and Coolidge Corner stations. In Andover, 3.18 in (81 mm) of rain fell, while Boston received 3 in (76 mm). In addition to multiple flash flood warnings, several tornado and severe thunderstorm warnings were also issued throughout the state. The storms also produced an EF0 tornado in Foxborough, Norfolk County, which was very brief and downed trees, with one of them knocking a chimney over. Property damage totaled at least $15,500 as a result of the storms on July 29, including $5,000 from the Foxborough tornado. Strong winds also blew down trees and power lines, which resulted in nearly 1,000 power outages across southeastern parts of the state with a large amount of them centered in Plymouth County.

=== New Hampshire ===
Flooding and damages were most concentrated across southwestern, western, and northern portions of the state on July 9 and 10. In Swanzey, numerous roads were washed out or flooded and were closed. A religious camp in the town was severely damaged; evacuations were ordered for hundreds of people there after the roads around it and the campground itself was flooded. A 600 feet (0.11 mi) portion of New Hampshire Route 10 was washed out in Winchester, forcing the affected section to close; it re-opened five days later. The Crayon 301 NASCAR race was postponed due to flash floods on July 16. The Forest Lake Dam in Winchester failed on July 10, causing water levels to drop by 4 ft (1.2 m).

The Mall of New Hampshire delayed its opening hours on July 16. In Manchester, roads and basements were flooded, and mall parking lots were flooded, inundating vehicles. Pavement on roads buckled in Hillsborough due to flooding. Flash flood warnings were issued for portions of the state, and more flash flood warnings were issued in July 2023 alone than any other full year on record.

=== Rhode Island ===
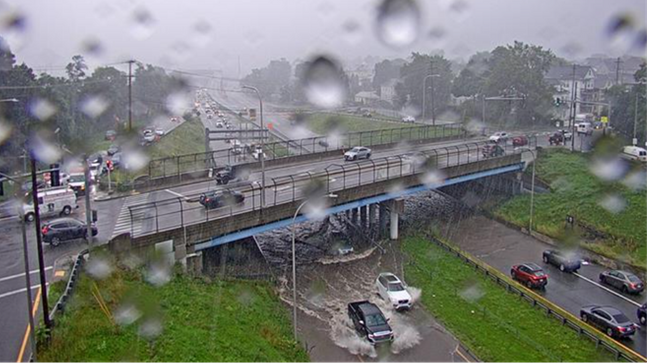
Flooding on Rhode Island Route 10 captured from a Rhode Island Department of Transportation traffic camera on July 10

As a flood watch was in effect for the entire state on July 9 and 10, a portion of Rhode Island Route 10 was temporarily shut down in Providence because of flooding. Significant flooding was reported on Rhode Island Route 146 just north of Providence, and flash flooding occurred across multiple locations in the state, including Providence, East Providence, and Cranston. At a street intersection in Pawtucket, vehicles were inundated with floodwaters and immobilized. In recovery efforts, Rhode Island State Police assisted with stalled vehicles, while snowplows were deployed in Providence to push out floodwaters from roadways. Flood warnings were also issued, which included parts of Bristol, Kent, Providence, and Washington counties. Route 10 was again shut down for the same reason prior on July 16, along with a portion of Interstate 95 also closed. Several roads in East Providence and Cranston were flooded and impassable on the same day, while areas including Pawtucket, Central Falls, and Warwick experienced lesser impacts from the former two towns, only experiencing minor flooding across roadways. A tree fell on U.S. Route 6 in Foster as well.

Flood and severe thunderstorm watches were issued on July 27 as severe thunderstorms progressed across the state. Damaging thunderstorm winds resulted in $2,300 in property damages across the state. Two days later, an additional $800 in property damages were caused by another round of severe thunderstorms causing wind damage.

=== Pennsylvania ===
A flood watch was issued by the National Weather Service for parts of central and eastern parts of the state on July 8 as those portions were noted in at least a slight risk of excessive rainfall from a Weather Prediction Center outlook. In Montgomery County, a portion of eastbound Pennsylvania Turnpike was shut down after debris blocking nearby storm drains caused flooding on the interstate. Flooding displaced at least 40 people in Reading; water rescues were also conducted there. At Reading Regional Airport, 5.35 in (136 mm) of rain fell on July 9, surpassing the previous daily rainfall record of 5.32 in (135 mm) set in 2004. Nearly 7 in (180 mm) of rain fell in a 24-hour period in West Lawn, while portions of the Philadelphia area were flooded. In Conshohocken, Upper Merion Township, and parts of Berks County, floodwaters inundated and stranded several vehicles; downed wires also occurred in the former two locations. Nearly 300 roads were closed in the state due to flooding, including Pennsylvania Routes 12 and 222. Roads were washed out in Quakertown, prompting at least one water rescue. A baseball game between the York Revolution and the Lexington Counter Clocks was postponed as a result of heavy rainfall. The effects from the flooding on July 9 caused more than 12,000 power outages and small business losses of at least $100,000.

On July 15, a thunderstorm produced heavy rainfall in Upper Makefield Township in Bucks County, causing flash flooding. A bridge was washed out there as a result of an overflow of the Delaware River, leaving several vehicles submerged in floodwaters, killing seven people. Pennsylvania Route 532, the road where the accident occurred, was shut down for two weeks following the flooding. Additionally, up to 7 in (180 mm) of rain fell in 45 minutes in the surrounding area. More heavy rains fell on July 16, prompting an MLB game between the Philadelphia Phillies and San Diego Padres to be delayed. Portions of the state also was impacted by flooding on the same day, especially in Northampton County, where severe flash floods occurred and flood damages totaled at $7.55 million. Overall, on all three days, severe weather damages, including some caused by floods, totaled $10.184 million and caused seven fatalities and five injuries from a 21-day period beginning on July 9. (Note: This includes $7.55 million in flood damages from Northampton County, and the aforementioned seven fatalities in Upper Makefield Township. An additional $100,000 is added here as well from the small business losses occurring on July 9. The other $2.534 million damage total and five injuries are according to the National Centers for Environmental Information.)

=== New Jersey ===
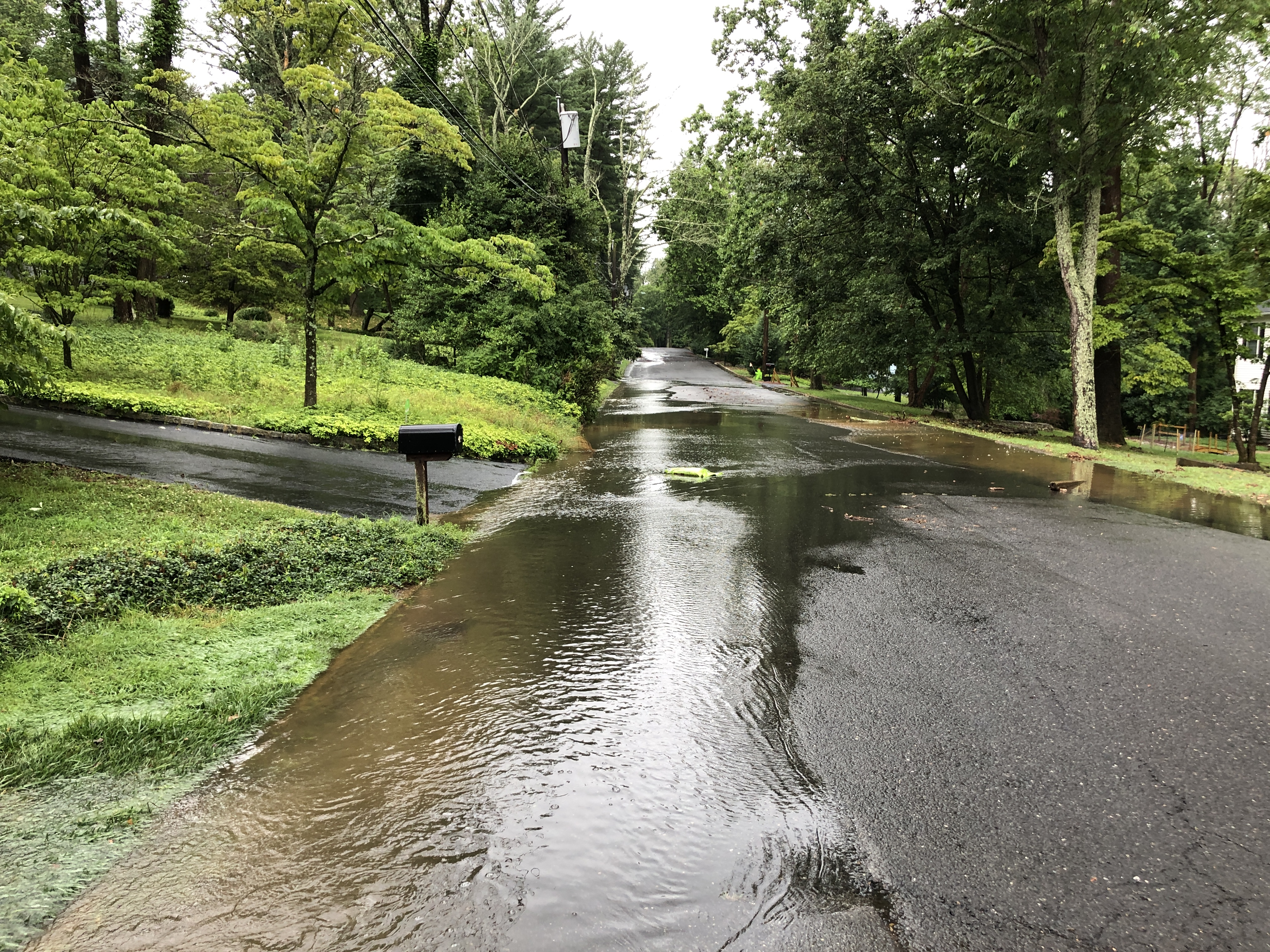
A flooded road in Ewing Township on July 15

All 21 counties in the state were under a flood watch on July 9, as much of New Jersey was included in a moderate risk of excessive rainfall from an outlook released by the Weather Prediction Center. Fourteen counties were also included in a severe thunderstorm watch as portions of the state were under a slight risk for severe weather highlighted from a Day 1 Storm Prediction Center outlook. The Ramapo, North Branch Raritan, and South Branch Raritan rivers all crested to minor flood stages as a result of heavy rainfall that occurred on that same day and July 10. A ground stop was initiated at Newark Liberty International Airport on July 9, and almost 400 flights were cancelled there the next day. Numerous roads were flooded across the state, including New Jersey Routes 44, 49, and 94, as well as U.S. Route 22, the latter route of which had one of its three westbound lanes closed near Phillipsburg. Flash flood warnings were also issued for parts of New Jersey; the heaviest rainfall occurred in Clifton, where 5.22 in (133 mm) fell.

Additional heavy rainfall began on July 13 and continued at times until July 16 across parts of the state. A portion of U.S. Route 46 in Warren County closed after a landslide developed on the side of the highway. The route was not reopened until July 30 as drainage areas were fixed and improved following the flooding and 5,000,000 pounds (2,300,000 kg) of debris was cleaned up after it was strewn across the roadway, which left parts of the highway extensively damaged. As parts of the county received more than 7 in (180 mm) of rainfall, mudslides damaged several homes in Warren County and left them uninhabitable, including several as a result of the landslide on U.S. Route 46. There were also 100 people were displaced countywide as a result of the severe weather. U.S. Route 1 was closed near Edison as all lanes of the highway were flooded, with several vehicles reportedly being inundated with floodwaters there. A three-day rainfall total of 12.24 in (311 mm) was recorded in White Township, including 7.24 in (184 mm) of which fell on July 15. There were around 15,000 power outages across the state, including 1,500 of which occurred in Warren County. At Newark Liberty International Airport, 367 flights were cancelled and an additional 477 were delayed on July 16. Severe thunderstorm wind-related property damages across the state amounted to $13,000. As a result of the severe weather and flooding, state governor Phil Murphy declared a state of emergency. On July 28, Murphy also requested president Joe Biden to approve a disaster declaration for the state, which was accepted on August 14.

== Aftermath ==
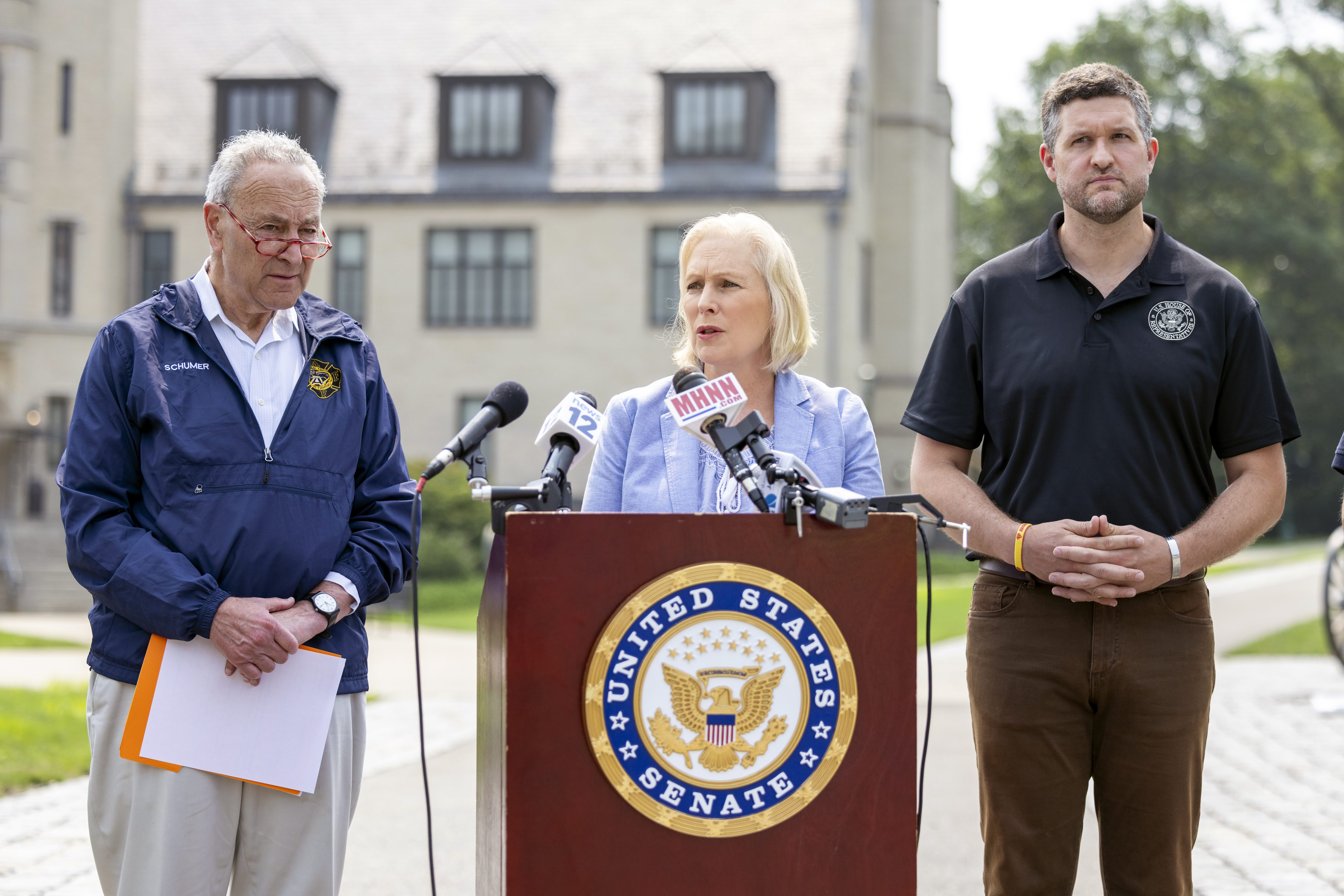
U.S. Senators from New York Chuck Schumer and Kirsten Gillibrand and U.S. representative from New York's 18th congressional district Pat Ryan speak at the United States Military Academy after receiving a tour of storm damage.

The American Red Cross opened a shelter to assist displaced people and as a center for needed supplies in Highland Falls, New York. The American Red Cross and the Reading Fire Department assisted in water rescues in Reading, Pennsylvania and an emergency shelter was opened at an elementary school in the city. Due to storm damage, Bear Mountain State Park and Harriman State Park were closed. An emergency shelter was opened in Barre. President Joe Biden declared a state of emergency for Vermont and ordered federal assistance to help with relief efforts.

On July 11, New Hampshire governor Chris Sununu toured and surveyed flood-damaged areas, including the failed Forest Lake Dam. The Federal Emergency Management Agency assessed damage around New Hampshire, including Antrim from July 11, continuing through the week of July 25 as well.

On July 12, Massachusetts governor Maura Healey toured the flooding damage in Williamsburg, and offered state assistance. Healey also spoke with the Massachusetts Emergency Management Agency regarding the floods.

On July 16, Connecticut governor Ned Lamont toured Bristol, Connecticut, and stated that engineers would assess road damage. Chuck Schumer and Kirsten Gillibrand, U.S. Senators from New York, and Pat Ryan, U.S. representative from New York's 18th congressional district, were given an aerial tour of the United States Military Academy and the surrounding area to survey the storm damage on July 17.

On August 1, following the flooding, the United States Department of Agriculture designated seven counties in Massachusetts as disaster areas. Also on August 1, the Tennessee Emergency Management Agency deployed two personnel to Vermont to aid in the aftermath of the flooding in Vermont. The day after, Massachusetts governor Healey signed a supplemental budget of $20 million to aid in Massachusetts farms which were impacted by the flooding. On August 3, U.S. senator Ed Markey visited flooded areas in Conway, Massachusetts, and announced a climate bill.

Vermont band Phish raised over $3,500,000 through benefit concerts for flood relief in their home state.
