= Tangletown =

Tangletown may refer to:

- Tangletown, Minneapolis, a neighborhood in Minnesota
- Tangletown, Seattle, a neighborhood in Washington state
- Tangletown, Vermont, an unincorporated area in Middlesex, Washington County

== See also ==
- Tangle Towns, a puzzle contest promoted by several newspapers
