= QPE =

QPE may refer to:

- Quantitative precipitation estimation, a rainfall estimation method
- Quizalofop-P-ethyl, a herbicide
