= Union Bank (Morrisville, Vermont) =

U.S. community bank

Union Bank, Inc.
- Type: Corporation, Subsidiary
- Industry: Financial services
- Founded: 1891
- Headquarters: Morrisville, VT, United States
- Area served: Vermont, New Hampshire
- Number of employees: 200 (2022)
- Website: www.ublocal.com

Union Bank, a wholly owned subsidiary of Union Bankshares, Inc., is a U.S. community bank based in Morrisville, Vermont. The bank provides commercial, retail, and municipal banking services and asset management services throughout Northern Vermont and New Hampshire. The bank operates 18 branches, three loan centers and several ATMs in the region.

== History ==
Union Bank was founded in 1891 and was known as The Union Savings Bank and Trust Company until 1974, when its name was changed to Union Bank. In 1983, Union Bank was incorporated in Vermont and became a registered bank holding company. It maintains its headquarters in Morrisville, Vermont and is a full-service financial institution, offering financial services for consumers, businesses, and municipalities.

In Vermont, the bank operates branches in Berlin, Fairfax, Hardwick, Jeffersonville, Jericho, Lyndonville, Morrisville, Shelburne, St. Albans, St. Johnsbury, Stowe, and Williston. New Hampshire locations include Groveton, Lincoln, Littleton, and North Conway. Loan centers are located in St. Johnsbury and Williston.

In 2019, the St. Johnsbury branch was used as a set for the Michael Worth film Apple Seed.

The Johnson, Vermont branch was permanently closed in September 2024 after an armed robbery in March of that year and catastrophic flooding in the area in July 2023.

== Operations ==
The bank focuses on traditional community banking activities, taking deposits and making loans. The bank originates loans for marketplace lenders and processes payments. As of June 2022, the bank has assets of approximately $1.2 billion and more than 200 employees throughout its branch offices and corporate headquarters in Vermont and New Hampshire.

== Services ==
Union Bank offers checking and savings accounts, personal and business loans, asset management, cash management, and merchant services.
