= Quantitative precipitation estimation =

Amount of precipitation inferred from proxy data

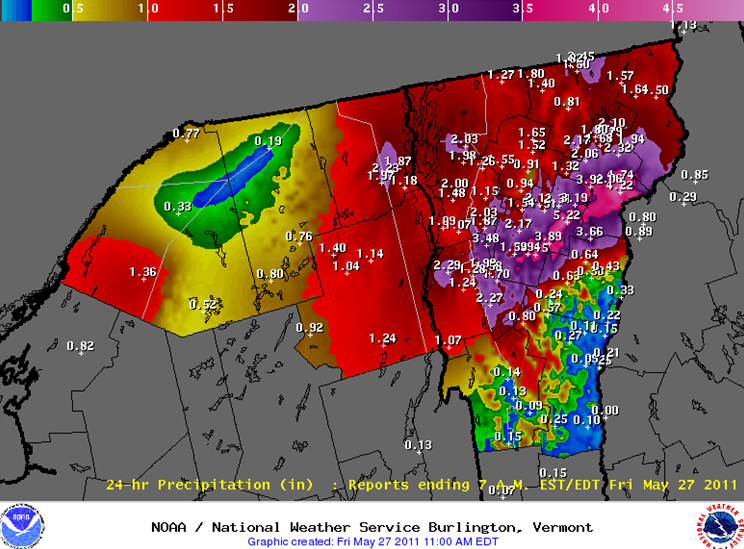
Color map of QPE for May 26 to 27, 2011, with pluviometers data added, for the National Weather Service Burlington, Vermont coverage area.

Quantitative precipitation estimation or QPE is a method of approximating the amount of precipitation that has fallen at a location or across a region. Maps of the estimated amount of precipitation to have fallen over a certain area and time span are compiled using several different data sources including manual and automatic field observations and radar and satellite data. This process is undertaken every day across the United States at Weather Forecast Offices (WFOs) run by the National Weather Service (NWS).

A number of different algorithms can be used to estimate precipitation amounts from data collected by radar, satellites, or other remote sensing platforms. Research in the fields of QPE and quantitative precipitation forecasting (QPF) is ongoing. Recent research in the field suggests using commercial microwave links for environmental monitoring in general and precipitation measurements in particular.
