= Jail Branch River =

River in Vermont, United States

Coordinates: 44.1279969°N 72.4383121°W

The Jail Branch River is a river in central Vermont. It is a tributary of the Stevens Branch of the Winooski River and part of the Lake Champlain watershed.

The Jail Branch is a 16-mile-long river that rises in Washington, Vermont, and flows north into Orange, where it comes under the influence of the state of Vermont's East Barre Dam. Orange Brook and its tributaries Baker Brook, Nelson Brook, and Nate Smith Brook enter the Jail Branch before it flows into Barre. Turning northwest, the river passes through East Barre; Honey Brook and its tributaries enter from the north before it descends through a narrow valley to the center of Barre, where it enters the Stevens Branch just south (upstream) of the downtown. The watershed area is 31,050 acres (12,570 ha). The Jail Branch River supports a healthy wild brook trout population and has had few pollution problems in recent years.

On May 26, 2005, the Jail Branch was the site of the drowning of three children, whose bodies were found in Barre at 5:45 a.m. local time; authorities described the incident as an apparent accident.

== The East Barre Dam ==
The East Barre Dam was built in response to the 1927 flood. The flood set state records and hit the Winooski River Valley and tributaries the hardest. Eighty-four people died as a result of the flood statewide, and the downtown of Barre was decimated from the flooding of the Jail Branch and Stevens Branch rivers. Nowadays, the dam protects the city from flooding almost yearly, as the area above the dam floods semi-yearly but the controlled flow of water into Barre cuts back considerably on the amount of flood damage.

== See also ==
- List of rivers of Vermont
