= Edson A. Putnam =

American politician

Edson A. Putnam (October 14, 1832 – October 23, 1917) was an American politician and businessman.

Born in Middlesex, Vermont, Putman moved with his parents to Oakfield, Wisconsin in 1855. He manufactured window blinds. Putman served as town school superintendent. Putnam also served on the Fond du Lac County, Wisconsin Board of Supervisors and was chairman of the board. He was a Republican. In 1876, Putnam served in the Wisconsin State Assembly. He died in Oakfield, Wisconsin.
