= Reading Fire Department =

Emergency services in Pennsylvania, United States

Operational area
- Country: United States
- State: Pennsylvania
- City: Reading

Agency overview
- Established: March 17, 1773
- Annual calls: 30,660 (2019)
- Employees: 141 (2025)
- Annual budget: $26,300,000 (2025)
- Staffing: Career
- Fire chief: Robert Leonard II
- IAFF: 1803

Facilities and equipment
- Battalions: 1
- Stations: 6
- Engines: 5
- Tillers: 2
- Platforms: 1
- Rescues: 1
- Ambulances: 4
- Wildland: 3
- Rescue boats: 1

Website
- Official website

The Reading Fire Department provides fire protection and emergency medical services to the city of Reading, Pennsylvania. The department is responsible for approximately 10 square miles (26 km^{2}) with a population of 94,000 as of the 2024 United States Census Bureau estimate.

== History ==
The Reading Fire Department was formed on March 17, 1773, as a volunteer fire department known as the Rainbow Volunteer Fire Company. By 1914 the department had grown to include 14 separate volunteer companies. Today, the department operates out of 7 fire stations, including 1 EMS Station.

Beginning in April 2011 Engines 13 and 14 were disbanded due to budget cuts. Starting June 30, 2015 the city will also be disbanding its non-emergency transport division for wheelchair users.

As of January 1, 2016, the department is now a fully career department.

As of February 12, 2020 the volunteer SCUBA team has been disbanded.

== Stations and apparatus ==
As of July 2025, below is a complete list of the stations and apparatus. Staffing is only two (2) firefighters per apparatus.

As of January 1st, 2026 staffing is 2 firefighters and 1 lieutenant on all ladder companies. The rescue is staffed by a firefighter a lieutenant. All remaining apparatus is two firefighters.

Engine Company	Ladder Company	Special Unit	Spare/ Reserve Unit	Chief Unit	Neighborhood
Engine 1		Medic 1	ATV 1, Engine 6 (Reserve)		Center City
Engine 3	Ladder 1(Tiller)	Medic 3, Squad 600, Brush 1, Marine 1		EMS Supervisor	Central West
Engine 5			Engine 4 (Reserve), Tower 2 (reserve)	Deputy Chief EMS	18th Ward
Engine 9	Ladder 3(Tiller)	Medic 9	Engine 10 (reserve)	1st Deputy Chief	Northeast
Engine 7		Medic 7, Brush 2	Ladder 2 (reserve), Medic 2, 5, 6, 8 (Reserve), Spare K9 unit, Spare Squad 600		Northwest
	Tower 1	Rescue 1	Rescue 2 (reserve)	2nd Deputy Chief	South Central
