= Waterbury Dam =

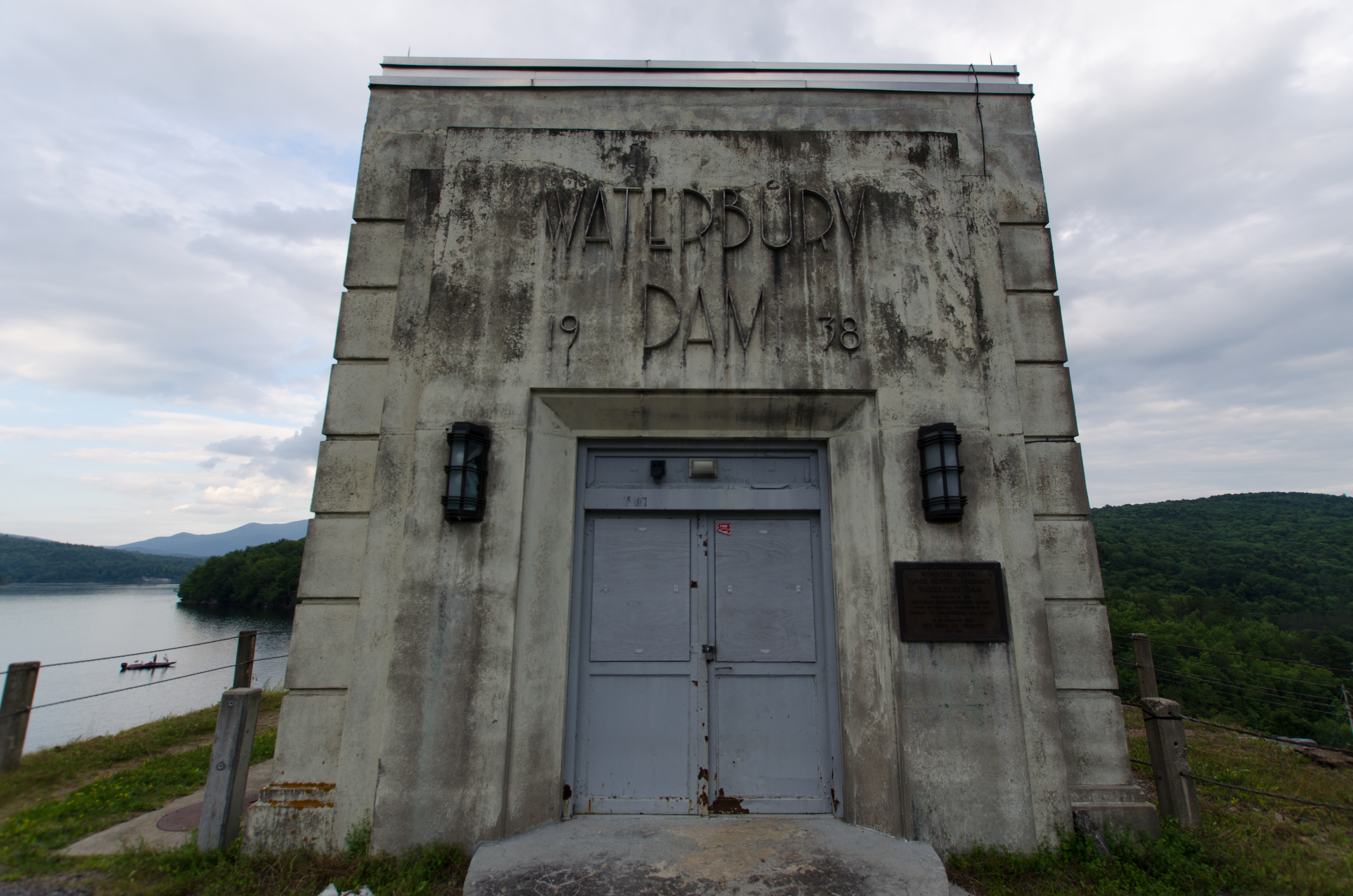
- Official name: Waterbury Dam
- Location: Waterbury, Vermont
- Coordinates: 44°22′54″N 72°46′18″W
- Construction began: 1935
- Opening date: 1938
- Operator(s): State of Vermont

Dam and spillways
- Impounds: Little River
- Height: 190 ft (58 m)
- Length: 1,845 ft (562 m)

Reservoir
- Creates: Waterbury Reservoir

The Waterbury Dam was built between 1935 and 1938 by 2,000 men working for the Corps of Engineers, United States Army, to serve as one of three dams to control the flow of Little River, Vermont, Winooski River and its tributaries. In 1927, flood waters from the Winooski River killed over 55 people and caused an estimated $13,000,000 in damage. Along with flood control, the dam generates electric energy, generating an average of 15,000,000 kilowatt-hours (54,000,000 MJ) annually.

The 1,845 feet (562 m) long dam is filled with 2,200,000 cubic yards (1,700,000 m^{3}) of material, including 3,490 cubic yards (2,668 m^{3}) of clay in its center portion. The rocks, which serve as the dam's walls, were hand-placed during the dam's original construction in 1938. The dam was modified in 1957 and 1958 to provide for increased security.

The dam and the reservoir it creates, the Waterbury Reservoir, are located in the town of Waterbury in northwestern Washington County.

== Media ==
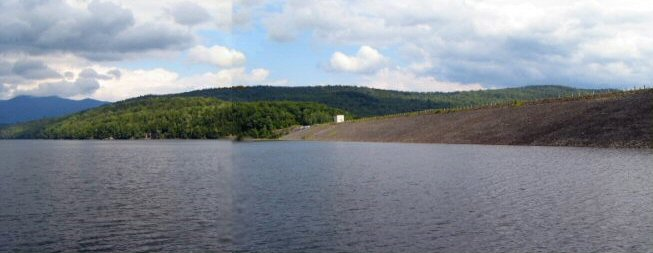
Waterbury Dam from the west side of the Little River

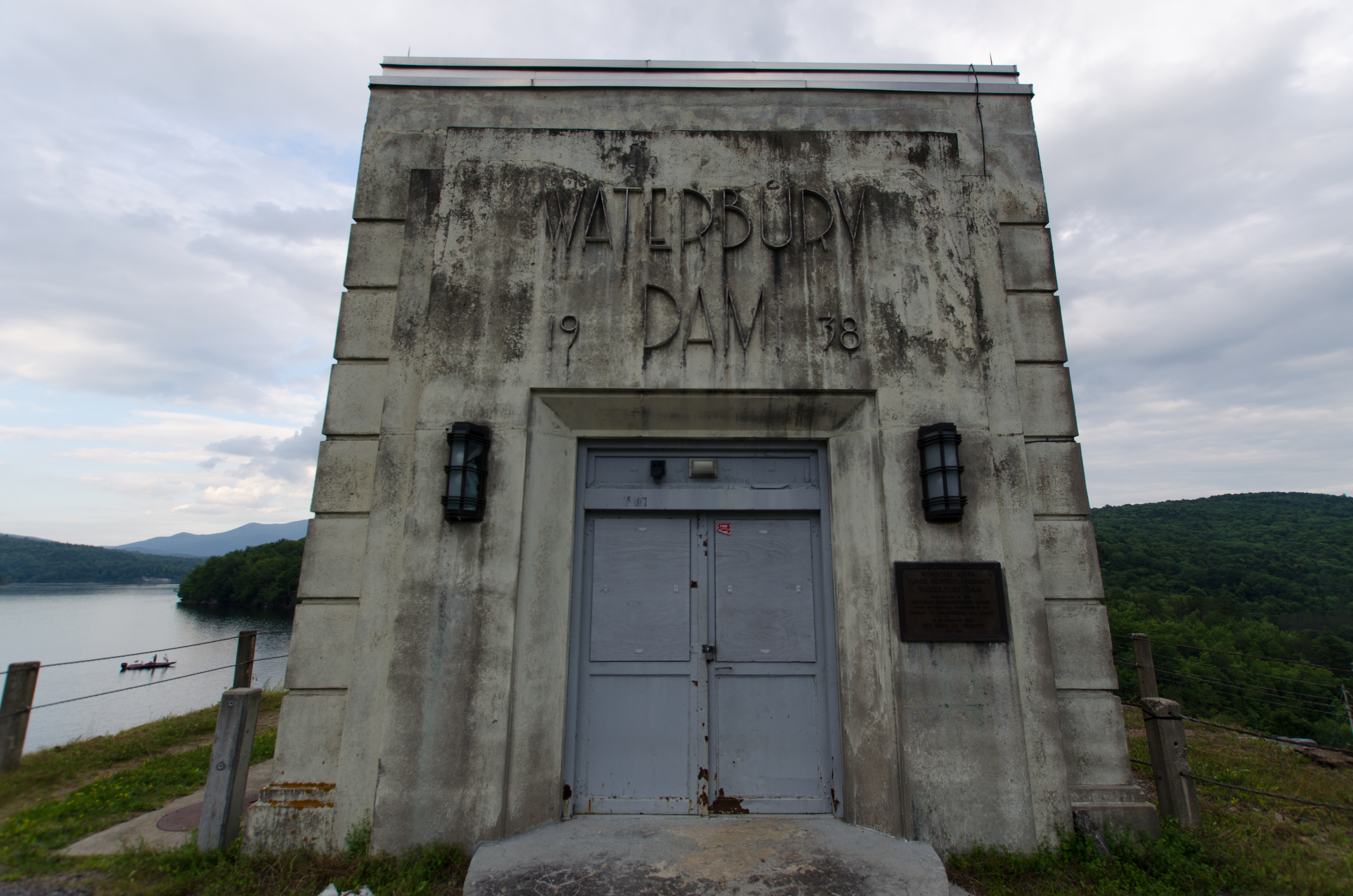
Structure on top of the Waterbury Dam, with a plaque by the door

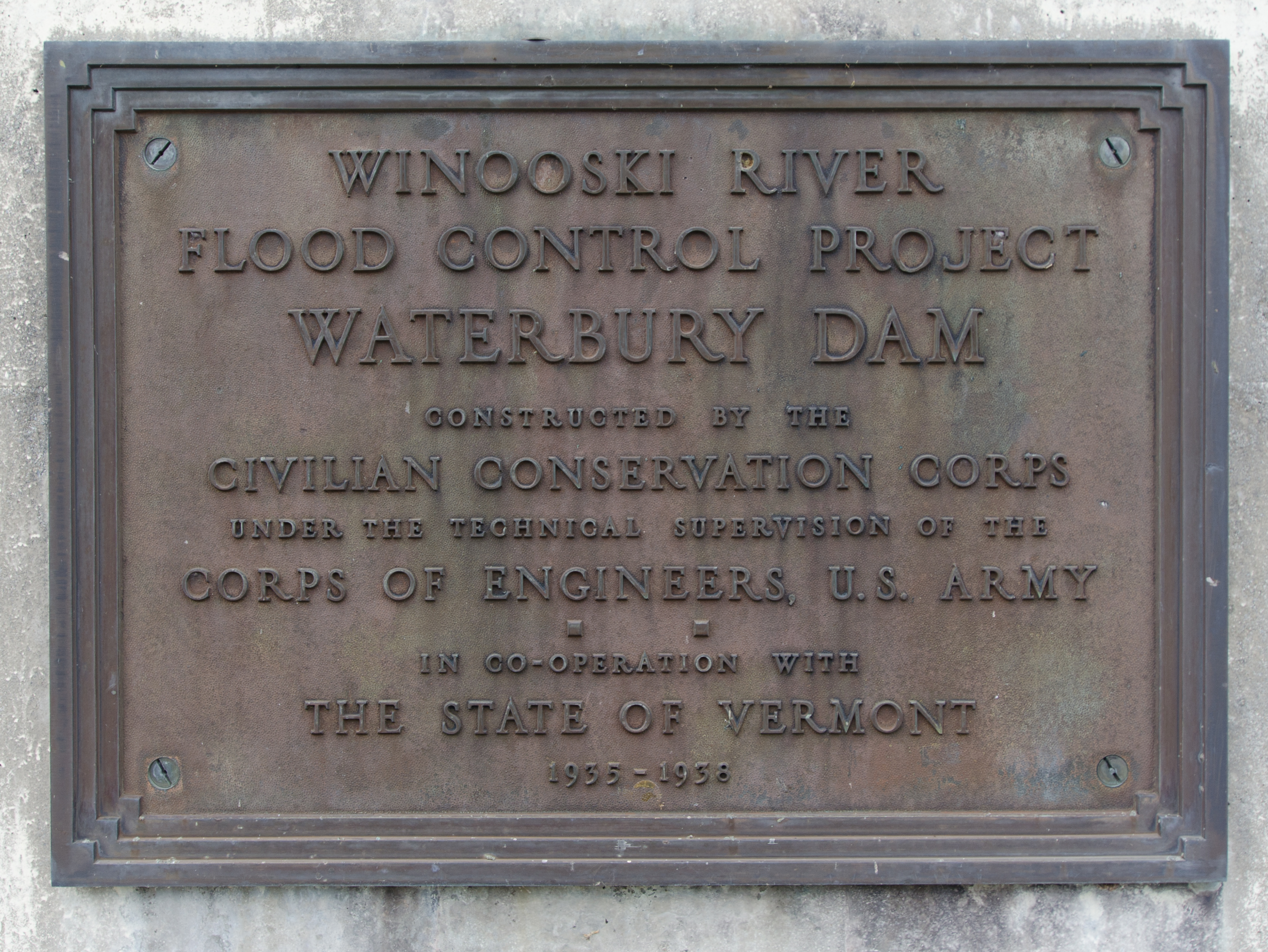
Plaque on the structure on top of the dam
