= Middlesex, Vermont =

- Town
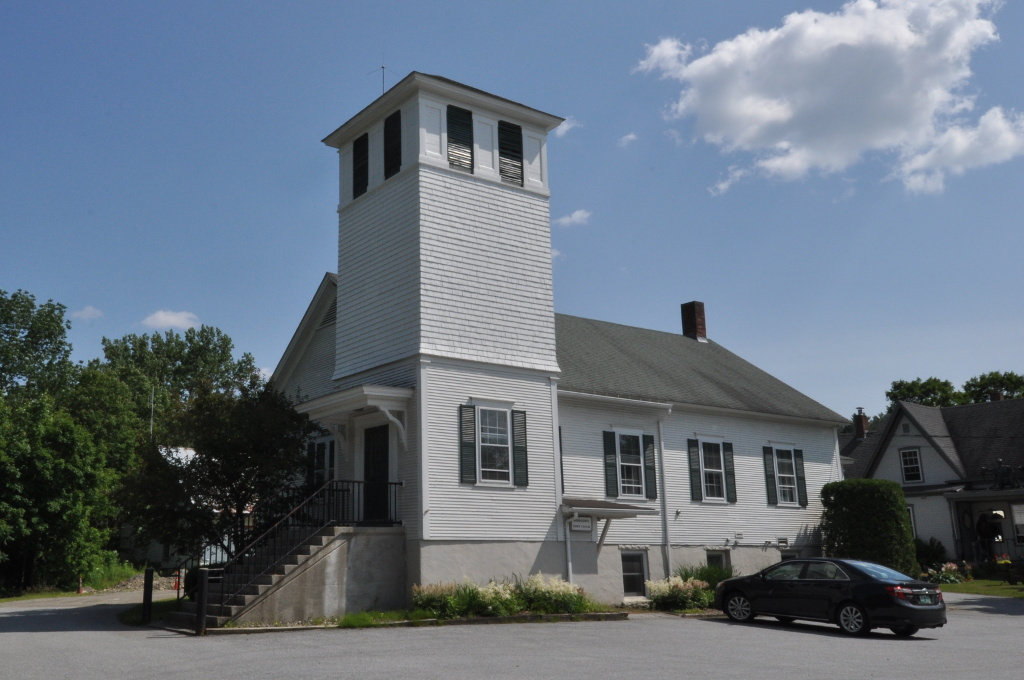
- Middlesex Town Hall in Middlesex Village

- Location in Washington County and the state of Vermont
- Coordinates: 44°20′35″N 72°37′26″W
- Country: United States
- State: Vermont
- County: Washington
- Communities: Middlesex; Middlesex Center; Putnamville; Shady Rill; Tangletown; Wrightsville

Area
  - Total: 39.8 sq mi (103.2 km^{2})
  - Land: 39.7 sq mi (102.7 km^{2})
  - Water: 0.19 sq mi (0.5 km^{2})
- Elevation: 1,037 ft (316 m)

Population (2020)
  - Total: 1,779
  - Density: 44.86/sq mi (17.32/km^{2})
- Time zone: UTC-5 (Eastern (EST))
  - Summer (DST): UTC-4 (EDT)
- ZIP Codes: 05602 (Middlesex); 05682 (Worcester)
- Area code: 802
- FIPS code: 50-44500
- GNIS feature ID: 1462147
- Website: middlesexvermont.org

Middlesex is a town in Washington County, Vermont, United States. The population was 1,779 at the 2020 census.

== Geography ==
According to the United States Census Bureau, the town has a total area of 39.9 square miles (103.2 km^{2}), of which 39.7 square miles (102.7 km^{2}) is land and 0.2 square mile (0.5 km^{2}), or 0.53%, is water.

== History ==
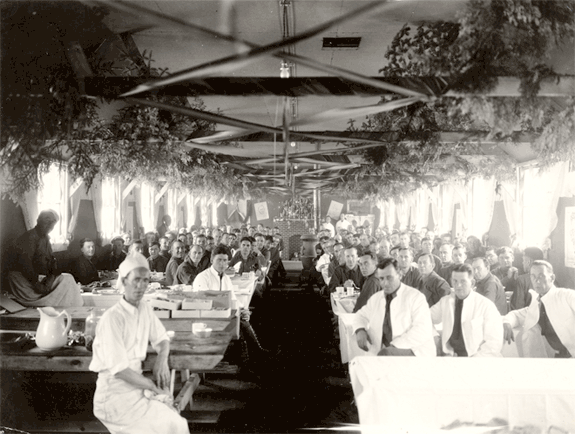
The Civilian Conservation Corps (CCC) Christmas dinner, 1933. Camp Green, a CCC camp, was located in the Wrightsville area of Middlesex. Corps members built the flood control dam there.

The town of Middlesex was granted by royal charter on June 8, 1763, by New Hampshire colonial governor Benning Wentworth. The town takes its boundaries from Waterbury, incorporated the previous day, and Worcester, which received its grant the same day as Middlesex. The source of the town's name is uncertain but it is supposed Wentworth, or a staff member, chose the name for its location between Waterbury and Worcester. Another possibility would be that Wentworth chose Middlesex to seek favor from English nobleman Charles Sackville who held the title Lord Middlesex until 1765, when he became Duke of Dorset.

The town remained largely undeveloped through the period of the Vermont Republic and early Vermont statehood, with settlements in the village and Putnamville. The Putnam family were among the first settlers of the town. Seth Putnam was elected first town clerk in 1790; brothers Isaac and Jacob Putnam were elected town surveyors.

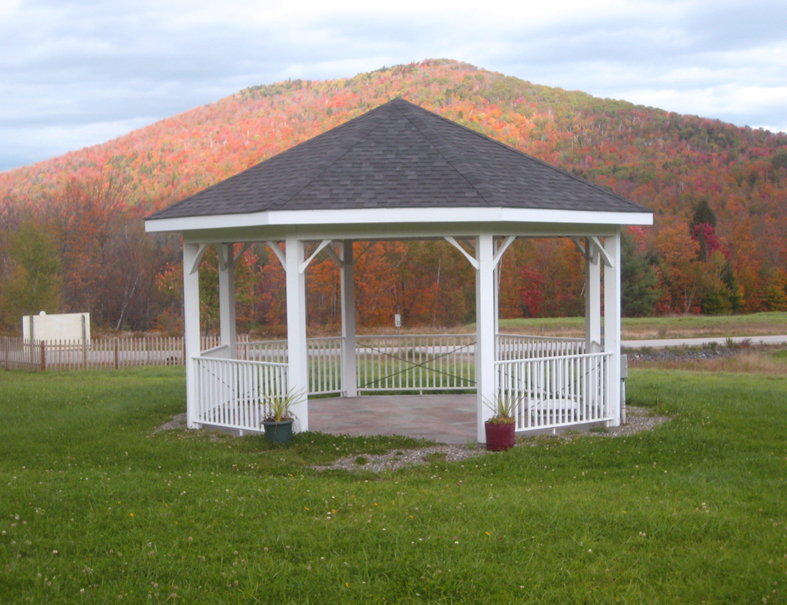
Middlesex's bandstand in front of Dumpling Hill

Middlesex village, situated along the Winooski River, is the town's chief settlement and location of the town hall. Middlesex Village obtained a post office in 1821 (that office closed in 1966). Middlesex Center is, as the name suggests, in the near center of the town situated northwest of the Great Brook and Brook Road. Shady Rill is rolling, mostly lowland where three brooks-Herrick, Martins, and Patterson, each named for a local family, converge with the North Branch which runs south to Wrightsville and Montpelier. A northern affiliation Baptist church was built in Shady Rill in 1849. The village of Putnamville is located along the town's eastern border along the North Branch River. A waterfall there once powered grist and saw mills. A post office was opened in Putnamville, incongruously titled Putnamsville, in 1882 (this post office closed in 1935).

Wrightsville, just south of Putnamville, was once a sizable settlement with nearly 30 built structures, and several mills. The Wrightsville Dam, built by the Civilian Conservation Corps 1933-35 in response to the 1927 flood, caused that settlement to be disbanded. The Northbranch Cemetery was moved southwest to Portal Road, and a majority of the mostly Greek Revival houses were moved west up the hill to where the old Hood place presently stands. Off Portal Road and Bolduc Road is Tangletown Road, which takes its name from an area of town nicknamed Tangletown because the woods there are so thick and so alike that settlers reported getting "tangled up" (lost) in the area.

The town had a large bear population well into the late nineteenth century. A recorded story tells of a farmer located between Middlesex Center and Bear Swamp finding one of his sheep killed by a bear. The farmer and his wife immediately walked their property to take stock of their flock. The farmer spotted a bear and killed it, soon afterward his wife called out that she sighted one and he shot that one, the couple returned to the barnyard and spotted a third bear-this one eating another of their sheep, and the farmer shot that bear as well. The area received the nickname Beartown.

Through most of the nineteenth century and well into the mid-twentieth century, the primary economic activity was farming. Dairy farming, sheep herding (for wool), logging, orchards and maple sugaring have all been part of the town's economy. Following the end of World War II, the town slowly transitioned to becoming a place to live for people who worked elsewhere, mostly in Montpelier.

== Demographics ==
Historical population
Census	Pop.	Note	%±
1790	60		—
1800	262		336.7%
1810	401		53.1%
1820	726		81.0%
1830	1,156		59.2%
1840	1,270		9.9%
1850	1,365		7.5%
1860	1,254		−8.1%
1870	1,171		−6.6%
1880	1,087		−7.2%
1890	889		−18.2%
1900	883		−0.7%
1910	858		−2.8%
1920	762		−11.2%
1930	751		−1.4%
1940	817		8.8%
1950	887		8.6%
1960	770		−13.2%
1970	857		11.3%
1980	1,235		44.1%
1990	1,514		22.6%
2000	1,729		14.2%
2010	1,731		0.1%
2020	1,779		2.8%
U.S. Decennial Census

As of the census of 2000, there were 1,729 people, 663 households, and 485 families residing in the town. The population density was 43.6 people per square mile (16.8/km^{2}). There were 719 housing units at an average density of 18.1 per square mile (7.0/km^{2}). The racial makeup of the town was 97.69% White, 0.35% African American, 0.58% Native American, 0.23% Asian, and 1.16% from two or more races. Hispanic or Latino of any race were 0.40% of the population.

There were 663 households, out of which 37.1% had children under the age of 18 living with them, 60.0% were couples living together and joined in either marriage or civil union, 9.0% had a female householder with no husband present, and 26.7% were non-families. 19.5% of all households were made up of individuals, and 5.3% had someone living alone who was 65 years of age or older. The average household size was 2.61 and the average family size was 2.96.

In the town, the population was spread out, with 26.5% under the age of 18, 6.4% from 18 to 24, 30.5% from 25 to 44, 29.7% from 45 to 64, and 6.8% who were 65 years of age or older. The median age was 39 years. For every 100 females, there were 95.8 males. For every 100 females age 18 and over, there were 95.7 males.

The median income for a household in the town was $51,765, and the median income for a family was $58,527. Males had a median income of $37,083 versus $30,147 for females. The per capita income for the town was $22,965. About 4.3% of families and 6.2% of the population were below the poverty line, including 8.0% of those under age 18 and none of those age 65 or over.

== Notable people ==
- H. H. Atherton, Minnesota state senator; born in Middlesex
- George W. Bailey Jr., Secretary of State of Vermont
- David Carkeet, comic novelist
- Robert M. Fisher (1928–2007), artist
- Denise R. Johnson, first woman appointed to the Vermont Supreme Court
- Patrick Leahy, Democratic US senator
- Scudder Parker, Vermont state senator and 2006 Democratic nominee for governor
- Anthony Pollina, Vermont state senator
- Edson A. Putnam, Wisconsin State Assemblyman
- Sarah Strohmeyer, author of the Bubbles Yablonsky series
