= East Barre Dam =

Dam in East Barre, Vermont

Coordinates: 44°09′20″N 72°26′36″W

East Barre Dam (National ID # VT00053) is a dam in East Barre, Washington County, Vermont.

The earthen dam was constructed between 1933 and 1935 under the supervision of the North Atlantic Division of the United States Army Corps of Engineers, with a height of 65 feet and a length of 1460 feet at its crest. The dam is a seasonal flood control structure to impound the Jail Branch River, a tributary of the Winooski River. Construction was done almost entirely with hand labor by the Civilian Conservation Corps.

The Corps of Engineers designed the dam in response to a 1927 flood, which set state records and hit the Winooski River Valley and its tributaries the hardest. Eighty-four people died as a result of the flood statewide, and the downtown of Barre, Vermont, was decimated. Today, the dam protects the city from flooding almost yearly, as the area above the dam floods semi-yearly, but the controlled flow of water into Barre cuts back considerably on the amount of flood damage.

The dam is owned and operated by the state of Vermont. Although the dammed area has a maximum capacity of 23,550 acre-feet, it is normally empty.
