= Tangletown, Vermont =

Unincorporated community in Vermont, U.S.

Coordinates: 44.328°N 72.600°W

Tangletown (also Tangle Town) is an unincorporated community in the town of Middlesex in Washington County, Vermont, United States, in the central part of the state.

The area is loosely defined, located off Bolduc Road to the east, Alice Dobey Road and Dolan Road along the north, and Molly Supple Hill Road on the west. The place name originates from a time in the 19th century when the area was undeveloped and hunters would become confused by the tight vegetation and repeated similar topography of rock outcrops, hills, and similar vegetation, causing them to become "tangled up" (lost) in the landscape.

The area, though still sparsely settled, has a named east-to-west road called Tangle Town Road.
