= National Weather Service Burlington, Vermont =

NWS Forecast Office serving northern Vermont, northern New York

- Location: South Burlington
- Country: United States
- Coordinates: 44°28′09″N 73°09′17″W
- Website: www.weather.gov/btv/

The National Weather Service Burlington, Vermont is a local office of the National Weather Service located at Burlington International Airport (BTV) in South Burlington, VT that is responsible for monitoring weather conditions in extreme northern New York State and the northern two-thirds of Vermont.

== History ==
A chemistry and natural history professor, Mr. Zadock Thompson, began weather observation in the Burlington in 1829 on the campus of the University of Vermont. Records of from the first year have been lost and only a summary exists for those of 1830 and 1831. Detailed observations, but not continuous, are only available since beginning in January 1832. Mr. Thompson became affiliated with the Smithsonian Institution’s volunteer observer program in August 1853 and was replaced after his death in 1856 by another professor until 1864. On May 24, 1871, the U.S. Army Signal Service established a weather bureau in Downtown Burlington. In 1890, the U. S. Weather Bureau was established. The Burlington Office was officially established on March 29, 1906, at 601 Main Street in a building of its own.

Burlington Municipal Airport opened a weather station on February 4, 1934, but all reports were sent from the City Office. On March 1, 1939, the first telegraph reports directly from the airport location began. On June 4, 1943, the U.S. Weather Bureau consolidated the two observing sites at the airport location, closing the City Office. The Weather Bureau moved to the new building on February 15, 1950, some 0.3 miles north from the previous location. The office and instruments remained in this location until July 19, 1973, when it moved to its present location in the Burlington International Airport. The NEXRAD radar is northeast of Winooski, Vermont (44.5109941°N 73.166424°W).
