= District No. 1 Schoolhouse =

District No. 1 Schoolhouse may refer to:

- District No. 1 Schoolhouse (Fryeburg, Maine), listed on the National Register of Historic Places in Oxford County, Maine
- District No. 1 Schoolhouse (Somerset, Vermont), listed on the National Register of Historic Places in Windham County, Vermont
