= Crows Nest =

Crows Nest, Crow's Nest or Crowsnest may refer to:

- Crow's nest, a structure in the upper part of the main mast of a ship, or a structure that is used as a lookout point

== Places ==
In Australia

- Crows Nest, New South Wales, a suburb in Sydney
  - Crows Nest railway station
- Crows Nest, Queensland, a town in the Toowoomba Region
  - Crows Nest National Park
  - Shire of Crows Nest
  - Electoral district of Crows Nest

In Canada

- Crow's Nest, Nova Scotia
- Crowsnest Highway, in British Columbia and Alberta
- Crowsnest Pass, a mountain pass on the Alberta–British Columbia border
  - Crowsnest Mountain
  - Crowsnest Provincial Park
- Crowsnest River, Alberta

In Hong Kong

- Crow's Nest (Hong Kong), a hill

In the United Kingdom

- Crow's Nest, Cornwall, England

In the United States

- Crows Nest, Indiana
- Crow's Nest, Montana, near the Battle of the Little Bighorn in 1876
- Crow's Nest (New York), a mountain
- Crows Nest (Wilmington, Vermont), an historic property
- Crow's Nest Natural Area Preserve, in Stafford County, Virginia
- Crows Nest Point, a cape in Virginia

== Other uses ==
- The Crow's Nest (film), a 1922 American silent film
- The Crow's Nest (University of South Florida St. Petersburg), a student newspaper
- Crowsnest, an airborne early warning pod for the Merlin helicopter
