= Homestead–Horton Neighborhood Historic District =

Historic district in Vermont, United States

- Homestead–Horton Neighborhood
- U.S. National Register of Historic Places
- U.S. Historic district
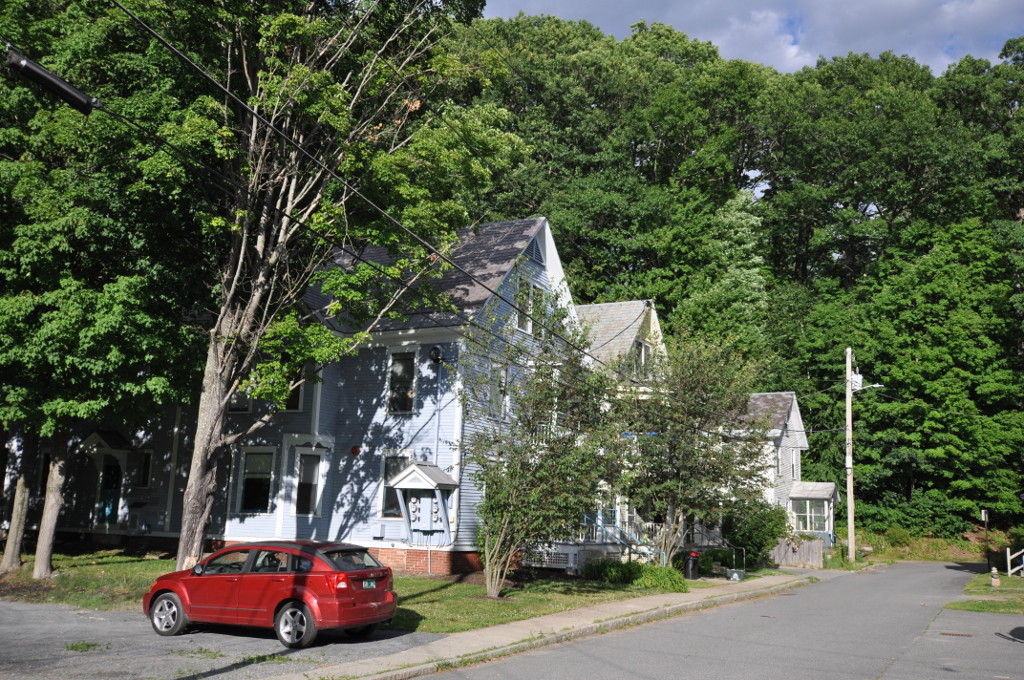

- Location within Vermont
- Location: Horton and Homestead Places, Brattleboro, Vermont
- Coordinates: 42°50′49″N 72°33′42″W
- Area: 4.5 acres (1.8 ha)
- Built: 1840
- NRHP reference No.: 09000160
- Added to NRHP: April 3, 2009

The Homestead–Horton Neighborhood Historic District encompasses a small turn-of-the-20th century neighborhood area in Brattleboro, Vermont. Located on a portion of Canal Street and all of Horton and Homestead Places, the district includes a significant number of Queen Anne Victorians, as well as the Italianate home of Jacob Estey, proprietor of the Estey Organ Company, one of the city's larger employers. The district was listed on the National Register of Historic Places in 2009.

== Description and history ==
The Homestead–Horton neighborhood is located southwest of downtown Brattleboro, on the southeast side of Canal Street, a major thoroughfare connecting the downtown area to Interstate 91. It includes all of the buildings on the south side of Canal Street, between Washington Street and Frost Place, and all of the buildings on Homestead and Horton Places, two dead-end streets extending southeast from Canal Street (but connected via an unnamed loop drive at their far ends). The area is physically separated from the nearly-adjacent Canal Street Schoolhouse and Canal Street-Clark Street Neighborhood Historic District by a steep slope, and is two blocks from the former Estey Organ Company factory. The district has 21 historically significant houses, most of them two-story wood frame residential structures, housing one or more units. Many of the larger, formerly single-family, houses have been converted into multi-unit housing. Most were built between about 1890 and 1915, and there has been little loss or major alteration to these houses since then. A few earlier houses survive, including a few Greek Revival structures, and the relatively modest early Italianate house of Jacob Estey, built on Canal Street in the 1850s.

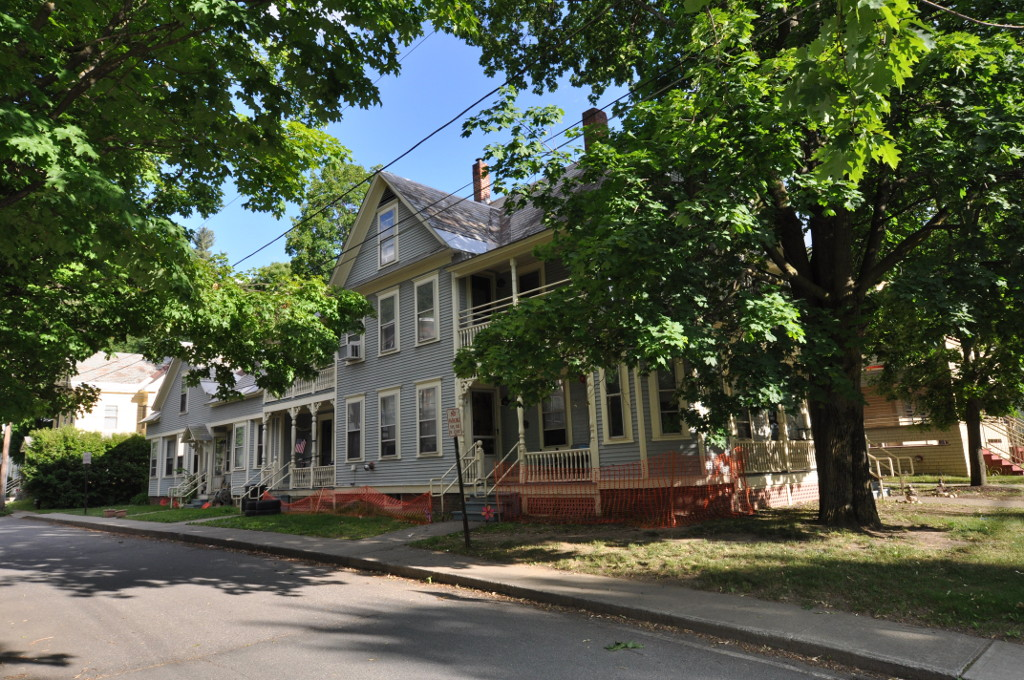

Brattleboro experienced significant industrial growth in the late 19th century, which increased demand for housing at its various factories and mills. Prior to this time, this stretch of Canal Street had two estates on it: that of Jacob Estey, owner of the Estey Organ Company, and H.B. Horton, whose son Andrew was a superintendent of the local gas works. Jacob Estey died in 1890, and Brattleboro's streetcar line was run down Canal Street in 1895, increasing development pressure in the area. The two estates were subdivided, and Horton and Homestead Places laid out to build new housing on them. Between 1895 and 1915, fifteen new Queen Anne style buildings were constructed in the area, including ten quite large multi-unit apartment houses. Since the 1990s, the Windham Land Trust, a local preservation organization, has rehabilitated many of these properties.

== See also ==
- National Register of Historic Places listings in Windham County, Vermont
