= West Brattleboro Green Historic District =

Historic district in Vermont, United States

- U.S. National Register of Historic Places
- U.S. Historic district
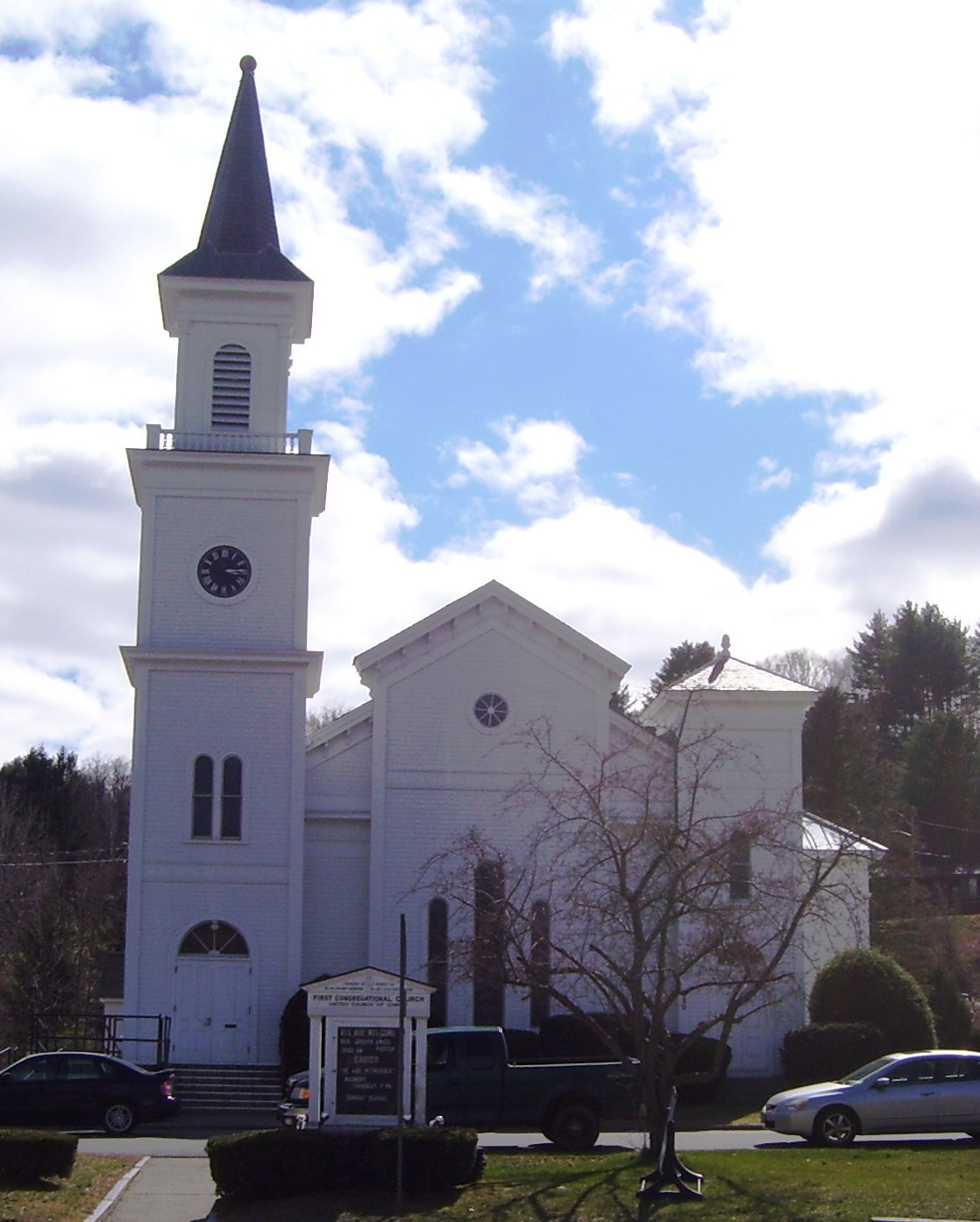
- First Congregational Church, West Brattleboro

- Location within Vermont Location within the United States
- Location: 870–950 Western Ave., 19–35 South St., and town common., Brattleboro, Vermont
- Coordinates: 42°51′9″N 72°36′0″W
- Area: 10 acres (4.0 ha)
- Built: 1785
- Architectural style: Greek Revival, Italianate, et al.
- NRHP reference No.: 02000675
- Added to NRHP: June 24, 2002

The West Brattleboro Green Historic Districts encompasses the historic core of the village of West Brattleboro, Vermont. Centered in the triangular green at South Street and Western Avenue, it includes a modest collection of buildings constructed between about 1800 and 1910. It was listed on the National Register of Historic Places in 2002.

== Description and history ==
The village of West Brattleboro is located about 2 miles (3.2 km) west of downtown Brattleboro, roughly centered on the junction of Western Avenue (Vermont Route 9), Bonnyvale Road, and South Street. Western Avenue is the major east–west route across southern Vermont, while Bonnyvale Road and South Street provide through access to the rural southern and western parts of the town. Western Avenue runs roughly parallel and south of Whetstone Brook, and is the road along which most of the village is located. The junction with South Street creates a triangular island, which is where the village common is located. The historic district consists of the buildings that face the common, from Bonnyvale Road south on Western Avenue to George F. Miller Drive, and to a point just south of the common on South Street.

West Brattleboro was the site of the town's second church (built in 1785), and the area soon grew to become a wayside stop for travelers heading east or west. In 1818 the roads were realigned, creating the triangular common, and the church was moved to the site of the present First Congregational Church. That church built in 1845, with Italianate styling added in the 1880s, is the most substantial and prominent building in the village. Although there are a few older buildings, most of them date to the time period 1840–1910, and are wood-frame buildings that have architectural styling popular in the mid-to-late 19th century. The other most prominent buildings are a 3 1/2-story former hotel, and a two-story commercial block, both on the north side of Western Avenue.

== See also ==
- National Register of Historic Places listings in Windham County, Vermont
