= Round Schoolhouse =

- U.S. National Register of Historic Places
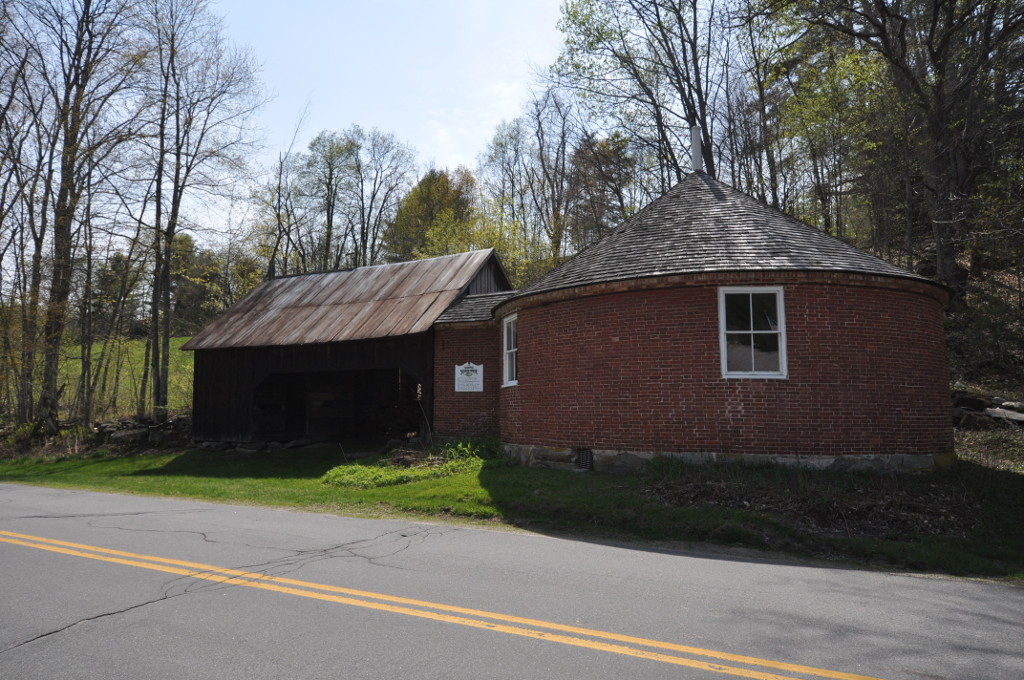

- Location within Vermont Location within the United States
- Location: Grassy Brook Rd., Brookline, Vermont
- Coordinates: 43°1′17″N 72°36′17″W
- Area: 0.3 acres (0.12 ha)
- Built: 1822
- Built by: Wilson, John "Thunderbolt"
- NRHP reference No.: 77000104
- Added to NRHP: November 23, 1977

The Round Schoolhouse is a historic school building on Grassy Brook Road in Brookline, Vermont. Built in 1822, it is the oldest brick schoolhouse in Windham County, and further distinctive for its round shape. From 1929 to 1989 it served as Brookline's town hall. It was listed on the National Register of Historic Places in 1977.

== Description and history ==
The Round School House is located on the west side of Grassy Brook Road, south of the center of Brookline, and just south of the road's crossing of Grassy Brook. It is a single story circular brick structure, with a shallow-pitch conical roof. A gabled vestibule projects to the south, providing the only entrance to the building, and there are five windows in its walls. The roof is held together by an iron hoop, with rafters leading from the wall to a king post at the center. The post rises through the center of the roof, providing a finial on the exterior. The interior of the school is a single chamber, which originally had benches arranged to face the teacher's desk, which was located near the door. The interior dates to 1910, with tongue-and-groove flooring and wainscoting.

The schoolhouse was built in 1822, replacing an earlier wood frame structure that stood nearby. The school was built by John "Thunderbolt" Wilson, a Scottish immigrant who is said to have been a highwayman in his native country, but established a practice as a doctor and teacher, serving Brookline and Newfane. The building was used as a schoolhouse until 1929, when a new school was built that conformed to state standards. The building was then used as Brookline's town hall until 1989.

A plaque on the exterior of the schoolhouse, as of August 17, 2020, reads as follows: "Designed -1821- By Dr. John “Thunderbolt” Wilson. Built in 1822 on this site deeded to the Town of Brookline by Peter Benson, for the sum of $5.00. Dr. Wilson, a former Scottish highwayman, taught the first term of 60 pupils who sat on benches. The interior was completely renovated in 1910 and on March 5, 1929 the building was turned over to the Town of Brookline for use as the town hall. This building is thought to be the only round school-house ever constructed in this country."

== See also ==
- National Register of Historic Places listings in Windham County, Vermont

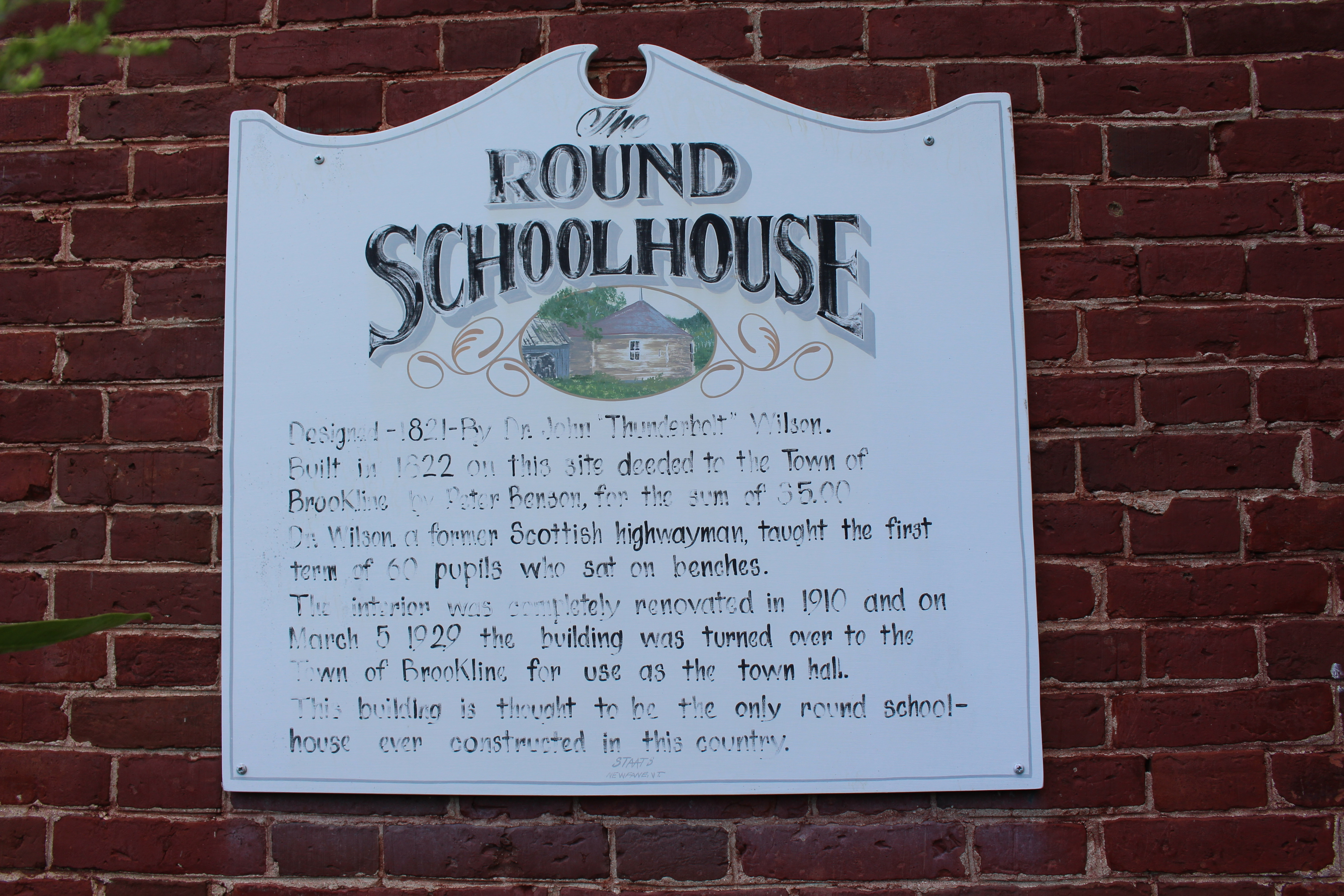
Photo of Plaque on exterior of building
