= First Congregational Church and Meetinghouse =

Historic church in Vermont, United States

- U.S. National Register of Historic Places
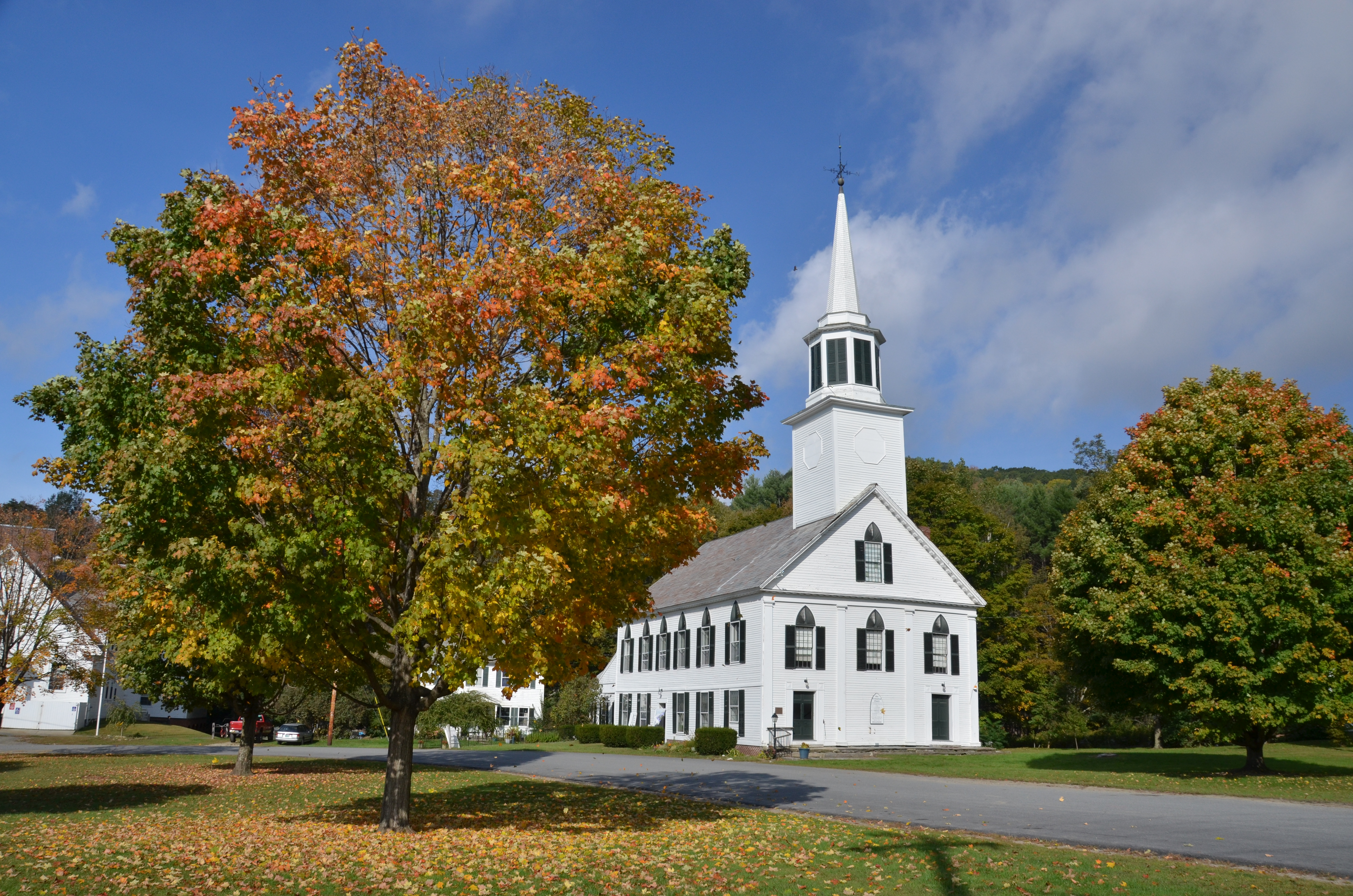

- Location within Vermont Location within the United States
- Location: Near jct. of VT 30 and VT 35, Townshend, Vermont
- Coordinates: 43°2′49″N 72°40′10″W
- Area: less than one acre
- Built: 1790
- Architectural style: Gothic Revival, Greek Revival
- MPS: Religious Buildings, Sites and Structures in Vermont MPS
- NRHP reference No.: 02001344
- Added to NRHP: November 15, 2002

The First Congregational Church and Meetinghouse, also known as the Church of Christ and the Townshend Church, is a historic church at 34 Common Road in Townshend, Vermont. Built in 1790 and restyled in 1840, it is one of the oldest church buildings in continuous use in the state. The building was listed on the National Register of Historic Places in 2002; the congregation was established in 1777, and is affiliated with the United Church of Christ.

== Description and history ==
The First Congregational Church and Meetinghouse is located in the village center of Townshend, on the north side of the common, near the junction of Vermont Routes 30 and 35. It is a two-story wood frame structure, with a gable roof, clapboard siding, and a brick foundation that is partially set on ledge. Its front (east-facing) facade is symmetrical, with three bays articulated by pilasters, supporting a full pediment with a modillioned rake edge. The outer bays have entrances at the ground floor. The second-floor bays are filled with sash windows, each with a lancet-shaped louver above. This detail is repeated in a window in the center of the gable, and in windows on the second floor side elevations. A two-stage tower rises above the facade, with a square first stage, and an octagonal belfry stage above, capped by an octagonal steeple.

The church was built in 1790 (although it is not described as completely finished until 1795) as a five bay meetinghouse with the main entrance set on the long side that faces the common (which is used today as a secondary entrance). At that time, the hall had a narrow gallery on the second level. In about 1840 a sixth bay was added, with the tower, and the entrance was reoriented to the eastern facade. At that time the building's Greek and Gothic Revival characteristics were also added. The church congregation was founded in 1777, and this building was used to house town offices until 1908.

== See also ==
- National Register of Historic Places listings in Windham County, Vermont
