= Arthur D. and Emma J. Wyatt House =

Historic house in Vermont, United States

- U.S. National Register of Historic Places
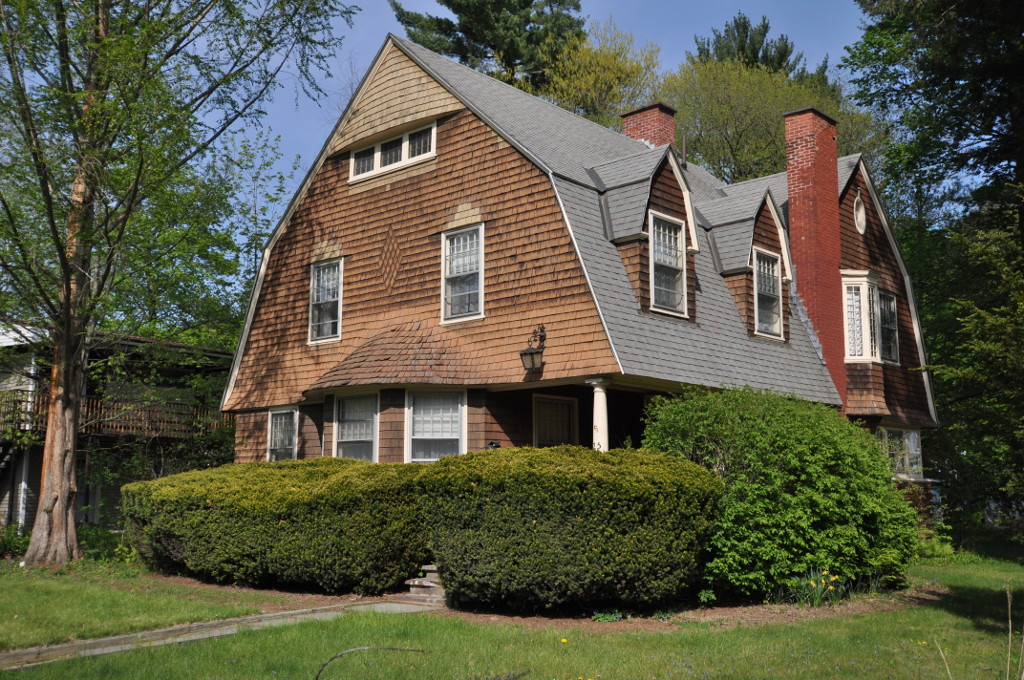

- Location within Vermont Location within the United States
- Location: 125 Putney Rd., Brattleboro, Vermont
- Coordinates: 42°51′32″N 72°33′30″W
- Area: 0.2 acres (0.081 ha)
- Built: 1894
- Architect: Crosby, Francis W.; Wyatt, Arthur D.
- Architectural style: Shingle Style
- NRHP reference No.: 05000420
- Added to NRHP: May 10, 2005

The Arthur D. and Emma J. Wyatt House is a historic house at 125 Putney Road (United States Route 5) in Brattleboro, Vermont. Built in 1894, it is one of the state's finest examples of a mature Shingle style residence. It was listed on the National Register of Historic Places in 2005.

== Description and history ==
The Wyatt House is located north of downtown Brattleboro, on the east side of US 5, between North Street and Bradley Avenue. It is a 2 1/2-story rectangular wood-frame structure, oriented with its main facade to the south. Its roof is defined by large gambrel gables at the sides, with gambrel dormers and a larger gambrel projection on the main facade. The roof extends over a recessed porch on the south side, and there is a rounded single-story projecting bay on the street-facing west side, whose roof is a continuation of the shingles that side the exterior.

The house was built in 1893–94, a boom period of growth in the city, and has been relatively little-altered since. It was designed as a collaboration between Arthur Wyatt, a photographer, and Francis Cabot, a Boston-based architect who was from Brattleboro, and was at the time the northernmost house on Brattleboro's Main Street. It is distinguished from other Shingle style houses in the state for its general lack of Queen Anne and Stick style elements, which are more often found. The house is accompanied by a complete set of original design drawings.

== See also ==
- National Register of Historic Places listings in Windham County, Vermont
