= Samuel Gilbert Smith Farmstead =

- U.S. National Register of Historic Places
- U.S. Historic district
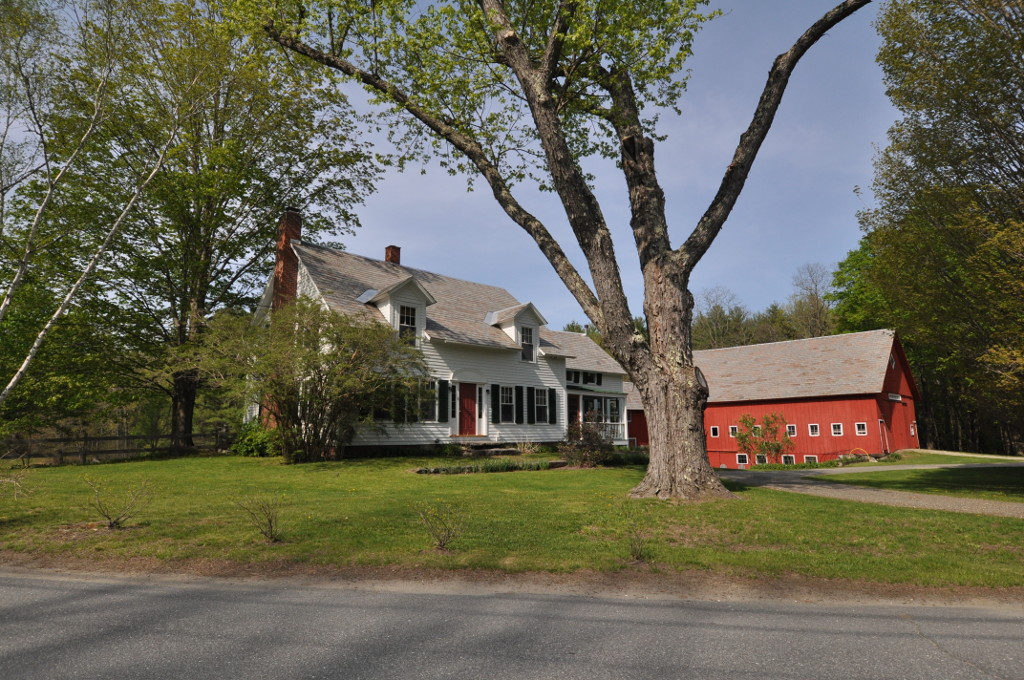

- Location within Vermont Location within the United States
- Location: 375 Orchard St., Brattleboro, Vermont
- Coordinates: 42°51′38″N 72°35′19″W
- Area: 20 acres (8.1 ha)
- Built: 1870
- MPS: Agricultural Resources of Vermont MPS
- NRHP reference No.: 00000830
- Added to NRHP: July 20, 2000

The Samuel Gilbert Smith Farmstead is a historic farm property at 375 Orchard Street in Brattleboro, Vermont. The present 20-acre (8.1 ha) property includes a well-preserved 1870s-era connected farmstead and other 19th-century landscape features. Associated with the property are a well-documented history of the transformations the property has undergone since its 18th-century origins. The property was listed on the National Register of Historic Places in 2000.

== Description and history ==
The Samuel Gilbert Smith Farmstead is located in a rural area of northern Brattleboro, on the east side of Orchard Street. The property now consists of 20 acres (8.1 ha), although the farm originally associated with the property was 1,000 acres (400 ha) in the 18th century. The farmstead sits on land that has open fields lined with stone walls, original 19th-century wells, and a partially lined streambed that passes through the property. The farmstead has a main house block, to which are connected a kitchen ell, equipment shed, and barn. All of these elements date to about 1870, and have vernacular style. The house is 1-1/2 stories in height, with a side gable roof and a pair of gabled wall dormers.

The farm's origins date to 1767, when Dr. Henry Wells was granted 1000 acres on what was then known as Meeting House Hill. His acreage provided some of the earliest civic parcels in Brattleboro, including its first cemetery, town common, and meeting house site. The town's economic development, however, took place along its streams and rivers, and the area soon declined in importance. From 1801 to 1815, the farm (then about 150 acres (61 ha)) was owned by Royall Tyler, an early American playwright and Vermont jurist, who left a detailed description of the property from that time, when it had an older detached farm complex. In 1850 half of the farm passed to Samuel Gilbert Smith, who c. 1870 tore down the old farmstead and built the present connected one.

== See also ==
- National Register of Historic Places listings in Windham County, Vermont
