= Guilford Center Meeting House =

Historic church in Vermont, United States

- U.S. National Register of Historic Places
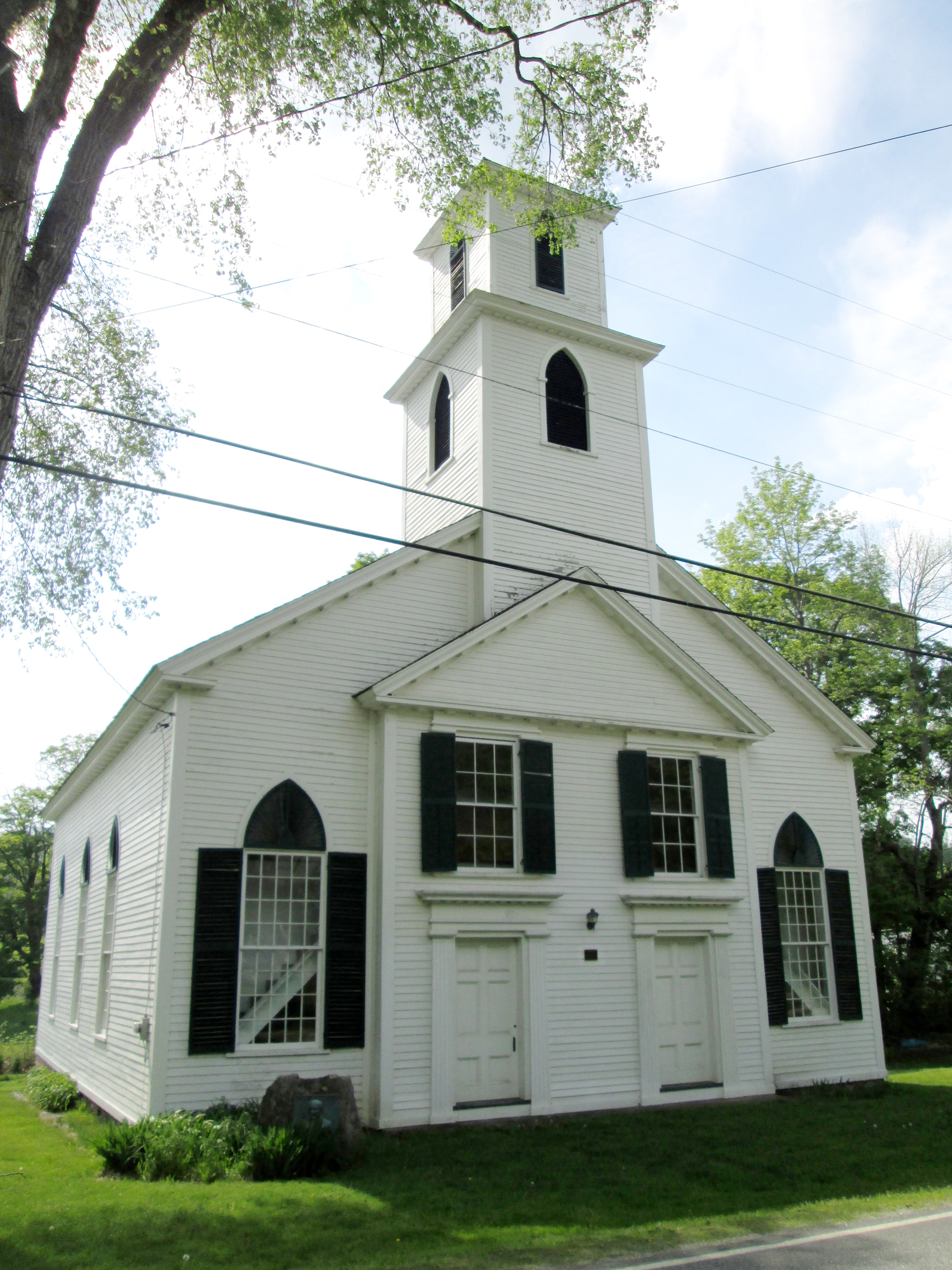
- (2016)

- Location within Vermont Location within the United States
- Location: 4042 Guilford Center Rd., Guilford, Vermont
- Coordinates: 42°47′31″N 72°37′32″W
- Area: 0.6 acres (0.24 ha)
- Built: 1837
- Architectural style: Greek Revival
- NRHP reference No.: 82001708
- Added to NRHP: May 13, 1982

The Guilford Center Meeting House, formerly the Guilford Center Universalist Church, is a historic building on Guilford Center Road in Guilford, Vermont. Built in 1837, it is a well-preserved example of transitional Greek Revival architecture. The building was added to the National Register of Historic Places in 1982. It is now owned by the local historical society as a community meeting and event space.

== Description and history ==
The Guilford Center Meeting House is located on the west side of Guilford Center Road, just south of Carpenter Hill Road and the Guilford Free Library in the central part of the rural community. It is a single-story wood frame structure, with a front-facing gable roof and clapboard siding. Its front facade has a slightly projecting gabled entry, flanked by sash windows topped by lancet-arched louvers. The entry section has paired entrances, each flanked by pilasters and topped by a corniced entablature, with sash windows above, and with a fully pedimented gable. A two-stage square tower rises above the entrance, with lancet-arched louvered openings high on the first stage, and on the second, belfry stage. The stages are demarcated by crenellated parapets. The interior of the church is relatively simple, with semi-boxed pews arranged in three groups, and the pulpit at the far end of the sanctuary. There is a loft area above the entrance vestibule.

The church was built in 1837, using materials salvaged from an earlier meetinghouse. It was erected by a Universalist congregation at a cost of $2409, and represents one of the state's earliest examples of Gothic religious architecture. Attendance at the church was always somewhat intermittent, and the congregation's size generally followed a downward trend in the town's population. In 1977 the small congregation gave the building to the local historical society. It now maintains the building, and opens it to the community as a social and performance venue.

== See also ==
- National Register of Historic Places listings in Windham County, Vermont
