= Canal Street–Clark Street Neighborhood Historic District =

Historic district in Vermont, United States

- U.S. National Register of Historic Places
- U.S. Historic district
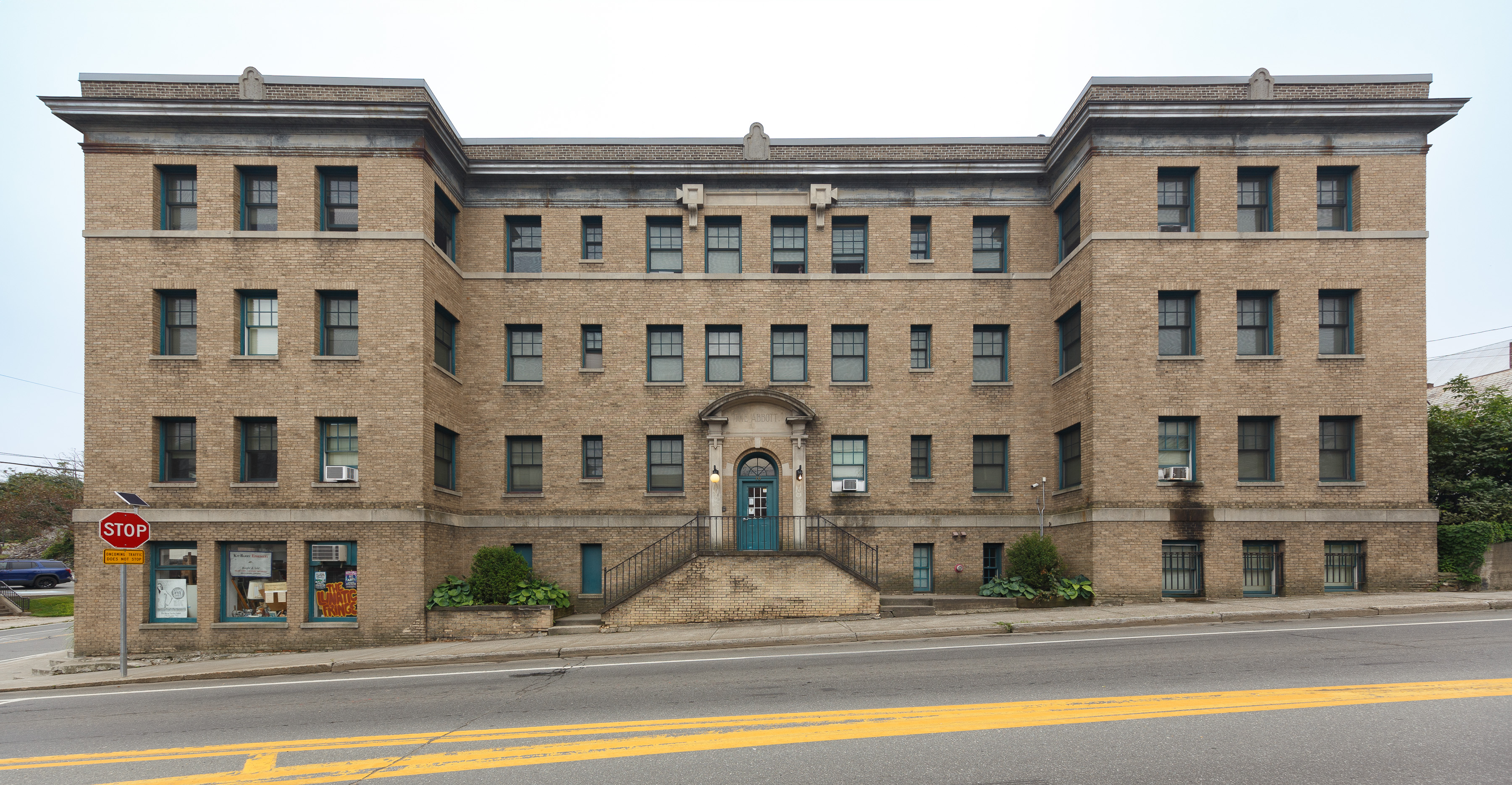
- The Abbott

- Location within Vermont Location within the United States
- Location: Roughly bounded by Canal, S. Main, Lawrence and Clark Sts., Brattleboro, Vermont
- Coordinates: 42°50′56″N 72°33′35″W
- Area: 13.2 acres (5.3 ha)
- Architectural style: Greek Revival, Queen Anne, Gothic Revival
- NRHP reference No.: 93000593
- Added to NRHP: July 8, 1993

The Canal Street–Clark Street Neighborhood Historic District encompasses a compact 19th-century working-class neighborhood of Brattleboro, Vermont. Most of its buildings are modest vernacular wood-frame buildings, erected between 1830 and 1935; there are a few apartment blocks, and one church. The district was listed on the National Register of Historic Places in 1993.

== Description and history ==
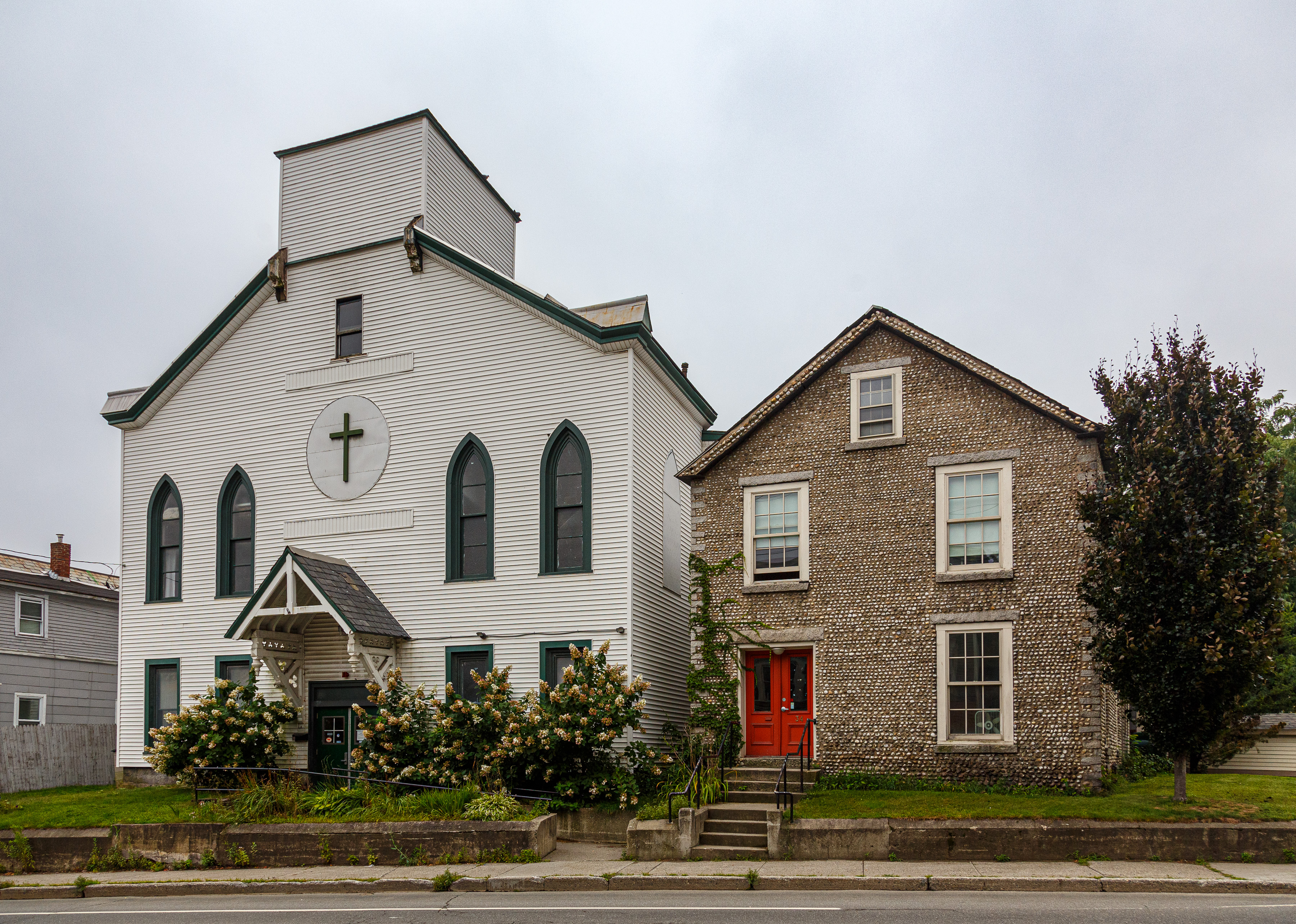
First Universalist Church and Winslow Ward House

The Canal Street–Clark Street area is located southwest of Brattleboro's downtown on the south side of Canal Street (United States Route 5). The area is effectively bounded by Canal Street to the north, South Main Street to the east, and the slopes of Prospect Hill to the south. A small network of streets in this area, including Clark Street, Lawrence Street, and Estabrook Road, make up the neighborhood. Most of the housing in this area is wood-frame construction, in vernacular renditions of styles popular at the time of their construction, although there are three masonry (brick or stone) buildings. There are only a few houses with elaborate decorative elements, and there are also only a small number of purpose-built multiunit buildings. The district's only non-residential building is the 1850-51 Greek Revival First Universalist Church on Canal Street.

Brattleboro's center area was first settled in the 18th century, but saw significant growth beginning in the 1820s, with the advent first of river-based transport (on the Connecticut River), and then the railroad, which arrived in 1849. Canal Street was laid out sometime before 1845, paralleling the canal along Whetstone Brook that provided power to the town's industries. Some of the district's oldest houses were built along the south side of Canal Street. Clark Street, which mostly parallels Canal Street, was laid out 1845–52, and was named for Joseph Clark, the early landowner of the area. It was built to provide access to the rear of the long and narrow lots on which the early houses were built, for the purpose of subdivision. Lawrence and Estabrook Streets were also built around that time. By the late 19th century the area had been mostly built out, and a period of redevelopment saw the construction of multiunit housing, mainly along the principal roads. The Abbott, at Canal and South Main, was built in 1911; it is a large multiunit brick apartment block with commercial spaces on the ground floor.

== See also ==
- National Register of Historic Places listings in Windham County, Vermont
