= Moore and Thompson Paper Mill Complex =

- U.S. National Register of Historic Places
- U.S. Historic district
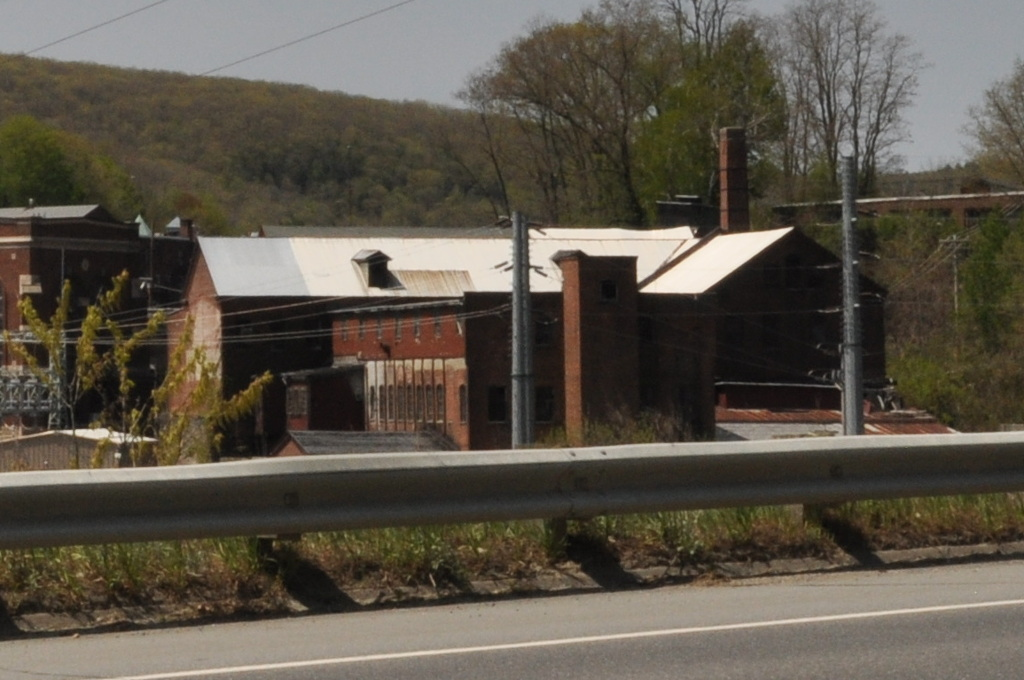

- Location within Vermont Location within the United States
- Location: Bridge St., Bellows Falls, Vermont
- Coordinates: 43°8′1″N 72°26′33″W
- Area: 2 acres (0.81 ha)
- Built: 1880
- MPS: Bellows Falls Island MRA (AD)
- NRHP reference No.: 84003475
- Added to NRHP: March 16, 1984

The Moore and Thompson Paper Mill Complex is a major late 19th-century industrial site off Bridge Street in Bellows Falls, Vermont. It is the largest surviving mill complex from the village's industrial heyday, and is one of the largest of the period in the state. It was listed on the National Register of Historic Places in 1984.

== Description and history ==
The Moore and Thompson Paper Mill Complex is located at the southern end of the Island of Bellows Falls, created by the Connecticut River to the east and the Bellows Falls Power Canal to the west. It consists of two large clusters of buildings, one immediately east of the power station at the dam located at the southern end of the canal, and the other between that and Bridge Street to the north. The lower complex, built primarily in the 1880s, consists of multi-story brick structures formed into a roughly rectangular shape. These are connected via a bridge to a similarly sized group of single-story buildings, erected in 1924-25. The bridge crosses a former canal and railroad right-of-way, and historically carried utilities.

Albert C. Moore started in the papermaking business in Bartonsville, northwest of Bellows Falls. When his mill was destroyed by a flood in 1869, he entered the paper business of William Russell in Bellows Falls. In partnership with Edward Arms, Moore built the lower complex of buildings in 1880-81. Financing of this endeavor apparently prompted the partners to take on Horace W. Thompson as a third owner. Arms withdrew from the business in 1892, and Moore and Thompson was formally incorporated in 1893. In 1914 the company leased its water rights (to divert water from the canal for power) to the Bellows Falls Electric Company, in exchange for electricity delivered by its hydroelectric plant; this agreement was in 1984 still in force. The partners withdrew from the business in the early 1920s, and it is their successor, the Hudson Bag Company, that built the upper complex.

Moore and Thompson was not the largest papermaking operation in Bellows Falls. The largest, established by a predecessor to International Paper, was located northeast of its facility, and most of it was torn in the late 1920s, after it was closed following a major strike in 1921. Hudson Bag remained in business (as the area's largest papermaker) at the Moore and Thompson complex until 1963.

== See also ==
- National Register of Historic Places listings in Windham County, Vermont
