= Tontine Building =

- U.S. National Register of Historic Places
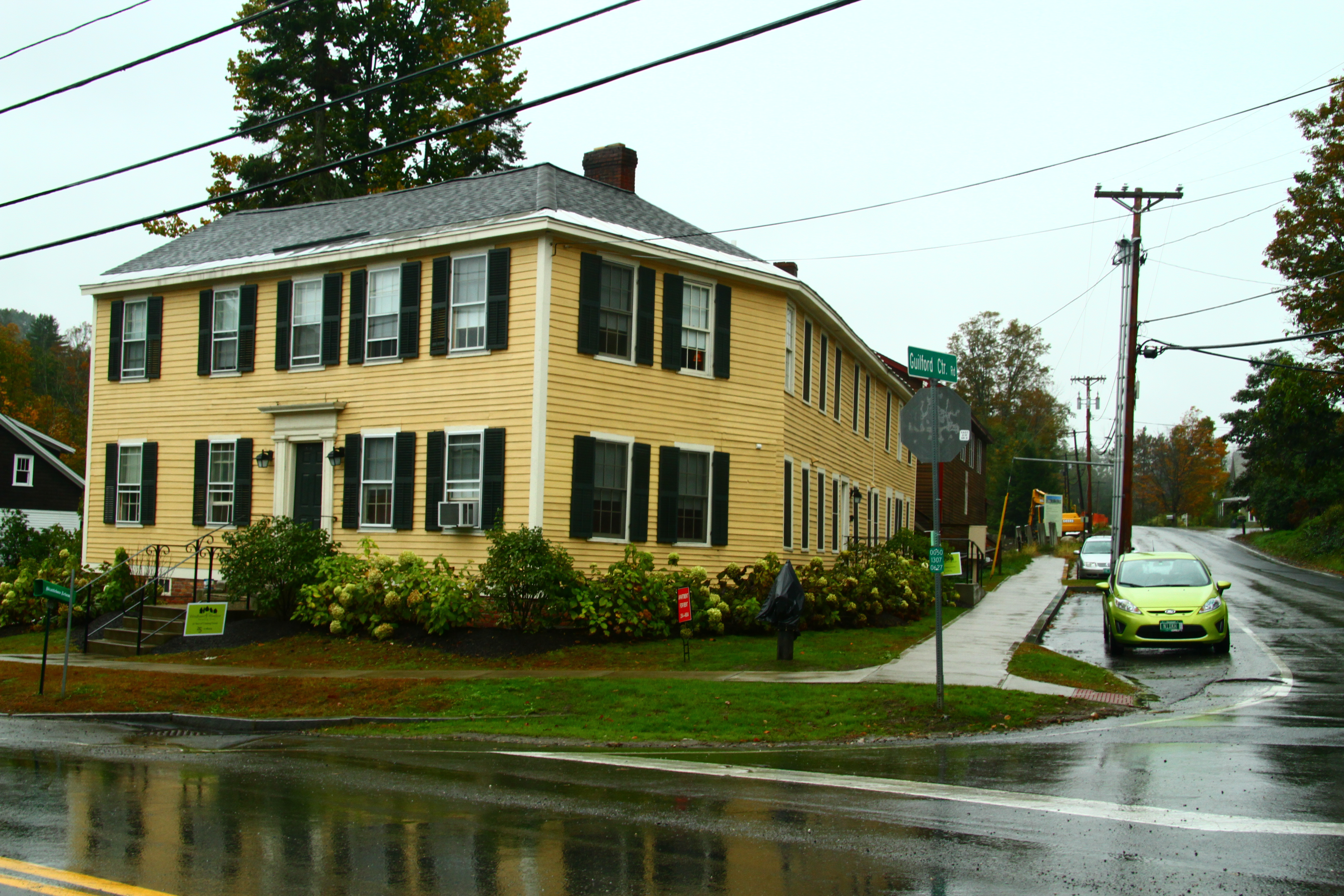

- Location within Vermont Location within the United States
- Location: 500 Coolidge Hwy. (US 5), Guilford, Vermont
- Coordinates: 42.817389°N 72.5754114°W
- Area: less than one acre
- Built: 1819
- Architectural style: Federal
- NRHP reference No.: 08000158
- Added to NRHP: May 2, 2008

The Tontine Building is a historic mixed-use commercial and residential building at 500 Coolidge Highway (United States Route 5) in Guilford, Vermont. Built in 1819, it is a rare example of a Federal period commercial building in southeastern Vermont, and is one of only three buildings in the state known to have been financed by a tontine, a subscription-based investment model. The building was listed on the National Register of Historic Places in 2008. It has been rehabilitated and converted entirely into housing units.

== Description and history ==
The Tontine Building occupies a prominent location in the village center of Guilford, at the southwestern corner of Guilford Center Road and US 5, the latter a major regional north-south artery. The building sits on a roughly triangular lot, resulting in a somewhat unusual building configuration, with a typical Federal period main block facing US 5, and a long ell extending at an angle along Guilford Center Road, with a "flatiron" angled corner section. The building is two stories in height, with a gabled roof, clapboard siding, and foundation of mixed materials, including dry-laid rubblestone, brick, and concrete. The main facade has a typical 5-bay Federal appearance, with a center entrance framed by pilasters and topped by an entablature with projecting cornice. The angled corner section is two bays wide, continuing the sash windows found on the main facade. The ell is ten bays long, of which six are original to the building, and four represent a mid 19th-century conversion of what had been an attached barn. The interior of the building has some original features, including its original front staircase, but has otherwise been converted into seven modern residential units.

The building was constructed in 1819, by a group of local investors organized into a tontine. This form of subscription-based investment was popular in the 18th century, with investment payouts distributed to the surviving investors. This building was owned by its tontine group until 1869, and was operated primarily with a drugstore in the commercial space, with tenement units behind. The investment group that owned the building was responsible for significant development of the village of East Guilford in the mid 19th century. This building saw a variety of commercial and residential uses prior to its conversion in 2008-10 to an exclusive residential use.

== See also ==
- National Register of Historic Places listings in Windham County, Vermont
