= Wheelock House (Townshend, Vermont) =

Historic house in Vermont, United States

- U.S. National Register of Historic Places
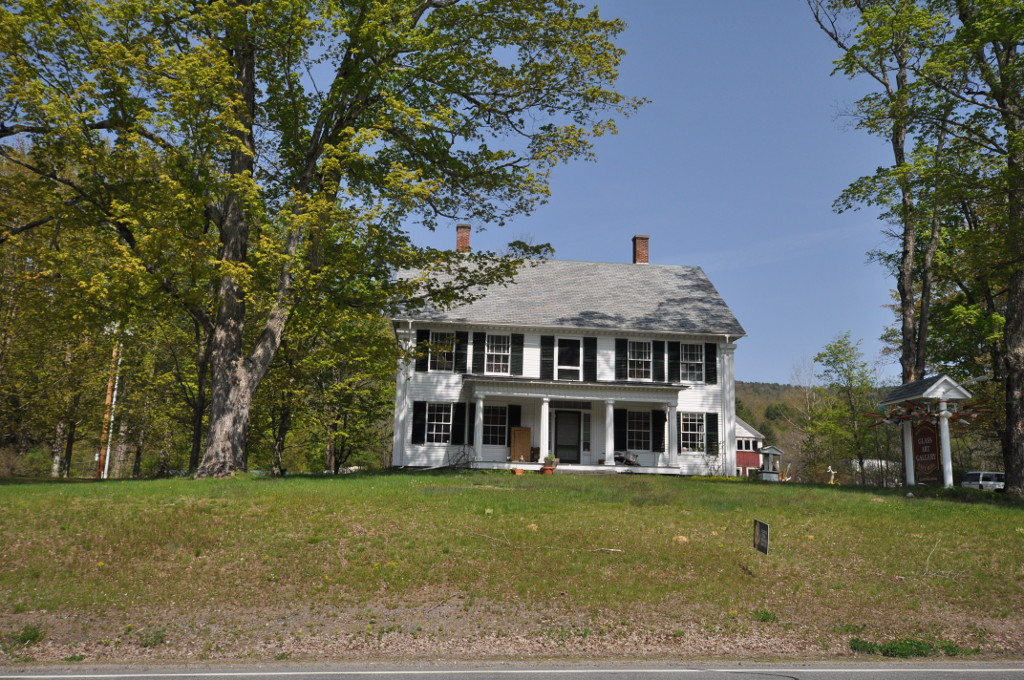

- Location within Vermont Location within the United States
- Location: 1096 VT 30, Townshend, Vermont
- Coordinates: 43°2′1″N 72°39′49″W
- Area: 4.1 acres (1.7 ha)
- Built: 1820
- Architectural style: Greek Revival
- NRHP reference No.: 86001033
- Added to NRHP: May 8, 1986

The Wheelock House is a historic house at 1096 Vermont Route 30 in Townshend, Vermont. Built in stages in the mid-19th century, it exhibits an unusual combination of Greek Revival and southern Gothic Revival features that is not otherwise known in Vermont. It is also possible that parts of the house were built using slave labor, an extremely rare occurrence in the state. The property, which now houses an art gallery, was listed on the National Register of Historic Places in 1986.

== Description and history ==
The Wheelock House is located in southern Townshend, on the east side of Vermont Route 30 about 1 mile (1.6 km) south of the village center. It is a 2 1/2-story wood-frame structure, five bays wide, with a side-gable roof, clapboard siding, two interior brick chimneys, and a granite foundation. It is set on a rise overlooking the road and the nearby West River. The corners of the building have paneled pilasters with molded capitals, rising to a narrow modillioned frieze. A single-story porch extends across the center three bays of the main facade, supported by octagonal tapered columns rising to a richly carved entablature. The main entrance is framed by sidelight and transom windows. The interior retains original plaster and woodwork of high quality, including a straight-run central staircase whose railings run continuously up to the attic level.

The oldest portion of the house is believed to be its kitchen ell, which was probably built about 1820 by a member of the Wood family, who had owned the property since 1779. In 1839 the property was sold to Caleb Wheelock, whose son Allen is credited with construction of the major portion of the house in the late 1850s. Allen Wheelock spent several years in Natchez, Mississippi, where he administered an estate and apparently acquired significant wealth, including four slaves. The house incorporates some design features and building practices that are more typical of the South than they are of Vermont, and some of its decorative materials (notably the porch columns) may have been brought north. Local folklore includes unconfirmed stories that the Wheelock slaves were involved in its construction.

== See also ==
- National Register of Historic Places listings in Windham County, Vermont
