= Dover Town Hall =

- U.S. National Register of Historic Places
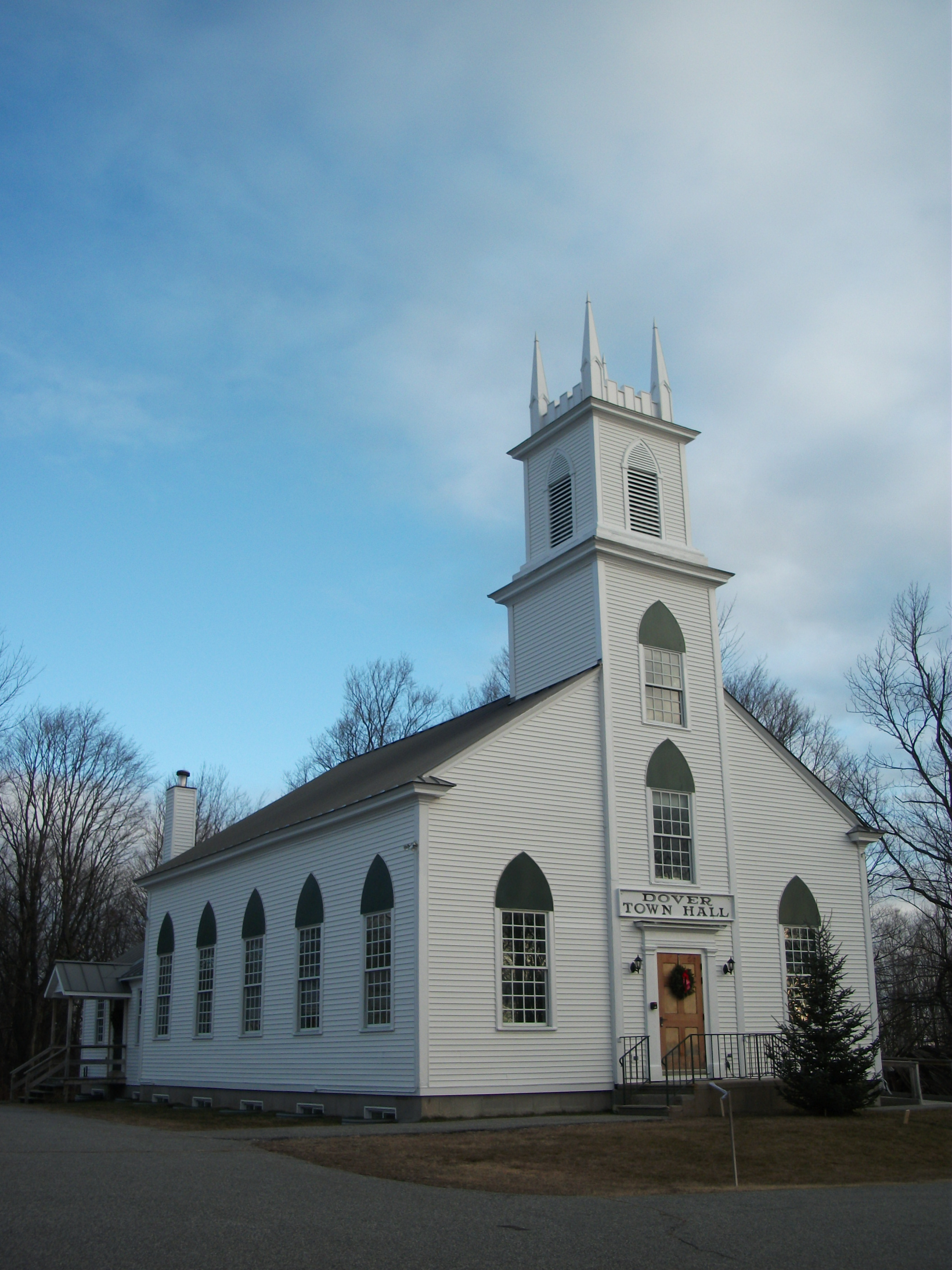

- Location within Vermont Location within the United States
- Interactive map showing the location of Dover Town Hall
- Location: Holland and Taft Brook Rds., Dover, Vermont
- Coordinates: 42°56′38″N 72°48′8″W
- Area: 1 acre (0.40 ha)
- Built: 1828
- Architectural style: Gothic Revival
- NRHP reference No.: 88001466
- Added to NRHP: September 1, 1988

Dover Town Hall is located in the village center of Dover, Vermont, at the junction of Holland and Taft Brook Roads. Built in 1828, it is a well-preserved example of a transitional Federal-Gothic Revival church building, converted to government use in 1875. It was listed on the National Register of Historic Places in 1988.

== Description and history ==
Dover Town Hall is set near the eastern end of Dover's town common, just southeast of the town's public library. It is a single-story wood-frame structure, with a front-facing gable roof, clapboard siding, and stone foundation. A tower projects slightly from the front (south-facing) facade, with a three-level first stage topped by a louvered belfry and a crenellated and pinnacled top. Windows are rectangular sash, and are topped by blind lancet-arched louvers, as are the belfry openings. The main entrance is in the base of the tower, flanked by pilasters and topped by a simple corniced entablature. A single-story kitchen wing extends to the rear of the building.

The building was erected in 1828 to serve as a union meeting house for Baptist, Methodist, and Universalist congregations. It is unusual as an early manifestation of the Gothic Revival style, its construction details unsupported by extant documentation, but supported by a close examination of the construction methods used to build some of its Gothic features. It was not uncommon for buildings constructed earlier to later have Gothic details (in this instance, the lancet-arched features) applied, but that does not appear to be the case with this building. The second stage of the tower appears to be a later 19th-century modification.

The building was used by the Baptists and Methodists until the 1850s, and by Congregationalists between 1872 and 1883. In 1872 the town voted to hold its town meetings here, a role the building played until 1971. There were calls to demolish the aging building in 1907, but it was instead repaired and formally taken over by the town. Today the town hall does not facilitate normal town or local business, rather, a clerks office is maintained in the town in another more modern building

== See also ==
- National Register of Historic Places listings in Windham County, Vermont
