= Lewis Grout House =

Historic house in Vermont, United States

- U.S. National Register of Historic Places
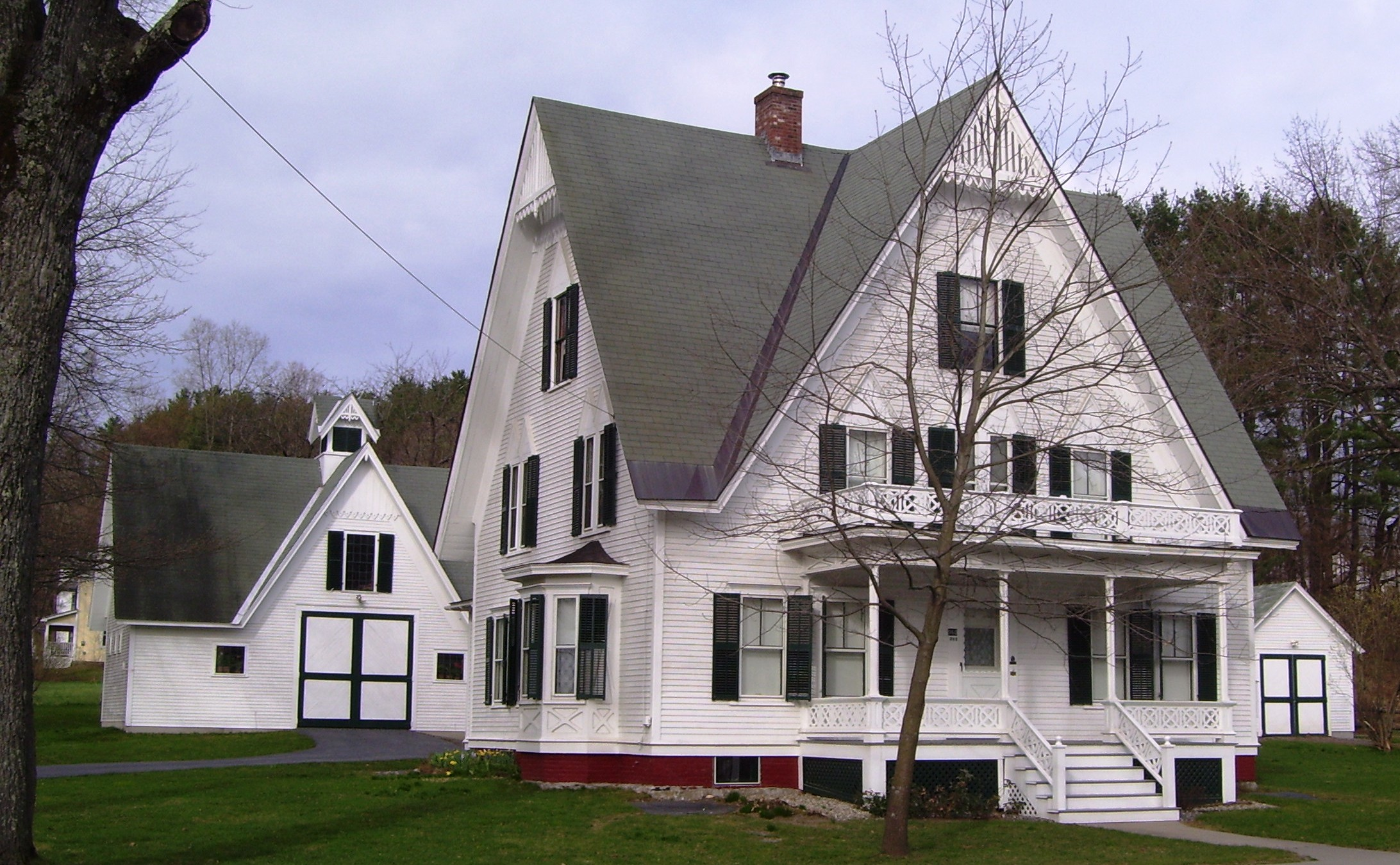

- Location within Vermont Location within the United States
- Location: Western Ave. at Bonnyvale Rd., Brattleboro, Vermont
- Coordinates: 42°51′13″N 72°36′6″W
- Area: 1 acre (0.40 ha)
- Built: 1880
- Architectural style: Gothic Revival
- NRHP reference No.: 96001328
- Added to NRHP: November 7, 1996

The Lewis Grout House is a historic house on Western Avenue at Bonnyvale Road in West Brattleboro, Vermont. Built in about 1880 for a widely traveled minister, it is a well-preserved and somewhat late example of Gothic Revival architecture. It was listed on the National Register of Historic Places in 1996.

== Description and history ==
The Grout House stands at the northwest corner of Bonnyvale Road and Western Avenue (Vermont Route 9), on a generous lot in the village of West Brattleboro. It is a 1-3/4 story wood-frame structure, with a steeply pitched cross-gable roof that shelters a full second floor and a smaller attic. The front facade, facing Western Avenue, is five bays wide on the ground floor, three on the second, and one on the third. A single-story porch extends across the center three bays, supported by cruciform posts, and sporting stickwork balustrades at the ground floor and around the roof. Windows on the upper levels have elongated pyramidal hood decorations, roughly matching in angle the roof pitch. There is Stick style decorate woodwork at the gable peaks.

The house was built about 1880 for Rev. Lewis Grout (1815-1905), a Yale graduate and missionary Congregationalist minister who spent 15 years at a remote missionary station in the Zulu country of South Africa. On his return to the US he wrote Zulu-Land: Or, Life Among the Zulu-Kafirs of Natal, South Africa (London: Trübner, 1864). The house's architecture appears to be influenced to some degree by British colonial architecture of that period, and is extremely unusual in Vermont, where there are only a limited number of Gothic Revival houses to be found.

== See also ==
- National Register of Historic Places listings in Windham County, Vermont
