= Pond Road Chapel =

- U.S. National Register of Historic Places
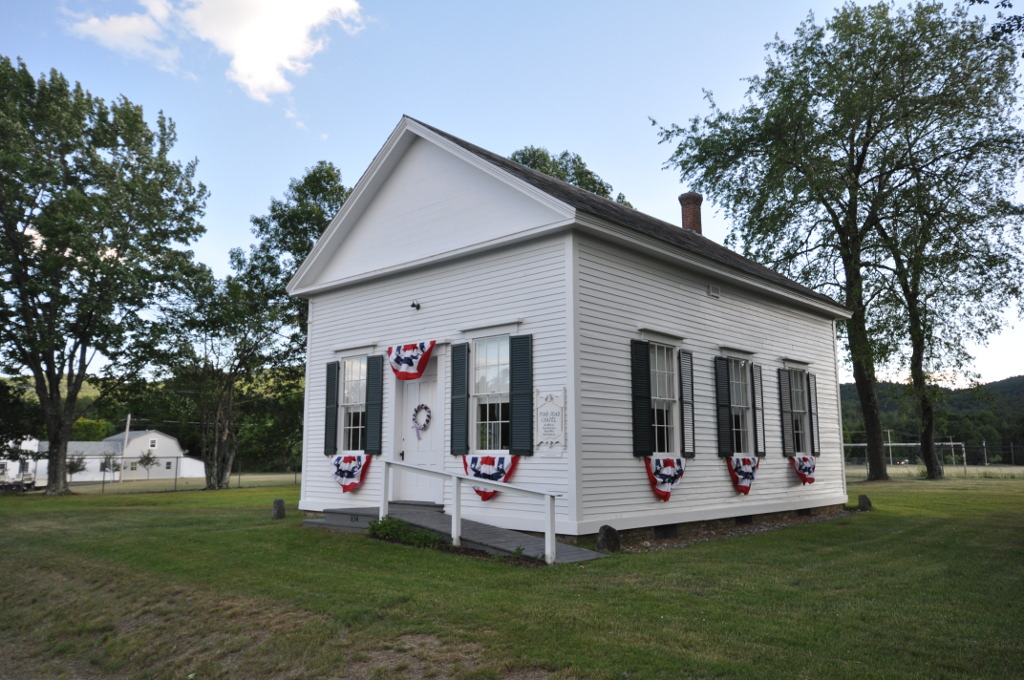

- Location within Vermont Location within the United States
- Location: Pond Rd., Town Hwy. #2, Vernon, Vermont
- Coordinates: 42°44′49″N 72°30′43″W
- Area: 0.3 acres (0.12 ha)
- Built: 1860
- Architectural style: Greek Revival, Vernacular Greek Revival
- NRHP reference No.: 85000959
- Added to NRHP: May 09, 1985

Pond Road Chapel is a historic chapel on Pond Road, Town Hwy. #2 in Vernon, Vermont. Built in 1860, it is a well-preserved example of rural, vernacular Greek Revival architecture, with a virtually intact 19th-century interior. The building was listed on the National Register of Historic Places in 1985.

== Description and history ==
The Pond Road Chapel is located near the geographic center of the rural community of Vernon, near the junction of Pond and Huckle Hill Roads. It is a modest single-story wood frame structure, measuring about 34 by 24 feet (10.4 m × 7.3 m). It is topped by a gable roof, finished in wooden clapboards, and rests on a brick foundation. The clapboards are original, and are fastened to the frame with hand-cut nails. The main facade is three bays wide, with the main entrance flanked by sash windows. Above these, the main gable, fully pedimented, is finished in flushboard. Windows are topped by simple cornices, as is the entry. The interior retains virtually all of its original finishes, including plaster, wallpaper, chair rails, wide flooring, and period carpeting in the aisles between the pews. Original oil lamps are mounted on the walls. The fixtures of the altar area are also original, including an Estey pump organ.

The chapel was built in 1860 for a recently organized congregation of Advent Christians. It was used by them for regular services until 1909, when they moved to larger facilities in South Vernon. The building was transferred to the local historical society in 1984, which now maintains it; the congregation still holds occasional services there.

== See also ==
- National Register of Historic Places listings in Windham County, Vermont
