= South Newfane Bridge =

- U.S. National Register of Historic Places
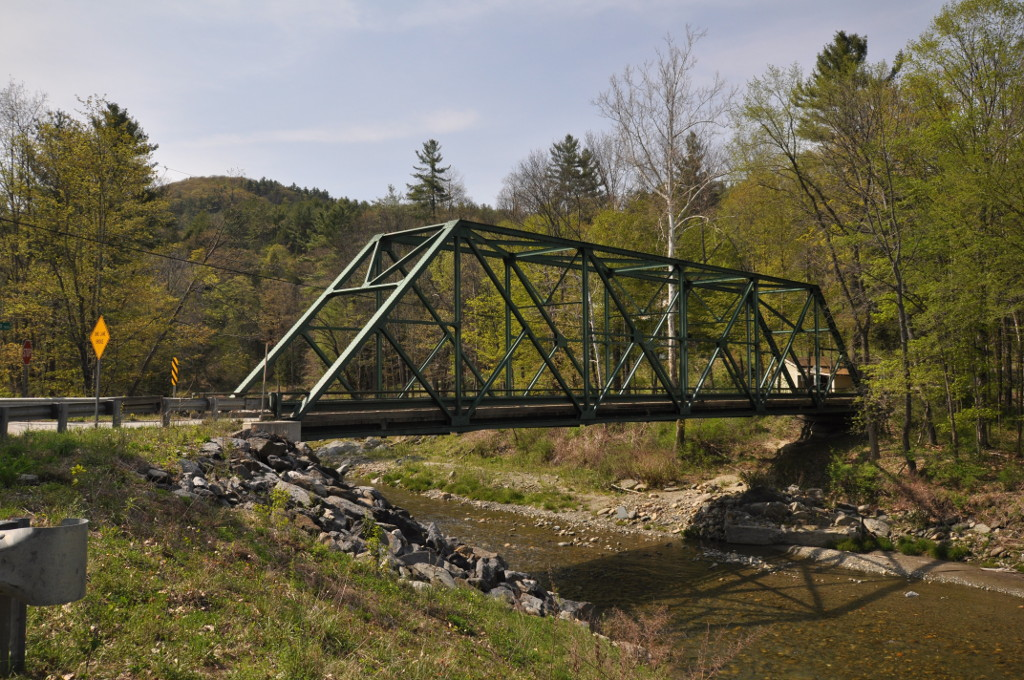

- Location within Vermont Location within the United States
- Location: Town Hwy. 26 (Parish Hill Rd.) over the Rock River, Newfane, Vermont
- Coordinates: 42°56′16″N 72°42′18″W
- Area: less than one acre
- Built: 1939
- Architectural style: Pratt through-truss bridge
- MPS: Metal Truss, Masonry, and Concrete Bridges in Vermont MPS
- NRHP reference No.: 92001174
- Added to NRHP: September 8, 1992

The South Newfane Bridge is a historic bridge, carrying Parish Hill Road across the Rock River in the village of South Newfane, Vermont. It is a Pratt through truss span, manufactured from rolled I-beams in 1939 to replace a bridge washed away in flooding. It was listed on the National Register of Historic Places in 1992.

== Description and history ==
The Rock River is an east-flowing tributary of the West River in southeastern Vermont. It runs across southern Newfane, where the village of South Newfane is located roughly midway across the width of the town. The South Newfane Bridge spans the river in a north–south direction, connecting Dover Road on the south side to Deer Hill Road, Chapin Road, and Parish Hill Road on the north side. The bridge is a single span metal Pratt through truss, 149 feet (45 m) long, with a roadway width of 13.8 feet (4.2 m) and a portal clearance of 15 feet (4.6 m). The bridge is set on concrete abutments. The trusses are built primarily out of steel I-beams, which have been fastened together using bolts. A truss system supports a wooden road bed, and guard rails are bolted to the trusses.

The bridge was built in 1939, following flooding that washed away the previous bridge at the site. It was funded from a combination of local, state, and federal sources, including Works Progress Administration funds. The use of I-beams in its construction marked an evolution in bridge construction after the state's devastating 1927 floods: the I-beams were less expensive, but added weight to the structure over earlier materials.

== See also ==
- National Register of Historic Places listings in Windham County, Vermont
- List of bridges on the National Register of Historic Places in Vermont
