= Vernon District Schoolhouse No. 4 =

- U.S. National Register of Historic Places
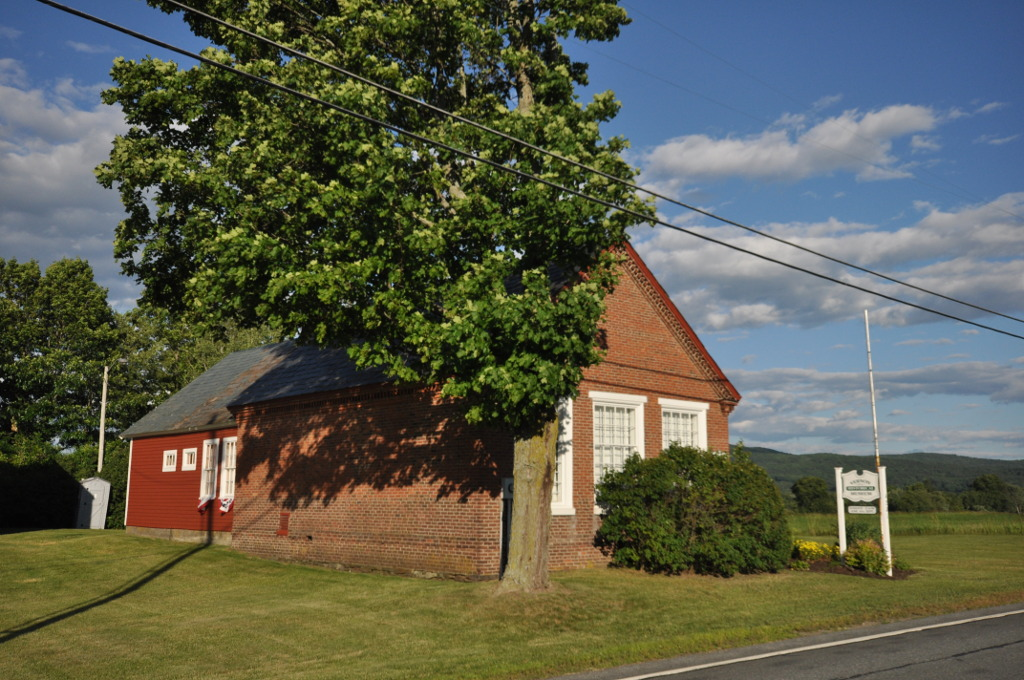

- Location within Vermont Location within the United States
- Location: 4201 Fort Bridgman Rd., Vernon, Vermont
- Coordinates: 42.73716°N 72.46966°W
- Area: less than one acre
- Built: 1848
- Architectural style: Greek Revival
- MPS: Educational Resources of Vermont MPS
- NRHP reference No.: 05001236
- Added to NRHP: November 9, 2005

The Vernon District Schoolhouse No. 4 is a historic school building at 4201 Fort Bridgman Road (Vermont Route 142) in Vernon, Vermont. Built 1848, it is a well-preserved mid-19th century brick district school, which now serves as a local historical museum. It was listed on the National Register of Historic Places in 2005.

== Description and history ==
The Vernon District Schoolhouse No. 4 is located in rural southern Vernon, on the east side of Fort Bridgman Road, just south of its junction with Pond Road. It is set on a lot overlooking the Connecticut River, which flows just to the east. It is a single-story brick structure, with a gabled roof and brick foundation. The street-facing facade is three bays wide, each occupied by a sash window. The south facade has a bank of six sash windows, while the north side has none. A wood-frame addition extends to the rear, with the main entrance in its southern facade, sheltered by a shed-roofed hood. Decorative detailing includes a band of corbeled brickwork in the cornices.

The main brick block of the school was built in 1848. One portion of the wood-frame addition was added in 1924, at which time the school's interior was probably also remodeled, to bring the building in line with new state standards. The addition was enlarged in 1941, adding inside chemical toilets to the building, again in response to new state requirements for indoor bathroom facilities. The school remained in use until 1954, when the town consolidated its districts into a single elementary school. The school sat vacant until 1972, when it was adapted for use as a local history museum by Vernon Historians, the local historical society. It is one of three surviving district school buildings in the town.

== See also ==
- National Register of Historic Places listings in Windham County, Vermont
