= Scott Farm Historic District =

Historic district in Vermont, United States

- U.S. National Register of Historic Places
- U.S. Historic district
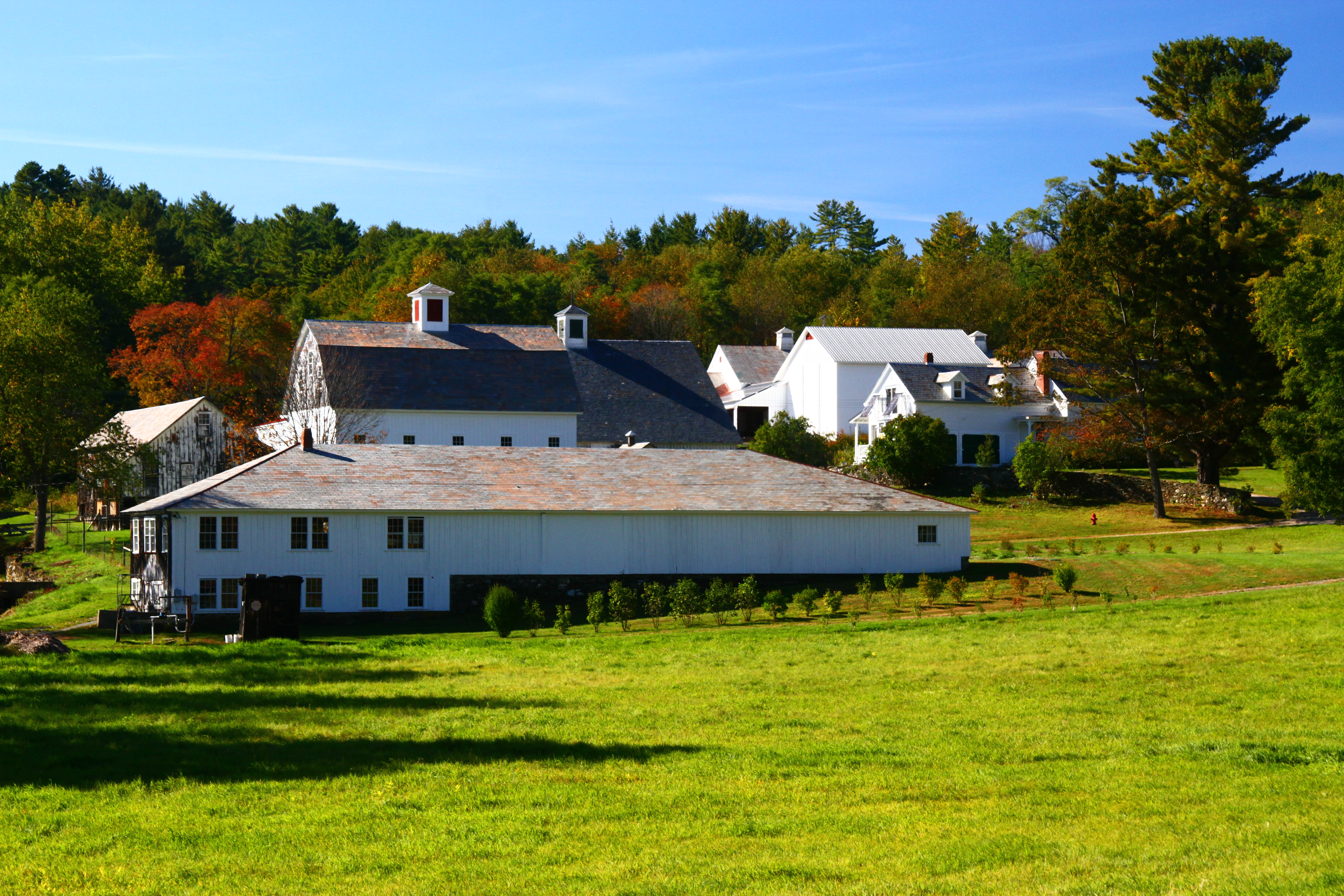

- Location within Vermont Location within the United States
- Location: 707 Kipling Rd., Dummerston, Vermont
- Coordinates: 42°54′34″N 72°34′14″W
- Area: 571 acres (231 ha)
- Built: 1845
- Architectural style: Greek Revival
- MPS: Agricultural Resources of Vermont MPS
- NRHP reference No.: 01001241
- Added to NRHP: November 19, 2001

The Scott Farm Historic District encompasses a historic farm property at 707 Kipling Road in Dummerston, Vermont. Developed between about 1850 and 1915, Scott Farm is a well-preserved farm and orchard complex of that period. It was listed on the National Register of Historic Places in 2001.

== Description and history ==
Scott Farm is set on more than 570 acres (230 ha) of rolling hills in southeastern Dummerston, a rural community in southeastern Vermont. The main farmstead is located on the southwest side of Kipling Road, consisting of a c. 1850 house along with a cluster of agricultural outbuildings, now mostly concerned with the production and processing of apples. Most of the farmstead buildings date to the between about 1911 and 1967. Just south of the complex are three ponds, impounded by concrete dams built about 1909 and renovated in 1975. Remote buildings on the property include another farmhouse (c. 1845) on the west side of Dutton Farm Road, and two early 20th-century cottages.

Portions of the land that makes up Scott Farm were probably cleared in the early 19th century, and used at subsistence levels. In 1845 Rufus Scott purchased the land that now makes up the core of the farm, building the Greek Revival farmhouse about 1850, and the Cow Barn in 1862. He operated a dairy farm at first, gradually diversifying the operation to include other activities. Apple trees were planted on the property by 1870, with forty trees producing fruit in 1880. Scott's farm was purchased in 1908 by Francis Holbrook II, a Boston lawyer, who proceeded to develop the farm as an apple orchard. He purchased the adjacent Dutton Farm in 1913. In 1995 Holbrook's heirs gave the farm to the Landmark Trust USA, a preservation organization that also owns nearby Naulakha, Rudyard Kipling's home.

Scott Farm hosts The Stone Trust, a non profit dedicated to preserving traditional dry stone walling techniques.

The orchard has over 140 different apple varieties.

== See also ==
- National Register of Historic Places listings in Windham County, Vermont
