= Brookline Baptist Church =

Historic church in Vermont, United States

- U.S. National Register of Historic Places
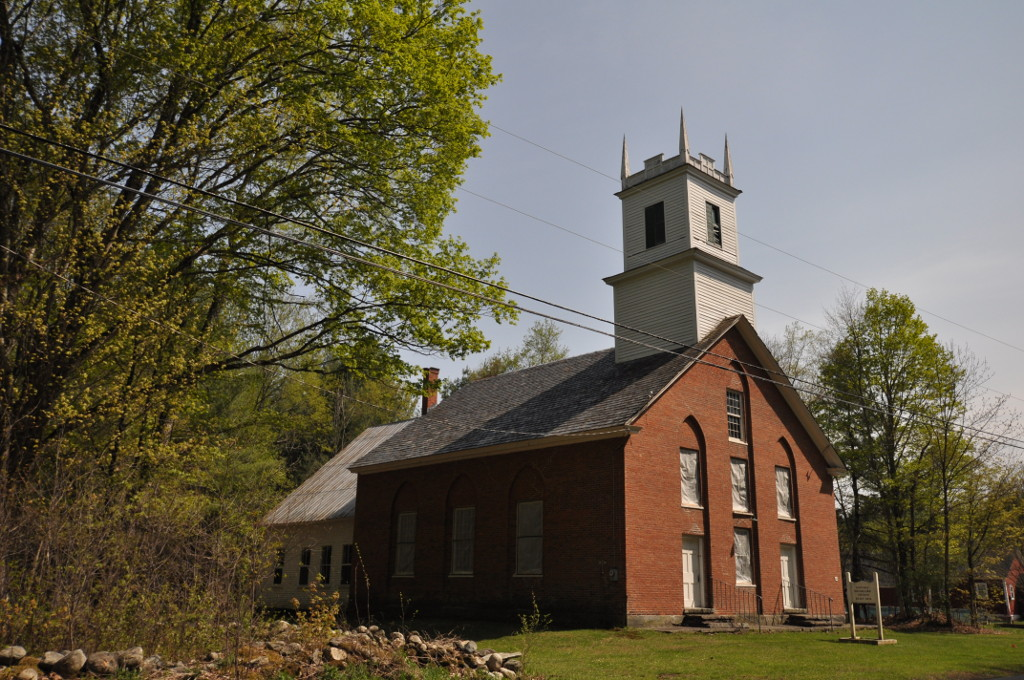

- Location within Vermont Location within the United States
- Location: 632 Grassy Brook Road, Brookline, Vermont
- Coordinates: 43°00′54″N 72°36′27″W
- Area: 0.5 acres (0.20 ha)
- Built: 1836
- Architectural style: Gothic Revival
- NRHP reference No.: 100006892
- Added to NRHP: September 1, 2021

Brookline Baptist Church is a historic former church building at 632 Grassy brook Road in Brookline, Vermont. It was built in 1836 for a congregation established in 1785, and served the congregation regularly until 1945. It is now used as a community function space. It is a locally distinctive example of vernacular Gothic Revival architecture, and it was listed on the National Register of Historic Places in 2021.

== Description and history ==
The former Brookline Baptist Church building is centrally located in the town of Brookline, on the east side of Grassy Brook Road, the town's principal thoroughfare. It is a 1-1/2 story brick building, with a wood-frame rear addition of slightly lower height. The main facade faces the street, and is three bays wide, with each bay articulated by a recessed Gothic arch panel. The outer bays have entrances on the first floor and windows on the second, while the center bay has windows at each of those levels, and in the gable. A two-stage square tower, framed in wood and finished in wooden clapboards, rises to pinnacles at the corners.

Brookline's first organized church congregation were Baptists, who established a formal organization in 1785. Early services were held in a barn, and it was not until 1836 that the congregation began to discuss the possibility of building a union church in conjunction with other local church groups. For unknown reasons, the Baptists opted to build their own church, and this building was the result. The rear addition, serving as a vestry, was added in 1895. Regular services were held until 1945, at which time the building was sold to the Brookline Ladies Benevolent Society. Since then, the building has been used for occasional summer services, weddings, community meetings, and town meetings.

== See also ==
- National Register of Historic Places listings in Windham County, Vermont
