= Corse-Shippee House =

Historic house in Vermont, United States

- U.S. National Register of Historic Places
- U.S. Historic district – Contributing property
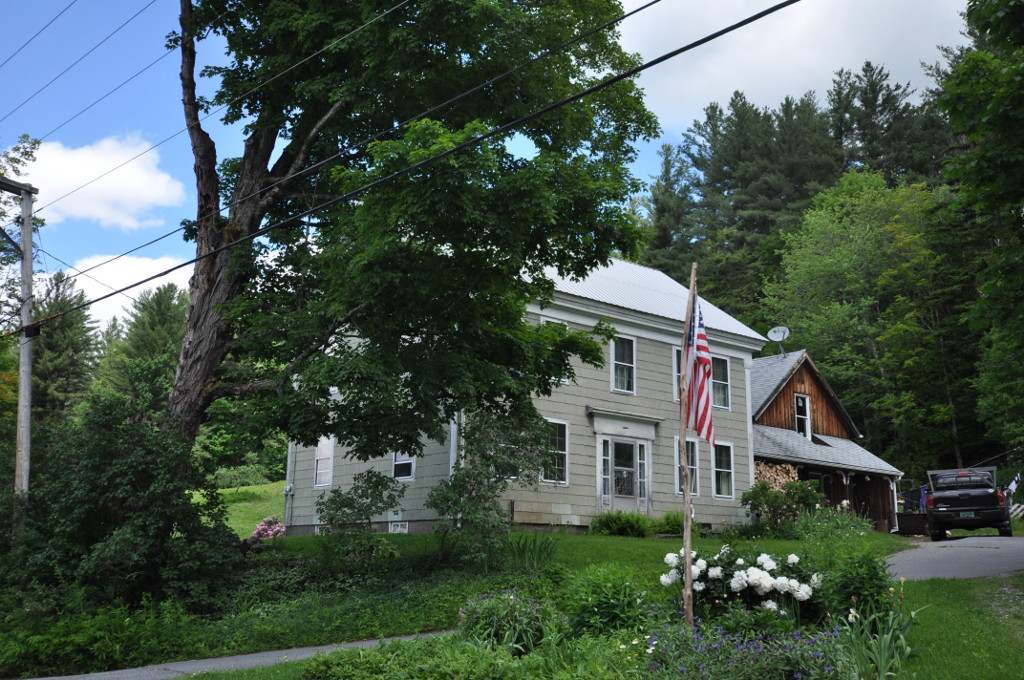

- Location within Vermont Location within the United States
- Location: 11 Dorr Fitch Rd., Dover, Vermont
- Coordinates: 42°56′8″N 72°50′52″W
- Area: 43.36 acres (17.55 ha)
- Built: 1860
- Architectural style: Greek Revival
- Part of: West Dover Village Historic District (ID85003381)
- NRHP reference No.: 08000386

Significant dates
- Added to NRHP: May 7, 2008
- Designated CP: October 24, 1985

The Corse-Shippee House is a historic house at 11 Dorr Fitch Road in West Dover, Vermont. Built in 1860, it is one of the village's finest examples of high-style Greek Revival architecture, and is sited on one of the few town farmsteads that has not been subdivided. The house was listed on the National Register of Historic Places in 2008; it was previously listed as a contributing property to the West Dover Village Historic District.

== Description and history ==
The Corse-Shippee House is located just on the southern fringe of West Dover Village, on the east side of Dorr Fitch Road a short way southeast of its junction with Vermont Route 100. It is set on a 43-acre (17 ha) parcel of land, along with a number of minor outbuildings. This lot is one-half of the original farmstead, whose other half is undeveloped. The house is a 2 1/2-story wood-frame structure, five bays wide, with a side-gable roof, asbestos siding (laid over the original clapboards), two interior chimneys, and a rubble stone foundation. The house is oriented perpendicular to the street, and has matching facades on its long sides. Both are symmetrical, with an elaborate entrance flanked by sidelight windows and pilasters, and topped by a corniced entablature. The building corners are pilastered. An ell with a cross-gable roof extends from the east (back) side of the building. The interior is remarkably unaltered, having only had one wall removed, and a bathroom added on the first floor.

The main house was built in 1860 by Orville Corse, and may have originally served as a tavern, given the configuration with two primary entrances. Since 1907 it has been owned by members of the Shippee family. It is the only two-story Greek Revival house in West Dover, and is one of the finest of the style in the entire town. Its siting on a substantial portion of the original farm property is also rare in the town, where many farms have been subdvidided for development.

== See also ==
- National Register of Historic Places listings in Windham County, Vermont
