= Brattleboro Downtown Historic District =

Historic district in Vermont, United States

- U.S. National Register of Historic Places
- U.S. Historic district
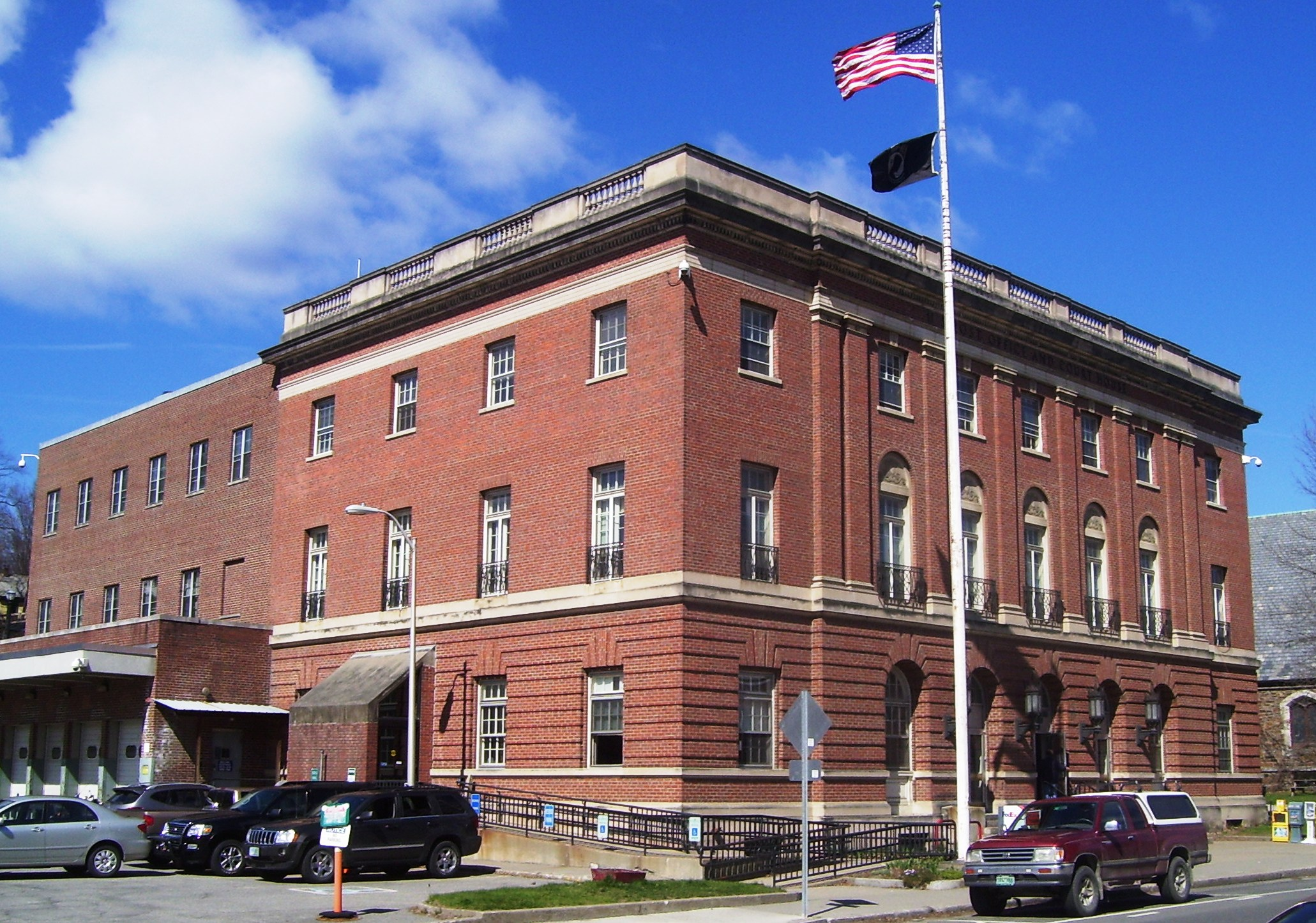
- Post office and courthouse

- Location within Vermont Location within the United States
- Location: Main St. from Vernon to Walnut, Flat, Elliot, High, and Grove Sts., Plaza Park, Brattleboro, Vermont
- Area: 22 acres (8.9 ha) (original); 1 acre (0.40 ha) (increase)
- Built: 1840
- Architectural style: Greek Revival, Georgian
- NRHP reference No.: 83003225 (original); 04000982 (increase)

Significant dates
- Added to NRHP: February 17, 1983
- Boundary increase: September 15, 2004

The Brattleboro Downtown Historic District encompasses most of the central business district of the town of Brattleboro, Vermont. Extending along Main Street between Whetstone Brook and a junction with Pultney Road and Linden and Walnut Streets, this area includes many of the town's prominent civic and institutional buildings. The area's development took place primarily in the 19th century, with surviving buildings from both the 18th and early 20th centuries. The district was listed on the National Register of Historic Places in 1983, and was enlarged in 2004 to include Plaza Park and the Holstein Building on the south side of Whetstone Brook.

== Description and history ==
The town of Brattleboro, now the major commercial center of southeastern Vermont, was chartered in 1753 and settled in the 1760s. Its present town center grew around mills that were built on Whetstone Brook. A bridge spanned the adjacent Connecticut River in 1804, making overland travel to points eastward more feasible. In 1811 the first paper mill was built on Whetstone Brook, inaugurating related industries that would come to dominate the town's economy. The railroad arrived in 1849, bringing increased development and commerce. Following a major flood in 1869 and fires in 1869 and 1877, there was a flurry of new development in the downtown area, lasting until about 1910, which gave the area much of its present character.

The district is bounded at its northern end by the fourway junction of Main, Linden and Walnut Streets, and Pultney Road. Near this point the 1890 Wells Fountain stands as sentinel marking the upper end of the business district. The district extends from this point southward along Main Street, with a few properties included on side streets that extend westward, to the intersection of Bridge, Canal and Vernon Streets, just south of Whetstone Brook. This intersection is highlighted by Plaza Park, laid out in 1923, which includes as a central feature a casting of Daniel Chester French's Spirit of Life statue. The only buildings included in the district south of the brook are the former railroad station, now the Brattleboro Museum and Art Center, and the Holstein Association Building, its oldest section dating to 1917. Prominent buildings lining Main Street in between include the former Brooks House Hotel, a Second Empire work of Vermont native Elbridge Boyden.

== See also ==
- National Register of Historic Places listings in Windham County, Vermont
