= National Register of Historic Places listings in Windham County, Vermont =

Location of Windham County in Vermont

The National Register of Historic Places is a United States federal official list of places and sites considered worthy of preservation. In Windham County, Vermont, there are 100 properties and districts listed on the National Register, including 2 National Historic Landmarks.

This National Park Service list is complete through NPS recent listings posted August 28, 2026.

Contents: Counties in Vermont
Addison - Bennington - Caledonia - Chittenden - Essex - Franklin - Grand Isle - Lamoille - Orange - Orleans - Rutland - Washington - Windham - Windsor

== Current listings ==
	Name on the Register	Image	Date listed	Location	City or town	Description
1	Adams Gristmill Warehouse	Adams Gristmill Warehouse	January 22, 1990 (#88002162)	Bridge St. 43°08′07″N 72°26′30″W	Bellows Falls	
2	Bartonsville Covered Bridge	Bartonsville Covered Bridge	July 2, 1973 (#73000201)	Across the Williams River at the southern end of Bartonsville; 43°13′27″N 72°32′12″W	Rockingham	Destroyed in 2011 by flash flooding caused by Hurricane Irene, and rebuilt in 2012.
3	Bellows Falls Co-operative Creamery Complex	Bellows Falls Co-operative Creamery Complex	January 22, 1990 (#88002164)	Bridge St. 43°08′10″N 72°26′32″W	Bellows Falls	
4	Bellows Falls Downtown Historic District	Bellows Falls Downtown Historic District	August 16, 1982 (#82001706)	Depot, Canal, Rockingham, Bridge, Mill, and Westminster Sts. 43°08′04″N 72°26′42″W	Bellows Falls	
5	Bellows Falls Neighborhood Historic District	Bellows Falls Neighborhood Historic District	January 17, 2002 (#01001477)	Atkinson, Westminster, School, and Hapgood Sts., Hapgood Pl., and Burt St., Henry St., South St., Hadley St., and Temple Pl.; also Center, Front, Old Terrace, and Pine Sts. 43°07′53″N 72°26′57″W	Bellows Falls	Second set of streets represents a boundary increase
6	Bellows Falls Petroglyph Site (VT-WD-8)	Bellows Falls Petroglyph Site (VT-WD-8)	January 22, 1990 (#88002166)	Address Restricted; 43°08′07″N 72°26′26″W	Bellows Falls	
7	Bellows Falls Times Building	Bellows Falls Times Building	January 22, 1990 (#88002160)	Bridge and Island Sts. 43°08′05″N 72°26′34″W	Bellows Falls	
8	Brattleboro Downtown Historic District	Brattleboro Downtown Historic District	February 17, 1983 (#83003225)	Main St. from Vernon to Walnut, Flat, Elliot, High, and Grove Sts.; also Plaza Park, Main St. at its junction with Canal St., Vermont Routes 119 and 142, and 1 Holstein Place; 42°51′13″N 72°33′35″W	Brattleboro	Second set of streets represents a boundary increase dating to September 15, 2004
9	Brattleboro Retreat	Brattleboro Retreat	April 12, 1984 (#84003478)	Linden St. and Upper Dummerston Rd. 42°51′52″N 72°34′17″W	Brattleboro	
10	Bridge 19	Bridge 19	September 28, 2007 (#07001025)	Grassy Brook Rd. 42°59′44″N 72°38′16″W	Brookline and Newfane	aka the Brookline-Newfane Bridge
11	Broad Brook Grange Hall	Broad Brook Grange Hall	September 20, 2022 (#100008221)	3940 Guilford Center Rd. 42°47′37″N 72°37′27″W	Guilford	
12	Broad Brook House	Broad Brook House	August 4, 2011 (#11000517)	475 Coolidge Hwy. 42°49′04″N 72°34′31″W	Guilford	
13	Brookline Baptist Church	Brookline Baptist Church	September 1, 2021 (#100006892)	632 Grassy Brook Rd. 43°00′54″N 72°36′27″W	Brookline	
14	Brooks House	Brooks House	February 1, 1980 (#80000343)	4 High St. and 128 Main St. 42°51′12″N 72°33′31″W	Brattleboro	
15	Butterfield House	Butterfield House	August 6, 2005 (#05000806)	204 Main St. 43°10′18″N 72°36′25″W	Grafton	Now the Grafton Public Library
16	Canal Street Schoolhouse	Canal Street Schoolhouse	August 19, 1977 (#77000103)	Canal St. at Clark St. 42°50′52″N 72°33′40″W	Brattleboro	
17	Canal Street-Clark Street Neighborhood Historic District	Canal Street-Clark Street Neighborhood Historic District	July 8, 1993 (#93000593)	Roughly bounded by Canal, S. Main, Lawrence and Clark Sts. 42°50′56″N 72°33′35″W	Brattleboro	
18	Christ Church	Christ Church	May 13, 1982 (#82001707)	Melendy Rd. and U.S. Route 5; 42°48′58″N 72°34′30″W	Guilford	
19	Corse-Shippee House	Corse-Shippee House	May 7, 2008 (#08000386)	11 Dorr Fitch Rd. 42°56′08″N 72°50′52″W	Dover	
20	Theophilus Crawford House	Theophilus Crawford House	March 9, 1995 (#95000175)	Southwestern side of Hickory Ridge Rd., about 2 mi (3.2 km) north of Putney; 42°59′55″N 72°32′14″W	Putney	
21	Creamery Covered Bridge	Creamery Covered Bridge	August 28, 1973 (#73000202)	West of Brattleboro off Vermont Route 9; 42°50′58″N 72°35′12″W	Brattleboro	
22	Crows Nest	Crows Nest	May 18, 1998 (#98000431)	36 Sturgis Dr. 42°54′43″N 72°53′01″W	Wilmington	
23	Dickinson Estate Historic District	Dickinson Estate Historic District	November 9, 2005 (#05001237)	Dickinson and Kipling Rds. 42°53′37″N 72°33′55″W	Brattleboro	
24	District No. 1 Schoolhouse	District No. 1 Schoolhouse	April 20, 1992 (#92000337)	Somerset Rd. 42°57′40″N 72°59′02″W	Somerset	
25	Dover Town Hall	Dover Town Hall	September 1, 1988 (#88001466)	School House Rd. 42°56′38″N 72°48′08″W	Dover	
26	East Putney Brook Stone Arch Bridge	East Putney Brook Stone Arch Bridge	December 12, 1976 (#76000149)	Spans East Putney Brook off River Rd. 42°59′09″N 72°28′09″W	East Putney	
27	Estey Organ Company Factory	Estey Organ Company Factory	April 17, 1980 (#80000344)	Birge St.; also 68 Birge St. 42°50′51″N 72°34′04″W	Brattleboro	68 Birge represents a boundary increase
28	First Congregational Church and Meetinghouse	First Congregational Church and Meetinghouse	November 15, 2002 (#02001344)	Near the junction of Vermont Routes 30 and 35; 43°02′49″N 72°40′10″W	Townshend	
29	Follett Stone Arch Bridge Historic District	Follett Stone Arch Bridge Historic District	December 12, 1976 (#76000150)	West of Townshend off Vermont Route 30; 43°02′48″N 72°41′59″W	Townshend	
30	Gas Station at Bridge and Island Streets	Gas Station at Bridge and Island Streets	January 22, 1990 (#88002161)	Bridge and Island Sts. 43°08′06″N 72°26′32″W	Bellows Falls	
31	George-Pine-Henry Street Historic District	George-Pine-Henry Street Historic District	July 13, 2010 (#09000918)	5-22 George St.; 1-17 Pine St.; 32-44 Henry St. 43°07′52″N 72°27′02″W	Rockingham	
32	Grafton Congregational Church and Chapel	Grafton Congregational Church and Chapel	December 10, 1979 (#79000230)	Main St. 43°10′24″N 72°36′42″W	Grafton	
33	Grafton District Schoolhouse No. 2	Grafton District Schoolhouse No. 2	August 11, 2005 (#05000868)	217 Main St. 43°10′19″N 72°36′24″W	Grafton	Also served as a fire station 1922-92.
34	Grafton Post Office	Grafton Post Office	August 6, 2005 (#05000807)	205 Main St. 43°10′19″N 72°36′25″W	Grafton	
35	Grafton Village Historic District	Grafton Village Historic District	April 7, 2010 (#10000171)	Main St., Vermont Route 121 E., Townshend Rd., Chester Hill Rd., Hidder Hill Rd., Pleasant St., School St., Middletown Rd., and Hinck; 43°10′18″N 72°36′24″W	Grafton	
36	Green River Covered Bridge	Green River Covered Bridge	August 28, 1973 (#73000203)	Across the Green River; 42°46′31″N 72°40′04″W	Green River	
37	Green River Crib Dam	Green River Crib Dam	April 7, 1995 (#95000374)	Green River Rd. (Town Highway 5); 42°46′32″N 72°40′04″W	Guilford	
38	Lewis Grout House	Lewis Grout House	November 7, 1996 (#96001328)	960? Western Ave. (at Bonnyvale Rd.); 42°51′13″N 72°36′06″W	Brattleboro	
39	Guilford Center Meeting House	Guilford Center Meeting House	May 13, 1982 (#82001708)	4042 Guilford Center Rd. 42°47′31″N 72°37′32″W	Guilford	
40	Hall Covered Bridge	Hall Covered Bridge	August 28, 1973 (#73000204)	West of Bellows Falls across the Saxtons River, off Vermont Route 121; 43°08′12″N 72°29′16″W	Bellows Falls	Bridge collapsed in 1980 and was rebuilt as a replica of the old bridge in 1982.
41	William A. Hall House	William A. Hall House	May 5, 1999 (#99000537)	1 Hapgood St. 43°07′48″N 72°26′44″W	Bellows Falls	
42	William Harris House	William Harris House	December 18, 1978 (#78000250)	Western Ave. 42°51′01″N 72°35′20″W	Brattleboro	
43	Deacon John Holbrook House	Deacon John Holbrook House	March 19, 1982 (#82001709)	80 Linden Street; 42°51′24″N 72°33′43″W	Brattleboro	
44	Homestead-Horton Neighborhood Historic District	Homestead-Horton Neighborhood Historic District	April 3, 2009 (#09000160)	Homestead Pl., Horton Pl., and Canal St. 42°50′49″N 72°33′42″W	Brattleboro	
45	Houghtonville Historic District	Houghtonville Historic District	September 8, 2015 (#15000583)	Houghtonville, Stagecoach & Cabell Rds. 43°11′52″N 72°38′51″W	Grafton	
46	Howard Hardware Storehouse	Howard Hardware Storehouse	January 22, 1990 (#88002163)	Bridge St. 43°08′09″N 72°26′27″W	Bellows Falls	
47	Governor Hunt House	Governor Hunt House	April 11, 2022 (#100007573)	322 Governor Hunt Rd. 42°46′33″N 72°30′57″W	Vernon	
48	Kidder Covered Bridge	Kidder Covered Bridge	July 2, 1973 (#73000205)	Southeast of Grafton; 43°10′08″N 72°36′21″W	Grafton	
49	Londonderry Town House	Londonderry Town House	July 14, 1983 (#83003227)	Middletown Rd. 43°11′41″N 72°48′54″W	South Londonderry	
50	Mechanicsville Historic District	Mechanicsville Historic District	September 16, 2010 (#10000766)	Route 121 E. 43°10′13″N 72°35′57″W	Grafton	
51	Medburyville Bridge	Medburyville Bridge	November 8, 1990 (#90001746)	Town Highway 31 over the Deerfield River; 42°52′16″N 72°55′12″W	Wilmington	
52	Middletown Rural Historic District	Middletown Rural Historic District	March 21, 2011 (#11000101)	Middletown Rd., Avery Park Dr., Middletown Cemetery Rd., Woodchuck Hill Rd., Vermont Route 121; 43°11′18″N 72°37′25″W	Grafton	
53	Milldean and Alexander-Davis House	Milldean and Alexander-Davis House	May 24, 1990 (#90000815)	Main St. near town center 43°10′19″N 72°36′28″W	Grafton	
54	Miss Bellows Falls Diner	Miss Bellows Falls Diner	February 15, 1983 (#83003226)	90 Rockingham St. 43°08′06″N 72°26′51″W	Bellows Falls	
55	Moore and Thompson Paper Mill Complex	Moore and Thompson Paper Mill Complex	March 16, 1984 (#84003475)	Bridge St. 43°08′01″N 72°26′29″W	Bellows Falls	
56	Naulakha	Naulakha	April 11, 1979 (#79000231)	Off U.S. Route 5; 42°53′55″N 72°33′51″W	Dummerston	Home where Rudyard Kipling wrote The Jungle Book
57	Newfane Village Historic District	Newfane Village Historic District	July 21, 1983 (#83003228)	Main, West, Church, Court, Depot, and Cross Sts. 42°59′16″N 72°39′26″W	Newfane	
58	Oak Hill Cemetery Chapel	Oak Hill Cemetery Chapel	November 14, 1991 (#91001613)	Off Pleasant St. 43°07′32″N 72°27′10″W	Bellows Falls	
59	Old Brick Church	Old Brick Church	November 30, 1979 (#79000340)	Off Vermont Route 35; 43°07′23″N 72°34′42″W	Athens	
60	Park Farm	Park Farm	August 4, 2003 (#03000737)	26 Woodchuck Hill Rd. 43°11′26″N 72°37′31″W	Grafton	
61	Parker Hill Rural Historic District	Parker Hill Rural Historic District	May 20, 1993 (#93000431)	Parker Hill and Lower Parker Hill Rds. 43°13′25″N 72°28′46″W	Rockingham	
62	Pond Road Chapel	Pond Road Chapel	May 9, 1985 (#85000959)	Pond Rd., Town Highway 2; 42°44′49″N 72°30′43″W	Vernon	
63	Putney Village Historic District	Putney Village Historic District	February 20, 1986 (#86000324)	Westminster W Rd., U.S. Route 5, Christian Sq., Old U.S. Route 5, and Depot Rd. 42°58′30″N 72°31′27″W	Putney	
64	Rice Farm Road Bridge	Rice Farm Road Bridge	November 7, 1995 (#95001259)	Town Highway 62, off Vermont Route 30; 42°54′58″N 72°36′48″W	Dummerston	
65	Robertson Paper Company Complex	Robertson Paper Company Complex	January 22, 1990 (#88002165)	Island St. 43°08′09″N 72°26′36″W	Bellows Falls	Demolished in 2018-19
66	Rockingham Meetinghouse	Rockingham Meetinghouse	September 10, 1979 (#79000232)	Meeting House Rd. 43°11′16″N 72°29′13″W	Rockingham	A rare 18th-century New England meetinghouse of the "second period" type.
67	Rockingham Village Historic District	Rockingham Village Historic District	January 4, 2008 (#07001346)	Meeting House Rd., Rockingham Hill Rd. 43°11′17″N 72°29′20″W	Rockingham	
68	Round Schoolhouse	Round Schoolhouse	November 23, 1977 (#77000104)	South of Brookline; 43°01′17″N 72°36′17″W	Brookline	
69	Sabin-Wheat Farm	Sabin-Wheat Farm	July 28, 2004 (#04000771)	346 Westminster Rd. 42°59′58″N 72°31′55″W	Putney	
70	Sacketts Brook Stone Arch Bridge	Sacketts Brook Stone Arch Bridge	December 12, 1976 (#76000151)	Off U.S. Route 5 on Mill Rd. 42°58′29″N 72°31′05″W	Putney	
71	Saxtons River Village Historic District	Saxtons River Village Historic District	September 29, 1988 (#88001851)	Roughly bounded by Burk Hill and Belleview Rds., Oak St., the Saxtons River, and Westminster West Rd. 43°08′19″N 72°30′34″W	Saxtons River	
72	Scott Covered Bridge	Scott Covered Bridge	August 28, 1973 (#73000206)	West of Townshend off Vermont Route 30; 43°02′53″N 72°41′50″W	Townshend	
73	Scott Farm Historic District	Scott Farm Historic District	November 19, 2001 (#01001241)	707 Kipling Rd. 42°54′34″N 72°34′14″W	Dummerston	
74	Simpsonville Stone Arch Bridge	Simpsonville Stone Arch Bridge	April 11, 1977 (#77000105)	North of Townshend on Vermont Route 35; 43°04′13″N 72°39′19″W	Townshend	
75	Samuel Gilbert Smith Farmstead	Samuel Gilbert Smith Farmstead	July 20, 2000 (#00000830)	375 Orchard St. 42°51′38″N 72°35′19″W	Brattleboro	
76	South Londonderry Village Historic District	South Londonderry Village Historic District	July 24, 1986 (#86001943)	Church, Main, River, School, and Farnum Sts., and Melendy Hill Rd. 43°11′18″N 72°48′43″W	South Londonderry	
77	South Newfane Bridge	South Newfane Bridge	September 8, 1992 (#92001174)	Town Highway 26 (Parish Hill Rd.) over the Rock River; 42°56′16″N 72°42′18″W	Newfane	
78	South Windham Village Historic District	South Windham Village Historic District	October 27, 1988 (#88002061)	Town Highways 1 and 26; 43°07′42″N 72°42′47″W	Windham	
79	Stratton Mountain Lookout Tower	Stratton Mountain Lookout Tower	June 17, 1992 (#92000687)	Summit of Stratton Mountain in the Green Mountain National Forest; 43°05′09″N 72°55′30″W	Stratton	
80	Tontine Building	Tontine Building	May 2, 2008 (#08000158)	500 Coolidge Highway; 42°49′03″N 72°34′31″W	Guilford	
81	Townshend State Park	Townshend State Park	February 14, 2002 (#02000030)	2755 State Forest Rd. 43°02′13″N 72°42′15″W	Townshend	
82	Union Station	Union Station	June 7, 1974 (#74000268)	Junction of Bridge St. and Boston and Maine railroad tracks 42°51′05″N 72°33′25″W	Brattleboro	
83	Vermont Academy Campus Historic District	Vermont Academy Campus Historic District	July 14, 2015 (#15000423)	10 Long Walk; 43°08′31″N 72°30′32″W	Rockingham	
84	Vernon District Schoolhouse No. 4	Vernon District Schoolhouse No. 4	November 9, 2005 (#05001236)	4201 Fort Bridgman Rd. 42°44′14″N 72°28′11″W	Vernon	
85	West Brattleboro Green Historic District	West Brattleboro Green Historic District	June 24, 2002 (#02000675)	870-950 Western Ave., 19-35 South St., and town common. 42°51′09″N 72°36′00″W	Brattleboro	
86	West Dover Village Historic District	West Dover Village Historic District	October 24, 1985 (#85003381)	Vermont Route 100, Valley View, Cross Town, Parsonage, Dorr Fitch, and Bogle Rds. 42°56′14″N 72°51′03″W	Dover	
87	West Dummerston Covered Bridge	West Dummerston Covered Bridge	May 8, 1973 (#73000207)	Dummerston Center Rd. and Vermont Route 30, over the West River; 42°56′12″N 72°36′49″W	Dummerston	
88	West Townshend Stone Arch Bridge	West Townshend Stone Arch Bridge	April 18, 1977 (#77000106)	Spans Tannery Brook; 43°05′03″N 72°42′36″W	West Townshend	
89	West Townshend Village Historic District	West Townshend Village Historic District	September 11, 1986 (#86001502)	Roughly Main St. from Old Vermont Route 30 to Vermont Route 30 and Town Roads 7, 23, 47, 49, and 50; 43°04′55″N 72°42′38″W	West Townshend	
90	Westminster Terrace Historic District	Westminster Terrace Historic District	July 13, 2010 (#09000265)	Along Westminster Terrace; 43°07′36″N 72°26′34″W	Rockingham and Westminster	
91	Westminster Village Historic District	Westminster Village Historic District	July 14, 1988 (#88001058)	Main and School Sts., and Grout Ave. 43°04′03″N 72°27′42″W	Westminster	
92	Wheelock House	Wheelock House	May 8, 1986 (#86001033)	Vermont Route 30; 43°02′01″N 72°39′49″W	Townshend	
93	Whitingham Village Historic District	Whitingham Village Historic District	March 15, 2006 (#06000140)	Vermont Route 100, School St., Brook St., and Stimpson Hill Rd. 42°47′25″N 72°52′49″W	Whitingham	
94	Williams River Route 5 Bridge	Williams River Route 5 Bridge	November 14, 1991 (#91001603)	U.S. Route 5 over the Williams River; 43°10′57″N 72°27′36″W	Rockingham	
95	Williams Street Extension Historic District	Williams Street Extension Historic District	July 13, 2010 (#09000893)	51-58, 61-68, 70 Williams St. 43°08′08″N 72°27′09″W	Rockingham	
96	Williamsville Covered Bridge	Williamsville Covered Bridge	August 14, 1973 (#73000208)	Southwest of Newfane at Williamsville; 42°56′34″N 72°41′17″W	Newfane	
97	Wilmington Village Historic District	Wilmington Village Historic District	August 11, 1980 (#80000389)	Vermont Routes 9 and 100; 42°52′09″N 72°52′30″W	Wilmington	
98	Windham Village Historic District	Windham Village Historic District	November 1, 1984 (#84000428)	Town Hill Rd. 43°10′37″N 72°43′38″W	Windham	
99	Worrall Covered Bridge	Worrall Covered Bridge	July 16, 1973 (#73000209)	North of Rockingham across the Williams River; 43°12′42″N 72°32′09″W	Rockingham	
100	Arthur D. and Emma J. Wyatt House	Arthur D. and Emma J. Wyatt House	May 10, 2005 (#05000420)	125 Putney Rd. 42°51′32″N 72°33′30″W	Brattleboro	

== See also ==
- List of National Historic Landmarks in Vermont
- National Register of Historic Places listings in Vermont
