= Fryeburg Public Library =

- District No. 1 Schoolhouse
- U.S. National Register of Historic Places
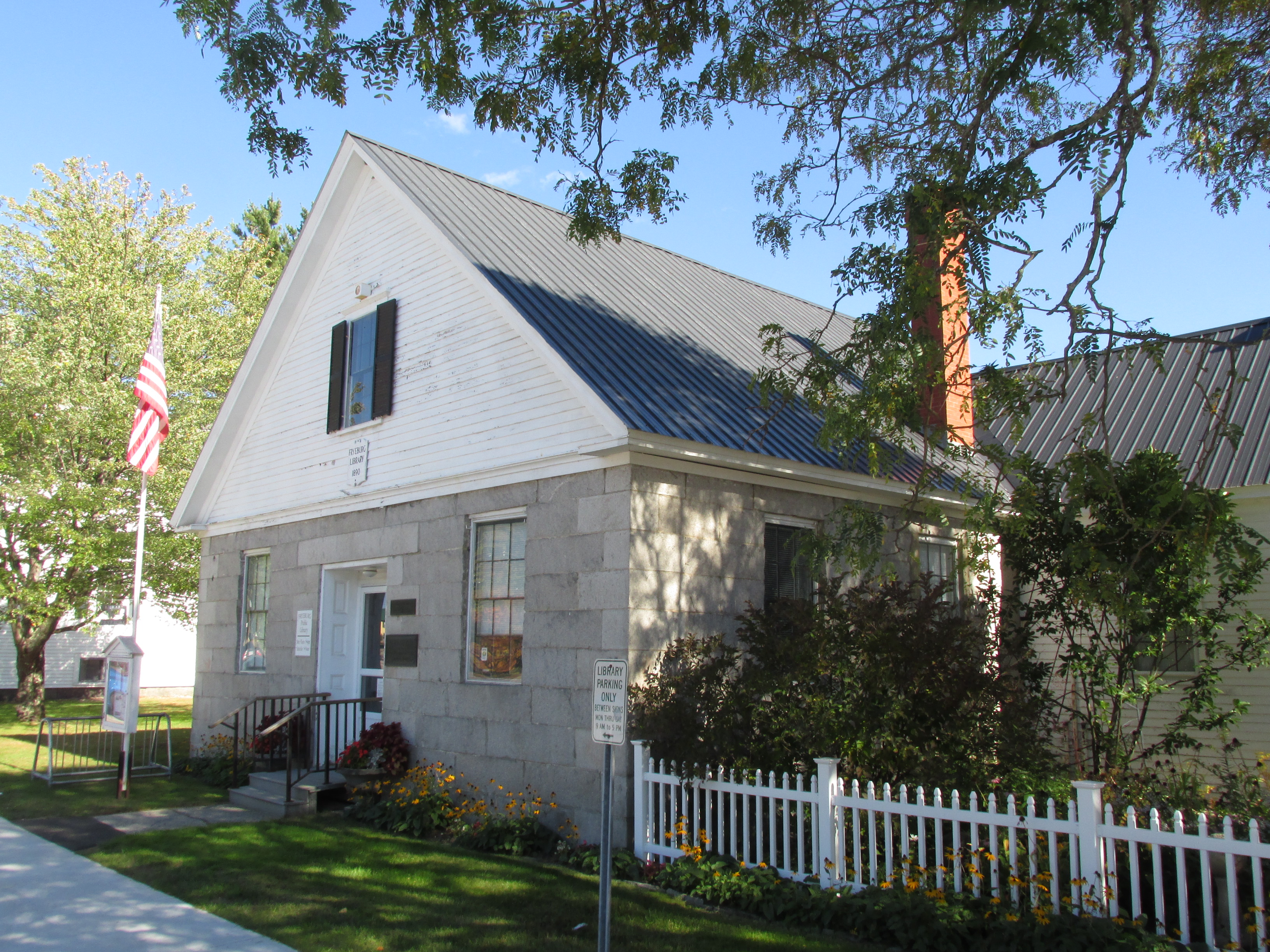

- Location within Maine Location within the United States
- Location: 515 Main St., Fryeburg, Maine
- Coordinates: 44°0′54″N 70°58′57″W
- Area: 0.3 acres (0.12 ha)
- Built: 1832
- Built by: Arnold Floyd
- NRHP reference No.: 84001466
- Added to NRHP: July 19, 1984

The Public Library of Fryeburg, Maine is located at 515 Main Street. The library is located in a stone building, which was built in 1832 as the District No. 1 Schoolhouse, and is one of only two known 19th-century stone schoolhouses in the state. It was listed on the National Register of Historic Places in 1984.

== Description and history ==
The main block of the library is a 1 1/2-story structure, whose first level is built of ten courses of ashlar granite blocks. The gable ends of upper half-story are clad in clapboards. The main entrance faces west in a recessed, paneled doorway. Two wood-frame ells extend north and south from the rear portion of the building, giving it a T shape. One of these wings, added in 1957, was donated by Clarence E. Mulford, the noted author of Hopalong Cassidy and other western novels, and now contains memorabilia related to him. The other was added on 1973, and extends the building from where there was originally a secondary entrance. Its construction was funded by John Weston, and houses the town's local history collection.

The schoolhouse was built in 1832, and was, at the time of its listing on the National Register of Historic Places in 1984, one of only two known surviving 19th-century stone schoolhouses in the state, and by far the best-preserved. It was used by the town until the construction of another school in 1903, at which time is given to the Fryeburg Women's Library Club, which had been founded in 1890 to maintain a library collection for the village. The library is now owned and maintained by the town.

== See also ==
- National Register of Historic Places listings in Oxford County, Maine
