= Crows Nest (Wilmington, Vermont) =

- U.S. National Register of Historic Places
- U.S. Historic district
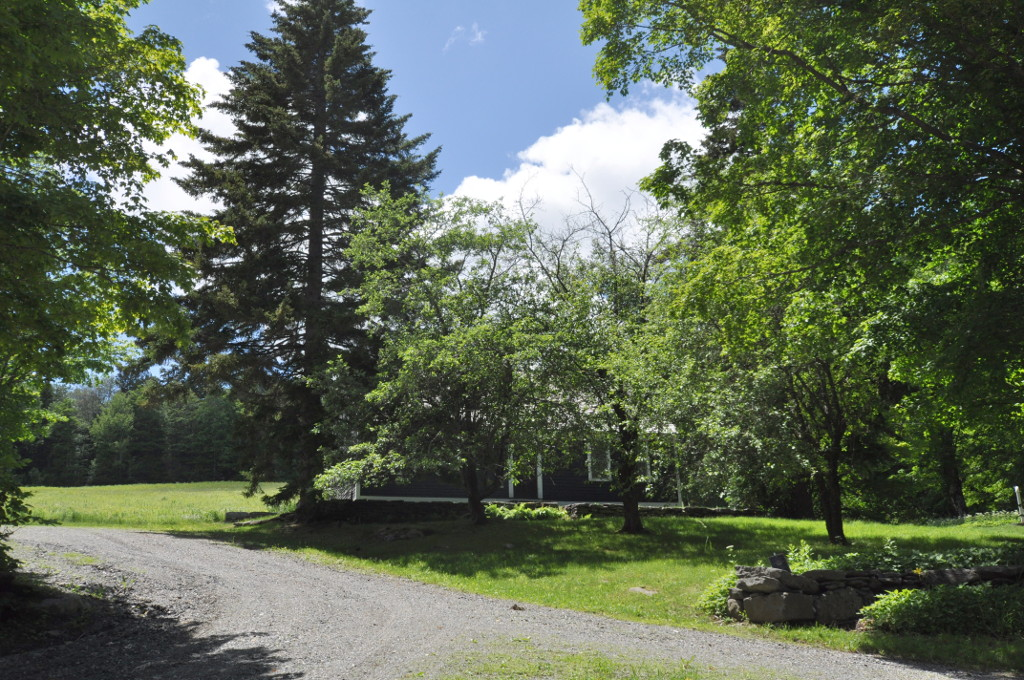

- Location within Vermont Location within the United States
- Location: 36 Sturgis Dr., Wilmington, Vermont
- Coordinates: 42°54′43″N 72°53′1″W
- Area: 75 acres (30 ha)
- Built: 1803
- Architectural style: Cape Cod, Colonial Revival
- NRHP reference No.: 98000431
- Added to NRHP: May 18, 1998

The Crows Nest is a historic farmstead property at 35 Sturgis Drive in Wilmington, Vermont. The 75-acre (30 ha) property includes rolling woods and a hay meadow, and a small cluster of farm outbuildings near the main house, a c. 1803 Cape style building. The property typifies early Vermont farmsteads, and is now protected by a preservation easement. It was listed on the National Register of Historic Places in 1998.

== Description and history ==
The Crows Nest is located on the west side of Sturgis Drive in northwestern Wilmington. Sturgis Drive is a former alignment of nearby Coldbrook Road, the principal road from the village center to its northwest. The farmstead originally consisted of 100 acres (40 ha), including land as far north as the current alignment of Coldbrook Road and as far east as Mann Road, which has been sold off for development. The remaining portions of the original farmstead now consist of 75 acres, most of which has been allowed to revert to woodland, and a roughly rectangular hay meadow above the farmstead complex, which now consists of just the original farmhouse and a modern barn.

The farmhouse is a modest 1-1/2 story timber frame structure, five bays wide, with a side gable roof, central chimney, clapboard siding, and a rubble stone foundation that also includes some bedrock. A single-story ell extends to the rear of the right corner, and a shed-roof dormer extends across much of the back. The interior has a mix of original and Colonial Revival reproduction materials, the result of a 1925 restoration of the property. Original features appear to include wide pine floors and a Federal period fireplace surround.

The 100-acre property was purchased in 1801 by Perley Barlett, and it is believed that he built the house, as the land was previously in the hands of absentee owners, and later records describe a farm on the land. The construction methods and architectural style of the house are consistent with an early 19th-century construction date. The property was used by a variety of owners as a farm until 1925, when it was converted to a vacation property. At that time, the property included two 19th-century barns on the far side of Sturgis Drive, which still stood when the property was listed on the National Register in 1998; they have since been torn down. Kate Sturgis, who did the conversion and restoration of the property, sold property to the town for the realignment of Coldbrook Road, and sold off additional parcels for the construction of residences along Coldbrook Road and Sturgis Drive.

== See also ==
- National Register of Historic Places listings in Windham County, Vermont
