= Canal Street Schoolhouse =

- U.S. National Register of Historic Places
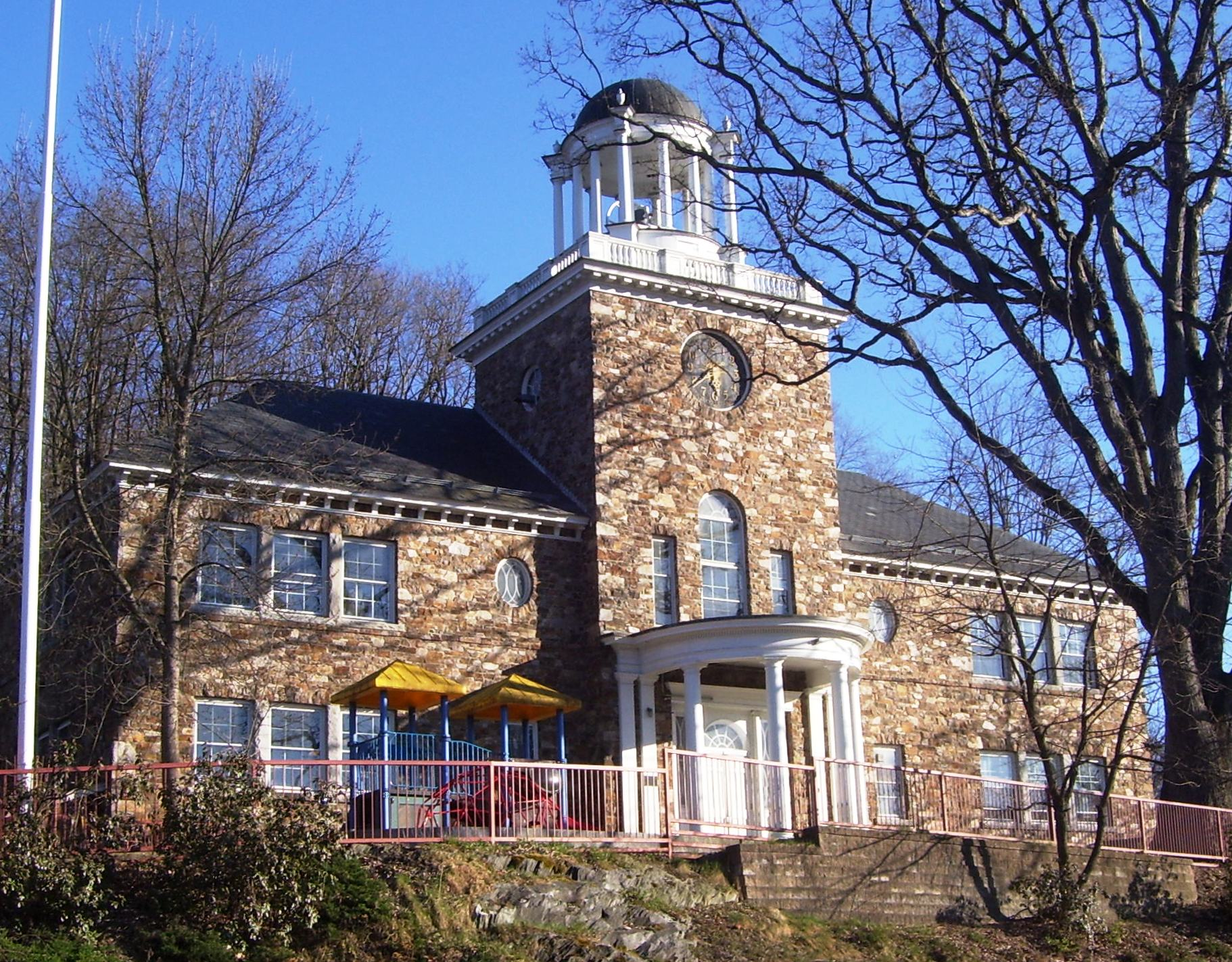

- Location within Vermont Location within the United States
- Location: Canal St., Brattleboro, Vermont
- Coordinates: 42°51′1″N 72°33′29″W
- Area: 1 acre (0.40 ha)
- Built: 1892
- Built by: Pellett Brothers
- Architect: McKim, Mead & White
- Architectural style: Colonial Revival
- NRHP reference No.: 77000103
- Added to NRHP: August 19, 1977

The Canal Street Schoolhouse is a historic school building on Canal Street in Brattleboro, Vermont. Built in 1892 out of locally quarried stone, it is a fine local example of Colonial Revival architecture. It was listed on the National Register of Historic Places in 1977.

== Description and history ==
The Canal Street Schoolhouse stands southwest of downtown Brattleboro, on a rise above the south side of Canal Street (United States Route 5), a major thoroughfare. It is a two-story stone structure, topped by a hip roof and set on a stone foundation. Its front half is nearly bisected by a projecting square tower, which is capped by an open octagonal belfry and cupola. The main facade, facing Canal Street, is symmetrical, with the main entrance in the tower base, flanked by sidelight windows, and sheltered by a semicircular portico supported by Doric columns. Above the entrance are windows arranged in Palladian fashion, the three sections each set in separate openings. A circular clock face is set on the tower's third stage, which is surmounted by a low balustrade and the belfry. The tower is flanked by single sash windows on the first floor and oval windows on the second, with bands of three sash windows at the outermost bays.

The school was built in 1892, and is notable for its Colonial Revival styling, executed in local stone instead of the more typical brick. A design submitted by New York City architects McKim, Mead & White was accepted. William Rutherford Mead, one of the senior partners of the firm, was a native of Brattleboro. An elevation of the building, credited to them, was published in the September 16, 1892, issue of the Vermont Phoenix, the local newspaper. With Interest (1925), a booklet about the town published by the Vermont Peoples National Bank, credited the design to artist Robert Gordon Hardie, who like Mead was a Brattleboro native. As the design of the building is verifiably by McKim, Mead & White, it is unknown what role Hardie may have had in the project.

The clock was paid for by a local fundraising effort, and the bell was cast by the Meneely Bell Foundry of Troy, New York and installed in 1893. At the time of its listing on the National Register in 1977, it was the only known operable school bell in the state.

== See also ==
- National Register of Historic Places listings in Windham County, Vermont
