= Crowsnest Provincial Park =

Provincial park in British Columbia

- IUCN category II (national park)
- Location within British Columbia
- Interactive map of Crowsnest Provincial Park
- Location: Kootenay Land District, British Columbia, Canada
- Nearest city: Sparwood, BC
- Coordinates: 49°39′06″N 114°41′56″W
- Area: 46 ha (110 acres)
- Established: November 8, 1960
- Governing body: BC Parks

Crowsnest Provincial Park is a provincial park in British Columbia, Canada, located within the District Municipality of Sparwood, 51 km (32 mi) east of Fernie on BC Highway 3, just inside the BC side of the Crowsnest Pass.
