= Crows Nest Point =

Coordinates: 38.3523°N 77.3064°W

Crows Nest Point is a cape in Stafford County, in the U.S. state of Virginia.

Crows Nest Point was named after a black boat that was regularly harbored there in the 19th century.
