= District No. 1 Schoolhouse (Somerset, Vermont) =

- U.S. National Register of Historic Places
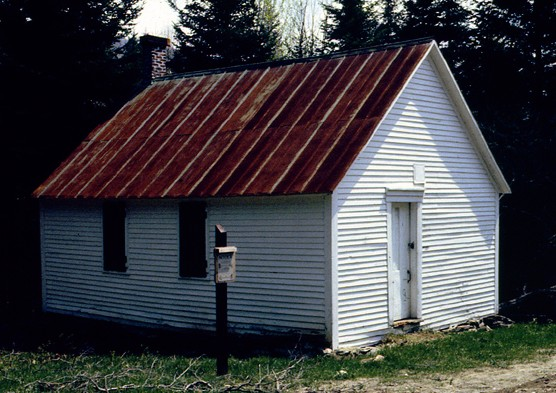
- Undated Forest Service photo

- Location within Vermont Location within the United States
- Location: Somerset Rd., Somerset, Vermont
- Coordinates: 42°57′40″N 72°59′2″W
- Area: 0.3 acres (0.12 ha)
- Built: 1850
- Architectural style: One-room schoolhouse
- NRHP reference No.: 92000337
- Added to NRHP: April 20, 1992

The District No. 1 Schoolhouse is a historic one-room schoolhouse on Somerset Road in Somerset, Vermont, United States. Built about 1850, it is the only known entirely unaltered district schoolhouse in the state, and is probably the only surviving municipal building from the tiny community, which was disincorporated in 1937. The building was listed on the National Register of Historic Places in 1992.

== Description and history ==
The former town of Somerset is located in western Windham County, high in the Green Mountains. It is north of Searsburg, with its principal thoroughfare, Somerset Road, running north from Vermont Route 9 up the Deerfield River valley. The schoolhouse is located on the east side of this road in a small clearing, well north of the road's crossing of the river, and of the town cemetery. The building is a small rectangular wood-frame structure, its gable roof perpendicular to the road. Its walls are finished in wooden clapboards, and the street-facing facade has an off-center door as its only significant element. The other sides of the building have simple sash windows with plain surrounds and vertical-board shutters. The building is set on 20th-century poured concrete piers, which are obscured by fieldstones placed around them. The interior consists of an entry area that includes a small cloakroom and an area that was probably used to store firewood, with most of the building taken up by the classroom. It is finished in wainscoting and plaster. At the time of the building's National Register listing, its interior was in a half-restored state, the result of an incomplete 1964 restoration attempt.

When this school was built about 1850, the town's population was about 300, and most lived in a narrow strip of arable land on the east side of Mount Snow, that in 1869 became part of neighboring Dover. The school building survived Vermont's call for improved standards in schools in 1904 without any alteration, and was never fitted with electricity or plumbing. The town population suffered a significant decline in the early 20th century, due in part to the construction of Somerset Reservoir, and was disincorporated by the state in 1937. The school was probably closed in 1930; at that time the town had a population of 20. The building is now owned by the United States Forest Service, and is, like much of the former town, part of the Green Mountain National Forest.

== See also ==
- National Register of Historic Places listings in Windham County, Vermont
