= Vermont Route 121 =

State highway in Windham County, Vermont, US

Vermont Route 121
- Map of Windham County in southeastern Vermont with VT 121 highlighted in red

Route information
- Maintained by towns of Londonderry, Windham, Grafton, Rockingham, and Westminster
- Length: 21.439 mi (34.503 km)

Major junctions
- West end: VT 11 in Londonderry
- East end: US 5 in Bellows Falls

Location
- Country: United States
- State: Vermont
- Counties: Windham

Highway system
- State highways in Vermont
← VT 120	→ VT 122

Vermont Route 121 (VT 121) is a state highway in the U.S. state of Vermont. The highway runs 21.439 miles (34.503 km) from VT 11 in Londonderry east to U.S. Route 5 (US 5) in the incorporated village of Bellows Falls in the town of Rockingham. VT 121 follows the Saxtons River in northern Windham County. The highway has a pair of gravel sections in the towns of Windham and Grafton.

== Route description ==
VT 121 begins at an intersection with VT 11 in the hamlet of North Windham in the town of Londonderry. The highway heads south and follows the Middle Branch Williams River into its headwaters in the town of Windham. VT 121 curves east and enters the valley of the Saxtons River at the hamlet of Lawrence Four Corners. There, at its intersection with Hitchcock Hill Road and Windham Hill Road, the highway continues as a gravel road, which crosses the river four times before it enters the town of Grafton as Houghtonville Road. VT 121 becomes paved again west of the Houghtonville Historic District in the namesake village. East of Houghtonville, the highway becomes gravel again, curves south with the river, and crosses it three times, and passes to the east of the Middletown Rural Historic District and the constituent Park Farm. West of Hinkley Brook, VT 121 becomes paved again, and the highway veers onto Main Street in the Grafton Village Historic District. The well-preserved village includes the Butterfield House, the Milldean and Alexander-Davis House, the Grafton Congregational Church and Chapel, the Grafton Post Office, and Grafton District Schoolhouse No. 2. VT 121 meets the north end of Kidder Hill Road, which leads to the Kidder Covered Bridge, crosses the Saxtons River, and intersects VT 35 (Chester Road).

VT 121 and VT 35 run concurrently east from the village center along the Saxtons River. The highways pass through the Mechanicsville Historic District and cross the river three times together. Near the eastern town line, the highway diverge; VT 35 heads south into Athens and VT 121 crosses the river again and enters the town of Rockingham in the hamlet of Cambridgeport along Saxtons River Road. VT 121 passes through the Saxtons River Village Historic District, where the highway crosses the river again. The highway continues southeast past the Hall Covered Bridge into the town of Westminster, where the route passes under Interstate 91, crosses the river for the last time, and serves the hamlet of North Westminster. VT 121 re-enters Rockingham in the incorporated village of Bellows Falls. The highway follows Old Terrace through the Bellows Falls Neighborhood Historic District to its eastern terminus at a four-legged intersection with US 5. The U.S. Highway heads south along Westminster Street and north along Atkinson Street; the east leg of the junction is Westminster Street, which heads into the Bellows Falls Downtown Historic District.

The five towns through which VT 121 passes maintain the state-numbered highway.

== Major intersections ==
The entire route is in Windham County.

Location	mi	km	Destinations	Notes
Londonderry	0.000	0.000	VT 11 – Londonderry, Chester	Western terminus
Grafton	9.950	16.013	VT 35 north (Chester Road) – Chester	Western end of concurrency with VT 35
Grafton	13.830	22.257	VT 35 south – Athens, Townshend	Eastern end of concurrency with VT 35
Bellows Falls	21.439	34.503	US 5 (Westminster Street/Atkinson Street) to I-91 / Westminster Street north	Eastern terminus
1.000 mi = 1.609 km; 1.000 km = 0.621 mi: Concurrency terminus
