= Mechanicsville Historic District (Grafton, Vermont) =

Historic district in Vermont, United States

- U.S. National Register of Historic Places
- U.S. Historic district
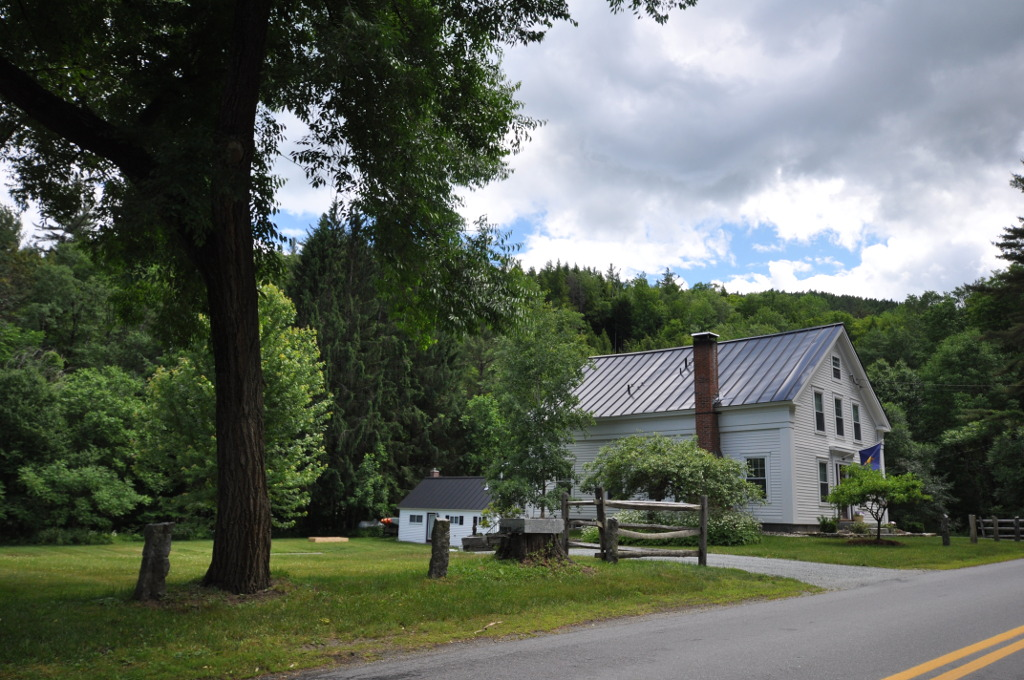

- Location within Vermont Location within the United States
- Location: Vermont Route 121 E., Grafton, Vermont
- Coordinates: 43°10′13″N 72°35′57″W
- Area: 56 acres (23 ha)
- Architectural style: Federal, Greek Revival, Italianate, Vernacular
- NRHP reference No.: 10000766
- Added to NRHP: September 16, 2010

The Mechanicsville Historic District encompasses a cluster of residential properties that are all that remain of one of the early industrial areas of Grafton, Vermont. Located a short way east of Grafton Village on Vermont Route 121, it includes ten well-preserved 19th-century properties, some located on properties where early mills once stood. The district was listed on the National Register of Historic Places in 2010.

== Description and history ==
The area that is now Grafton was first chartered in 1754, but only began to see permanent settlement in the late 1770s, in the town's Middletown section. Grafton Village developed around the confluence of two branches of the Saxtons River, a tributary of the Connecticut River. Mechanicsville, a short way downstream from Grafton Village, was, along with the main village, one of the places where grist and lumber mills were established early in the town's history. Three of its lumber mills (none of which stand anymore) survived into the 20th century, supporting the local economy until the last one closed in the 1960s. The result is a collection of residential structures, mainly from the first half of the 19th century.

The historic district consists of a cluster of twelve houses, ten of which are historical. The seven on the north side of Route 121 are roughly centered opposited the Howland Mill Bridge, while the remaining five are west of the bridge, between the road and river. Most of the houses are set close to the road, and are stylistically vernacular interpretations of Federal and Greek Revival styles, although there is one moderately Italianate house. The two non-contributing properties in the district are a modest 2000s Colonial Revival house, and a 19th-century blacksmith's shop that has been moved and converted into a residence. The contributing c.1850 Pitt Blacksmith Shop/Walker-Watrous House at 516 Rt. 121 East, affectionately known as the “Chipmunk House”, was swept away by Hurricane Irene in 2011 leaving eleven houses remaining within the district, nine of which are historical. A metal guardrail now stands in its place, just west of the Howland Mill Bridge.

== See also ==
- National Register of Historic Places listings in Windham County, Vermont
