= Grafton (CDP), Vermont =

Census-designated place in Vermont, United States

Grafton, Vermont
- Census-designated place
- Location within Vermont Location within the United States
- Coordinates: 43°10′15″N 72°36′31″W
- Country: United States
- State: Vermont
- County: Windham
- Town: Grafton

Area
  - Total: 0.13 sq mi (0.34 km^{2})
  - Land: 0.13 sq mi (0.34 km^{2})
  - Water: 0 sq mi (0.0 km^{2})
- Elevation: 846 ft (258 m)

Population (2020)
  - Total: 49
- Time zone: UTC-5 (Eastern (EST))
  - Summer (DST): UTC-4 (EDT)
- ZIP Code: 05146
- Area code: 802
- FIPS code: 50-28825
- GNIS feature ID: 2807160

Grafton, also known as Grafton Village, is the central village and a census-designated place (CDP) in the town of Grafton, Windham County, Vermont, United States. The Grafton Village Historic District occupies approximately the same area. As of the 2020 census, it had a population of 49, compared to 645 in the entire town.

The CDP is in northern Windham County, southeast of the center of Grafton. It sits in the valley of the Saxtons River, where it is joined by its South Branch. The Saxtons is an east-flowing tributary of the Connecticut River.

Vermont Route 121 serves as Grafton's Main Street. It leads southeast 11 miles (18 km) to Bellows Falls on the Connecticut River and northwest 14 miles (23 km) to Londonderry. Vermont Route 35 (Chester Hill Road) runs north out of Grafton, leading 7 miles (11 km) to Chester. Route 35 joins Route 121 east out of Grafton but later turns south and leads a total of 14 miles (23 km) to Townshend.
