= Houghtonville Historic District =

Historic district in Vermont, United States

- U.S. National Register of Historic Places
- U.S. Historic district
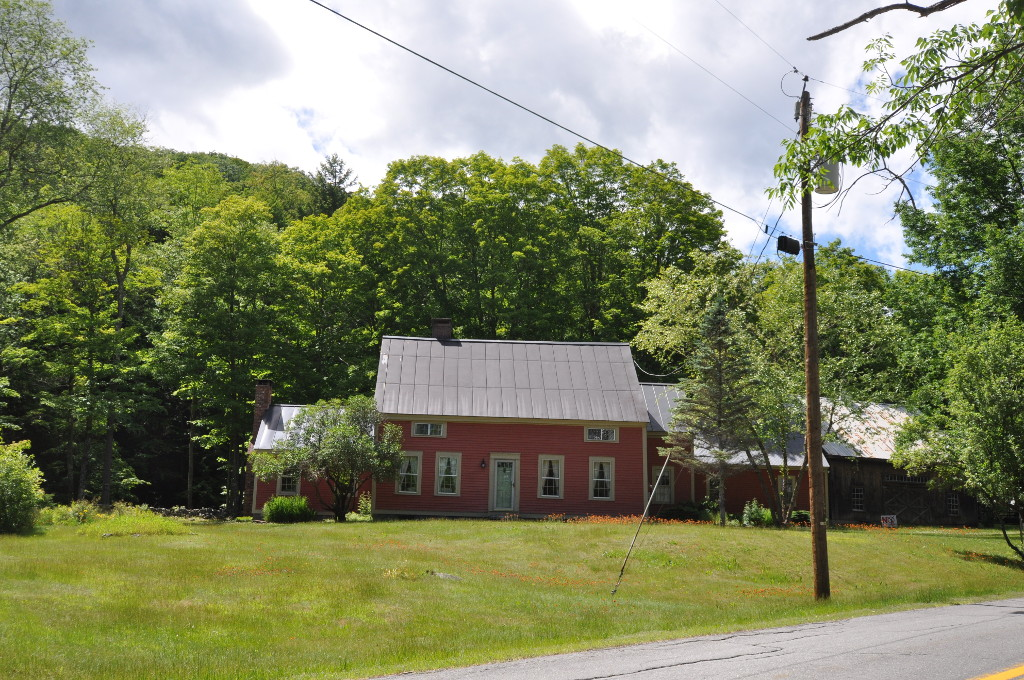

- Location within Vermont Location within the United States
- Location: Houghtonville, Stagecoach & Cabell Rds., Grafton, Vermont
- Coordinates: 43°11′52″N 72°38′51″W
- Area: 218 acres (88 ha)
- NRHP reference No.: 15000583
- Added to NRHP: September 8, 2015

The Houghtonville Historic District encompasses a cluster of residential properties that are all that remain of one of the early industrial areas of Grafton, Vermont. Located west of Grafton Village on Houghtonville Road (Vermont Route 121), it includes ten well-preserved 19th-century houses, some located on properties where early mills once stood. The district was listed on the National Register of Historic Places in 2015.

== Description and history ==
The area that is now Grafton was first chartered in 1754, but it did not begin to see permanent settlement until the late 1770s, specifically in the town's Middletown section. Grafton Village developed around the confluence of two branches of the Saxtons River, a tributary of the Connecticut River. Houghtonville, located about 3 miles (4.8 km) up the North Branch Saxtons River from Grafton Village, developed around a mill and homesteads established on the river by the Houghton family. The mills operated through the 19th century, closing in the early 20th century. The village expanded to include a post office and schoolhouse, both of which are still standing. In the 1910s and 1920s, some of the older houses were rehabilitated for use as summer residences.

The historic district extends westward along Houghtonville Road, from its junction with Cabell Road past the junction with Stagecoach Road. It includes properties a short way up Stagecoach Road, as well as the bridge across the River on Cabell Road, which is an early concrete bridge built about 1921 (or possibly after the New England Hurricane of 1938; there is some disagreement in available documentation). The district includes three large farm properties, whose acreage contributes to the rural feel of the area; most of the other buildings are set on small lots close to the road. Also included are the archaeological remains of two of the mills that once powered the village economy.

== See also ==
- National Register of Historic Places listings in Windham County, Vermont
