= Grafton District Schoolhouse No. 2 =

- U.S. National Register of Historic Places
- U.S. Historic district – Contributing property
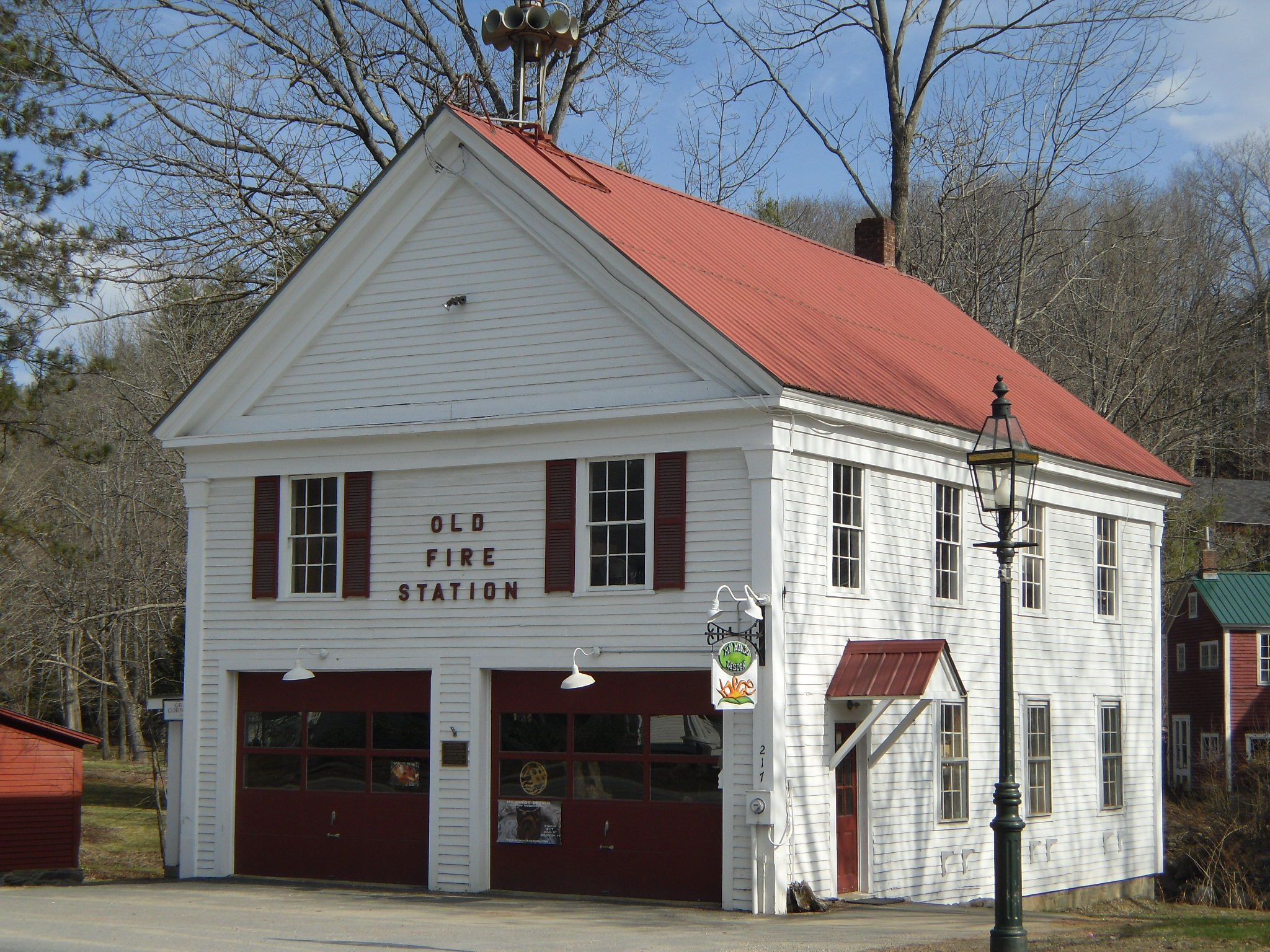

- Location within Vermont Location within the United States
- Location: 217 Main St., Grafton, Vermont
- Coordinates: 43°10′25″N 72°36′24″W
- Area: less than one acre
- Built: 1835
- Architectural style: Greek Revival
- Part of: Grafton Village Historic District (ID10000171)
- MPS: Educational Resources of Vermont MPS
- NRHP reference No.: 05000868

Significant dates
- Added to NRHP: August 11, 2005
- Designated CP: April 7, 2010

The Grafton District Schoolhouse No. 2, also known locally as the Old Fire Station, is a historic civic building at 217 Main Street in Grafton, Vermont. Built about 1835, it has served as a school, fire station, Masonic hall, tin shop, undertaker's shop, and as the clubhouse of a local brass band. Despite some alteration, it is a well-preserved example of a mid-19th century Greek Revival schoolhouse. It was listed on the National Register of Historic Places in 2005.

== Description and history ==
The Graftion District Schoolhouse No. 2 is located on the east side of Grafton village, on the north side of Main Street (Vermont Route 121), just west of its junction with Chester Road (Vermont Route 35). It stands east of the Grafton Post Office, and across the street from the public library, both individually listed on the National Register. The schoolhouse is a two-story wood frame structure, with a front-facing gable roof, clapboard siding, and a fieldstone foundation. The building corners are pilasters, supporting an entablature that encircles the building, and the gable is fully pedimented. The front facade is symmetrical, with two 20th-century overhead doors on the ground floor, and two sash windows above. The side elevations are four bays deep, and there is a pedestrian entrance in the leftmost bay on the right side.

The building's construction date is unknown, and is assumed to be in the 1830s or 1840s based on its Greek Revival character. It is possible that the building's second story is in fact an older (c. 1811) structure, based on architectural evidence. It was used as a school until 1867, after which time it saw a variety of commercial and civic uses, notably as a Masonic lodge, undertaker's shop, and tin shop. In 1922 the Grafton Cornet Band took over the upper level, which it continues to use today. The ground floor was converted into a fire station in 1939, at which time most of the original interior was lost, as were the original entry doors on the main facade. It housed the town's main fire station until 1992, and the ground floor is again used as a retail space. The building is owned and maintained by a local preservation group.

== See also ==
- National Register of Historic Places listings in Windham County, Vermont
