= Grafton Post Office (Grafton, Vermont) =

- U.S. National Register of Historic Places
- U.S. Historic district – Contributing property
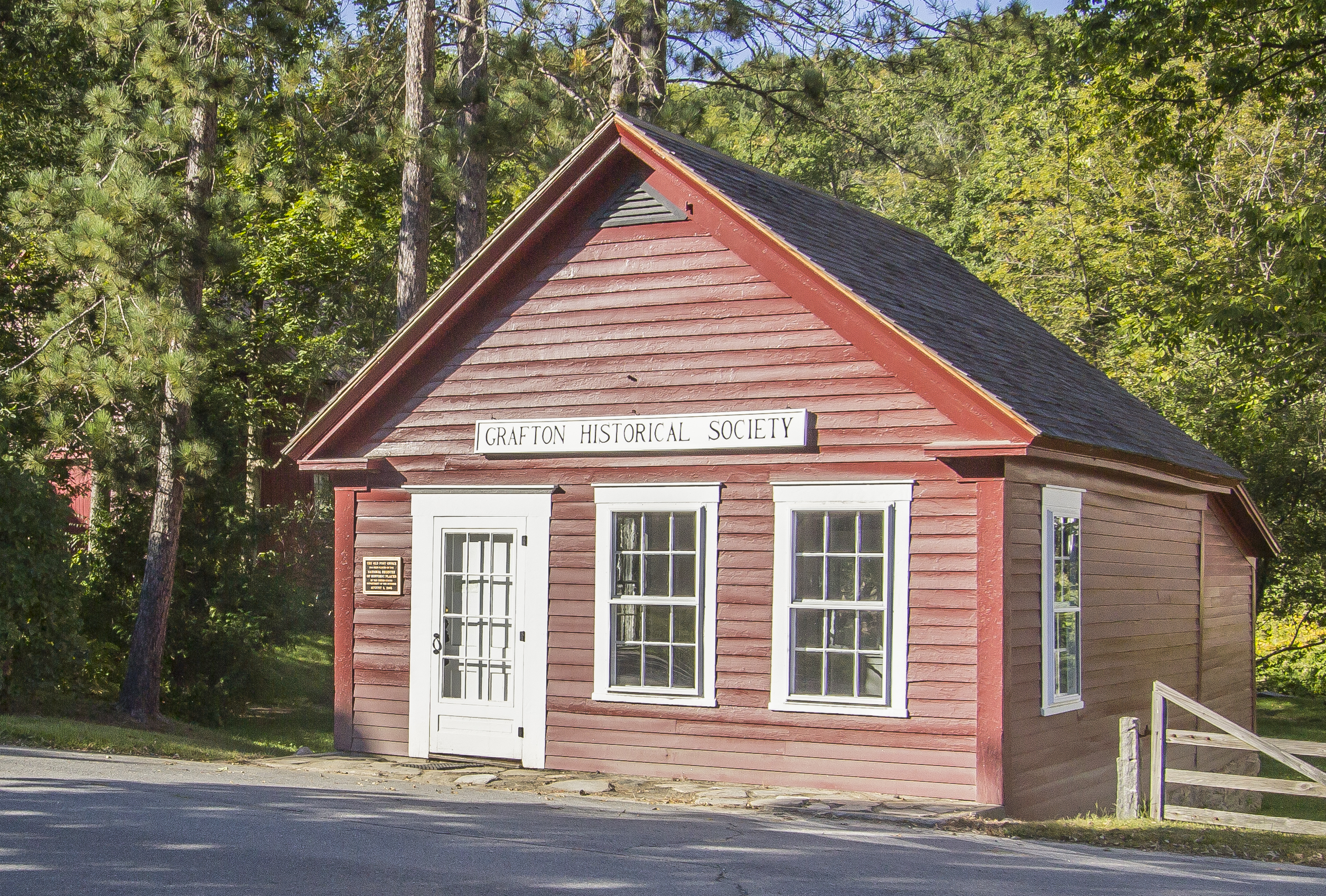

- Location within Vermont Location within the United States
- Location: 205 Main St., Grafton, Vermont
- Coordinates: 43°10′26″N 72°36′25″W
- Area: 0.1 acres (0.040 ha)
- Built: 1855
- Architectural style: Greek Revival
- Part of: Grafton Village Historic District (ID10000171)
- NRHP reference No.: 05000807

Significant dates
- Added to NRHP: August 06, 2005
- Designated CP: April 7, 2010

The Grafton Post Office is a historic former post office building at 205 Main Street in Grafton, Vermont. Built in 1855 in the Greek Revival style, it was the town's post office for over 100 years, and served for a time thereafter as the local historical society museum. It was listed on the National Register of Historic Places in 2005. It is still owned by the historical society, but leased for commercial retail purposes.

== Description and history ==
The former Grafton Post Office is located on the east side of Grafton village, on the north side of Main Street (Vermont Route 121), just west of its junction with Chester Road (Vermont Route 35). It stands west of the former Grafton District Schoolhouse No. 2, and across the street from the public library, both individually listed on the National Register. The post office is a small single-story wood frame structure, with a front-facing gable roof, clapboard siding, and a fieldstone foundation. The main facade is three bays wide, with the entrance in the leftmost bay. Trim consists of simple corner boards and short gable returns. The interior, consisting of a single large room, with two smaller rooms in ells to the rear, has retained only some of its original features.

The post office was built in 1855 for the town's third postmaster, and served in that capacity until 1958. It was lifted off its foundation by flooding occasioned by the Great New England Hurricane of 1938, at which time it was set on its present foundation, a short distance removed from its original location. In 1962 the building was sold to the Grafton Historical Society, which housed its museum there until 1978. The society continues to own the building, leasing it out.

== See also ==
- National Register of Historic Places listings in Windham County, Vermont
