= Old Brick Church (Athens, Vermont) =

Historic church in Vermont, United States

- U.S. National Register of Historic Places
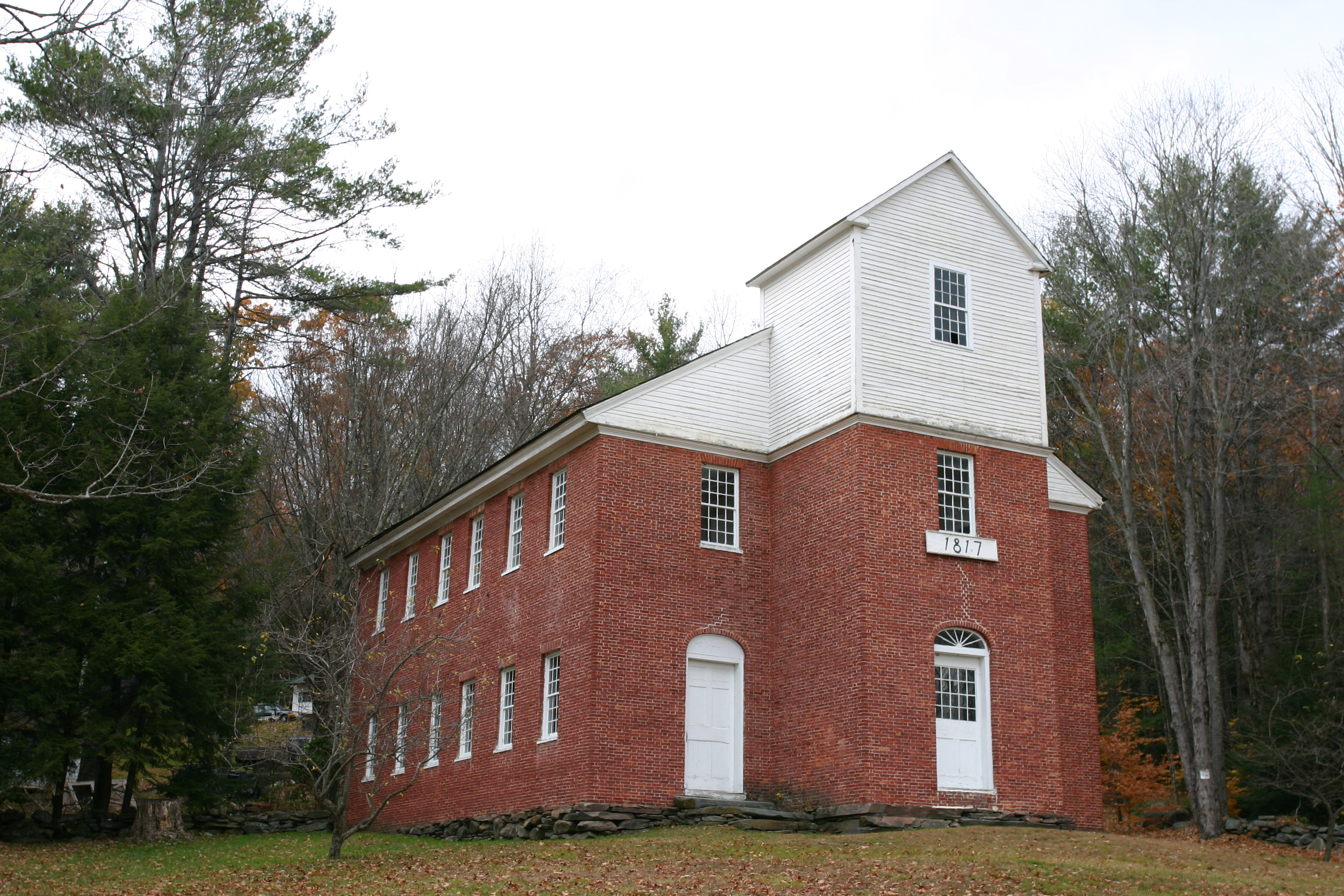

- Location within Vermont Location within the United States
- Location: Off VT 35, Athens, Vermont
- Coordinates: 43°7′23″N 72°34′42″W
- Area: less than one acre
- Built: 1817
- NRHP reference No.: 79000340
- Added to NRHP: November 30, 1979

The Old Brick Church is a historic church building off Vermont Route 35 in Athens, Vermont. Built in 1817, it is a modest Federal style brick structure that served as a church and civic center into the 20th century. Architecturally it represents a transitional period, built with the furnishings (long since removed) of a typical 18th-century New England colonial meeting house, arranged on the long axis as was typical of 19th-century churches. It is now owned by the town, and was listed on the National Register of Historic Places in 1979.

== Description and history ==
The Old Brick Church is located in a rural area of the small town of Athens, southwest of the town center, a short way north of Athens Road (Vermont Route 35) near its junction with Mill Hill Road. It is a 2 1/2-story masonry structure, built primarily of brick, with a wood frame back wall and gable ends sheathed in clapboards. It rests on a rubblestone foundation, and has a square tower projecting from the front. The walls are laid in Flemish bond to the top of the second floor, and there is wood framing above, including in the tower, whose upper exterior levels are clapboarded. The interior, originally a large open chamber with gallery at the rear, now has a full second floor, which was probably added c. 1860 amid other alterations.

The church was built in 1817 by the Methodist Society of Athens, founded in 1801. The society was part of a local circuit of Methodist congregations, and this was the first church built to serve them. When built, the interior included box pews, and a high pulpit with sounding board at the north end of the building. By the late 1850s, the center of Athens had migrated from this area to the northeast, including the construction of a new Methodist church. This building was then altered, removing the box pews and pulpit, and adding the second floor as an assembly hall for town meetings. In 1924 a local organization was formed to maintain the building, but was hampered by funding and only achieved limited repairs. The town formally took over the building in 1951, and continued to use it for town meetings into the 1970s.

== See also ==
- National Register of Historic Places listings in Windham County, Vermont
