= Charles Gould =

Charles Gould may refer to:

- Charles Gould, afterwards Sir Charles Morgan, 1st Baronet (1726–1806), English Judge Advocate-General
- Charles Gould (geologist) (1834–1893), first Geological Surveyor of Tasmania, 1859–1869
- Charles Gilbert Gould (1845–1916), Union Army soldier and Medal of Honor recipient
- Charlie Gould (1847–1917), American baseball player
- Charles A. Gould (1848–1926), American yachtsman and industrialist
- Charles Henry Gould (1855–1919), Canadian librarian and musician
- Charles Gould (1904–1968), American film producer known as Charles K. Feldman
- Charles S. Gould, American film director, see The Great Adventures of Captain Kidd
