= Milldean and Alexander-Davis House =

Historic house in Vermont, United States

- U.S. National Register of Historic Places
- U.S. Historic district – Contributing property
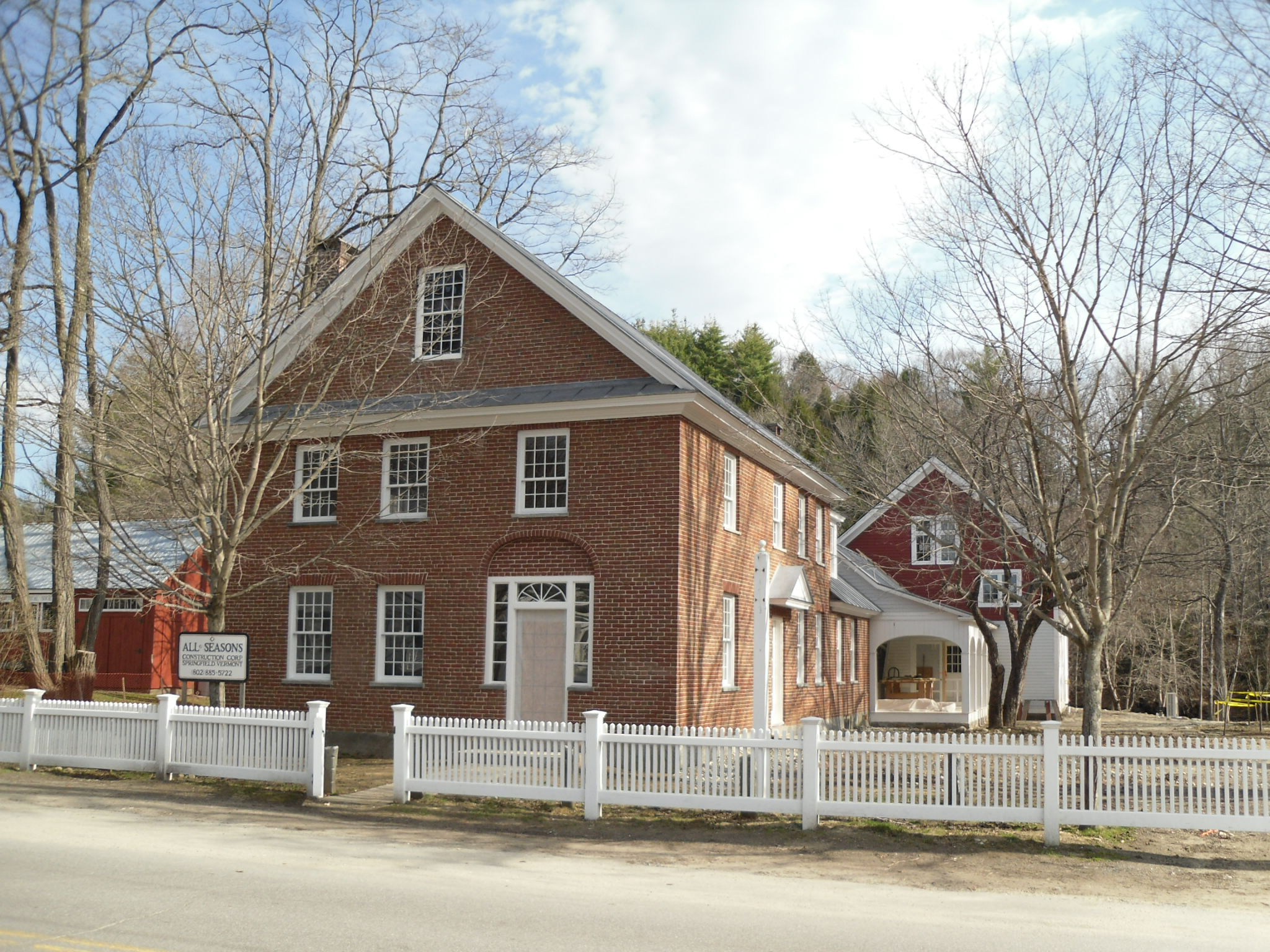
- Milldean

- Location within Vermont Location within the United States
- Location: Main St. near town center, Grafton, Vermont
- Coordinates: 43°10′19″N 72°36′28″W
- Area: 2.7 acres (1.1 ha)
- Built: 1826
- Architectural style: Greek Revival, Federal
- Part of: Grafton Village Historic District (ID10000171)
- NRHP reference No.: 90000815

Significant dates
- Added to NRHP: May 24, 1990
- Designated CP: April 7, 2010

Milldean and the Alexander-Davis House, also known as Eaglebrook and the Eagle Hotel, are a pair of historic houses on Main Street in the village center of Grafton, Vermont. Built c. 1826 and c. 1831, the two houses are statewide rare examples of a transitional Federal-Greek Revival style executed in brick. They are also historically significant for their association with Grafton's textile trade, which was economically important in the mid-19th century. The houses were listed on the National Register of Historic Places in 1990.

== Description and history ==
The Milldean and Alexander-Davis Houses stand in the center of Grafton Village, opposite the Grafton Grocery Market. The two houses each stand with a gable facing the street, and additions extending northward, toward the Saxtons River. They were built for Peter Dean and Lucius Alexander, co-owners of a textile mill that stood on the river bank north of Milldean (the left house of the pair). Both originally presented an early example of the Greek Revival side-hall plan, executed with predominantly Federal details.

=== Alexander-Davis House ===
The Alexander-Davis House was the first of the two houses to be built (c. 1826), and is also the most-altered of the pair. It is now five bays wide, with a two-story front porch, both alterations the result of its conversion in 1840 into a hotel. The original part of the house is the left three bays, whose brick is laid in six-course American bond, while the right two bays are laid in seven-course American bond. The entrance is in what is now the center bay, set in a slightly recessed semi-oval arch, with flanking sidelight windows and a transom below the blind arch. A distinguishing feature of the interior of this house is artwork on its walls that is attributable to the itinerant artist Moses Eaton, Jr.

=== Milldean ===
Milldean was built c. 1831, and was originally nearly identical in appearance to the Alexander-Davis House. It has a three-bay facade, with the entrance in the rightmost bay (as that of the other house would originally have been set), with identical styling. The interior has retained most of its original finish, having undergone some alteration and renovation in the 1980s. Wood-frame ells extend to the rear, connecting the house to a modern carriage barn.

== See also ==
- National Register of Historic Places listings in Windham County, Vermont
