= South Windham =

South Windham may refer to:

- South Windham, Connecticut, a census-designated place in the town of Windham, Connecticut
- South Windham, Maine, a census-designated place in the town of Windham, Maine
- South Windham Village Historic District, in Windham, Vermont
