= Park Farm (Grafton, Vermont) =

- U.S. National Register of Historic Places
- U.S. Historic district – Contributing property
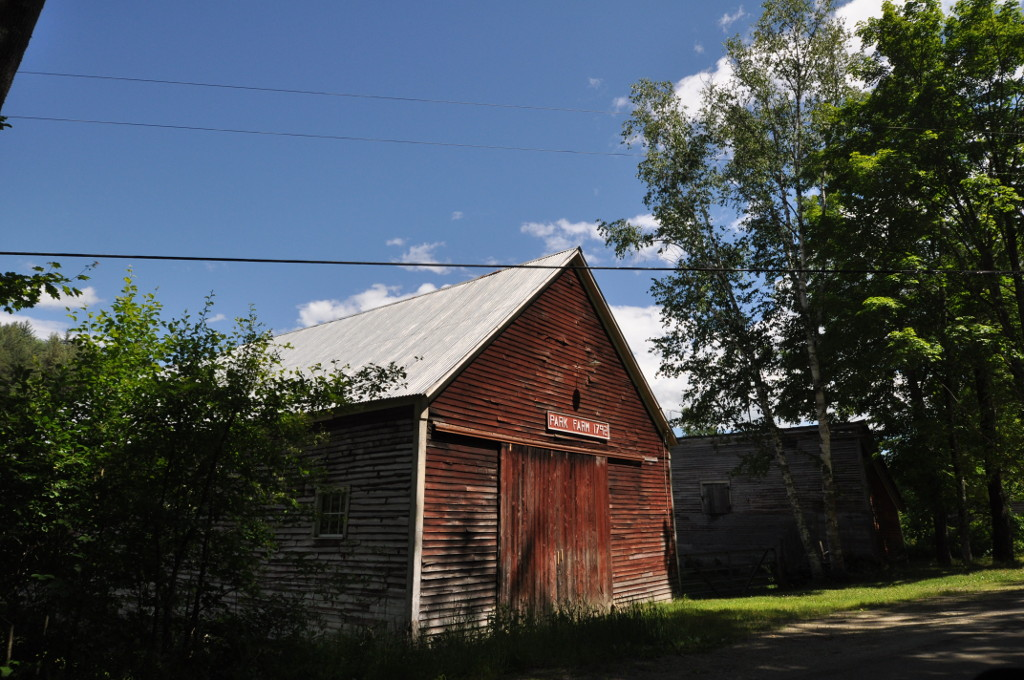

- Location within Vermont Location within the United States
- Location: 26 Woodchuck Hill Rd., Grafton, Vermont
- Coordinates: 43°11′26″N 72°37′31″W
- Area: 65 acres (26 ha)
- Built: 1820
- Architectural style: Federal
- Part of: Middletown Rural Historic District (ID11000101)
- MPS: Agricultural Resources of Vermont MPS
- NRHP reference No.: 03000737

Significant dates
- Added to NRHP: August 4, 2003
- Designated CP: March 21, 2011

Park Farm is a historic farm property at 26 Woodchuck Hill Road in Grafton, Vermont. With a farmhouse dating to about 1820, and most of its outbuildings to the 19th century, the farm remains an excellent example of a typical 19th-century Vermont farmstead. The property was listed on the National Register of Historic Places in 2003.

== Description and history ==
Park Farm is located northwest of Grafton Village, on 65 acres (26 ha) of land on either side of Middletown Road. The farmstead is located at the corner of Woodchuck Hill Road and Middletown Road, not far from the early town center of Grafton, and is part of the Middletown Rural Historic District. It is set amid open fields and an old apple orchard. The main farmhouse is a 1½ story wood frame Cape, built about 1820, to which a number of additions have been made. Outbuildings on the farmstead lie on both sides of Middletown Road, and include a chicken house, several barns, a sheep shed, and an equipment shed. One of the oldest elements of the farm is a c. 1790 spring-fed well, which was probably originally associated with a neighboring property.

The farm is notable for its long association with the local Park family, which acquired the farm in 1842, and has held it for eleven generations, excepting only a brief period outside the family in the 20th century. The farm exhibits a basic pattern of land use and buildings that are typical of the 19th century, when virtually all of its structures were built. The extended Park family historically owned significant amounts of land in the community, and this is the only farm that is still in the hands of its descendants. The farm has fluctuated in size, reaching a maximum size of about 200 acres (81 ha).

== See also ==
- National Register of Historic Places listings in Windham County, Vermont
