= Kidder Covered Bridge =

Covered bridge in Grafton, Vermont

- U.S. National Register of Historic Places
- U.S. Historic district – Contributing property
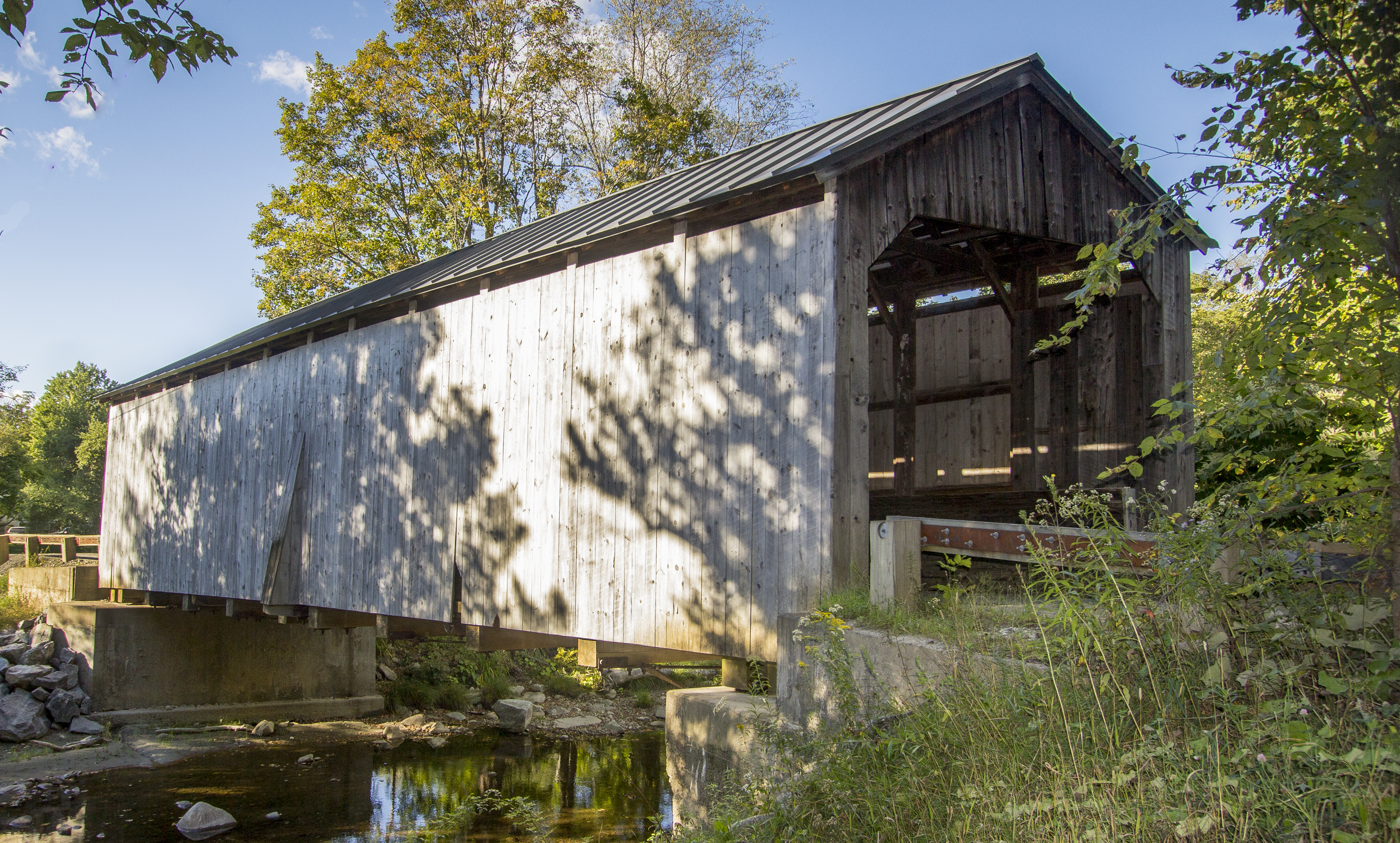

- Location within Vermont Location within the United States
- Location: Kidder Hill Road, Grafton, Vermont
- Coordinates: 43°10′8″N 72°36′21″W
- Area: 1 acre (0.40 ha)
- Built: 1870
- Architectural style: Queenpost through truss
- Part of: Grafton Village Historic District (ID10000171)
- NRHP reference No.: 73000205

Significant dates
- Added to NRHP: July 2, 1973
- Designated CP: April 7, 2010

The Kidder Covered Bridge carries Kidder Hill Road across the South Branch Saxtons River, just south of the village center of Grafton, Vermont. The bridge was built about 1870, and is Grafton's last surviving 19th-century covered bridge. It was rebuilt in 1995. It is the shortest historic covered bridge in Windham County, and was listed on the National Register of Historic Places in 1973.

== Description and history ==
The Kidder Covered Bridge is located about 0.3 miles (0.48 km) south of the center of Grafton Village, on Kidder Hill Road. It is a single-span queenspost truss structure, with a total length of 66 feet (20 m) and a total width of 15 feet (4.6 m), with a roadway 12 feet (3.7 m) wide. It rests on abutments of stone that have been reinforced with concrete. The bridge is oriented at a skew to the river bed, with its trusses forming a parallelogram, 15° off rectangular. The exterior of the trusses is sheathed in vertical board siding, and it is covered by a metal roof. The siding is extended to the portals and gables, and a short way into the portal.

The original covered bridge was constructed circa 1870, and was the town's last 19th-century bridge until it was rebuilt in 1995. It is the county's only example of a queenspost truss bridge, and is one of a handful of covered bridges in the state built with a skew.

The bridge was replaced with a new wooden (covered) structure in April 1995.

== See also ==
- National Register of Historic Places listings in Windham County, Vermont
- List of bridges on the National Register of Historic Places in Vermont
- List of Vermont covered bridges
