= C. W. Deane =

American politician (1837–1914)

Member of the Michigan House of Representatives
- In office 1867–1868

Personal details
- Born: Charles Werden Deane; September 17, 1837 Grafton, Vermont, U.S.
- Died: June 4, 1914 (aged 76) Antigo, Wisconsin, U.S.
- Party: Republican
- Spouse: Adele C. Woodward
- Education: Albany Law School
- Profession: Politician, lawyer

Military service
- Allegiance: Union Army
- Rank: Major
- Battles/wars: American Civil War

Charles Werden Deane (September 17, 1837 – June 4, 1914) was a member of the Michigan House of Representatives.

Deane was born Charles Werden Deane on September 17, 1837 in Grafton, Vermont. Deane went to the Albany Law School and was admitted to the New York and Vermont bars. In 1860, Deane moved to Oceana County, Michigan and was admitted to the Michigan bar. He married Adele C. Woodward and attain the rank of major in the Union Army during the American Civil War. In 1867, Deane served as the village president of Pentwater, Michigan. In 1869, he moved to Chicago, Illinois and was admitted to the Illinois bar. He was involved in the abstract business in Langlade County, Wisconsin and was admitted to the Wisconsin bar. Dean died on June 4, 1914, in Antigo, Wisconsin.

== Political career ==
Deane was a member of the House of Representatives from 1867 to 1868. He was a Republican.
