= VT11 =

VT11 may refer to:

- Polikarpov VT-11, a Soviet fighter aircraft prototype
- Torpedo Squadron Eleven, a unit of the United States Navy
- Vermont Route 11
- VT11, a vector graphics terminal containing a PDP-11 processor
