= Middletown Rural Historic District =

Historic district in Vermont, United States

- U.S. National Register of Historic Places
- U.S. Historic district
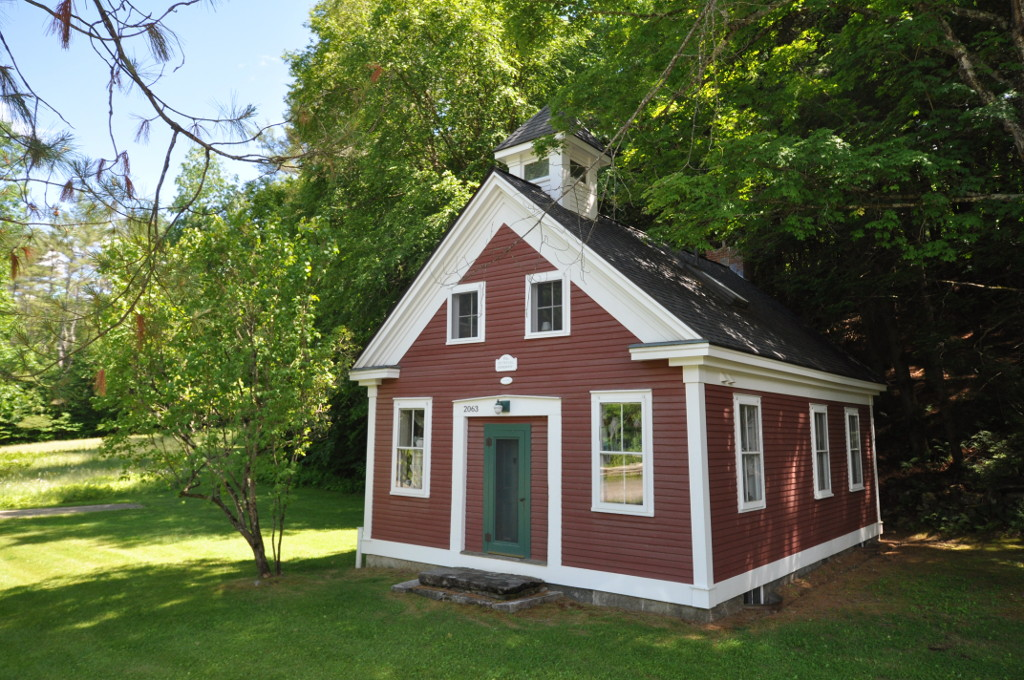
- Pettengill School

- Location within Vermont Location within the United States
- Location: Middletown Rd., Avery Park Dr., Middletown Cemetery Rd., Woodchuck Hill Rd., Vermont Route 121, Grafton, Vermont
- Coordinates: 43°11′18″N 72°37′25″W
- Area: 722 acres (292 ha)
- Architectural style: Federal, Greek Revival, Italianate, Vernacular
- NRHP reference No.: 11000101
- Added to NRHP: March 21, 2011

The Middletown Rural Historic District encompasses an area that was once the town center of Grafton, Vermont. Located northwest of Grafton Village along Middletown Road and adjacent roads, it includes nine well-preserved 19th-century properties, as well as the town's first cemetery and animal pound. The district was listed on the National Register of Historic Places in 2011.

== Description and history ==
The area that is now Grafton was first chartered in 1754, but only began to see permanent settlement in the late 1770s. The town's first civic center was located on a hill near the geographic center of town, which is now at the center of the Middletown Rural Historic District. This area would by 1830 be economically eclipsed by Grafton Village and other areas along the Saxtons River. The area is now largely rural, with a small cluster of buildings at the corner of Middletown and Woodchuck Hill Road.

The district extends along most of the length of Middletown Road, between Grafton Village and its northern end at Vermont Route 121. Several dead-end spur roads radiate from Middletown Road, which also have contributing properties. The oldest resources in the district are the cemetery and the Hall House, both dating to about 1790. Most of the houses in the district are wood-frame structures, in either Federal or Greek Revival style, with three examples of brick construction. The old town pound, its stone walls dating to about 1808, is near the cemetery, and an 1856 schoolhouse stands at the junction of Middletown Road with Route 121, marking the northernmost end of the district.

== See also ==
- Park Farm
- National Register of Historic Places listings in Windham County, Vermont
