= Grafton Village Cheese Company =

Cheesemaker in Vermont, United States

Coordinates: 43°10′18.9″N 72°36′33.6″W

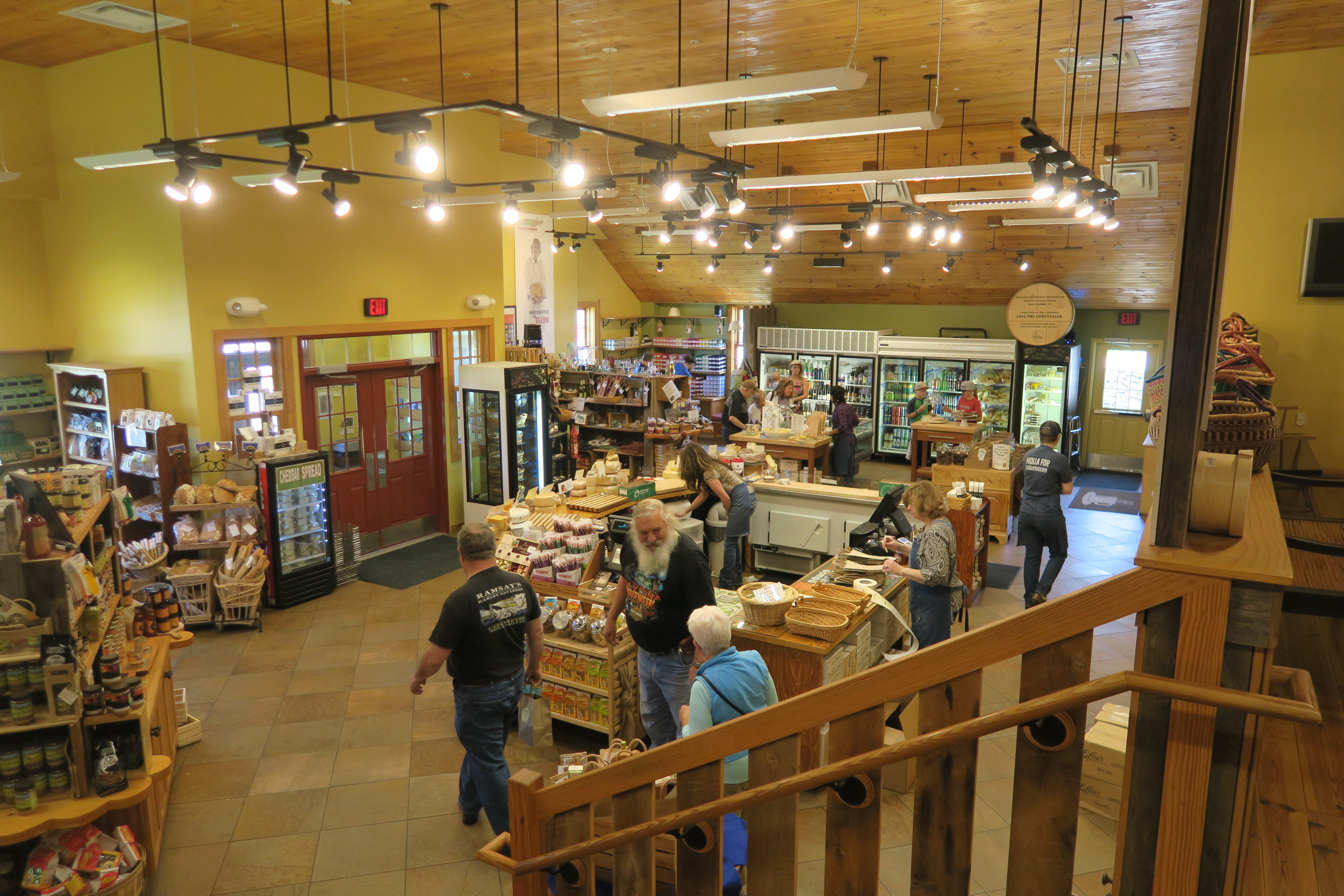
Retail Store in Brattleboro

Grafton Village Cheese Company is a cheesemaker in the town of Grafton in the U.S. state of Vermont. The company produces hand-crafted aged cheddar cheese.

== History ==
The company is the successor to the 1892 Grafton Cooperative Cheese Company, which was founded to handle surplus local milk. The original company went out of business due to a fire. It was restored in the mid-1960s with help from the Windham Foundation, a nonprofit organization whose mission is to "preserve the vitality of Vermont's rural communities". Grafton's cheddar is synthetic-hormone-free and made mostly from Jersey cow milk from Vermont family farms. The most common cheese offered by the Grafton Cheese is their block cheddar, made in 40 pound blocks and then cut to different sales sizes.

In July 2008 the company celebrated the opening of a new production plant and retail store in Brattleboro. The shop is "a 2,500-square-foot classic barn-like structure encompassing a full-service artisanal cheese shop" offering "more than 70 types of cheeses, wine, Vermont microbrews, fresh bread, maple products and other gourmet food items and accompaniments."

In 2014, the Grafton Spring Brook Milk Cheese won the "Best USA Cheese trophy" at the 2014 International Cheese Awards.

== See also ==
- List of food companies
