= Grafton Congregational Church and Chapel =

Historic church in Vermont, United States

- U.S. National Register of Historic Places
- U.S. Historic district – Contributing property
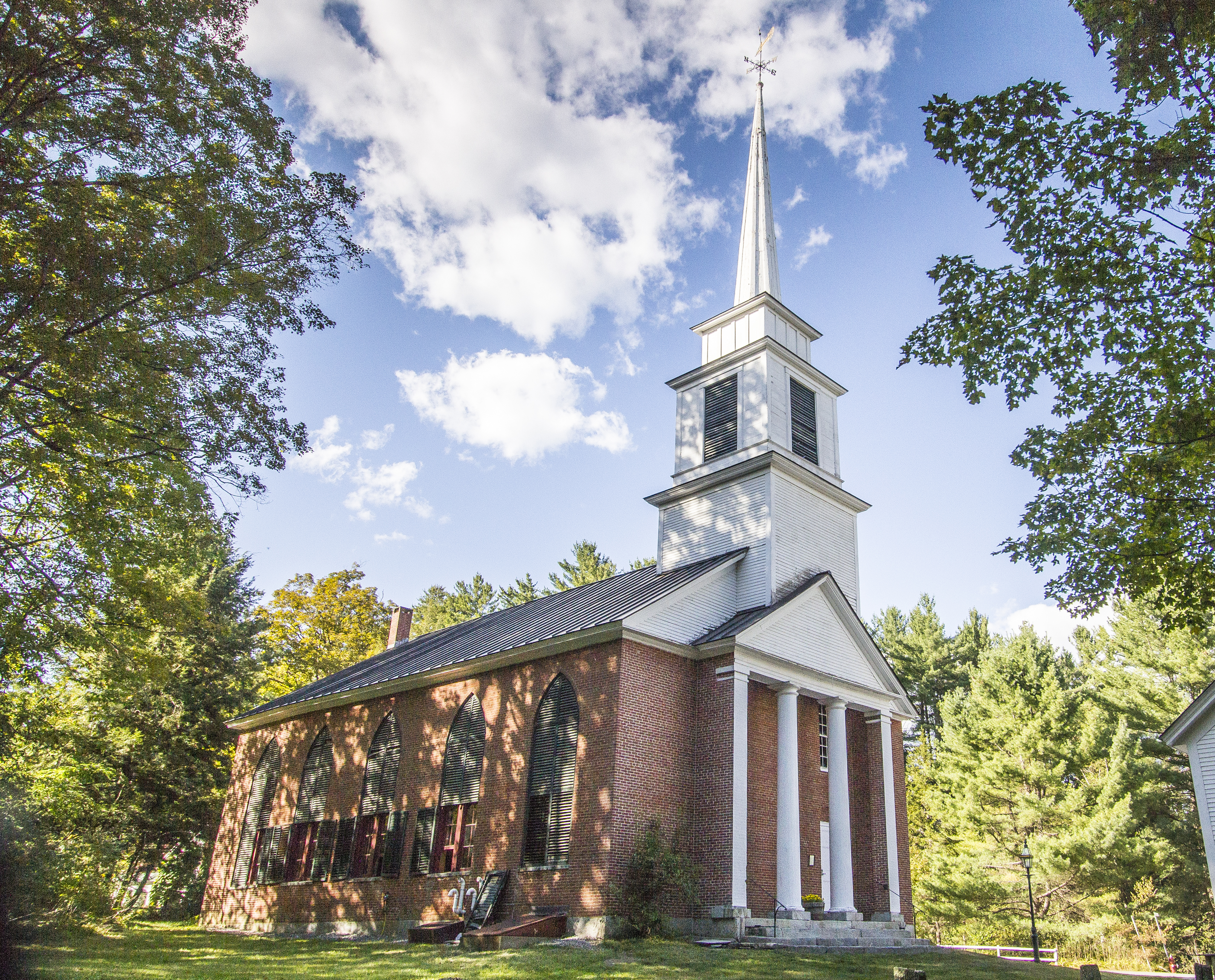

- Location within Vermont Location within the United States
- Location: Main St., Grafton, Vermont
- Coordinates: 43°10′24″N 72°36′42″W
- Area: 1 acre (0.40 ha)
- Built: 1833
- Architectural style: Greek Revival, Gothic Revival
- Part of: Grafton Village Historic District (ID10000171)
- NRHP reference No.: 79000230

Significant dates
- Added to NRHP: December 10, 1979
- Designated CP: April 7, 2010

The Grafton Congregational Church, known locally as The Brick Church, is a historic church on Main Street in Grafton, Vermont. Built in 1833, it is a fine local example of vernacular Greek Revival and Gothic Revival religious architecture. It was listed on the National Register of Historic Places in 1979. Grafton's current Congregationalist (United Church of Christ) congregation now meets primarily in the "White Church" at 55 Main Street.

== Description and history ==
The Grafton Congregational Church is located on the west side of Grafton village, at the junction of Main Street with Hinkley Brook and Middletown Roads. It is a two-story masonry structure, built out of brick laid in common bond with headers every tenth row. It has a gabled roof, and a projecting gabled portico supported by antas (projecting pilasters) at the corners and round wooden columns at the center. The bases of these structures are soapstone. Windows on the building sides are topped by lancet-arched louvers, and a three-stage square tower rises from above the entrance area to a paneled octagonal spire.

The church was built in 1833 for the town's first congregation, organized in 1785, and was dedicated the following year. In 1859-62 the building was enlarged to accommodate increased membership, at which time its Gothic features were probably added. Despite a decline in the town's population, the church again grew with the construction of chapel (sometime between 1867 and 1883), which stands in front of (left, when facing from the street) the main building. The congregation united with the local Baptists in 1920 as an economic measure. As of the property's listing on the National Register in 1979, the combined congregations continued to share two buildings.

== See also ==
- National Register of Historic Places listings in Windham County, Vermont
