= Windham Village Historic District =

Historic district in Vermont, United States

- U.S. National Register of Historic Places
- U.S. Historic district
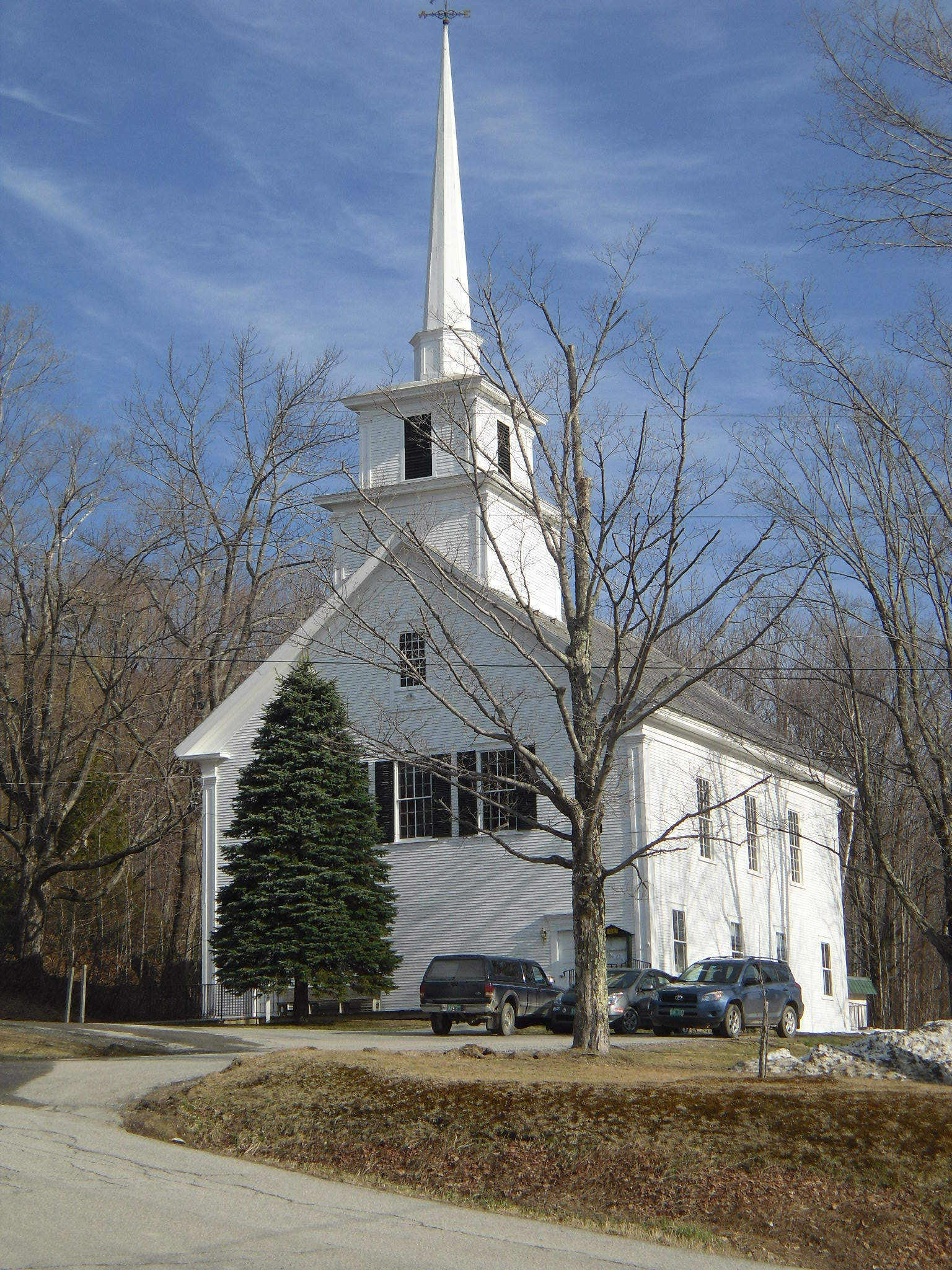
- Windham Congregational Church

- Location within Vermont Location within the United States
- Location: Windham Hill Rd., Windham, Vermont
- Coordinates: 43°10′37″N 72°43′38″W
- Area: 45 acres (18 ha)
- Built: 1785
- Architectural style: Greek Revival, Vernacular Greek Revival
- NRHP reference No.: 84000428
- Added to NRHP: November 1, 1984

The Windham Village Historic District is one of two historic districts in Windham, Vermont, encompassing the dispersed rural village near the town's geographic center. The area was principally developed in the early decades of the 19th century, and has had only modest alterations since then. It was listed on the National Register of Historic Places in 1984.

== Description and history ==
Windham Village is a dispersed rural settlement, extending along Windham Hill Road between Harrington Road and Stone Bridge Road. The focal point of the village is the Congregational Church, located at the junction with Harrington Road, which was built in 1802 and given Greek Revival styling in 1825. There are twelve other primary buildings, of which ten are historically significant, in an area of about 45 acres (18 ha). All of these are residences, typically 1-1/2 or 2 1/2 stories in height, with wood-frame construction and either vernacular Greek or Gothic Revival style. Most were built before 1858—there are only a few 20th century houses in the area, and they are sympathetic in style and scale to the older buildings.

The town of Windham was chartered in the early 1770s, but settlement of this, its central village, did not begin until the 1780s. The village is unusual in the state as a well-preserved and still-occupied high hill villages, many of which were abandoned in the 19th century and early 20th centuries. At the middle of the 19th century, when the town population was at its peak, the village included a small commercial complex, which declined and collapsed in the 1940s, its building materials eventually salvaged by area residents.

== See also ==
- National Register of Historic Places listings in Windham County, Vermont
