= Cheshire Bridge (Connecticut River) =

Bridge in the United States

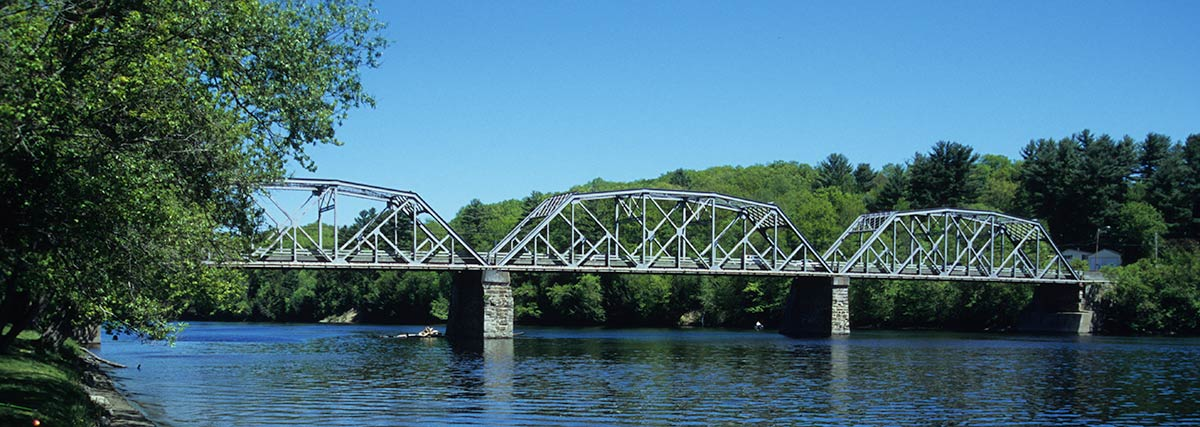
- 1930 Cheshire Bridge over the Connecticut River
- Coordinates: 43.260452°N 72.427319°W
- Carries: 2 lanes of roadway trains (until 1984)
- Crosses: Connecticut River

Characteristics
- Design: three-span Pennsylvania truss
- Total length: 489 feet (149 m)

History
- Constructed by: McClintic-Marshall Co.
- Construction end: 1806, 1906, 1930
- Construction cost: US$225,000 (US$4,240,000 with inflation)
- Opened: 1930

Statistics
- Toll: none since 2001

Location
- Interactive map of Cheshire Bridge

The Cheshire Bridge spans the Connecticut River between Charlestown, New Hampshire, and Springfield, Vermont.

== History ==
The first bridge at this location was completed in 1806 by the Cheshire Bridge Co. and was described as a Town lattice covered toll bridge, a wooden covered bridge. In 1897 the bridge was purchased by the Springfield Electric Railway.

In 1906 the old bridge was replaced by the Iron Bridge Co., at a cost of US$65,000 (US$2,270,000 with inflation). It was a three-span steel Pratt truss bridge, which had a 600-foot (180 m) span and a 20-foot (6.1 m)-wide roadway. Vehicles ran both ways, and also freight and passenger cars. In 1930 the bridge was replaced by the McClintic-Marshall Co. of Pittsburgh, Pennsylvania, at a cost of US$225,000 (US$4,240,000 with inflation). It is a three-span Pennsylvania truss that is 489 feet (149 m) feet long.

The bridge was purchased by the state of New Hampshire in 1992. Tolls were collected until 2001.
