= Grafton Village Historic District =

Historic district in Vermont, United States

- U.S. National Register of Historic Places
- U.S. Historic district
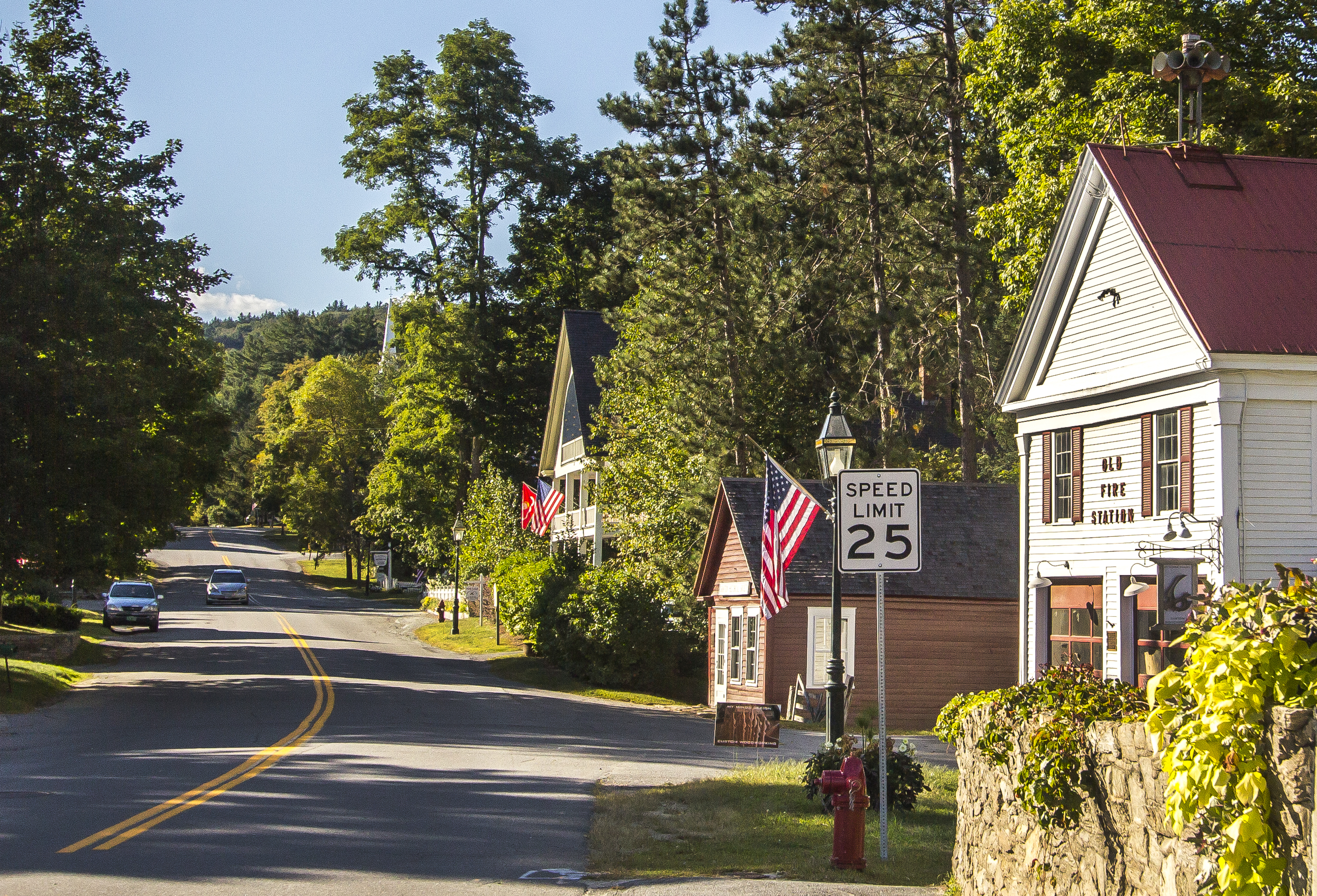
- Main Street

- Location within Vermont Location within the United States
- Location: Main St., Vermont Route 121 E., Townshend Rd., Chester Hill Rd., Kidder Hill Rd., Pleasant St., School St., Middletown Rd., and Hinkley Brook Rd., Grafton, Vermont
- Coordinates: 43°10′18″N 72°36′24″W
- Area: 287 acres (116 ha)
- Architectural style: Federal, Greek Revival
- NRHP reference No.: 10000171
- Added to NRHP: April 7, 2010

The Grafton Village Historic District encompasses the historic village center of the town of Grafton, Vermont. The village was developed in the early-to-mid 19th century, and has retained the character of that period better than many small communities in the state. The district was listed on the National Register of Historic Places in 2010.

== Description and history ==
The area that is now Grafton was first chartered in 1754, but only began to see permanent settlement in the late 1770s, in the town's Middletown section. Grafton Village developed around the confluence of two branches of the Saxtons River, a tributary of the Connecticut River. The first house, a brick structure built about 1795 by Enos Lovell, still stands in the village, and was followed by mills and mill dams on the two rivers, of which only traces now survive. The network of major roads radiating from this area began to take shape then as well. Early development was focused in the area around Kidder Hill Road, while in the second quarter of the 19th century the village center gradually migrated northward, anchored by the construction of the Congregational Church in 1834 and the relocation of its post office in 1841 into what is now the town hall. Grafton's building and economic good times ended about 1870, with little new development taking place until the 20th century, when tourism provided a significant boost to the economy. This boost was accompanied by a strong preservationist drive, resulting in the maintenance of the village's 19th century character.

The historic district encompasses essentially the entire developed area of Grafton village. Its rough southern and northeastern boundaries are the two branches of the Saxtons River, extending east of the north branch along Chester Road and Route 121 East, and extending a short way westward along Houghtonville, Middletown, and Hinkley Brook Roads. Many of the buildings in the village are Federal and Greek Revival in character, or are in 20th-century revival styles that are sympathetic. Most are wood frame structures between 1 and three stories in height, although there are a variety of brick buildings as well. A number of buildings have Italianate and later Victorian style. Very few of the historic buildings have been altered in unsympathetic ways, such as the application of synthetic siding or the installation of vinyl windows. The streetscape is also devoid of significant modern intrusions such as utility poles.

Six properties in the district are individually listed on the National Register. The Kidder Covered Bridge is the town's only surviving covered bridge, and the Butterfield House (now the library) and the Milldean and Alexander-Davis House are two architecturally significant houses. The Grafton Congregational Church and Chapel, former Grafton Post Office, and Grafton District Schoolhouse No. 2, are all significant for their civic history as well as architecture.

== See also ==
- Grafton (CDP), Vermont
- National Register of Historic Places listings in Windham County, Vermont
