= South Windham Village Historic District =

Historic district in Vermont, United States

- U.S. National Register of Historic Places
- U.S. Historic district
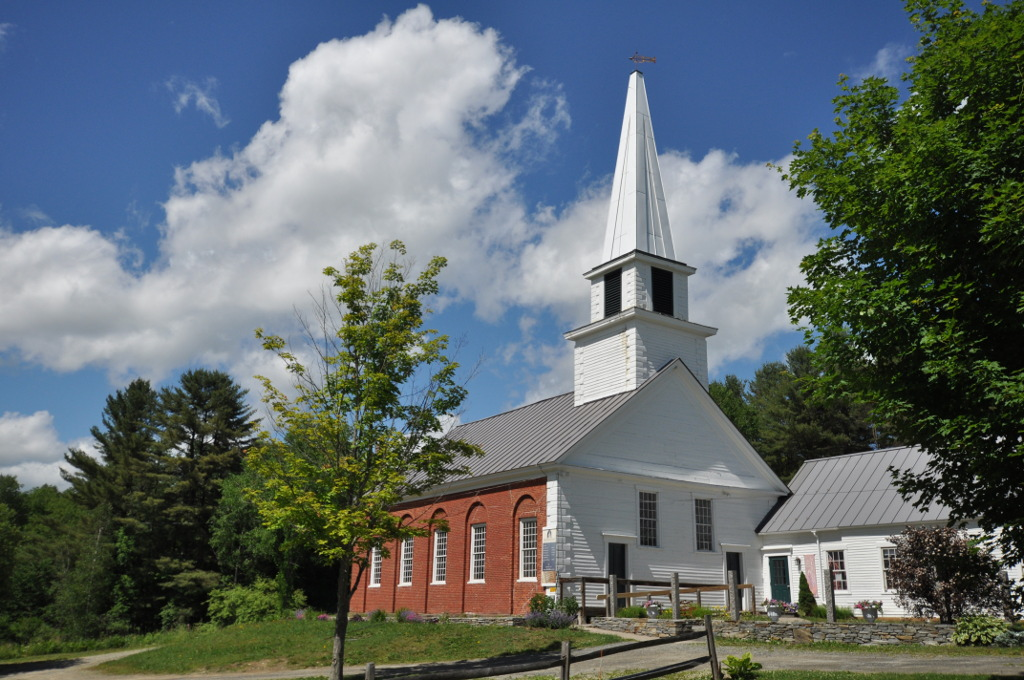

- Location within Vermont Location within the United States
- Location: Windham Hill Rd and Chase Rd, Windham, Vermont
- Coordinates: 43°7′42″N 72°42′47″W
- Area: 23 acres (9.3 ha)
- NRHP reference No.: 88002061
- Added to NRHP: October 27, 1988

The South Windham Village Historic District encompasses a small rural village in southern Windham, Vermont. Located at the junction of Windham Hill and Chase Roads, it has been little altered since the late 19th century. The district was listed on the National Register of Historic Places in 1988.

== Description and history ==
South Windham is a rural hill village, nestled in a now-forested valley in southernmost Windham, just across the town line with Jamaica on Windham Hill Road. The settlement consists of eleven main structures, the most notable of which is the Valley Bible Church, built in 1825 and distinguished by its brick sides and rear wall as well as its Federal architecture. Most of the buildings in the village are houses, wood frame structures 1-1/2 to 2-1/2 stories in height, with vernacular Greek Revival features. The other notable exception is the c. 1887 district schoolhouse, now a private residence. The village once had a store, built c. 1855; it was demolished in 1987.

The village's economic history is typical of similar villages in Vermont's hill towns, rising in the early 19th century on an agricultural base, but later declining due to shifting economic forces. As a result, a relatively large number of agricultural buildings survive in the center, including several mid-19th century barns, and a number of chicken coops. The most stylish of the houses is the Harrington-Brown House, built c. 1860 at the southern end of the village; it has pedimented windows on the first floor and an entablature on the main facade below the roof.

== See also ==
- National Register of Historic Places listings in Windham County, Vermont
