= Windham, Vermont =

- Town
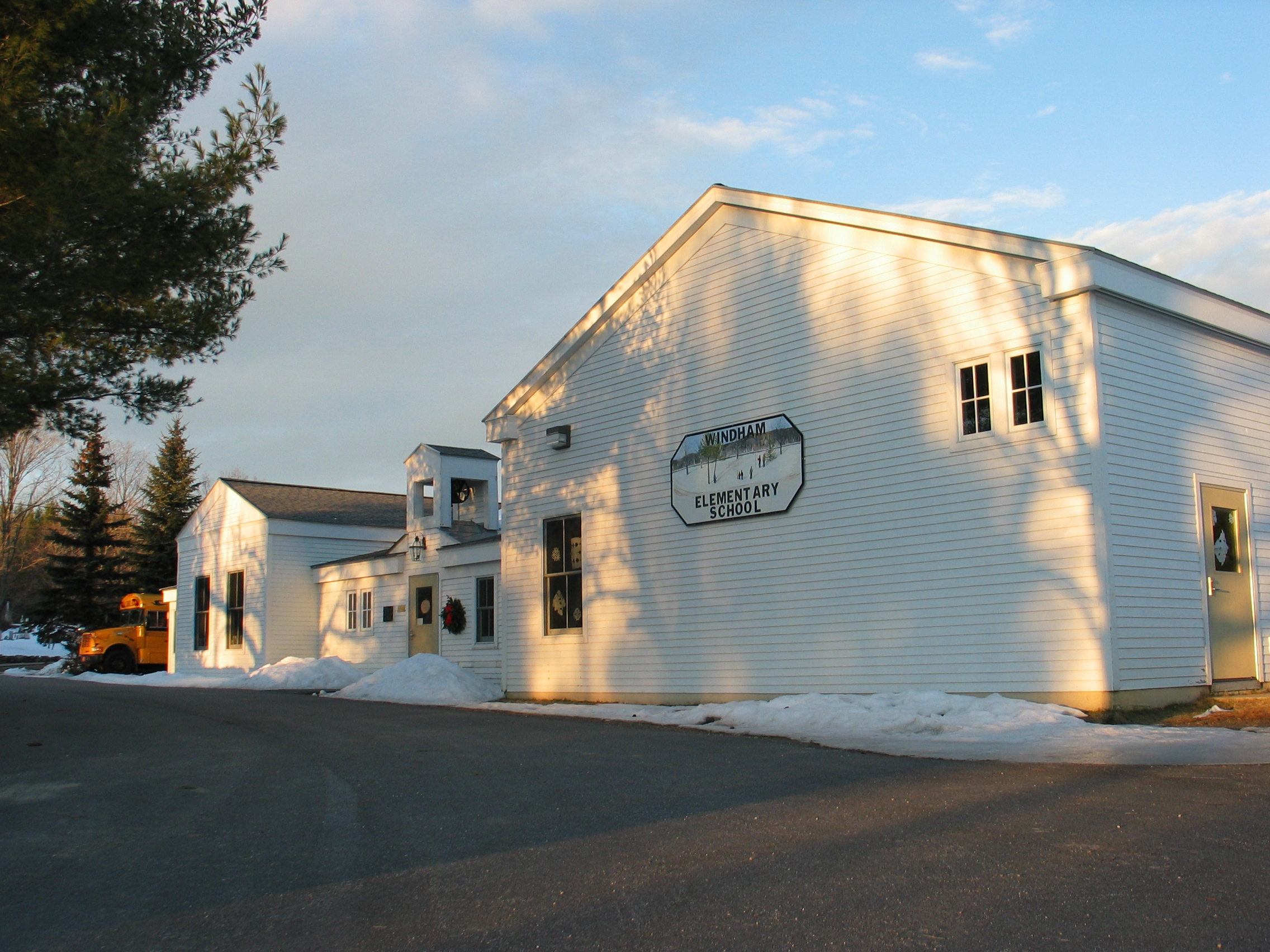
- Windham Elementary School

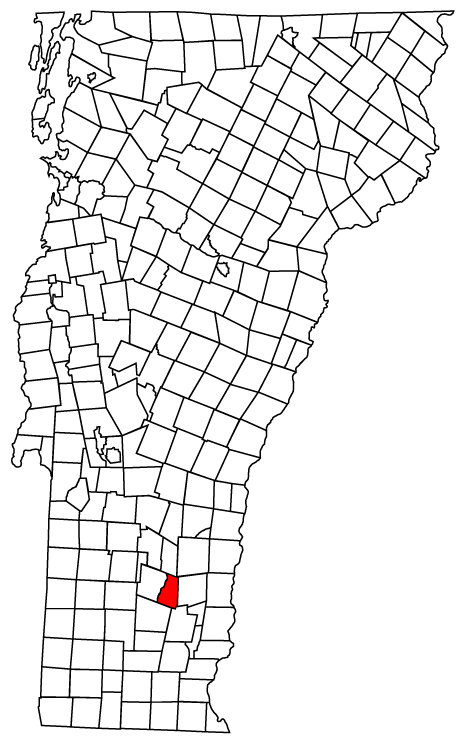
- Windham, Vermont
- Coordinates: 43°09′40″N 72°43′07″W
- Country: United States
- State: Vermont
- County: Windham
- Communities: Windham; North Windham; South Windham

Area
  - Total: 26.1 sq mi (67.6 km^{2})
  - Land: 26.1 sq mi (67.5 km^{2})
  - Water: 0.039 sq mi (0.1 km^{2})
- Elevation: 1,775 ft (541 m)

Population (2020)
  - Total: 449
  - Density: 17/sq mi (6.7/km^{2})
- Time zone: UTC-5 (Eastern (EST))
  - Summer (DST): UTC-4 (EDT)
- ZIP Codes: 05359 (Windham); 05143 (Chester); 05146 (Grafton)
- Area code: 802
- FIPS code: 50-84850
- GNIS feature ID: 1462265
- Website: townofwindhamvt.org

Windham is a town in Windham County, Vermont, United States. The population was 449 at the 2020 census. The town center village is designated as the Windham Village Historic District.

== History ==
Windham was part of Londonderry until after 1792 and was "duly organized" in 1796. The first settler of what was to become the village was Benjamin Pierce c. 1783. Pierce was from Westmoreland, New Hampshire. Being such a small and dispersed mountain village, relatively few men from Windham served with the Union Army during the American Civil War. Windham County itself contributed heavily to manning the 4th Vermont Infantry and most of the village's sons joined Company C or K of that regiment. The regiment saw heavy combat throughout the war.

One of Windham's soldiers, Captain Charles G. Gould of Company H, 5th Vermont Infantry, won the Medal of Honor for bravery under fire.

== Geography ==
According to the United States Census Bureau, the town has a total area of 26.1 square miles (67.7 km^{2}), of which 26.1 square miles (67.5 km^{2}) is land and 0.04 square mile (0.1 km^{2}) (0.15%) is water.

== Demographics ==
Historical population
Census	Pop.	Note	%±
1800	429		—
1810	782		82.3%
1820	931		19.1%
1830	847		−9.0%
1840	757		−10.6%
1850	763		0.8%
1860	680		−10.9%
1870	544		−20.0%
1880	536		−1.5%
1890	379		−29.3%
1900	356		−6.1%
1910	345		−3.1%
1920	261		−24.3%
1930	254		−2.7%
1940	183		−28.0%
1950	146		−20.2%
1960	135		−7.5%
1970	174		28.9%
1980	223		28.2%
1990	251		12.6%
2000	328		30.7%
2010	419		27.7%
2020	449		7.2%
U.S. Decennial Census

As of the census of 2000, there were 328 people, 150 households, and 91 families residing in the town. The population density was 12.6 people per square mile (4.9/km^{2}). There were 354 housing units at an average density of 13.6 per square mile (5.2/km^{2}). The racial makeup of the town was 96.04% White, 0.30% African American, 0.30% Asian, 0.91% from other races, and 2.44% from two or more races. Hispanic or Latino of any race were 1.22% of the population.

There were 150 households, out of which 21.3% had children under the age of 18 living with them, 52.0% were married couples living together, 3.3% had a female householder with no husband present, and 39.3% were non-families. 33.3% of all households were made up of individuals, and 12.0% had someone living alone who was 65 years of age or older. The average household size was 2.19 and the average family size was 2.76.

In the town, the population was spread out, with 19.2% under the age of 18, 8.5% from 18 to 24, 25.3% from 25 to 44, 24.7% from 45 to 64, and 22.3% who were 65 years of age or older. The median age was 43 years. For every 100 females, there were 115.8 males. For every 100 females age 18 and over, there were 117.2 males.

The median income for a household in the town was $39,659, and the median income for a family was $41,786. Males had a median income of $27,500 versus $23,125 for females. The per capita income for the town was $20,704. About 2.2% of families and 6.3% of the population were below the poverty line, including 8.7% of those under age 18 and 4.9% of those age 65 or over.
