= Charles Gilbert Gould =

Union Army soldier in the American Civil War

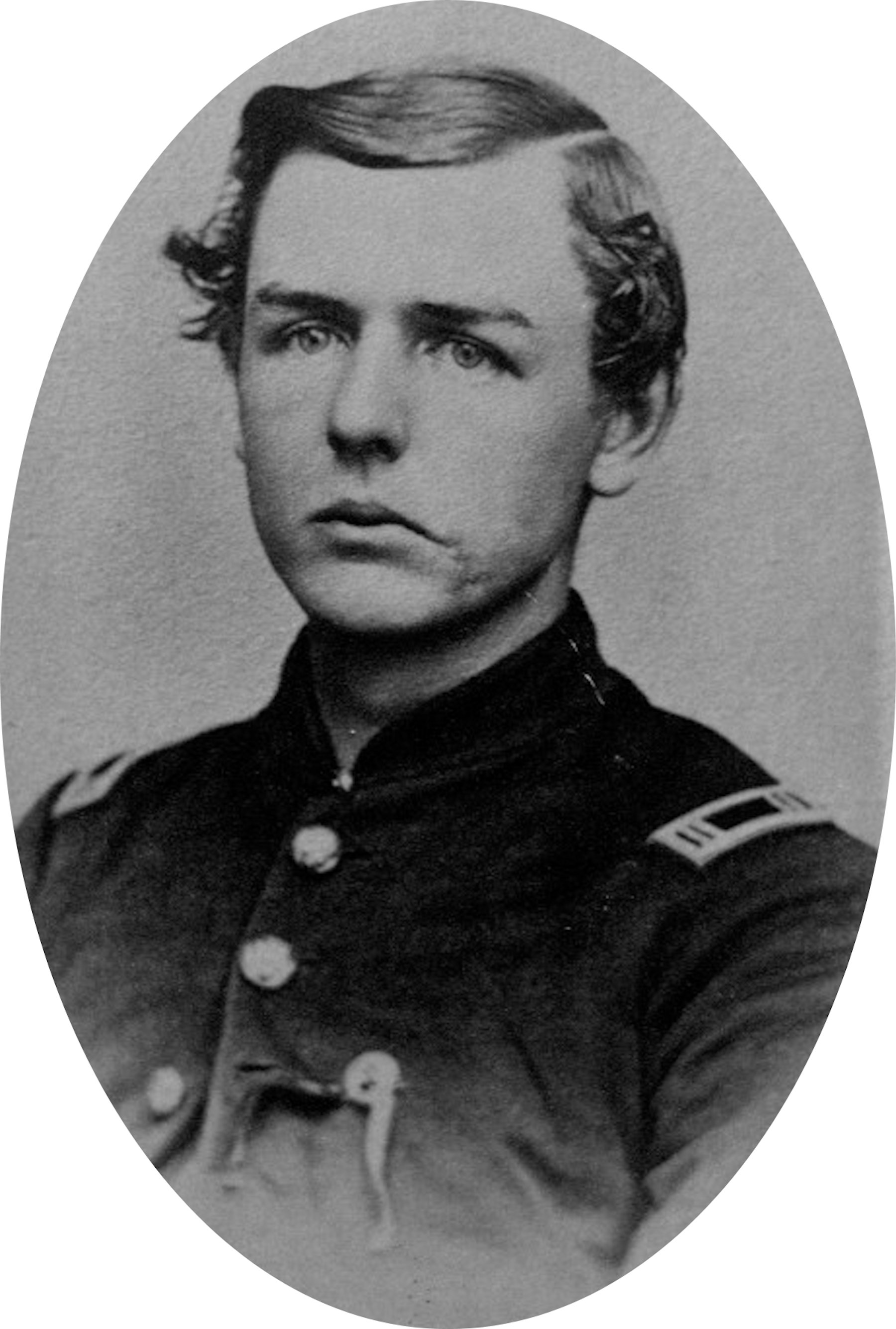
- Medal of Honor Recipient Charles Gilbert Gould
- Born: May 5, 1845; Windham County, Vermont
- Died: December 5, 1916 (aged 71)
- Burial place: Windham, Vermont
- Military career
- Allegiance: United States
- Branch: United States Army
- Rank: Captain; Brevet Major
- Units: Company H, 5th Vermont Volunteer Infantry Regiment
- Conflicts: American Civil War
- Awards: Medal of Honor

Charles Gilbert Gould (May 5, 1845 – December 5, 1916) was a Union Army soldier in the American Civil War who received the U.S. military's highest decoration, the Medal of Honor.

Gould was born in Windham County, Vermont, on May 5, 1845. He was awarded the Medal of Honor, for extraordinary heroism shown on April 2, 1865, while serving as a captain with Company H, 5th Vermont Infantry, at Petersburg, Virginia. His Medal of Honor was issued on July 30, 1890. He was breveted to the rank of major and, after the war, became a companion of the Vermont Commandery of the Military Order of the Loyal Legion of the United States.

He died at the age of 71, on December 5, 1916, and was buried at the Windham Center Cemetery in Windham, Vermont.

== Medal of Honor citation ==
The President of the United States of America, in the name of Congress, takes pleasure in presenting the Medal of Honor to Captain (Infantry) Charles Gilbert Gould, United States Army, for extraordinary heroism on 2 April 1865, while serving with Company H, 5th Vermont Infantry, in action at Petersburg, Virginia. Among the first to mount the enemy's works in the assault, Captain Gould received a serious bayonet wound in the face, was struck several times with clubbed muskets, but bravely stood his ground, and with his sword killed the man who bayoneted him.
