= Grafton Public Library (Grafton, Vermont) =

- Butterfield House
- U.S. National Register of Historic Places
- U.S. Historic district – Contributing property
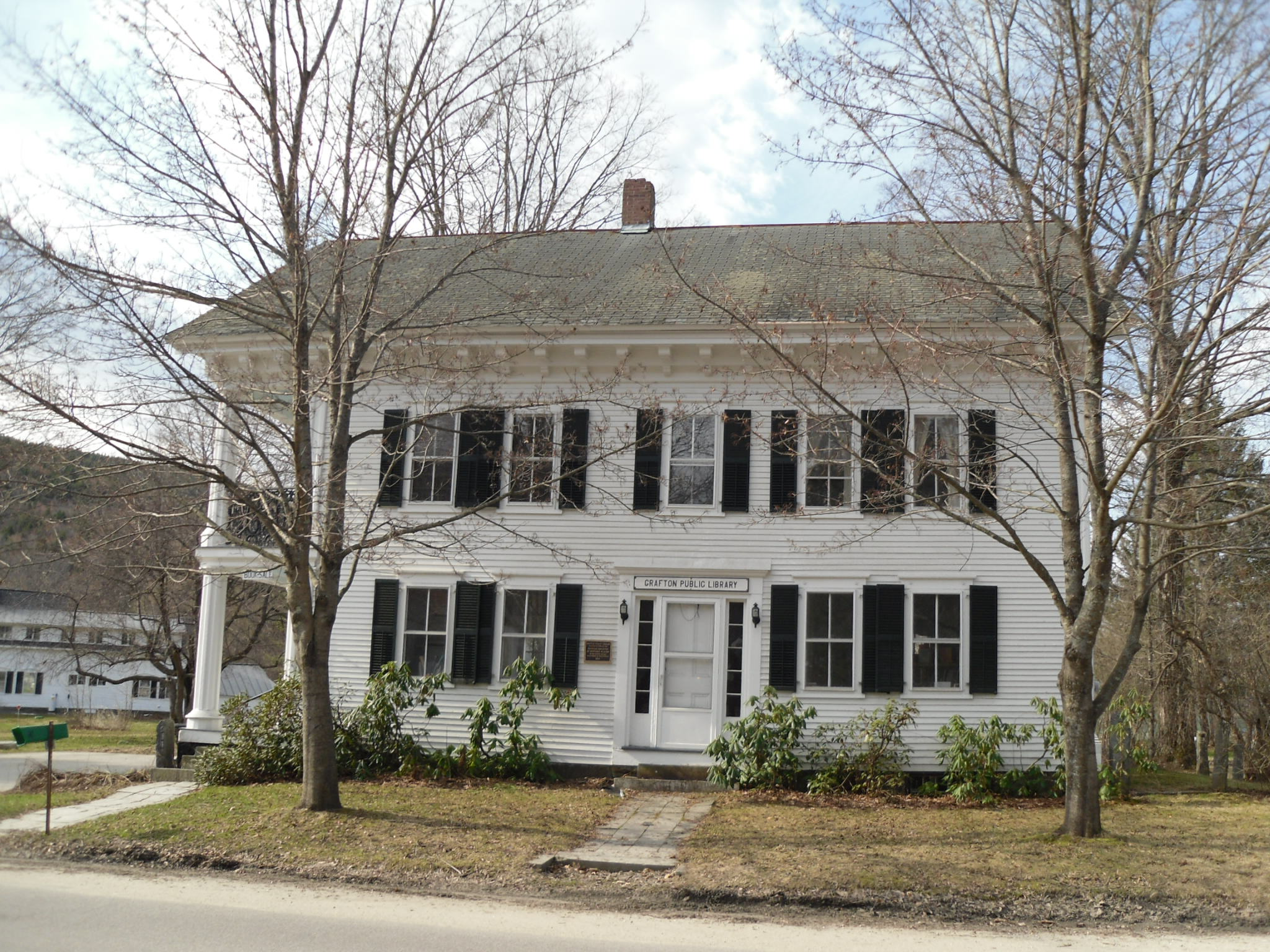

- Location within Vermont Location within the United States
- Location: 204 Main St., Grafton, Vermont
- Coordinates: 43°10′24″N 72°36′25″W
- Area: 1 acre (0.40 ha)
- Built: 1811
- Architectural style: Greek Revival
- Part of: Grafton Village Historic District (ID10000171)
- NRHP reference No.: 05000806

Significant dates
- Added to NRHP: August 6, 2005
- Designated CP: April 7, 2010

The Grafton Public Library is a 19th-century library located in Grafton, Vermont in the historic Butterfield House. It was listed on the National Register of Historic Places in 2012.

== Services ==
The library offers books and other media for lending, including via interlibrary loan. Services include the use of computers and printers, and wireless internet access. Patrons may also remotely access a variety of online databases.

== Architecture and history ==
The library is located on the south side of Main Street, in the eastern part of Grafton's village center. It is in a 2 1/2-story wood-frame house, with a gable roof, clapboard siding, and a granite foundation. It is roughly rectangular, set parallel to the street, with a five bay facade that has an entrance at its center. The building's main entrance, however, is on the building's eastern facade, which features a two-story portico underneath an extension of the main roof, with polygonal columns as support, and a wrought iron railing on the second floor. The building's cornices and gable rakes are studded with scrolled modillions. An older 1 1/2-story ell extends to the south.

The oldest portion of the house, a portion of its ell, may have been standing on the property when it was purchased by John Butterfield in 1811, as it exhibits Federal period styling and workmanship. The main block of the house achieved its present appearance in the 1860s, having possibly been built as a 1 1/2-story Cape style house by Butterfield and then had a second floor added. The styling, a combination of Greek Revival and Italianate features, is not unusual for houses of the 1860s in Vermont. The house has served as the town library since the 1950s.

== See also ==
- National Register of Historic Places listings in Windham County, Vermont
