= Vermont Route 35 =

State highway in southeastern Vermont, US

Vermont Route 35
- Map of southeastern Vermont with VT 35 highlighted in red

Route information
- Maintained by the Towns of Townshend, Athens, Grafton, and Chester
- Length: 21.220 mi (34.150 km)

Major junctions
- South end: VT 30 in Townshend
- North end: VT 11 in Chester

Location
- Country: United States
- State: Vermont
- Counties: Windham, Windsor

Highway system
- State highways in Vermont
← VT 31	→ VT 36

Vermont Route 35 (VT 35) is a 21.220-mile-long (34.150 km) north–south state highway in southeastern Vermont, United States. It runs from an intersection with VT 30 in Townshend north to an intersection with VT 11 in Chester. The entirety of VT 35 is town-maintained.

== Route description ==
VT 35 begins at the intersection with VT 30 in Townshend. It runs northeast, intersecting with VT 121 in the Cambridgeport section of Grafton, approximately 5 miles (8.0 km) west of the border with New Hampshire. VT 35 and VT 121 run concurrently to the northwest for a few miles into the center of Grafton. VT 121 splits off to the west, while VT 35 turns due north, continuing into the town of Chester, where it ends at an intersection with VT 11. A short section of VT 35 in Athens was gravel until 2018, when the road was fully paved.

== Major intersections ==
County	Location	mi	km	Destinations	Notes
Windham	Townshend	0.000	0.000	VT 30 – Newfane, Jamaica	Southern terminus
Windham	Grafton	10.190	16.399	VT 121 east (Saxtons River Road) – Cambridgeport	Eastern end of overlap
Windham	Grafton	14.070	22.643	VT 121 west (Main Street) – Londonderry, North Windham	Western end of overlap
Windsor	Chester	21.220	34.150	VT 11 (Main Street) – Manchester, Springfield, Rockingham	Northern terminus
1.000 mi = 1.609 km; 1.000 km = 0.621 mi: Concurrency terminus
