= Athens, Vermont =

- Town
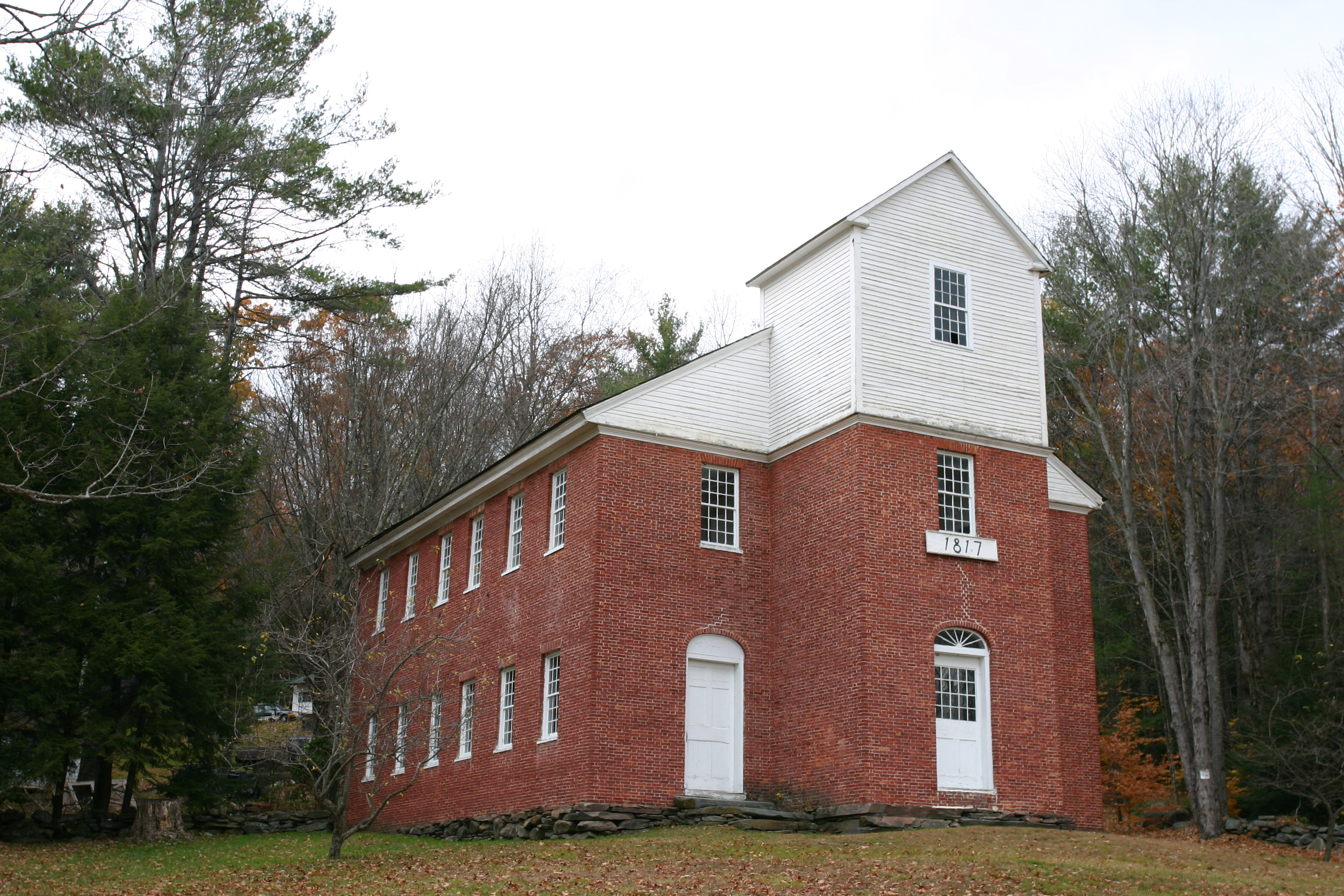
- Athens meeting house

- Athens, Vermont
- Coordinates: 43°07′45″N 72°36′40″W
- Country: United States
- State: Vermont
- County: Windham

Area
  - Total: 13.1 sq mi (33.9 km^{2})
  - Land: 13.1 sq mi (33.8 km^{2})
  - Water: 0.039 sq mi (0.1 km^{2})
- Elevation: 1,102 ft (336 m)

Population (2020)
  - Total: 380
  - Density: 29/sq mi (11.2/km^{2})
- Time zone: UTC-5 (Eastern (EST))
  - Summer (DST): UTC-4 (EDT)
- ZIP Codes: 05143 (Athens); 05146 (Grafton)
- Area code: 802
- FIPS code: 50-01900
- GNIS feature ID: 1462028
- Website: www.athensvt.com

Athens (/ˈæθɪnz/ ATH-inz or /ˈeɪθɪnz/ AY-thinz) is a town in Windham County, Vermont, United States. The population was 380 at the 2020 census.

== Geography ==
According to the United States Census Bureau, the town has a total area of 13.1 square miles (33.9 km^{2}), of which 13.0 square miles (33.8 km^{2}) is land and 0.04 square mile (0.1 km^{2}) (0.31%) is water.

== Demographics ==
Historical population
Census	Pop.	Note	%±
1790	450		—
1800	459		2.0%
1810	478		4.1%
1820	507		6.1%
1830	415		−18.1%
1840	378		−8.9%
1850	359		−5.0%
1860	382		6.4%
1870	295		−22.8%
1880	284		−3.7%
1890	205		−27.8%
1900	180		−12.2%
1910	201		11.7%
1920	123		−38.8%
1930	132		7.3%
1940	136		3.0%
1950	139		2.2%
1960	142		2.2%
1970	159		12.0%
1980	250		57.2%
1990	313		25.2%
2000	340		8.6%
2010	442		30.0%
2020	380		−14.0%
U.S. Decennial Census

As of the census of 2010, there were 442 people, 181 households, and 113 families residing in the town. The population density was 34.0 people per square mile (13.1/km^{2}). There were 247 housing units at an average density of 19.0 per square mile (7.3/km^{2}). The racial makeup of the town was 95.48% White, 0.68% African American, 0.45% Native American, 0.90% Asian, 0.23% from other races, and 2.26% from two or more races. Hispanic or Latino of any race were 1.13% of the population.

There were 181 households, out of which 25.4% had children under the age of 18 living with them, 47.5% were married couples living together, 8.3% had a female householder with no husband present, and 37.6% were non-families. 28.2% of all households were made up of individuals, and 9.1% had someone living alone who was 65 years of age or older. The average household size was 2.44 and the average family size was 2.96.

In the town, the population was spread out, with 22.4% under the age of 18, 6.1% from 18 to 24, 24.2% from 25 to 44, 34.4% from 45 to 64, and 12.9% who were 65 years of age or older. The median age was 40.0 years. For every 100 females, there were 113.5 males. For every 100 females age 18 and over, there were 107.9 males.

According to 2010–2014 American Community Survey 5-year estimates, the median income for a household in the town was $28,875, and the median income for a family was $40,313. Males had a median income of $32,273 versus $20,625 for females. The per capita income for the town was $20,746. About 28.0% of families and 32.5% of the population were below the poverty line, including 51.5% of those under age 18 and 9.6% of those age 65 or over.

== Notable person ==
- James McMillan Shafter, jurist and legislator

== Television ==
Athens was the stage for an episode of Extreme Makeover: Home Edition to build a new house for the Vitale family. The construction was filmed in September 2007, the episode aired December 9, 2007, on ABC.

The Vitale family have two sons. Their youngest son, Louie Angelo Jr., was diagnosed with multiple birth defects. The team transforms their home to make it handicap-accessible.
