= Saxtons River =

River in the U.S. state of Vermont

Coordinates: 43.1378556°N 72.5098115°W

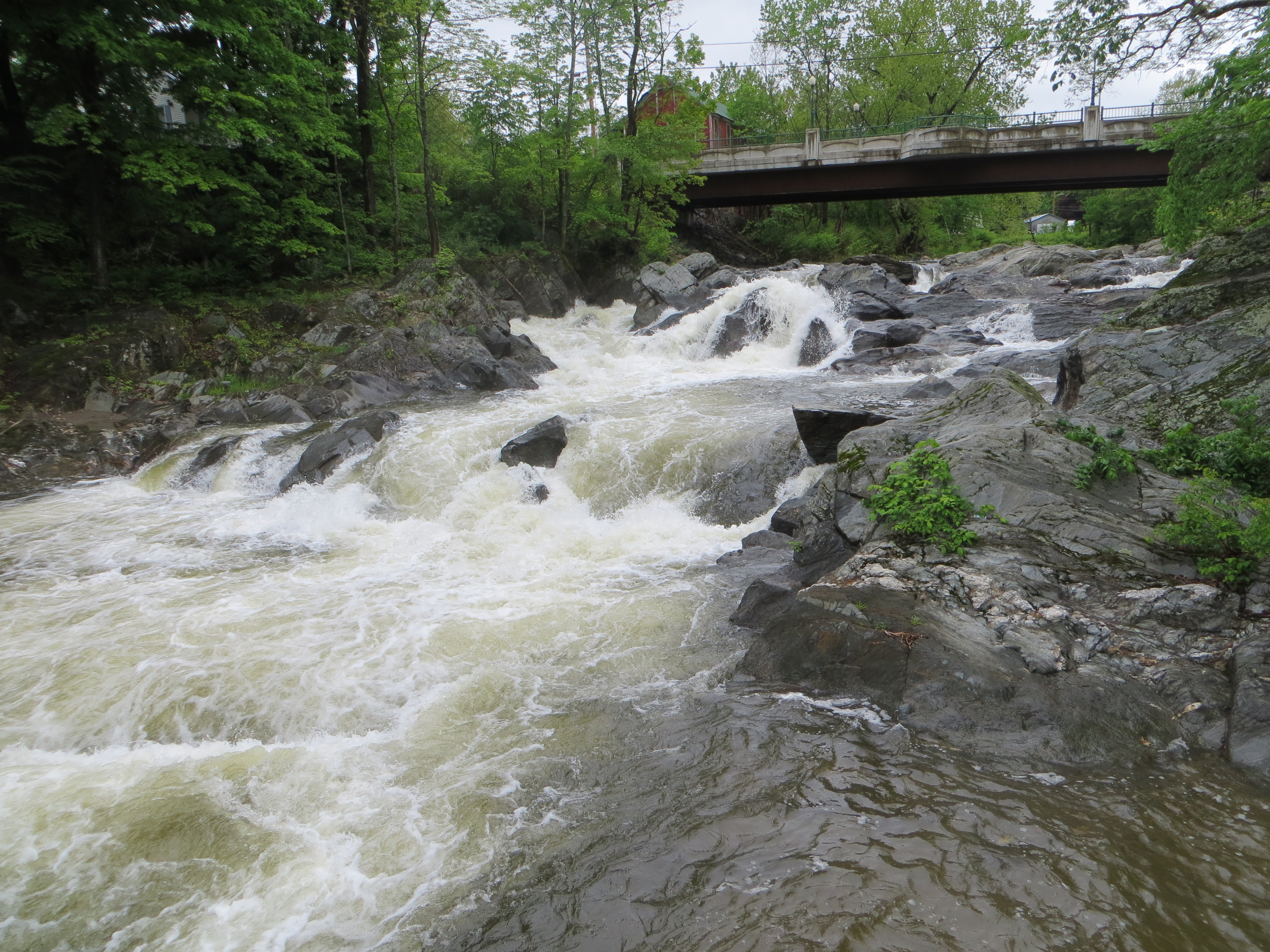
Saxtons River Falls in Saxtons River Village, seen from below the Centennial Bridge (Westminster St), at fairly high flow. Part of Tenney's Mill (red building) is visible behind the bridge; it was powered by water from a dam farther upstream. The foundations of Frey's Mill, which was powered by water from these falls, are just out of the frame on the right.

The Saxtons River is a 22.9-mile-long (36.9 km) river in the U.S. state of Vermont, a tributary of the Connecticut River. Its watershed covers 78 square miles (200 km^{2}) and a range in altitude of 1,800 feet (550 m); land use is about 80% forested and 3% agricultural, and the upper river supports wild brook trout and brown trout, while Atlantic salmon occur but are usually limited to the area below Twin Falls on the lower river.

== Etymology ==
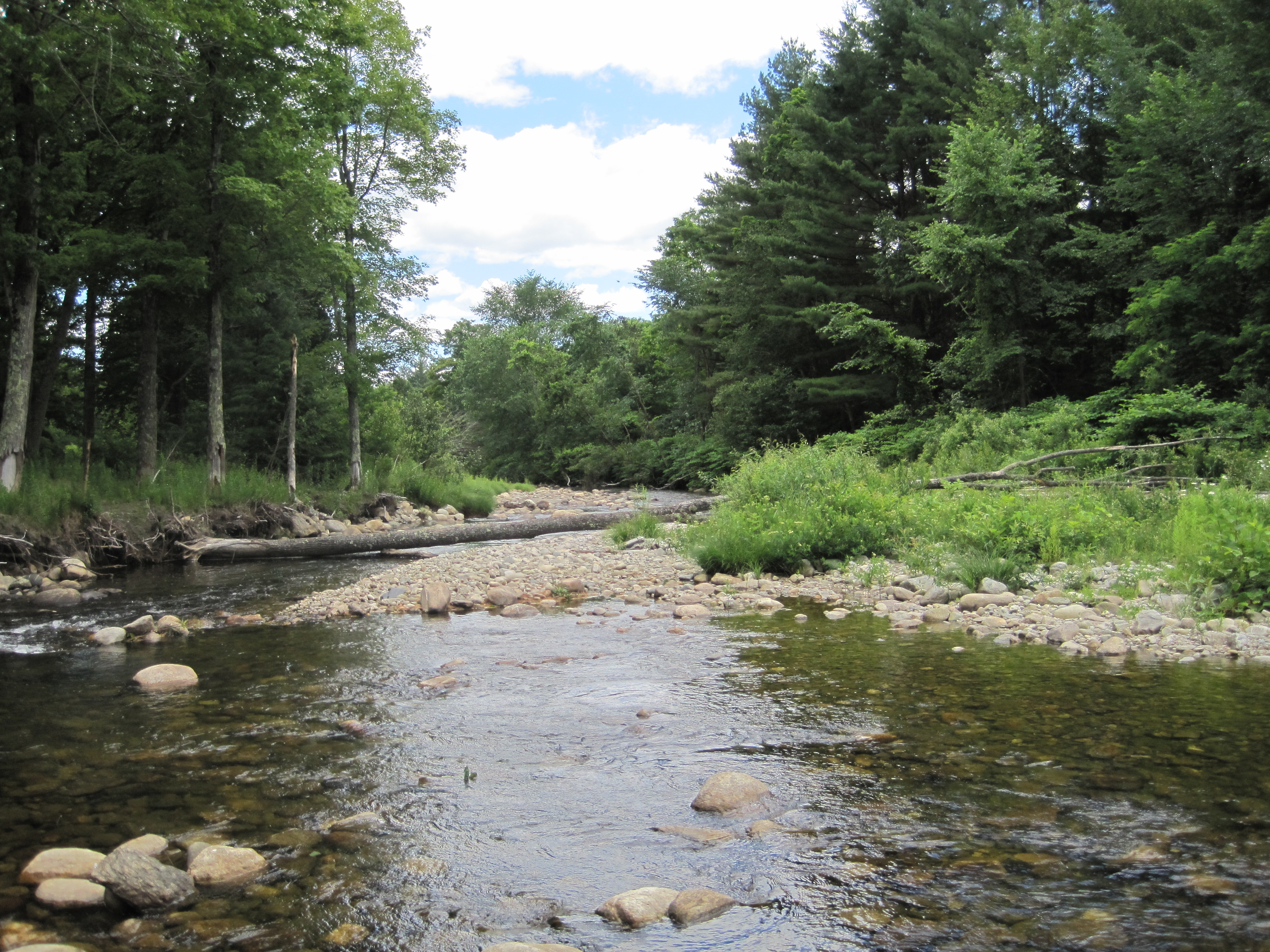
Looking east down Saxtons River, just west of the village of Saxtons River.

The river is often reported to be named after a surveyor named Saxton who drowned (or almost drowned) in the river during the first survey of town lines along the river in 1736, but this does not appear to be the source of the name. "Saxton's" was apparently a variant spelling of "Sexton's," which was the spelling used in the first written record of the river, by a scouting party from Fort Dummer in 1724. We do not know the source for the "Sexton's" name, however.

== Geography ==
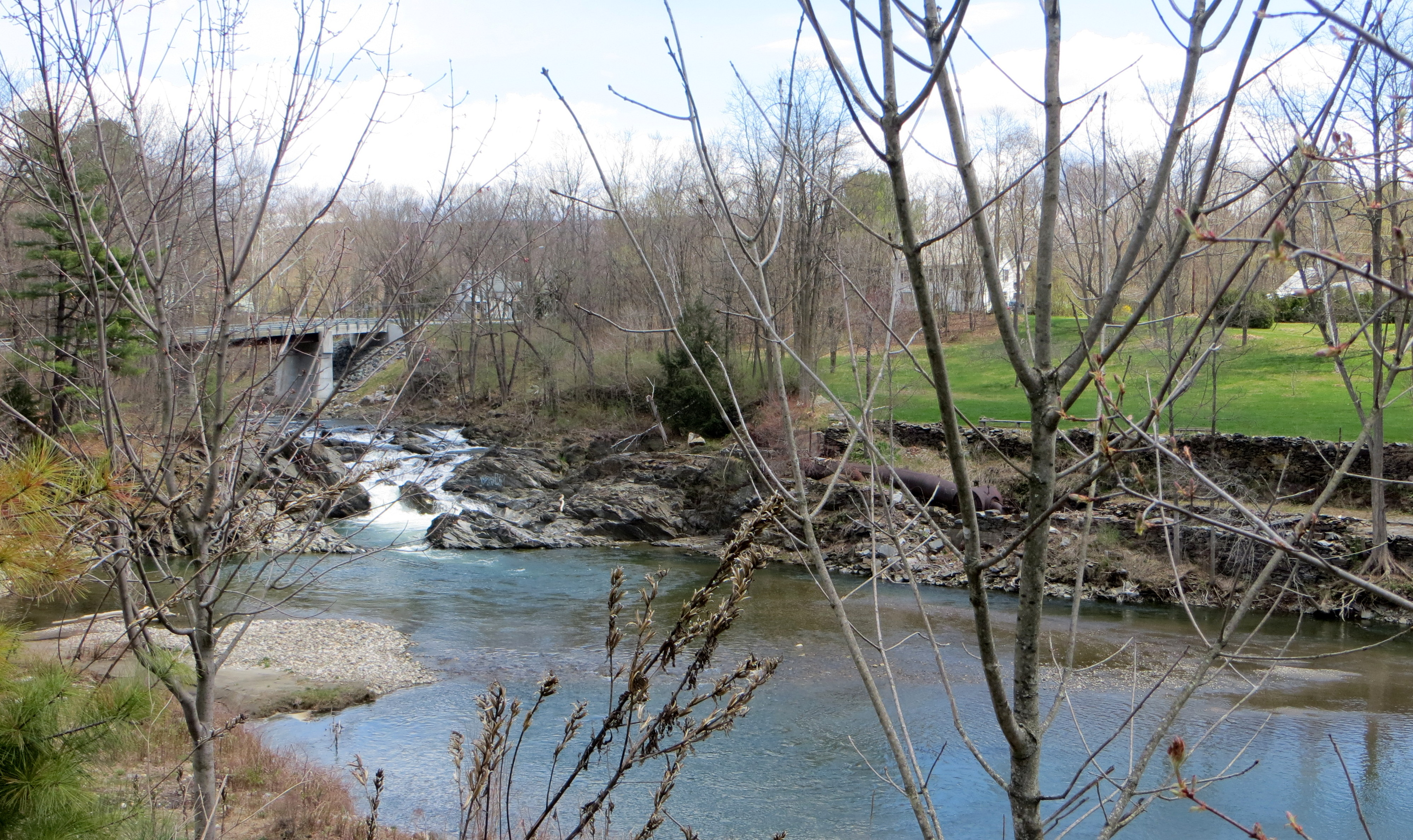
Gages Falls on the Saxtons River with ruin of Gages Mill on the right, North Westminster, VT.

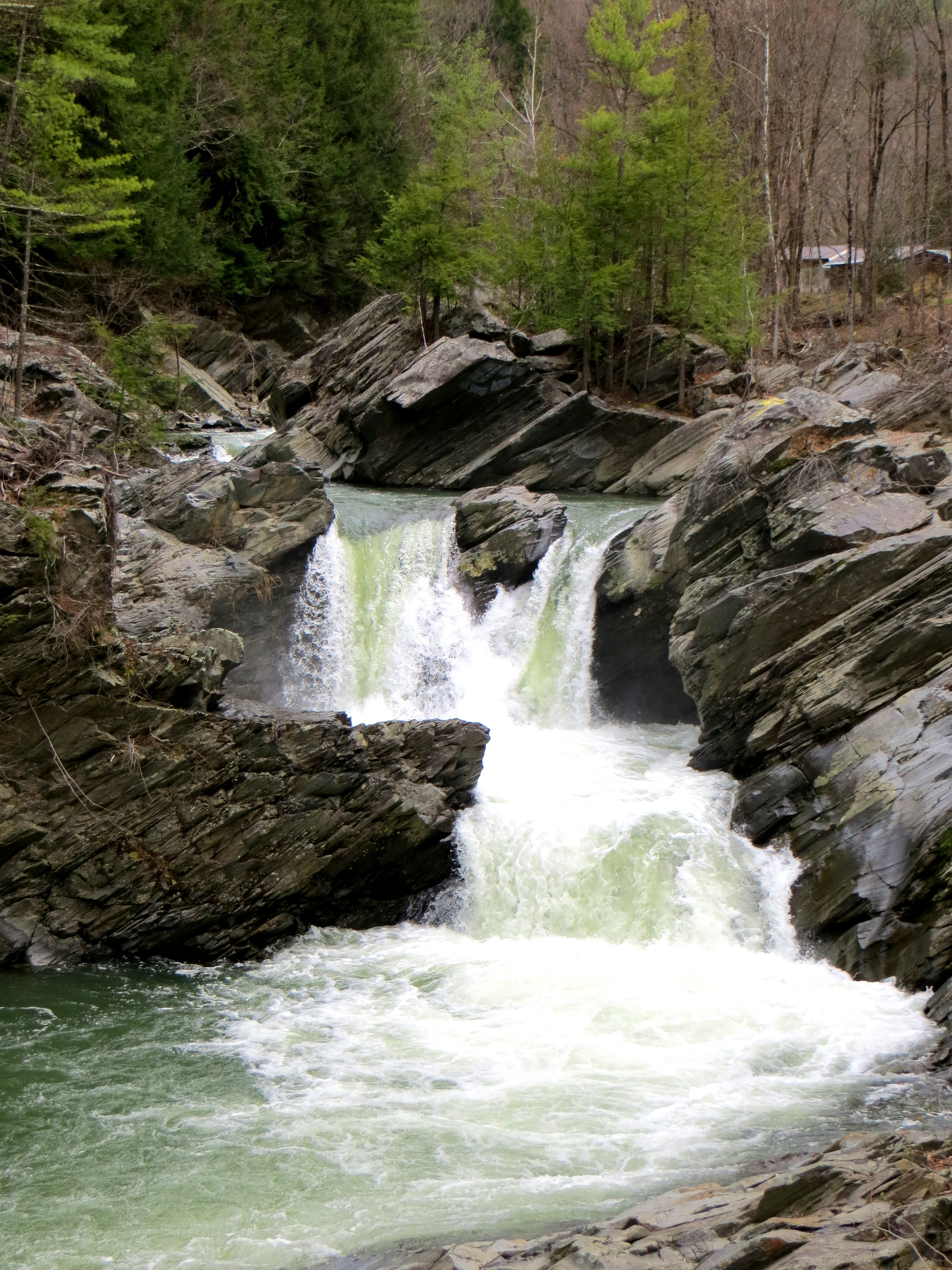
Twin Falls on the Saxtons River

The Saxtons River rises to the east of Glebe Mountain, in the town of Windham. It continues on through the towns of Grafton and Rockingham, passing through the Rockingham village of Saxtons River (named for the river). It then continues into the town of Westminster before joining the Connecticut River at Westminster, just south of the Rockingham town line. Its watershed lies south of the Williams River watershed and north of the Westminster and Putney brook watersheds (most of Westminster and Putney are not drained by any rivers other than the Connecticut).

The Saxtons River is crossed by two covered bridges. The Kidder Covered Bridge crosses the South Branch Saxtons River in Grafton, and the Hall Covered Bridge crosses the river in Rockingham. The former was built in about 1870, and the latter is a replacement built in 1982 for the original 1867 bridge, which was destroyed by an overweight truck in 1980.

There are three notable waterfalls on the Saxtons River, listed from upriver to downriver: Saxtons River Falls in the village of Saxtons River, just below Centennial Bridge on Westminster St; Gages Falls in North Westminster, also called Gageville, just below the bridge on Covered Bridge Rd; and Twin Falls, a short distance downriver from Gages falls in North Westminster near Forest Rd.

== Tributaries ==
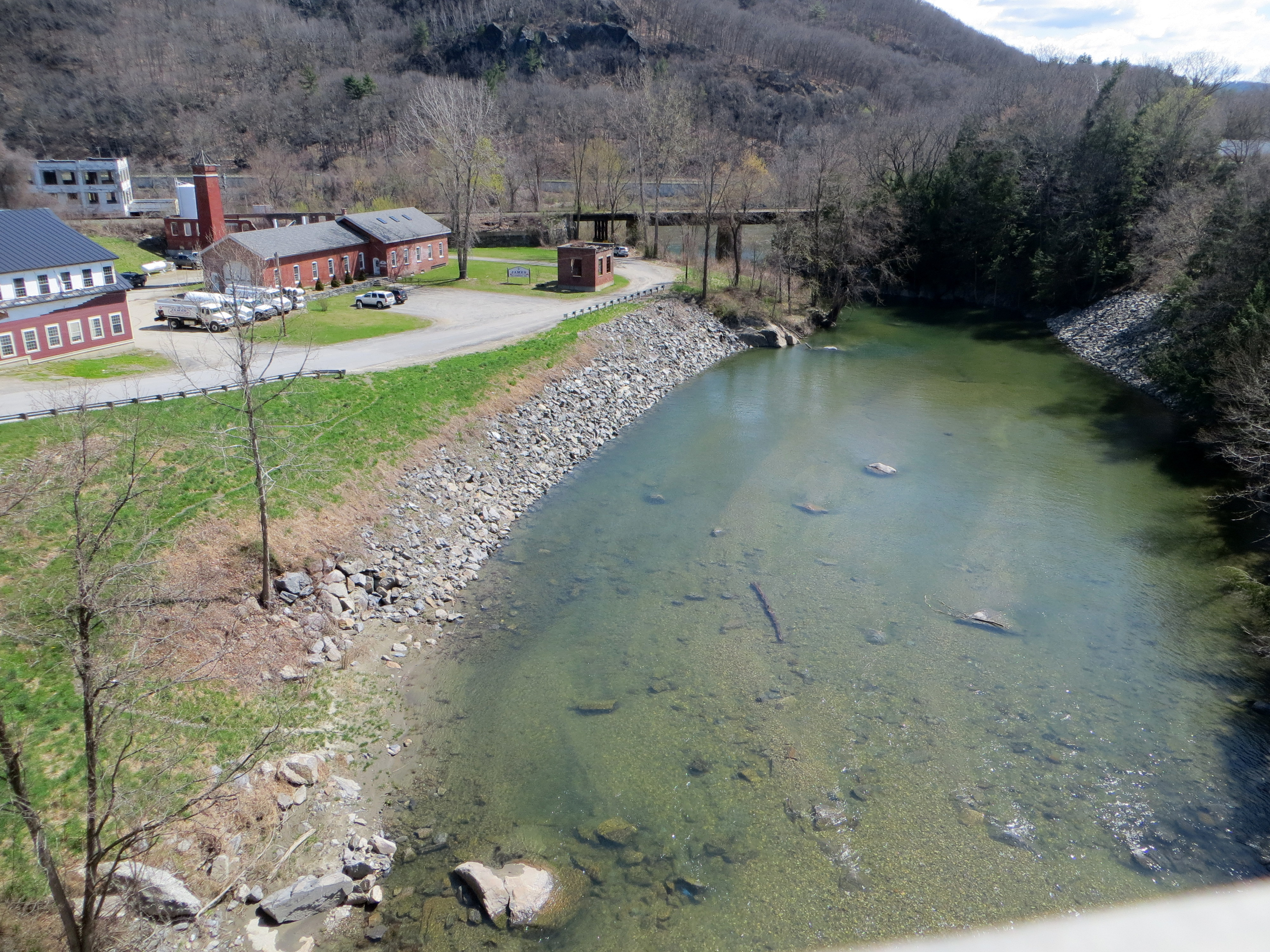
Lower end of the Saxtons River, where it flows into the Connecticut River.

Its larger tributaries (listed from upriver to downriver) include Hinkley Brook and South Branch Saxtons River, flowing north in Grafton; Bull Creek flowing north and Weaver Brook flowing south, near Cambridgeport; Leach Brook, flowing south along Leach Rd between Cambridgeport and the village of Saxtons River; Pleasant Valley Brook, flowing south near Pleasant Valley Rd and joining the river on the west side of the village of Saxtons River; Signal Hill Brook, flowing south along Rockingham Hill Rd and Pleasant St and joining the river near Oak St; and Barnes Brook, flowing north near Westminster West Rd and joining the river behind a trailer park.

Joining the river east of the village of Saxtons River are Marks Brook, which starts near Paradise Hill northeast of the village and flows south near Hall Bridge Rd, and Bundy Brook, which flows north near Davidson Hill Rd, crosses Back Westminster Rd where it flows over a small stone dam, and joins the river near where Vermont Route 121 is crossed by Interstate 91

== See also ==
- List of rivers of Vermont
