= Rockingham, Vermont =

- Town
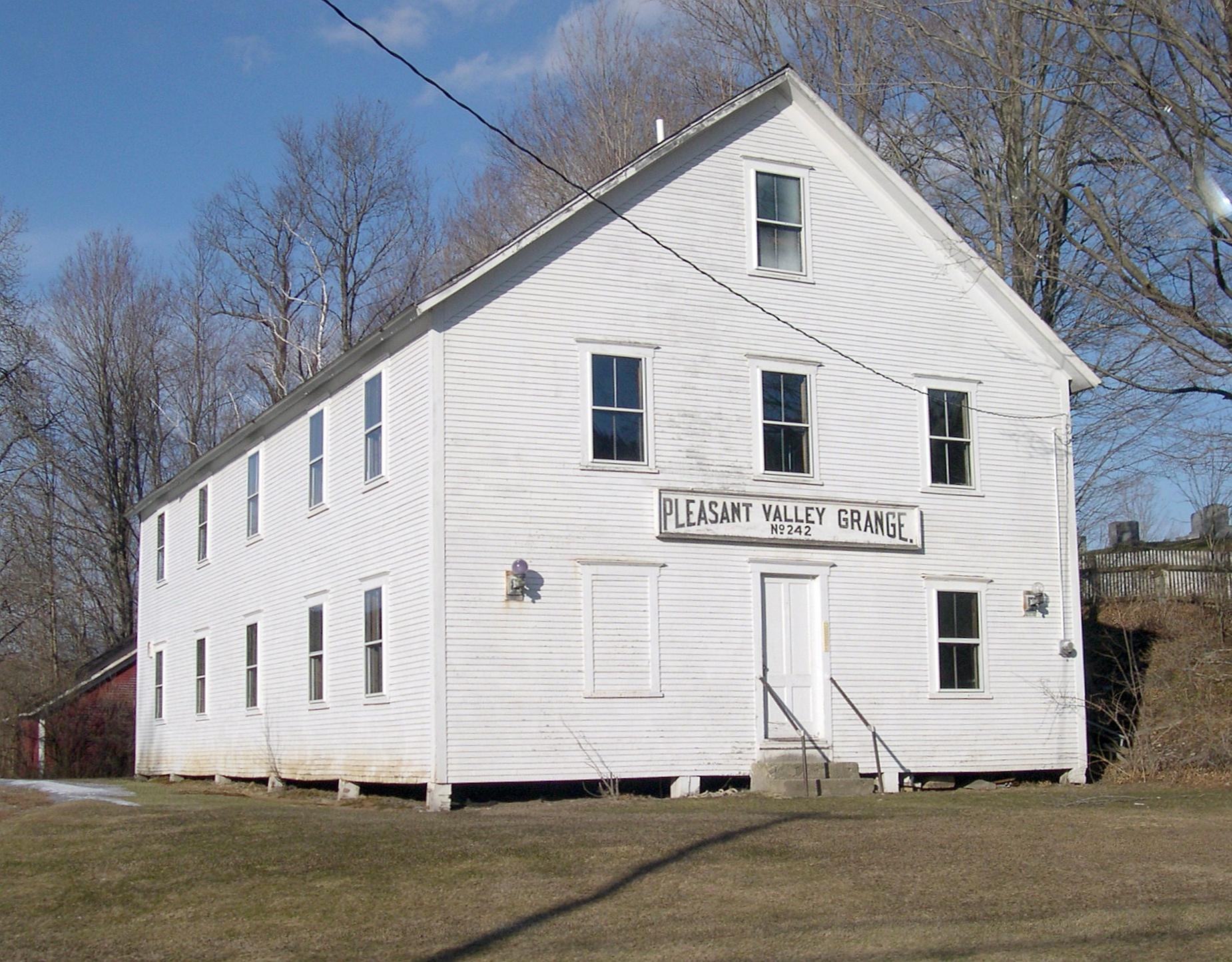
- Pleasant Valley Grange Hall, next to the Rockingham Meeting House

- Seal

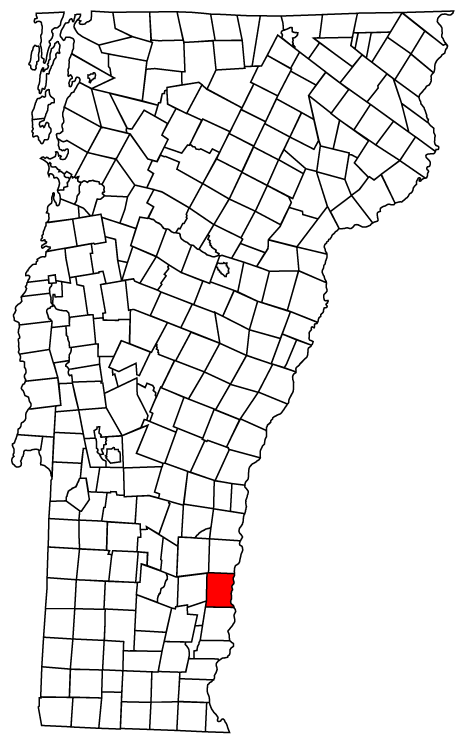
- Rockingham, Vermont
- Coordinates: 43°09′57″N 72°28′54″W
- Country: United States
- State: Vermont
- County: Windham
- Chartered: 1752
- Communities: Bellows Falls; Cambridgeport; Saxtons River

Area
  - Total: 42.3 sq mi (109.6 km^{2})
  - Land: 41.9 sq mi (108.5 km^{2})
  - Water: 0.42 sq mi (1.1 km^{2})
- Elevation: 988 ft (301 m)

Population (2020)
  - Total: 4,832
  - Density: 126/sq mi (48.7/km^{2})
- Time zone: UTC-5 (Eastern (EST))
  - Summer (DST): UTC-4 (EDT)
- ZIP Codes: 05101 (Bellows Falls); 05154 (Saxtons River); 05141 (Cambridgeport); 05143 (Chester)
- Area code: 802
- FIPS code: 50-60250
- GNIS feature ID: 1462189
- Website: www.rockinghamvt.org

Rockingham is a town along the Connecticut River in Windham County, Vermont, United States. As of the 2020 census, the population was 4,832. Rockingham includes the incorporated villages of Bellows Falls and Saxtons River, as well as a large rural area west of Interstate 91.

Rockingham has no formal town center; instead, town offices and the Rockingham Public Library are located in the village of Bellows Falls. The approximate center is the Rockingham Meeting House, passed by Route 103, a popular east–west route across the state. The Meeting House was built in Rockingham Village, once the main settlement in the town, but with the increased use of water power for manufacturing, population shifted to other villages located on the two rivers in the town. Most of what was left of Rockingham Village (over a dozen buildings, also called the Old Town) burned in a fire on April 14, 1908; the fire came close to the Meeting House but it was saved. The houses, hotel, and store that burned were not rebuilt.

== History ==
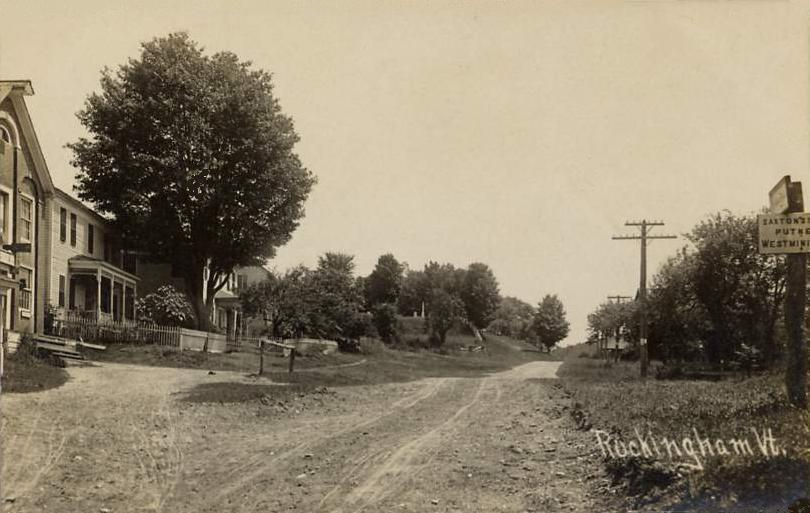
Street scene, Rockingham Village, c. 1908

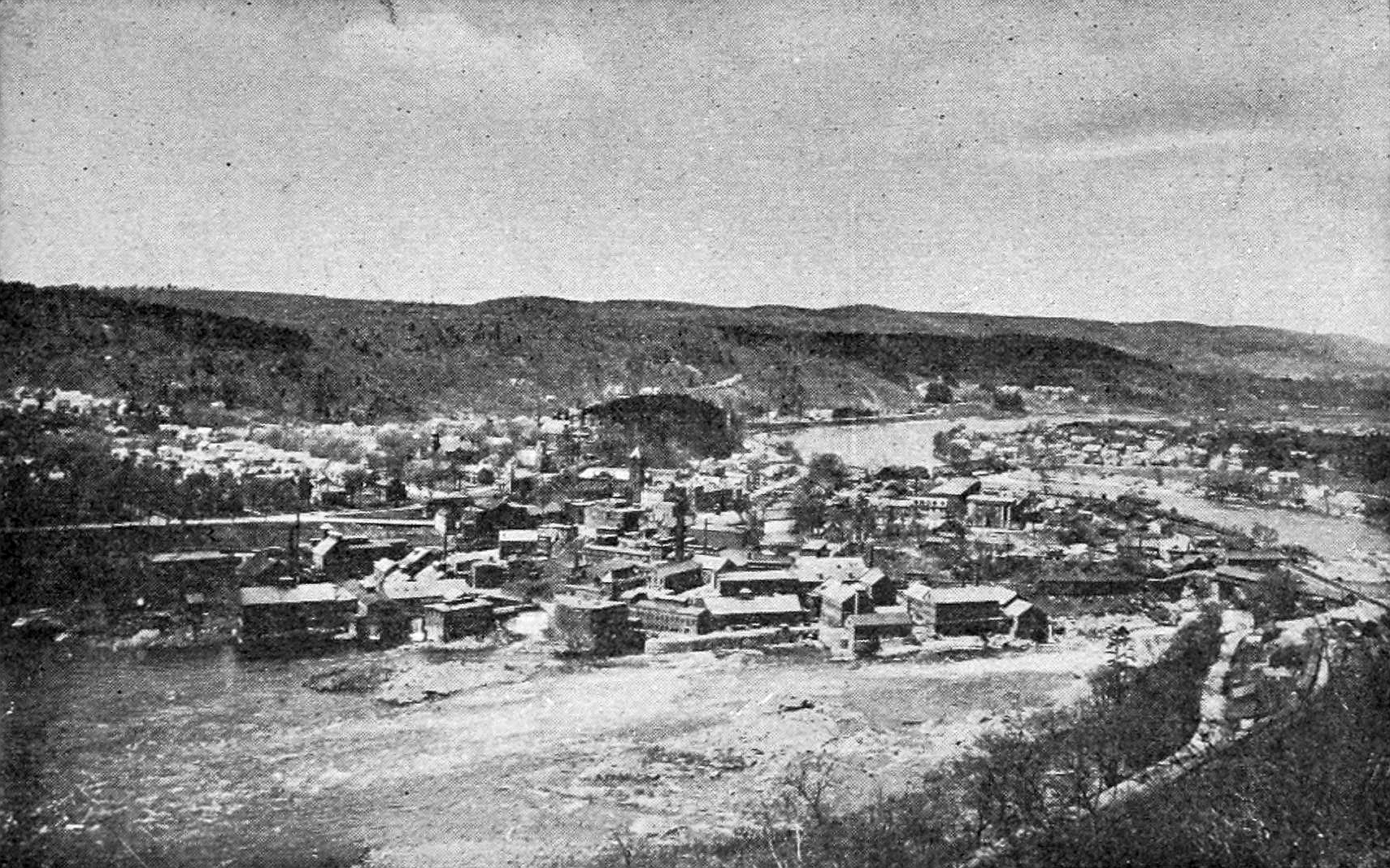
Bellows Falls Village, Rockingham, 1915

One of the New Hampshire grants, it was chartered by Governor Benning Wentworth on December 28, 1752, and named for Lord Rockingham. The township was granted to Samuel Johnson and 72 others. When the Town was first settled in 1753 by pioneers, its rivers were sites of fishing for salmon and shad, as they had been for the original indigenous inhabitants. By 1771, the population reached 225. In 1785, Colonel Enoch Hale erected the first bridge over the Connecticut River, and until 1796, it remained the only bridge across. The village of Bellows Falls became an important mill town, which reduced the runs of palatable fish.

== Geography ==
According to the United States Census Bureau, the town has a total area of 42.3 square miles (109.6 km^{2}), of which 41.9 square miles (108.5 km^{2}) is land and 0.4 square mile (1.1 km^{2}) (0.97%) is water. It is drained by the Williams and the Saxtons rivers, and several brooks that flow directly into the Connecticut River; the latter river forms the eastern boundary of Rockingham.

The highest point in town is Berry Hill at 478 m/1568 ft elevation, near the northwestern corner of the town. The lowest point is on the Connecticut River at the southern boundary of town, at 73 m/240 ft elevation.

The town is crossed by Interstate 91, U.S. Route 5, Vermont Route 103 and Vermont Route 121. The Bellows Falls train station was once served by three rail lines, and today it has Amtrak service on the Vermonter route, with two trains a day, one heading south to Washington, DC and one heading north to St. Albans, VT.

== Demographics ==
Historical population
Census	Pop.	Note	%±
1790	1,235		—
1800	1,684		36.4%
1810	1,954		16.0%
1820	2,155		10.3%
1830	2,272		5.4%
1840	2,330		2.6%
1850	2,837		21.8%
1860	2,904		2.4%
1870	2,854		−1.7%
1880	3,797		33.0%
1890	4,579		20.6%
1900	5,809		26.9%
1910	6,207		6.9%
1920	6,231		0.4%
1930	5,302		−14.9%
1940	5,737		8.2%
1950	5,499		−4.1%
1960	5,704		3.7%
1970	5,501		−3.6%
1980	5,538		0.7%
1990	5,484		−1.0%
2000	5,309		−3.2%
2010	5,282		−0.5%
2020	4,832		−8.5%
U.S. Decennial Census

The rural community, based on farming, had its peak of population in 1920.

As of the census of 2000, there were 5,309 people, 2,202 households, and 1,387 families residing in the town. The population density was 126.7 people per square mile (48.9/km^{2}). There were 2,425 housing units at an average density of 57.9 per square mile (22.3/km^{2}). The racial makeup of the town was 97.38% White, 0.34% African American, 0.09% Native American, 0.55% Asian, 0.06% Pacific Islander, 0.26% from other races, and 1.32% from two or more races. Hispanic or Latino of any race were 1.15% of the population.

There were 2,202 households, out of which 31.1% had children under the age of 18 living with them, 47.2% were couples living together and joined in either marriage or civil union, 12.0% had a female householder with no husband present, and 37.0% were non-families. 30.1% of all households were made up of individuals, and 13.4% had someone living alone who was 65 years of age or older. The average household size was 2.39 and the average family size was 2.96.

In the town, the population was spread out, with 25.1% under the age of 18, 6.8% from 18 to 24, 27.1% from 25 to 44, 25.5% from 45 to 64, and 15.4% who were 65 years of age or older. The median age was 39 years. For every 100 females, there were 93.8 males. For every 100 females age 18 and over, there were 88.6 males.

The median income for a household in the town was $33,423, and the median income for a family was $45,503. Males had a median income of $29,200 versus $22,944 for females. The per capita income for the town was $19,051. About 4.8% of families and 10.0% of the population were below the poverty line, including 13.5% of those under age 18 and 9.6% of those age 65 or over.

== Listed on National Register of Historic Places ==
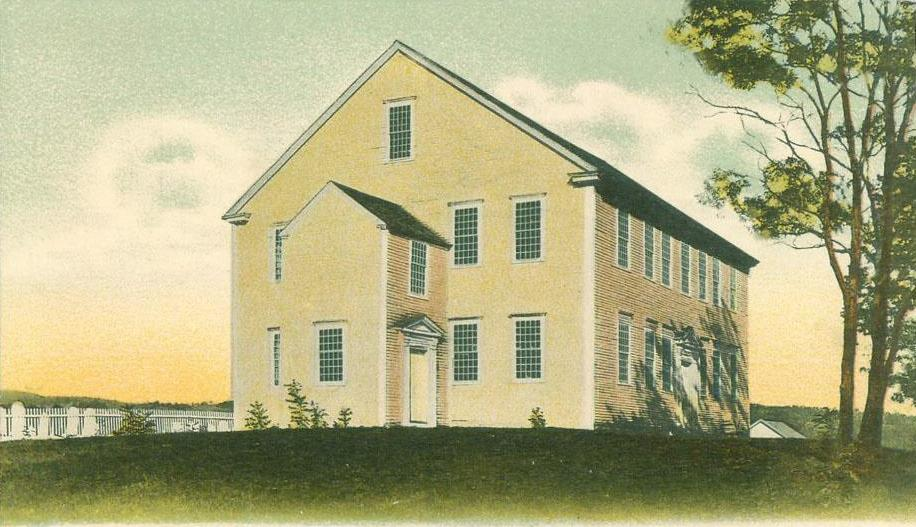
Rockingham Meeting House

- Bartonsville Covered Bridge – across the Williams River at the southern end of Bartonsville (added August 2, 1973)
- Worrall Covered Bridge – north of Rockingham across the Williams River (added August 16, 1973)
- Hall Covered Bridge – West of Bellows Falls across the Saxtons River, off Vermont Route 121 (added August 28, 1973)
- Parker Hill Rural Historic District – Parker Hill and Lower Parker Hill Roads (added June 20, 1993)
- Rockingham Meeting House – off Vermont Route 103 (added October 10, 1979)
- Rockingham Village Historic District – Meeting House Rd., Rockingham Hill Rd. (added January 4, 2008)
- Williams River Route 5 Bridge – U.S. Route 5 over the Williams River (added December 14, 1991)
- Adams Gristmill Warehouse – Bridge St., Bellows Falls (added January 22, 1990)
- Bellows Falls Co-operative Creamery Complex – Bridge St., Bellows Falls (added January 22, 1990)
- Bellows Falls Petroglyph Site (VT-WD-8) – Bridge St., Bellows Falls (added January 22, 1990)
- Bellows Falls Times Building – Bridge and Island streets, Bellows Falls (added January 22, 1990)
- Bellows Falls Downtown Historic District – Depot, Canal, Rockingham, Bridge, Mill, and Westminster Sts. (added August 16, 1982)
- Bellows Falls Neighborhood Historic District – Atkinson, Westminster, School, and Hapgood Sts., Hapgood Pl., and Burt St., Henry St., South St., Hadley St., and Temple Pl.; also Center, Front, Old Terrace, and Pine Sts., Bellows Falls (added January 17, 2002)
- Gas Station at Bridge and Island Streets – (added January 22, 1990)
- George-Pine-Henry Street Historic District – 5-22 George St.; 1-17 Pine St.; 32-44 Henry St., Bellows Falls (added July 13, 2010)
- Vermont Academy Campus Historic District – 10 Long Walk, Saxtons River (added July 14, 2015)
- Saxtons River Village Historic District – Roughly bounded by Burk Hill and Bellview Rds., Oak St., the Saxtons River, and Westminster West Rd. (added September 29, 1988)
- Miss Bellows Falls Diner – 90 Rockingham St., Bellows Falls (added February 15, 1983)
- Moore and Thompson Paper Mill Complex – Bridge St., Bellows Falls (added March 16, 1984)
- Oak Hill Cemetery Chapel – Off Pleasant St., Bellows Falls (added November 14, 1991)
- William A. Hall House – 1 Hapgood St., Bellows Falls (added May 5, 1999)
- Howard Hardware Storehouse – Bridge St., Bellows Falls (added January 22, 1990)
- Robertson Paper Company Complex – Island St., Bellows Falls (added January 22, 1990) It was demolished in 2018–19 as a Brownfields Economic Revitalization Alliance (BERA) project.
- Williams Street Extension Historic District – 51–58, 61–68, 70 Williams St., Bellows Falls (added July 13, 2010)
- Westminster Terrace Historic District – Along Westminster Terrace, in Bellows Falls and Westminster (added July 13, 2010)

== Locations ==
The following smaller unincorporated villages are within the town of Rockingham, in addition to its two larger, incorporated villages (Bellows Falls and Saxtons River):

- Bartonsville, a hamlet with mills established by Jeremiah Barton about 1840, once a stop on the Rutland Railroad
- Brockways Mills, a mill site and former stop on the Rutland Railroad
- Cambridgeport, a hamlet with mills named after J.T. Campbridge, partially within the town of Grafton

== Notable people ==
- John S. Barry, fourth governor of Michigan
- Henry Adams Bellows, lawyer, state legislator and jurist
- Jonathan Blanchard, pastor, social reformer, and president of Wheaton College
- Hetty Green, businesswoman and financier
- Hugh H. Henry, United States Marshal for Vermont
- Daniel Kellogg, Justice of the Vermont Supreme Court
- George Bradley Kellogg, Lieutenant Colonel in the American Civil War
- Selim Peabody, educator
- Zera Pulsipher, religious leader
- Shadrach Roundy, religious leader
- Henry Franklin Severens, judge
