= Robertson Paper Company Complex =

- U.S. National Register of Historic Places
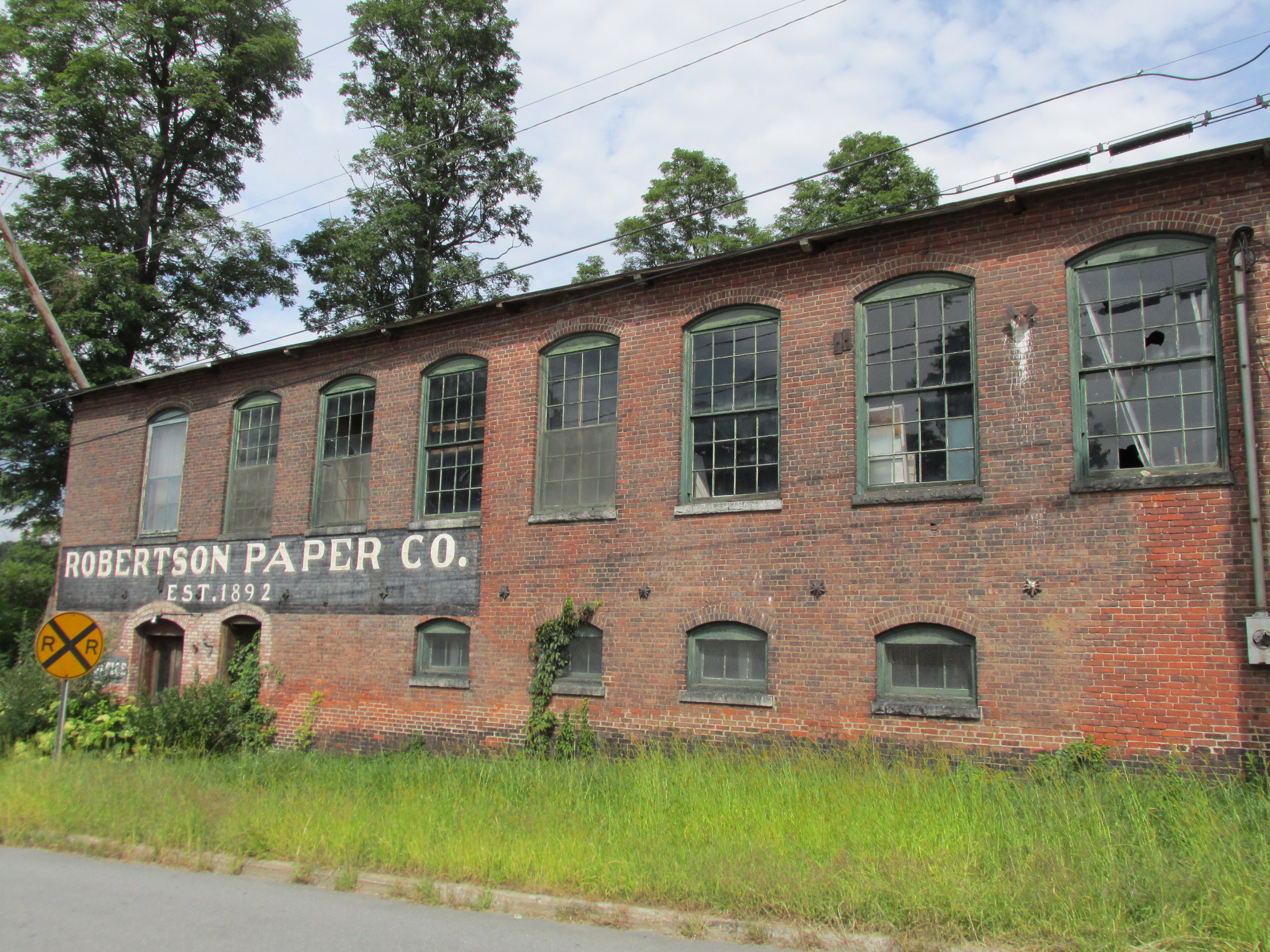

- Location within Vermont Location within the United States
- Location: Island St., Rockingham, Vermont
- Coordinates: 43°8′9″N 72°26′36″W
- Area: 2 acres (0.81 ha)
- Built: 1890
- MPS: Bellows Falls Island MRA
- NRHP reference No.: 88002165
- Added to NRHP: January 22, 1990

The Robertson Paper Company Complex was a historic industrial facility on Island Street in Bellows Falls, Vermont. It consisted of a collection of mostly-interconnected factory and related buildings, built between c. 1890 and c. 1960 by various paper-related companies. It was occupied and enlarged by the Robertson Paper Company between 1907 and its failure in 1987, at which time it was the longest-lived paper company in the state. The complex was listed on the National Register of Historic Places in 1990. It was demolished in 2018-19 as a Brownfields Economic Revitalization Alliance (BERA) project, with federal, state, and local funding.

== Description and history ==
The former Robertson Paper Company plant was located near the center of the island formed by the Connecticut River to the east and the Bellows Falls Canal to the west. The main factory, an interconnected group of eight structures, was located on the east side of Island Street, with the town's main rail yard to the north and the former Bellows Falls Co-operative Creamery Complex to the east. The building had long frontage along Island Street, which slopes downhill toward the rail yard, where a basement story was exposed. This northern section housed the company offices, which were accessed through entrances at the basement level. The southern end of the factory, which sported a monitor roof, was its main manufacturing area. Additional sections extended the building north and east, and included one section housing a freight elevator to bring goods down to the level of the rail yard.

The oldest portion of the complex, its main manufacturing area, was built about 1890 by C.W. Osgood and Son, a maker of papermaking machinery. Successors to this firm enlarged the premises, and were eventually merged into the Robertson Paper Company in 1907. Robertson was founded in 1881, and was at first engaged in the manufacture of tissue paper in a plant at the southern end of the island. It expanded into the manufacture of waxed paper, and was, at the time of its acquisition of this plant, one of the nation's largest manufacturers of that product. The firm remained in business at this site, under a variety of names and ownerships, until 1987, when it succumbed to bankruptcy. It was at that time the longest continuously operational paper company in the state.

== See also ==
- National Register of Historic Places listings in Windham County, Vermont
