= Williams Street Extension Historic District =

Historic district in Vermont, United States

- U.S. National Register of Historic Places
- U.S. Historic district
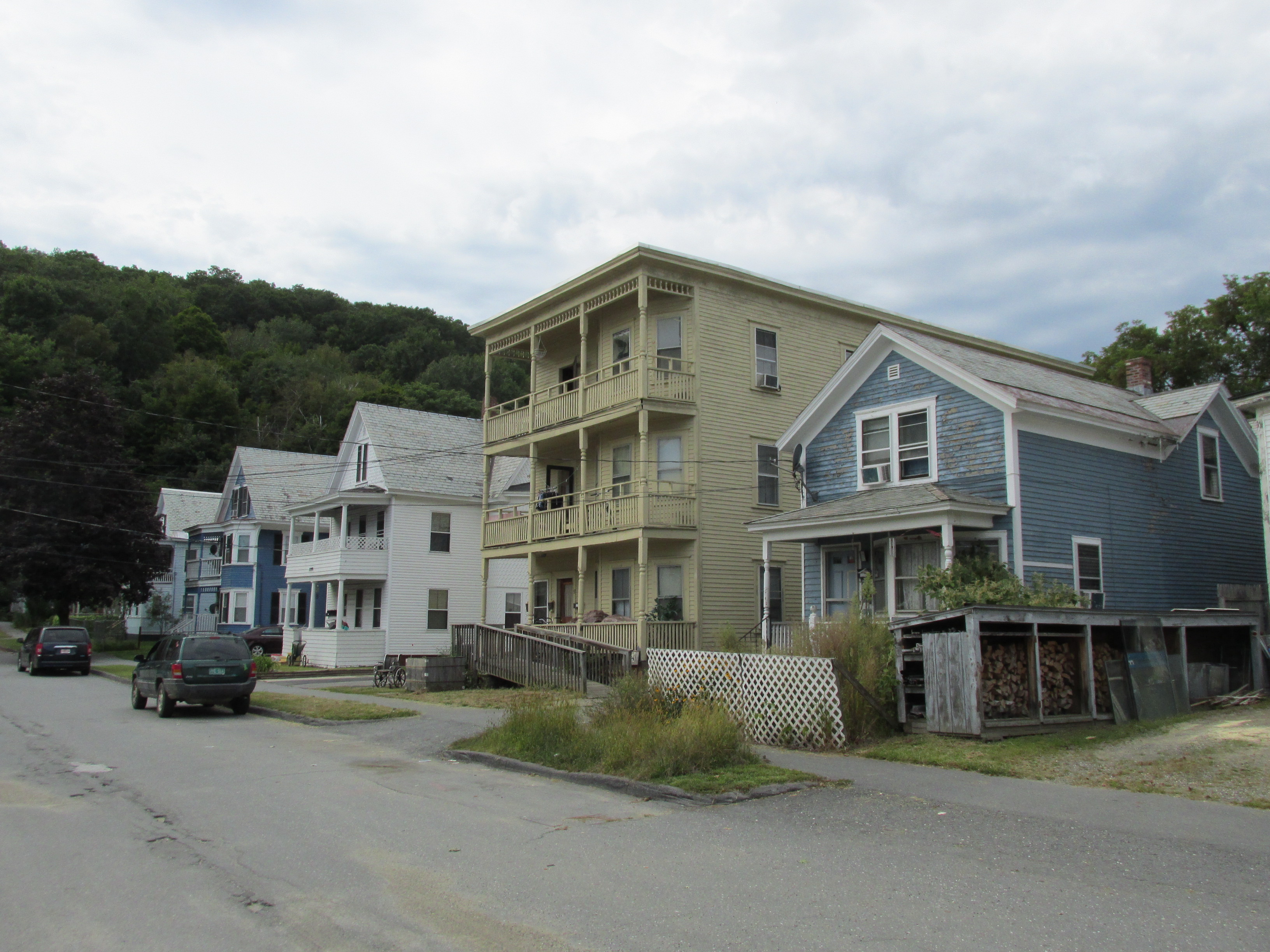

- Location within Vermont Location within the United States
- Location: 51-58, 61-68, 70 Williams St., Rockingham, Vermont
- Coordinates: 43°8′8″N 72°27′9″W
- Area: 2 acres (0.81 ha)
- Built: 1880
- NRHP reference No.: 09000893
- Added to NRHP: July 13, 2010

The Williams Street Extension Historic District encompasses a locally architecturally distinctive residential area on Williams Street in Bellows Falls, a village of Rockingham, Vermont. Developed between about 1880 and 1930, the neighborhood has a collection of 15 historically significant well-preserved worker housing units. It was listed on the National Register of Historic Places in 2010.

== Description and history ==
The Williams Street Extension is a residential dead end street in the northwestern part of Bellows Falls, running west from Atkinson Road (United States Route 5) to end at a steep hillside at its western end. Myrtle Street, another residential street, ends in a T junction roughly midway through its length. The street has eighteen primary residential structures, most of which are two or three story multiunit wood frame buildings. All have slate roofs, and most have wooden clapboard or shingle siding, although some have been clad in synthetic siding. They are basically vernacular in style, with elements of the Queen Anne revival predominant, although Greek Revival and Colonial Revival features are also found in a few buildings.

The Williams Street Extension was developed beginning about 1880, in order to address the need for worker housing in the industries of Bellows Falls, Rockingham's most populous and economically significant village. The area was platted out as early as 1872, when the land was owned by the Bellows Falls Canal Company. Between 1880 and 1900 twelve of the street's buildings were built, and the last major construction took place in 1920. Since then, only modest alterations have taken place, including the addition or loss of outbuildings, changes in siding materials, and minor alterations to building exteriors. Residents who lived here were typically employed either by the railroads that served the village, or the paper companies that had plants here.

== See also ==
- National Register of Historic Places listings in Windham County, Vermont
