= Howard Hardware Storehouse =

- U.S. National Register of Historic Places
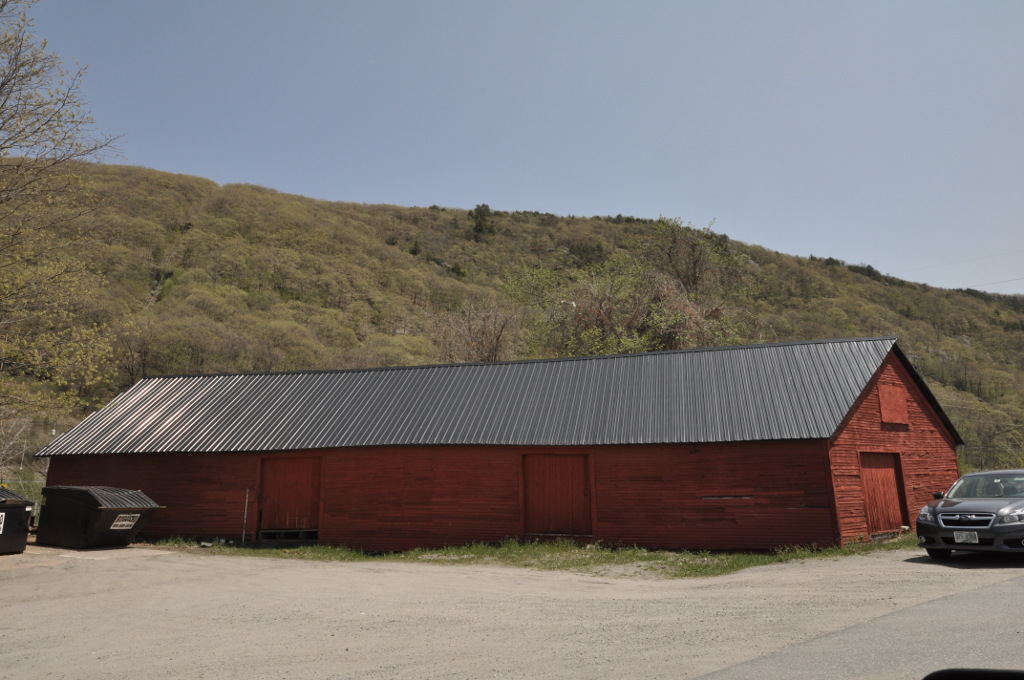

- Location within Vermont Location within the United States
- Location: Bridge St., Bellows Falls, Vermont
- Coordinates: 43°8′9″N 72°26′27″W
- Area: less than one acre
- Built: 1895
- Architectural style: Tetrahedral plan
- MPS: Bellows Falls Island MRA
- NRHP reference No.: 88002163
- Added to NRHP: January 22, 1990

The Howard Hardware Storehouse is a historic storage building off Bridge Street in Bellows Falls, Vermont. Built about 1895, it is a surviving reminder of the city's railroad-related economic past, built in a distinctive tetrahedral shape to accommodate nearby railroad lines. It was listed on the National Register of Historic Places in 1990.

== Description and history ==
The Howard Hardware Storehouse is located on the far eastern side of the island formed by the Connecticut River to the east, and the Bellows Falls Canal to the west. It is set north of Bridge Street, east of a modern service station, which separates it from the Adams Gristmill Warehouse, another historic rail-related storage facility. Immediately to its north runs the railroad line of the Boston and Maine Railroad, shortly before it crosses the river into New Hampshire. To its west runs the curving route of a former railroad siding, the tracks now removed, that gave access to the rail yard on the north end of the island. Because of these two lines, the building has a tetrahedral rather than rectangular shape. It is a 1-1/2 story frame structure, with a gable roof and clapboard siding. It is mounted on granite piers, and is oriented with its primary gabled facade facing the former siding to the west. This facade, and the eastern one, each have a single sliding freight door made of beaded vertical boarding; there are also two freight doors on the long north facade.

The warehouse was built about 1895, and was originally attached to a coal shed and second storehouse (neither still standing) that belonged to the hardware and farm supply business of L.G. and C.E. Howard, whose retail location was in the main square of Bellows Falls. This location provided easy means for the business to offload goods shipped by rail, and transport them to its store. The building is one of a small number of surviving vernacular commercial structures related to Bellows Falls' railroad-influenced past.

According to Cutter's New England Families Genealogical and Memorial (1914), L.G. Howard was born in Lunenburg, Mass in 1822 and was by trade a blacksmith. In 1848, Luther came to Bellows Falls to work in a livery stable, returning to Massachusetts some years later to furnish wood to locomotives and to run a lumber business in Paxton, Mass. In 1877, he returned to Bellows Falls and began working with his son Charles Elliott as hardware dealers. He later was selectman, the first president of the New Bellows Falls Building Association, and a major property owner in Bellows Falls, including the Hotel Windham. Charles was treasurer of the village for 15 years, represented the town in the state legislature, and vice president of the Bellows Falls Trust Company and the Rockingham Hospital Association. In 1895, Luther gave the village of Bellows Falls ten thousand dollars as a memorial to his wife to assist the poor of the village; the Sarah Burr Howard Memorial Fund was dissolved in 2013.

== See also ==
- National Register of Historic Places listings in Windham County, Vermont
