= Parker Hill Rural Historic District =

Historic district in Vermont, United States

- U.S. National Register of Historic Places
- U.S. Historic district
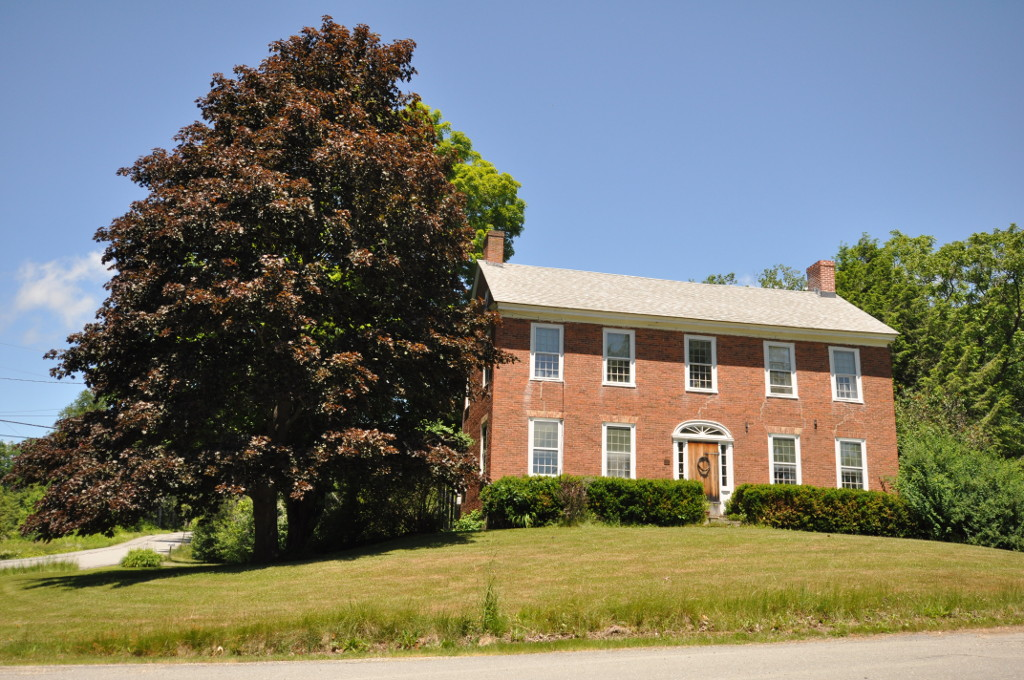
- A Federal period brick house at Parker Hill and Lawrence Roads

- Location within Vermont Location within the United States
- Location: Parker Hill and Lower Parker Hill Rds., Springfield, Vermont
- Coordinates: 43°13′25″N 72°28′46″W
- Area: 2,000 acres (810 ha)
- Architect: Dana, Thomas
- Architectural style: Italianate, Federal
- NRHP reference No.: 93000431
- Added to NRHP: May 20, 1993

The Parker Hill Rural Historic District encompasses a large (2,000-acre (810 ha)) rural agricultural landscape in eastern Windham and Windsor counties in the US state of Vermont. Roughly centered on Parker Hill Road in northern Rockingham and southern Springfield, the district exhibits a history of 200 years of farming, including a collection of Federal period farm housing. The district was listed on the National Register of Historic Places in 1993.

== Description and history ==
The Parker Hill area is broadly defined by Parker Hill Road to the west and Obrien and Lower Parker Hill Roads to the east, which run from the Williams River in Rockingham, north to Seavers Brook, a tributary of the Black River. Parker Hill Road traverses a ridge that rises several hundred feet above the valley floor of the Williams River. The landscape today is that of an agricultural and post-agricultural area, with some of its historic farms still operating, but with many abandoned fields that are reverting to mixed forest. These fields are typically divided by stone walls created in the late 18th and early 19th centuries, when the land was first cleared for cultivation. Stone walls also tend to line the few public roads through the area.

The district includes 25 farm properties, and a number of smaller parcels, typically subdivided from those farms, on which summer houses have been built. The farm complexes are mostly detached, with a farmhouse and several outbuildings. The houses are typically vernacular interpretations of late Georgian and Federal period styling, executed in wood or brick; one farmhouse has modest Italianate elements. Four of the houses have second-floor ballrooms, a sign of the builder's prosperity. In addition to the surviving farmsteads, the area is dotted with the remnants of abandoned farmsteads, in some cases limited to the presence of foundations and cellar holes. Although some farms continue to operate in the area today, many of these properties are now used as seasonal residences.

== See also ==
- National Register of Historic Places listings in Windham County, Vermont
- National Register of Historic Places listings in Windsor County, Vermont
