= Bellows Falls Times Building =

- U.S. National Register of Historic Places
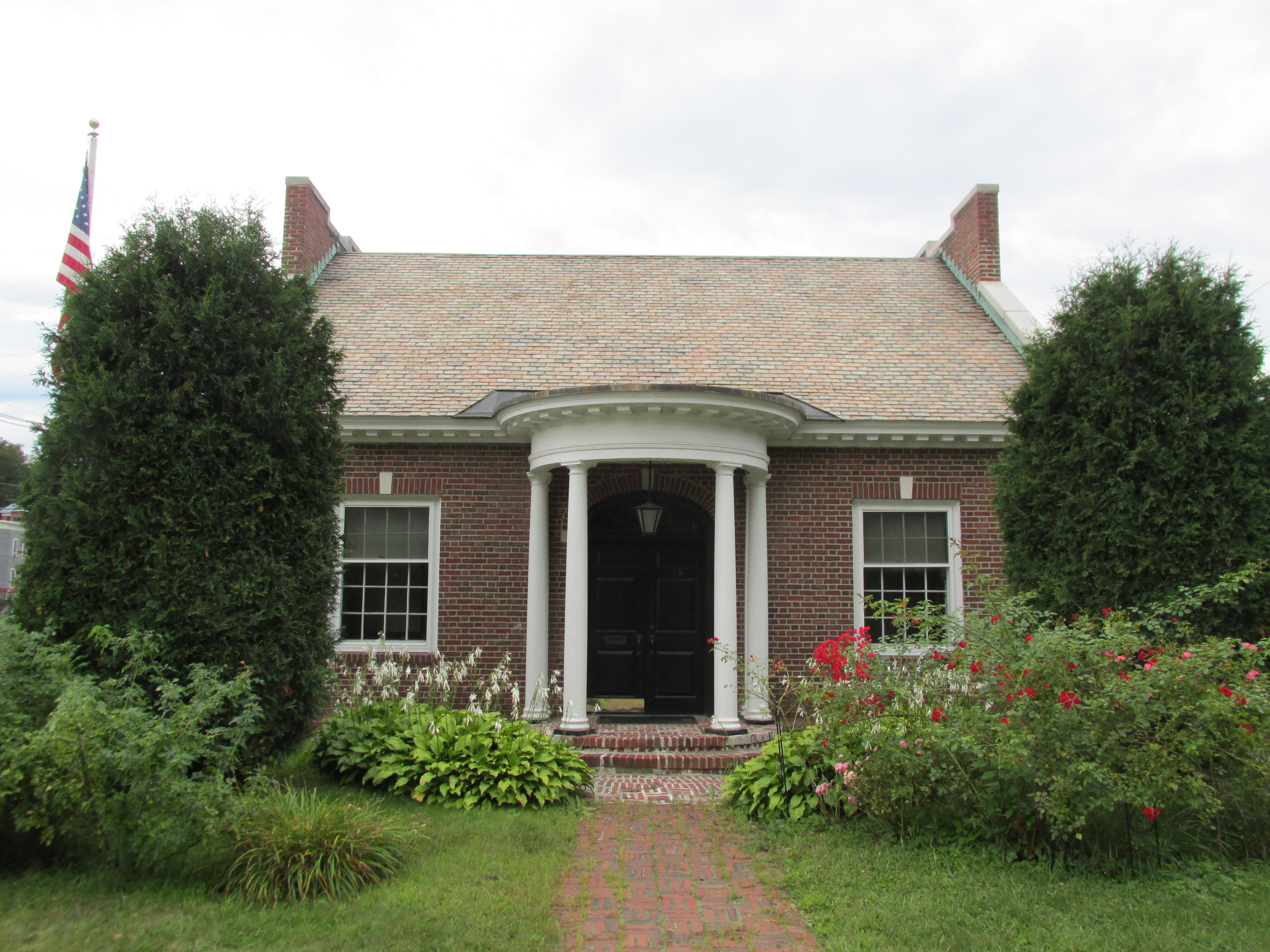

- Location within Vermont Location within the United States
- Location: Bridge and Island Sts., Rockingham, Vermont
- Coordinates: 43°8′4.7″N 72°26′33.5″W
- Area: less than one acre
- Built: 1931
- Architect: Harold Holmes Owen
- Architectural style: Colonial Revival
- MPS: Bellows Falls Island MRA
- NRHP reference No.: 88002160
- Added to NRHP: January 22, 1990

The Bellows Falls Times Building is a historic newspaper plant on Bridge and Island Streets in Bellows Falls, Vermont. The complex of three buildings was developed in the 1930s by the Vermont Newspaper Corporation, and served as home for the Bellows Falls Times newspaper until 1965, when it was consolidated with other local newspapers. The main building is a particularly fine local example of Colonial Revival design. The complex was listed on the National Register of Historic Places in 1990.

The building complex is located on the west side of the island formed by the Connecticut River and the Bellows Falls Canal. The main building faces south toward Bridge Street, on the east side of the canal, with a warehouse to its north. A small wood frame former garage building stands east of the warehouse, fronting on Island Street.

== Architecture ==
The main building is a single-story brick structure, which is particularly notable for its front facade. The brick is laid in Flemish bond, trimmed with stone and concrete elements. A semicircular portico shelters the main entrance, with Tuscan columns supporting a modillioned cornice. The side gables have stepped ends in the Dutch Revival fashion. An ell to the rear of this building has a shed roof, and plainer styling, with a former railroad access bay at the end now enclosed to form a secondary entrance.

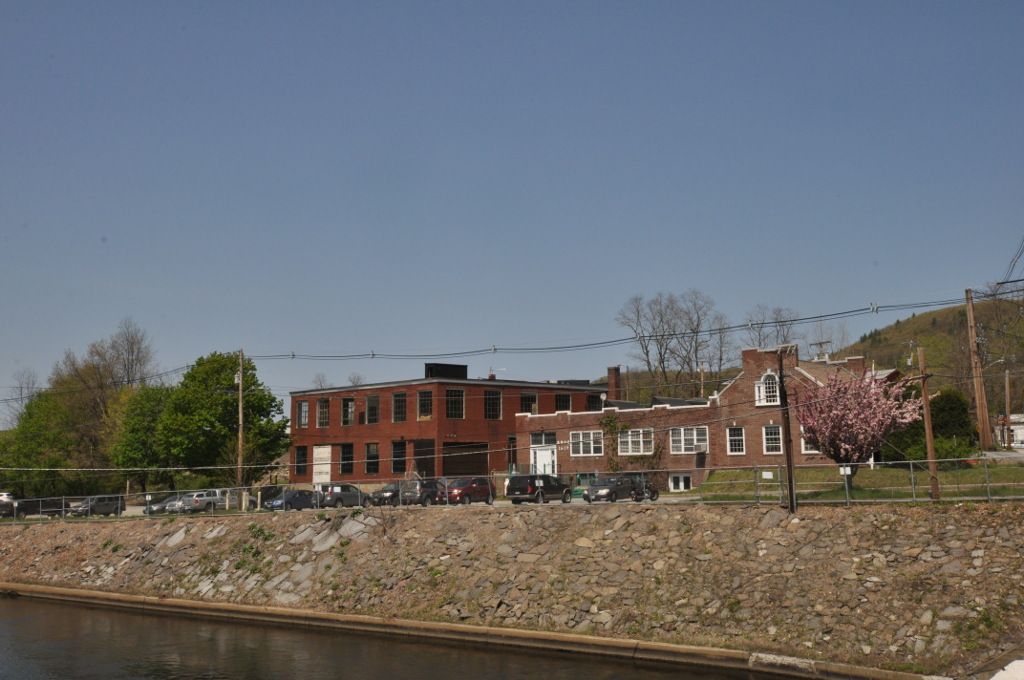

The warehouse is a two-story frame structure, with vertical board siding, and two rail access bays on its western (canal-facing) facade. The east facade has overhead doors for freight truck access, and also has a pedestrian entrance. The garage is a two-part structure, one with a gabled roof, the other with a parapeted flat roof.

== History ==
This complex of buildings was built in the early 1930s by the Vermont Newspaper Company, publisher of the Bellows Falls Times, a weekly newspaper, as well as weeklies in other nearby communities. It was built after its previous offices in the main square were destroyed by fire. The main building was designed by Concord, New Hampshire architect Harold Holmes Owen, and is one of Bellows Falls' most fully realized examples of Colonial Revival architecture. The complex was used by the publisher until 1965, when its operations were consolidated with those of other area publishers. The buildings have since been adaptively reused by other types of businesses.

== See also ==
- National Register of Historic Places listings in Windham County, Vermont
