= Bellows Falls Co-operative Creamery Complex =

- U.S. National Register of Historic Places
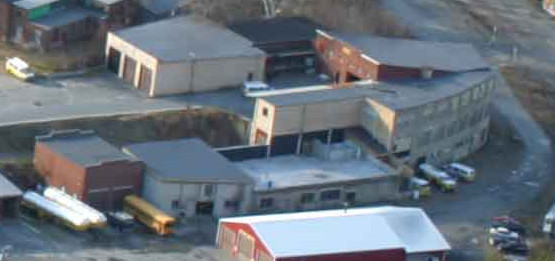
- A birds eye view of the creamery in 2006.

- Location within Vermont Location within the United States
- Location: Bridge St., Rockingham, Vermont
- Coordinates: 43°8′10.4″N 72°26′32″W
- Area: less than one acre
- Built: 1918
- Built by: Robie Construction Co.
- MPS: Bellows Falls Island MRA
- NRHP reference No.: 88002164
- Added to NRHP: January 22, 1990

The Bellows Falls Co-operative Creamery Complex is a historic industrial property in Bellows Falls, Vermont. Developed over a period of about 40 years beginning c. 1906, the complex, with two surviving buildings, it represents one of Vermont's largest commercial enterprises of the period. The property, located on the eastern side of Bellows Falls Island, was listed on the National Register of Historic Places in 1990.

== Description and history ==
The former Bellows Falls Creamery is located on the eastern part of the island formed by the Connecticut River and Bellows Falls Canal. It is located just south of the rail yard on the northern part of the island, and north of the Adams Gristmill Warehouse. It consists of one large multi-component building, three stories at its tallest, and an adjacent heating plant. The main building has openings to the rail yard to the north, and a drive accesses the complex from Bridge Street to the south at a higher elevation. Its main sections, three stories in height, are built of concrete with brick and other exterior finishes. Added sections give the building a U shape, with the opening to the south. Immediately southeast of the southeastern leg of the U stands the two-story brick heating plant.

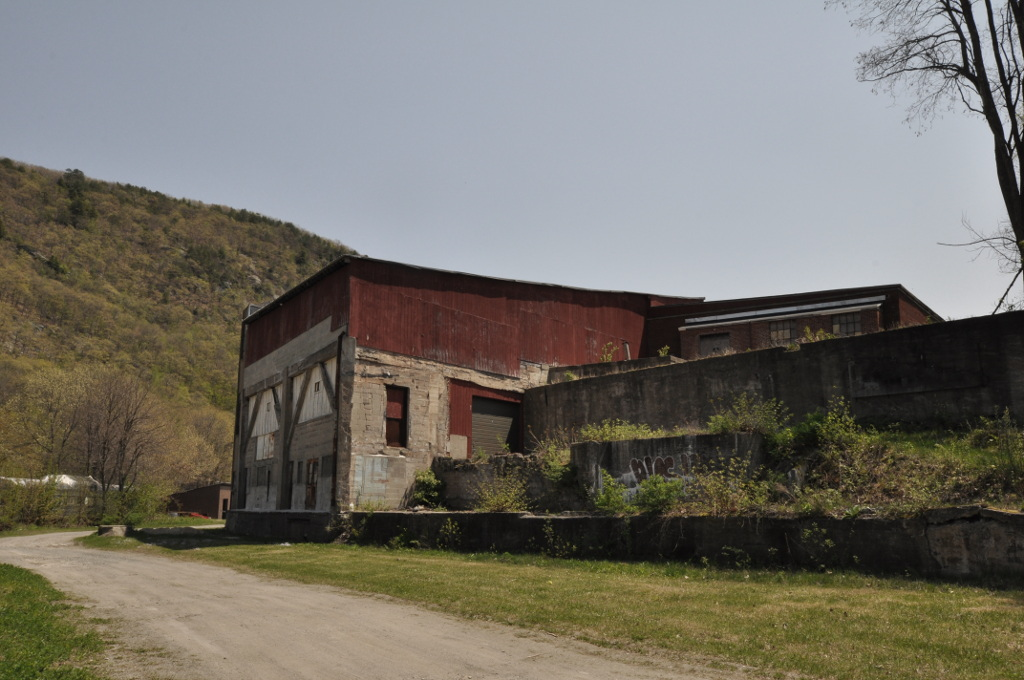

The first creamery established in Bellows Falls was a two-story wood-frame structure built by the Boston Dairy Company about 1906. The main building of the surviving creamery complex was built about 1918 by the Liberty Paper Company, and both buildings were acquired by the Bellows Falls Co-operative Creamery in 1921.Th is business, which processed milk from more than 200 member farmers, shipped milk products to market in Boston, Massachusetts by rail. In 1932 the plant was expanded, replacing the 1906 building with a larger modern structure, now part of the main building. The company remained successful, growing its plant over the following decades. In 1964, however, it lost its contract with Finast, a major regional grocery chain, and ceased operations in 1965. While part of the building's first and third floors are now being used as offices and storage for the Cota & Cota Oil Company, the rest of the buildings stand vacant and have been for many years thereafter, suffering from neglect, vandalism, and fires that destroyed one wing and part of the main building. Despite that, the buildings represent a major reminder of an important element of Vermont's economy in the early 20th century.

== See also ==
- National Register of Historic Places listings in Windham County, Vermont
