= George–Pine–Henry Street Historic District =

Historic district in Vermont, United States

- U.S. National Register of Historic Places
- U.S. Historic district
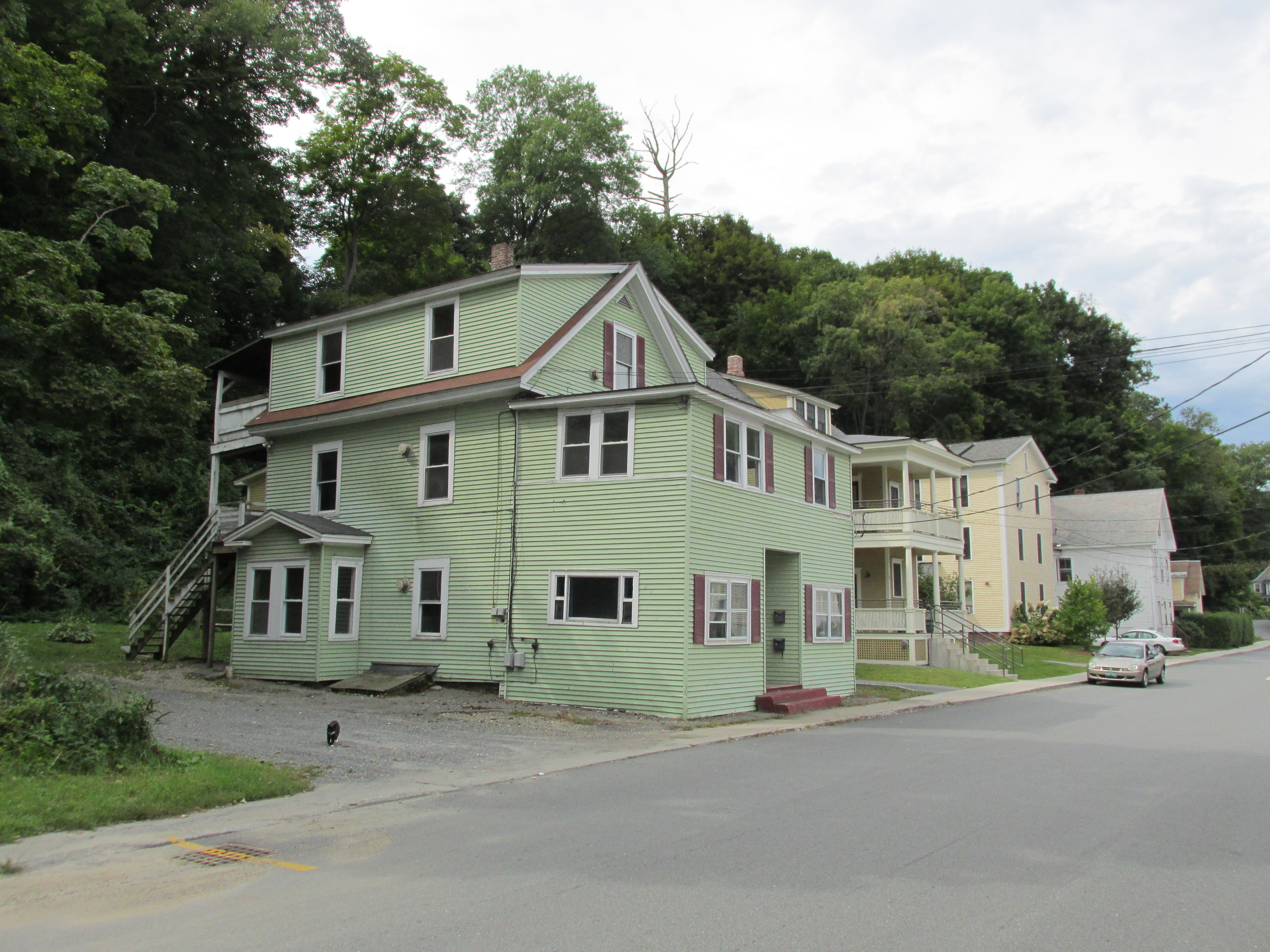
- Pine Street view

- Location within Vermont Location within the United States
- Location: 5-22 George St.; 1-17 Pine St.; 32-44 Henry St., Bellows Falls, Vermont
- Coordinates: 43°7′52″N 72°27′2″W
- Area: 4.2 acres (1.7 ha)
- Architectural style: Federal, Greek Revival
- NRHP reference No.: 09000918
- Added to NRHP: July 13, 2010

The George–Pine–Henry Historic District encompasses a residential area of the village of Bellows Falls, Vermont. Located west of downtown Bellows Falls, the area has a significant concentration of well-preserved late 19th and early 20th-century residences. It was listed on the National Register of Historic Places in 2010.

== Description and history ==
Bellows Falls is an incorporated village within the municipality of Rockingham in southeastern Vermont. It is located on the west bank of Connecticut River, and was the site at which that river was first bridged, in 1785. As a consequence, the village has since then been a transportation hub, as a nexus of water, road, and railroad routes formed there over the course of the 19th century. Industrial development grew in part due to the Bellows Falls Canal, which provided water power to a variety of industries. The village downtown grew immediately west of the canal and the primary industrial area, and its residential neighborhoods grew west and south of the downtown.

The George–Pine–Henry area is located west of the village's first major residential area (encompassed by the Bellows Falls Neighborhood Historic District), which saw significant development mainly in the 19th century. This area is roughly rectangular in shape, bounded by Pine, Burt, George, and Atkinson Streets. Houses are closely spaced, 1-1/2 to 3 stories in height, with wood frame construction. Stylistically they include examples of Greek Revival, Queen Anne, and Colonial Revival architecture, generally in vernacular interpretations. The most elaborate architectural example is probably the three-story Queen Anne Victorian at 6 George Street, which has a turret typical of the style, as well as bands of fish-scale shingling on its walls. The district has 27 historic contributing properties, and five non-contributing properties.

== See also ==
- National Register of Historic Places listings in Windham County, Vermont
