= Worrall Covered Bridge =

- U.S. National Register of Historic Places
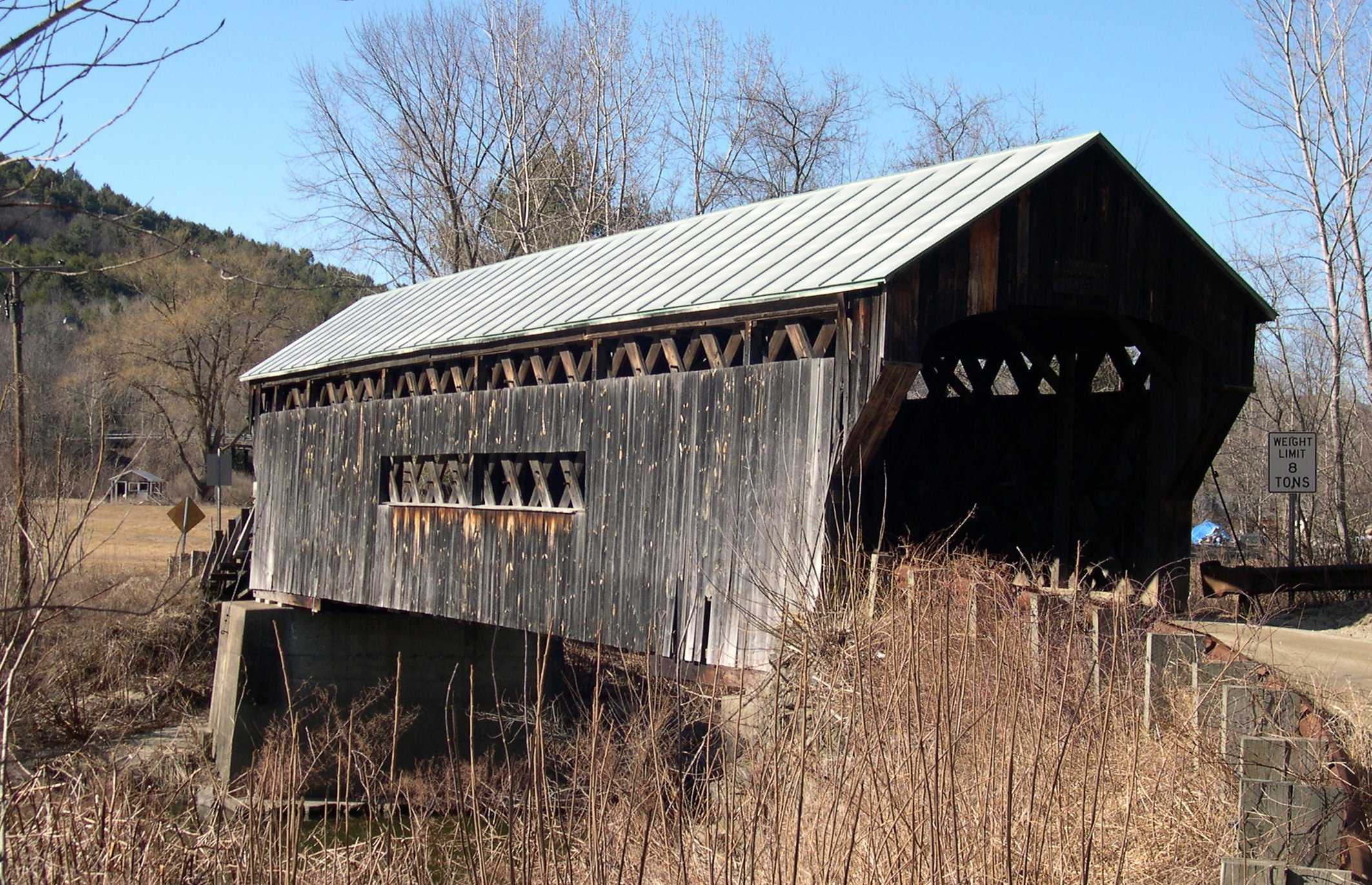
- The southeast approach to the Worrall bridge. Note the rare wooden ramp on the opposite end.

- Location within Vermont Location within the United States
- Nearest city: Rockingham, Vermont
- Coordinates: 43°12′41.77″N 72°32′8.74″W
- Area: less than one acre
- Built: 1870
- Architect: Granger, Sanford
- Architectural style: Town lattice truss
- NRHP reference No.: 73000209
- Added to NRHP: July 16, 1973

The Worrall Covered Bridge, also known as the Woralls Bridge or Worral Bridge, is a wooden covered bridge carrying Williams Road across the Williams River in Rockingham, Vermont, United States. Built about 1870, it is the only surviving 19th-century covered bridge in the town, after the Hall Covered Bridge collapsed in 1980 and was replaced in 1982, and the Bartonsville Covered Bridge was washed away by Hurricane Irene in 2011 and replaced in 2012-2013. The bridge was listed on the National Register of Historic Places in 1973. The bridge was damaged by the flooding on July 10, 2023, and the town decided almost a year later to repair it with FEMA funds.

== Description and history ==
The Worrall Covered Bridge is located on Williams Road, a dirt road a short distance north of Vermont Route 103, that generally parallels the Williams River on its north side, while VT 103 follows the river on the south side. The bridge is a Town lattice truss structure, with a total span of 82 feet (25 m) and a total structure length of 87 feet (27 m). The trusses rest on stone abutments that have been reinforced with concrete, and the road bed (14 feet (4.3 m) wide, or one lane) has been reinforced with laminated beams. It is topped by a gabled metal roof, and is sheathed in vertical board siding, with openings on its south side to improve traffic visibility. The bridge includes one rare feature — a wooden ramp leading up to the northwest entrance.

The bridge was built in 1870 by Sanford Granger, a local master builder. Of seventeen 19th-century bridges once located in the town, it is the only one that remains. At the time of its National Register listing in 1973, there were three such bridges in Rockingham, but the other two have since been destroyed and replaced with new covered bridges (see above).

== See also ==
- National Register of Historic Places listings in Windham County, Vermont
- List of bridges on the National Register of Historic Places in Vermont
- List of covered bridges in Vermont
