= Williams River Route 5 Bridge =

- U.S. National Register of Historic Places
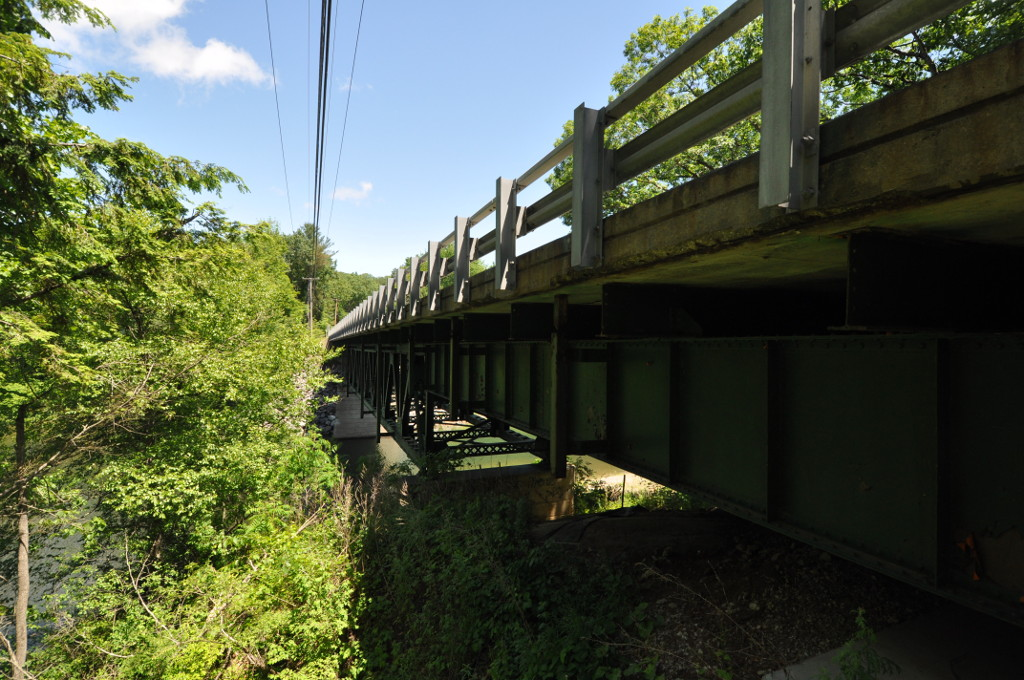
- View of the trusses below the bridge deck

- Location within Vermont Location within the United States
- Location: US 5 over the Williams River, Rockingham, Vermont
- Coordinates: 43°10′57″N 72°27′36″W
- Area: less than one acre
- Built: 1929
- Architectural style: Warren deck truss bridge
- MPS: Metal Truss, Masonry, and Concrete Bridges in Vermont MPS
- NRHP reference No.: 91001603
- Added to NRHP: November 14, 1991

The Williams River Route 5 Bridge is a historic Warren deck truss bridge, carrying U.S. Route 5 (US 5) across the Williams River in Rockingham, Vermont. Built in 1929 and rebuilt in 1971-72, it is one of four bridges of this type and vintage in the state. It was listed on the National Register of Historic Places in 1991.

== Description and history ==
The Williams River Bridge is located in central eastern Rockingham, not far above the mouth of the Williams River, where it empties into the Connecticut River. The bridge has a total length of about 250 feet (76 m), consisting of a 137-foot (42 m) main span and approach spans of 56 feet (17 m) and 24 feet (7.3 m). The main span is a Warren deck truss, mounted on concrete abutments, with an I-beam sub-floor and concrete road bed set on top of the truss structure. The approaches are supported by I-section plate girders.

The bridge was built in 1929, one of many bridges built in the wake of flooding that devastated Vermont in 1927. It is one of only four Warren deck trusses built at the time, serving on what was one of the state's major travel arteries prior to the construction of Interstate 91. These trusses were typically used by the state on some its longest spans, and sites where the clearance below allowed for the truss placement. The state standardized on these types of trusses during the 1928-30 construction period, and continues to use them for new bridge construction.

== See also ==
- National Register of Historic Places listings in Windham County, Vermont
- List of bridges on the National Register of Historic Places in Vermont
