= Gas Station at Bridge and Island Streets =

- U.S. National Register of Historic Places
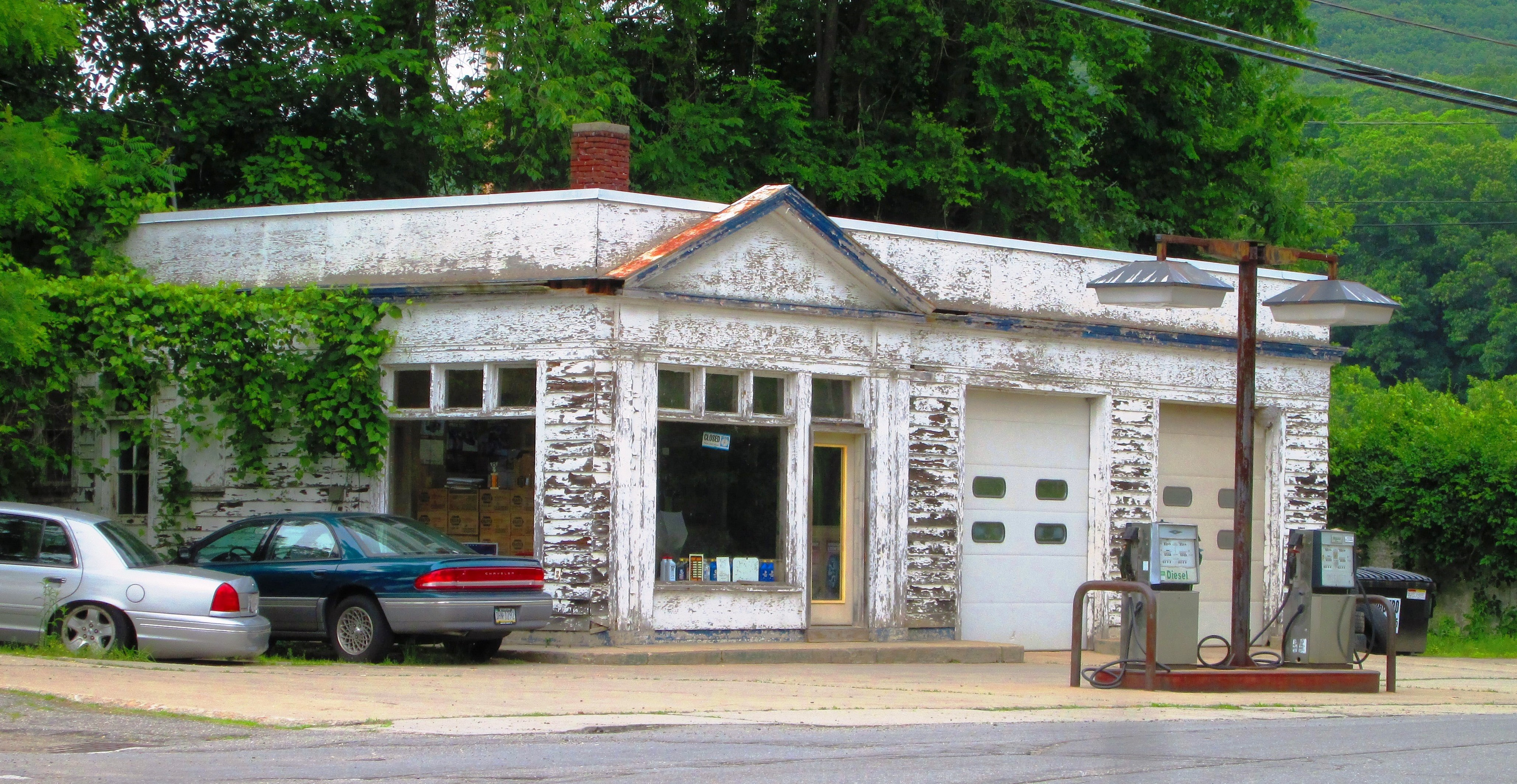
- (2017)

- Location within Vermont Location within the United States
- Location: Bridge and Island Streets; Bellows Falls, Vermont
- Coordinates: 43°7′54″N 72°26′56″W
- Built: 1935
- Architectural style: Colonial Revival
- MPS: Bellows Falls Island MRA
- NRHP reference No.: 88002161
- Added to NRHP: January 22, 1990

The Gas Station at Bridge and Island Streets is a historic automotive service station in Bellows Falls, Vermont. Built about 1935, it is a modest yet well-preserved example of period roadside commercial architecture of the period. The Colonial Revival building continues to be used as a service facility; it was listed on the National Register of Historic Places in 1990.

== Description and history ==
The gas station is located south of the center of the island formed by the Connecticut River and the Bellows Falls Canal, east of the Bellows Falls downtown area. It is set at the northeastern corner of the Island and Bridge Streets, the two main roads that traverse the island. It is a single-story frame structure, with a flat roof and clapboard siding. It has an office area to the left, highlighted by pilasters and a gabled top, and there are two vehicle bays to the right, each with a modern overhead door. The office area has a plate glass window to the left and a pedestrian entrance to the right, each topped by transom windows. The roof once sported a cupola, of which only the square base remains after it was blown off in a storm.

The gas station was built about 1935, about five years after the nearby Vilas Bridge, spanning the river, was built. Along with the bridge, it represents the trend of that period of increasing road and highway transportation, and is a well-preserved example of vernacular Colonial Revival architecture. Gas stations of this vintage are particularly rare in Vermont.

== See also ==
- National Register of Historic Places listings in Windham County, Vermont
