= Cambridgeport, Vermont =

- Village
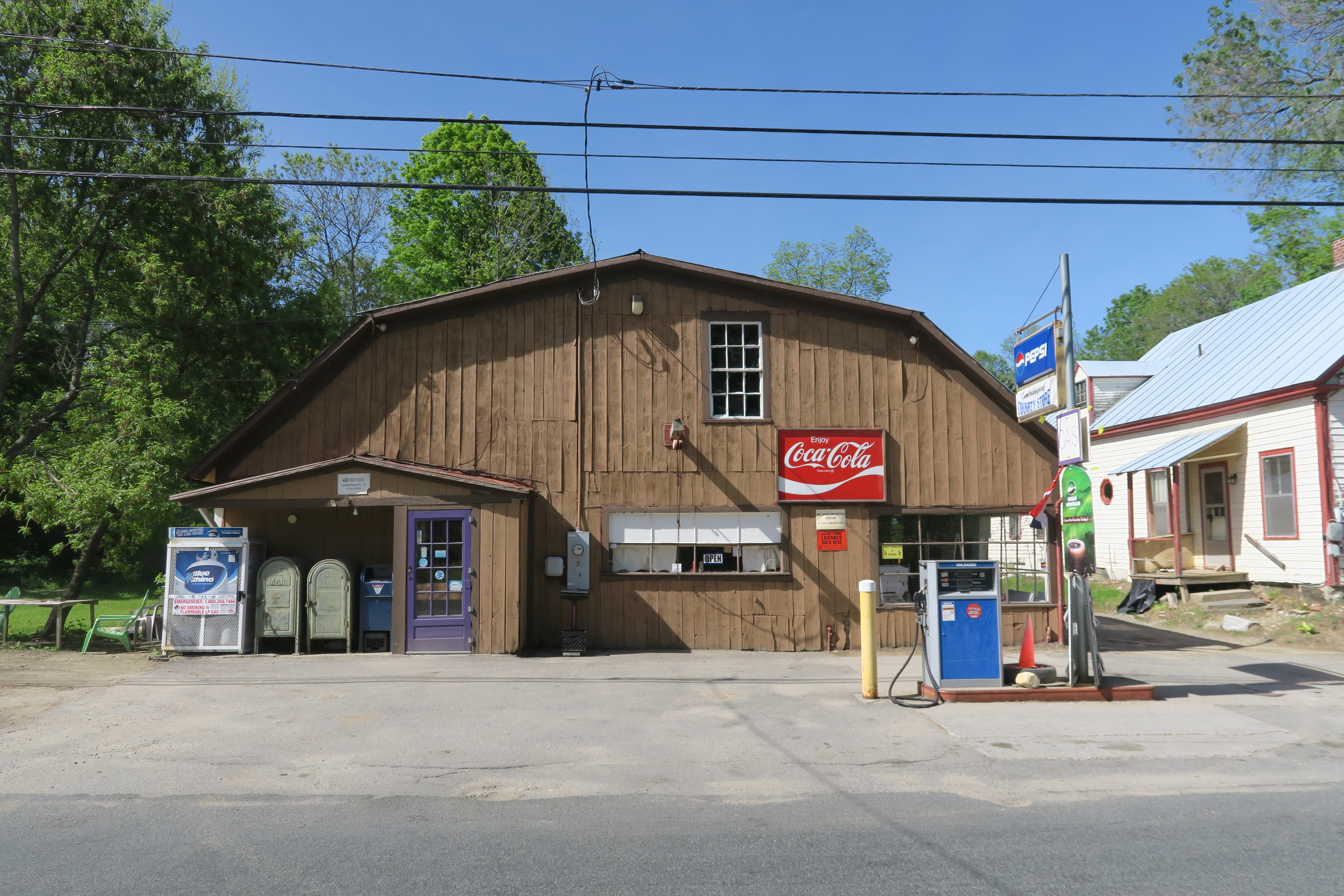
- Cambridgeport Country Store and Post Office

- Location within Vermont
- Coordinates: 43°09′05″N 72°33′37″W
- Country: United States
- State: Vermont
- County: Windham
- Elevation: 614 ft (187 m)
- Time zone: UTC-5 (Eastern (EST))
  - Summer (DST): UTC-4 (EDT)
- ZIP code: 05141
- Area code: 802
- GNIS feature ID: 1456723

Cambridgeport is an unincorporated village in the town of Rockingham, Windham County, Vermont, United States. The community is located at the intersection of Vermont routes 35 and 121, 2.7 miles (4.3 km) west-northwest of Saxtons River. Cambridgeport has a post office with ZIP code 05141.
