= Westminster Terrace Historic District =

Historic district in Vermont, United States

- U.S. National Register of Historic Places
- U.S. Historic district
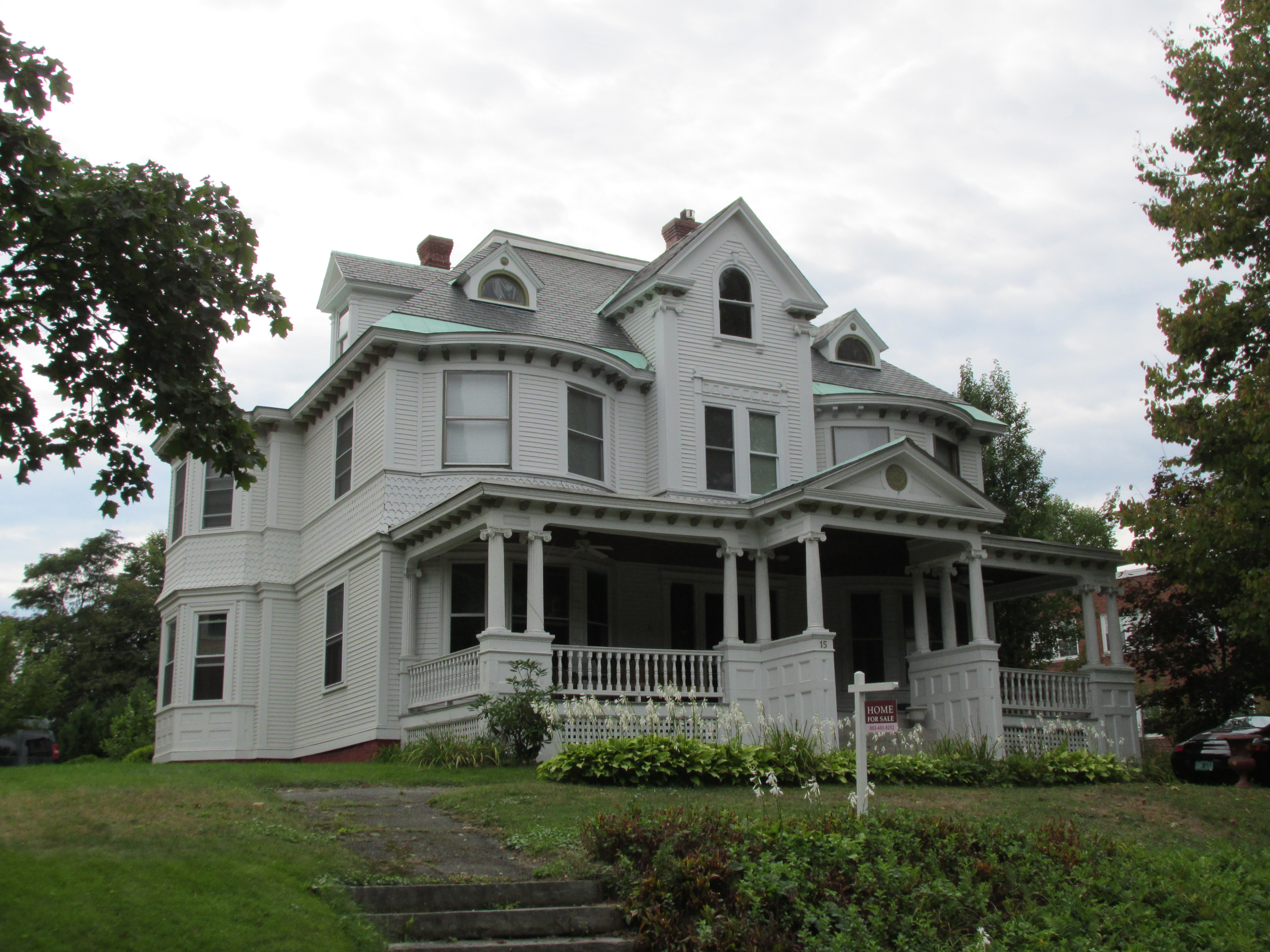
- House on Westminster Terrace

- Location within Vermont Location within the United States
- Location: Westminster Terrace, Rockingham and Westminster, Vermont
- Coordinates: 43°7′36″N 72°26′34″W
- Area: 12.5 acres (5.1 ha)
- Built: 1881
- NRHP reference No.: 09000265
- Added to NRHP: July 13, 2010

The Westminster Terrace Historic District encompasses a locally architecturally distinctive residential area on Westminster Terrace in Bellows Falls (a village of Rockingham) and Westminster, Vermont. First developed between about 1880 and 1910, the neighborhood has high-quality late 19th-century homes, interspersed with later mid-20th century development. It was listed on the National Register of Historic Places in 2010.

== Description and history ==
Westminster Terrace is geographically sited on a terrace overlooking the mouth of the Saxtons River, where it empties into the Connecticut River just below Bellows Falls, Vermont. The terrace is separated from the surrounding roads and properties (principally Westmminster Road, a major north-south artery) by steep terrain. The southernmost properties located on the terrace are across the town line in Westminster. The northern end of the district abuts the Bellows Falls Neighborhood Historic District. The terrace is occupied by 24 primary residential structures and a number of outbuildings. Most of these are large 2-1/2 story wood frame buildings in architectural styles popular in the late 19th and early 20th centuries, while there are also a number of mid-20th-century single-story ranch houses, which exemplify the shift in character of the area over time.

The terrace's initial use, by settlers in the early 18th century, was as farmland. In 1827 a pair of handsome Greek Revival mansions were built near its northern end, where the former Rockingham Memorial Hospital stands today. Beginning in 1880, the terrace's principal owner, a farmer named Edward Bancroft, began selling off the land for development. Early deed restrictions mandated minimum house values, sizes, and had ownership and occupancy restrictions excluding African Americans and the Irish. Development of the area as an upper-class enclave also prompted calls for a redrawing of municipal boundaries, in order to unite the area. In the first wave of building, a number of handsome Queen Anne style houses were erected, followed in the early 20th century by similarly sized buildings with Colonial Revival features. In the 1950s a number of the larger parcels were subdivided to permit the construction of the more modest ranch houses that stand in the neighborhood.

== See also ==
- National Register of Historic Places listings in Windham County, Vermont
