= Bartonsville Covered Bridge =

- U.S. National Register of Historic Places
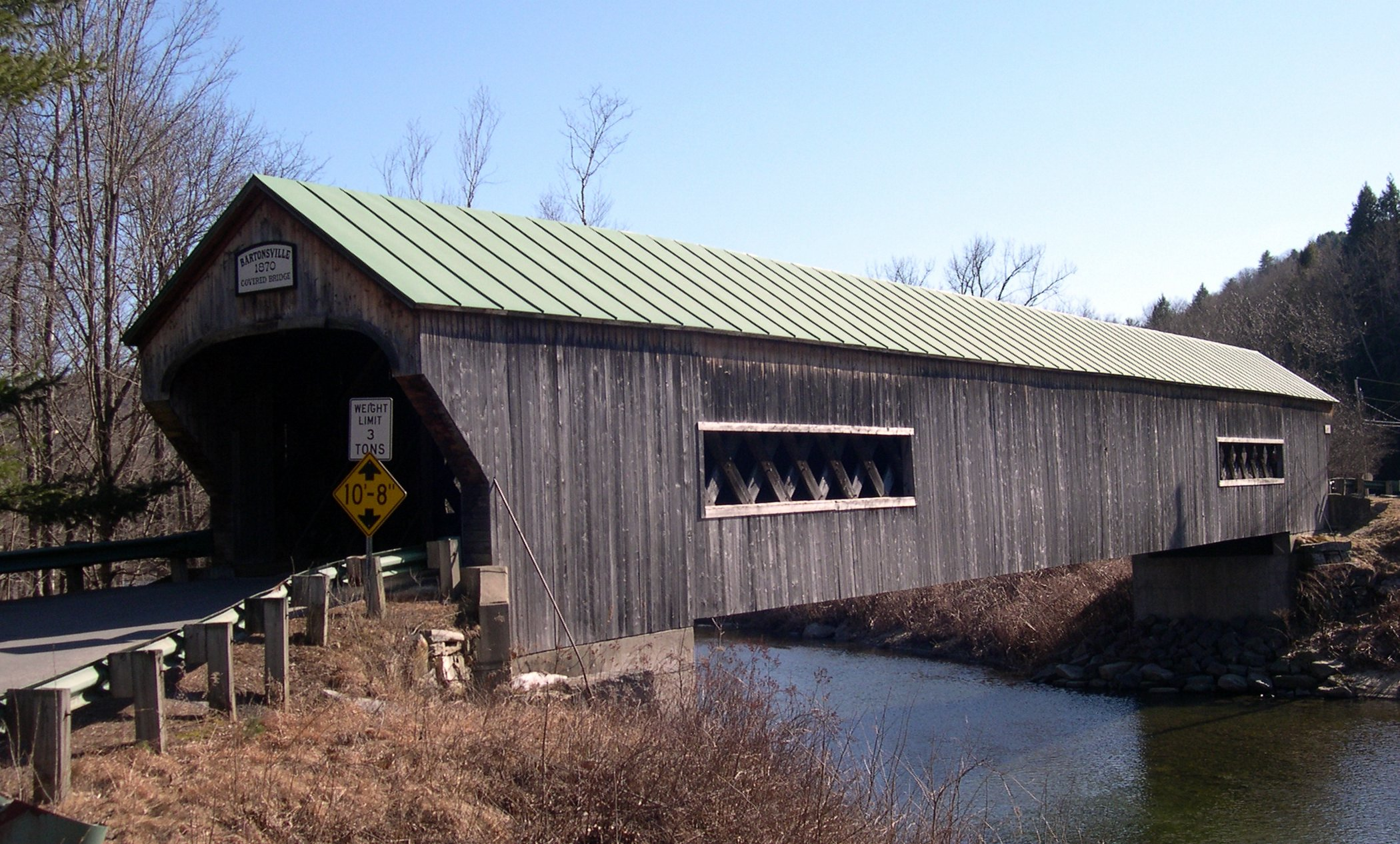
- The Northeast approach to the Bartonsville bridge, March 28, 2006 prior to its destruction

- Location within Vermont Location within the United States
- Location: Bartonsville, Vermont
- Coordinates: 43°13′27.23″N 72°32′12.45″W
- Area: 1 acre (0.40 ha)
- Built: 1871
- Architect: Granger, Sanford
- NRHP reference No.: 73000201
- Added to NRHP: July 2, 1973

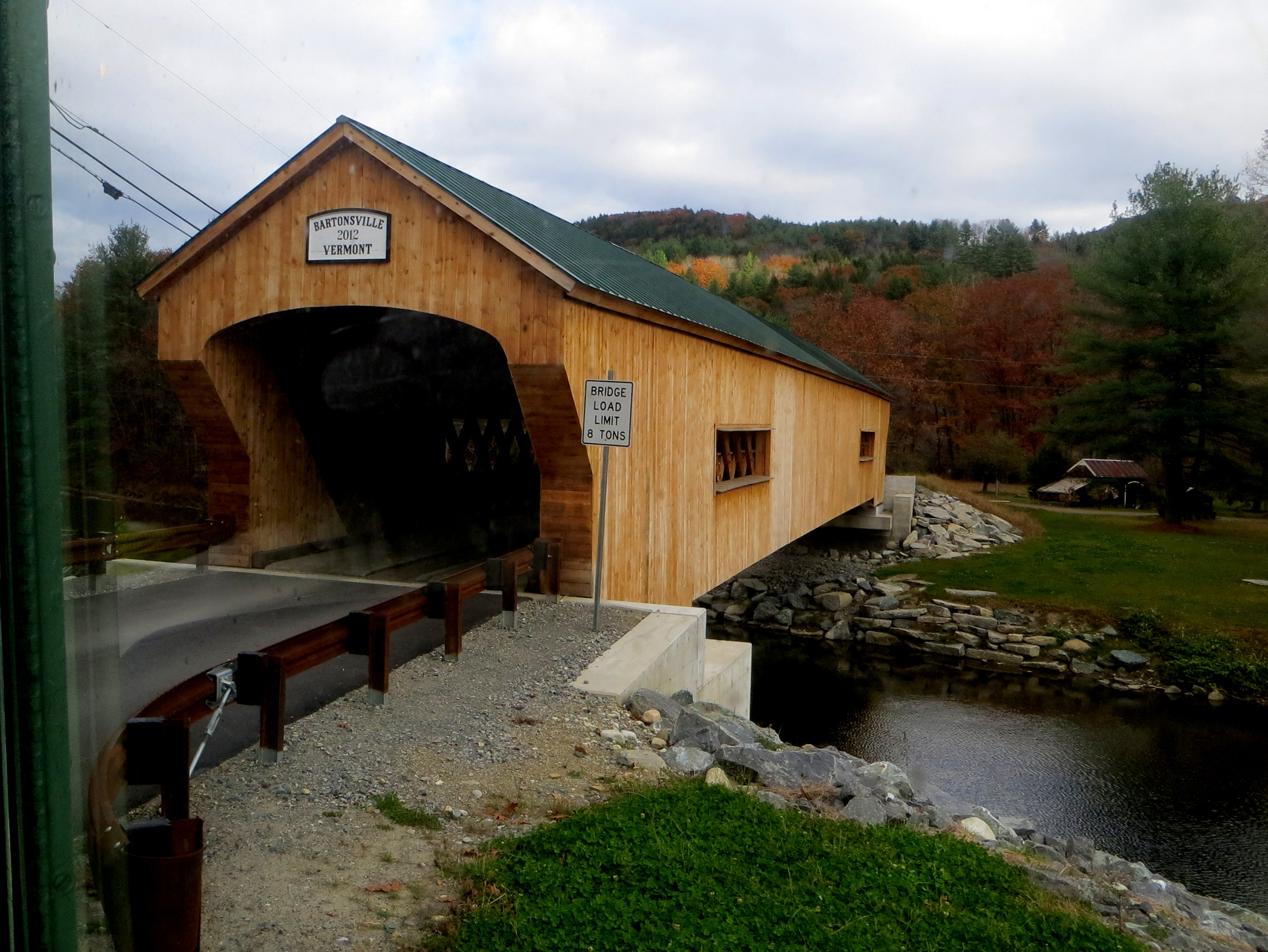
The new Bartonsville covered bridge, taken from the Green Mountain Flyer excursion train, on the south side of the Williams River.

The Bartonsville Covered Bridge is a wooden covered bridge in the village of Bartonsville, in Rockingham, Vermont, United States. The bridge is a lattice truss style with a 151-foot span, carrying Lower Bartonsville Road over the Williams River. It was built in 2012, replacing a similar bridge built in 1870 by Sanford Granger. The 1870 bridge, which was listed on the National Register of Historic Places, was destroyed in 2011 in flooding caused by Hurricane Irene.

== History ==
The bridge was built after the great flood of 1869 that changed the course of the river, replacing another covered bridge about 1/4 mile up the road where the river used to flow. The bridge is listed on the National Register of Historic Places.

It was located on Lower Bartonsville Road, a paved road a short distance north from Vermont Route 103. Nearby, to the east, is the Worrall Covered Bridge, also built by Granger.

In the 1960s, a Town of Rockingham gravel truck fell through the bridge cutting off cars from Lower Bartonsville Village from the direct link to Vermont Route 103 until the floor was replaced. In the early 1980s extensive renovations were conducted on the bridge, including replacing the abutment on the north side of the bridge, reinforcing the original stone abutments on the south side of the bridge, and replacing the roof and the weathered siding.

=== Destruction by Hurricane Irene and replacement ===
On August 28, 2011, the bridge was destroyed by flash flooding caused by excessive rainfall from Hurricane Irene's landfall on the U.S. East Coast. An effort to rebuild the structure was supported by town officials, who voted to use the bridge's insurance money to build another covered bridge.

The new bridge was opened on January 26, 2013.

== See also ==
- National Register of Historic Places listings in Windham County, Vermont
- List of bridges on the National Register of Historic Places in Vermont
- List of Vermont covered bridges
- Old Blenheim Bridge, a covered bridge in upstate New York, also destroyed by Tropical Storm Irene; rebuilt in 2017
