= Hall Covered Bridge =

- U.S. National Register of Historic Places
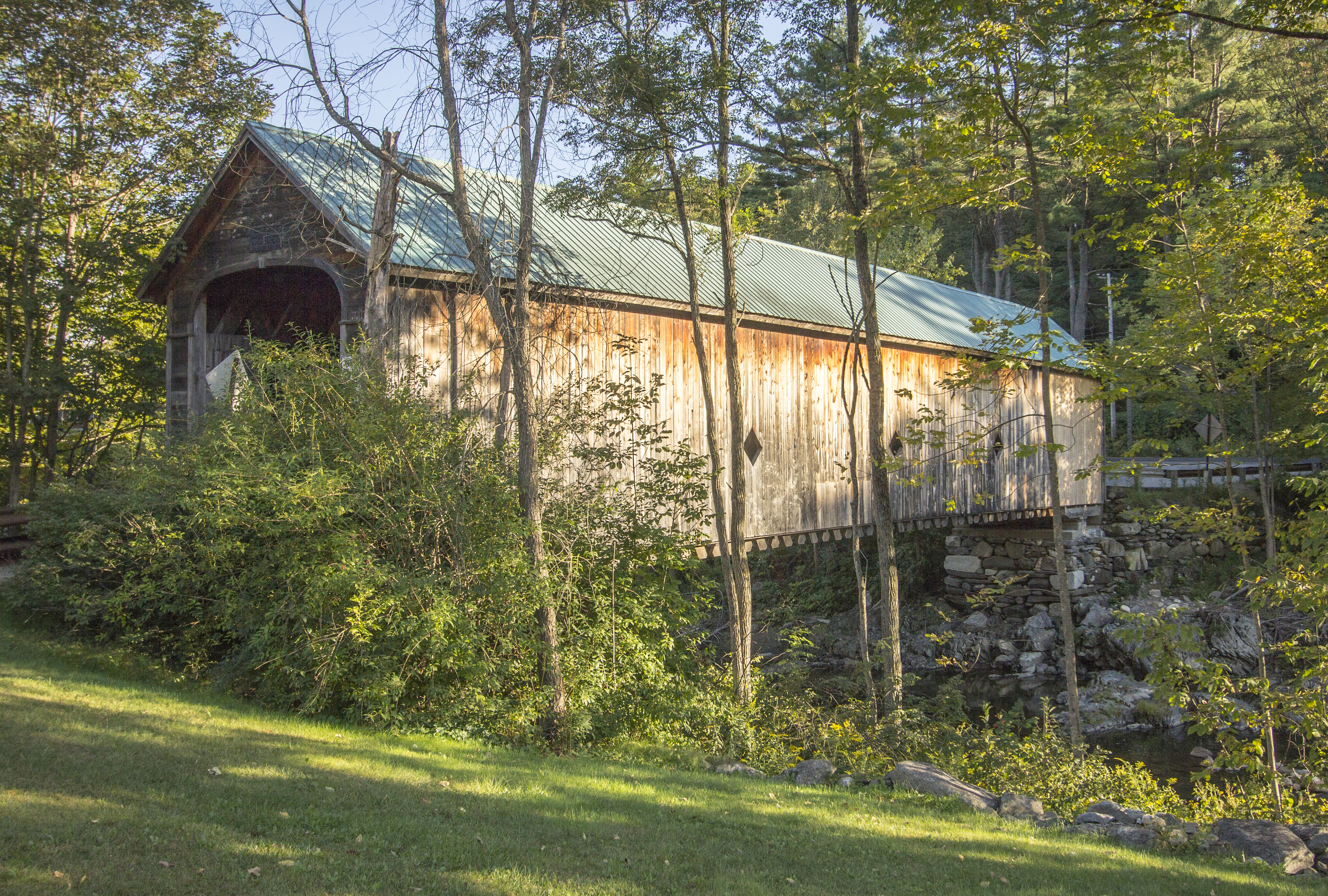

- Location within Vermont Location within the United States
- Location: Hall Bridge Road, Rockingham, Vermont
- Coordinates: 43°8′12″N 72°29′16″W
- Area: 1 acre (0.40 ha)
- Built: 1982
- Built by: Granger, Sanford
- Architectural style: Town lattice truss
- NRHP reference No.: 73000204
- Added to NRHP: August 28, 1973

The Hall Covered Bridge, located in southern Rockingham, Vermont, carries Hall Bridge Road across the Saxtons River, just north of its junction with Vermont Route 121. It is a Town lattice truss bridge, built in 1982 as a replica of a circa-1867 bridge that was destroyed by an overweight truck in 1980. The bridge was listed on the National Register of Historic Places in 1973.

== Description and history ==
The Hall Covered Bridge is located in a rural area of southern Rockingham, west of the village of Bellows Falls, spanning the Saxtons River about 1.2 miles (1.9 km) east of the village of Saxtons River. It is a single-span lattice truss bridge, based on the patent of architect Ithiel Town, and rests on stone abutments. Its sides are clad in vertical board siding, with three diamond-shaped window openings, and it is topped by a gabled metal roof.

The original bridge was built in 1867 by Sanford Granger, a local master bridge builder. It was, at the time of its listing on the National Register of Historic Places in 1973, one of three surviving 19th-century covered bridges in the town (out of 17 documented to exist). The bridge was destroyed by an overweight truck in 1980, and a replica was built in 1982 by Milton S. Graton, whose penchant for authenticity extended to the use of oxen to move the finished bridge into place.

== See also ==
- List of Vermont covered bridges
- List of bridges documented by the Historic American Engineering Record in Vermont
- List of bridges on the National Register of Historic Places in Vermont
- National Register of Historic Places listings in Windham County, Vermont
