= Adams Gristmill Warehouse =

- U.S. National Register of Historic Places
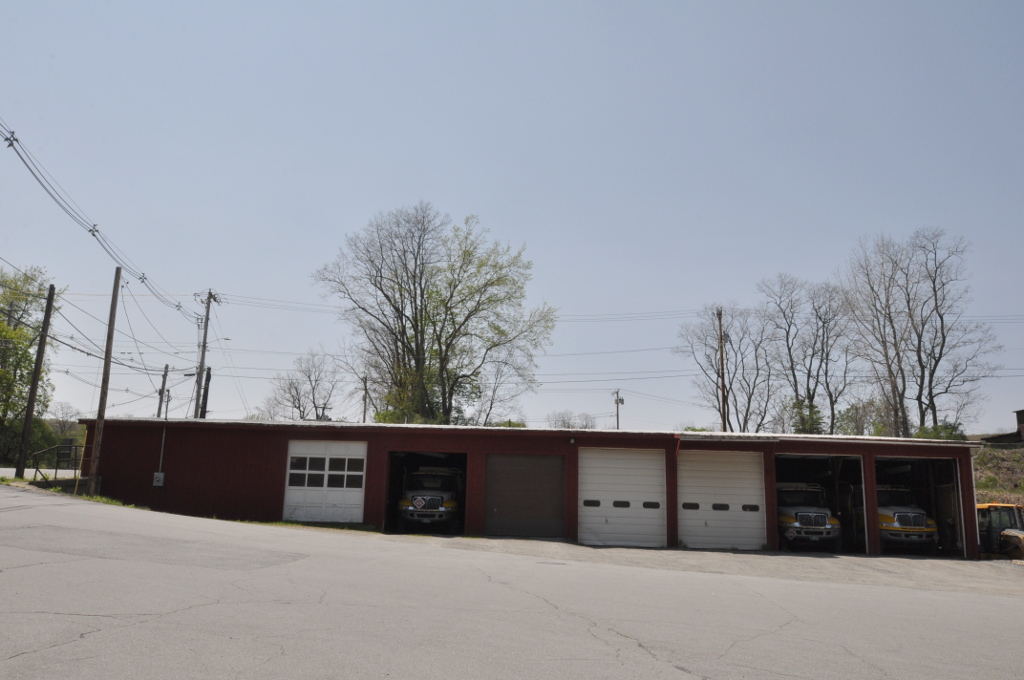

- Location within Vermont Location within the United States
- Location: Bridge St., Rockingham, Vermont
- Coordinates: 43°7′55″N 72°27′18″W
- Area: less than one acre
- Built: 1925
- MPS: Bellows Falls Island MRA
- NRHP reference No.: 88002162
- Added to NRHP: January 22, 1990

The Adams Gristmill Warehouse is a historic industrial building on Bridge Street in Bellows Falls, Vermont. Built about 1925 by Frank Adams & Co., proprietors of the Adams Gristmill, it is a well-preserved example of a functional railroad-related industrial warehouse. It was listed on the National Register of Historic Places in 1990.

== Description and history ==
The Adams Gristmill Warehouse is set on the north side of Bridge Street in the eastern part of the island formed by the Connecticut River and the Bellows Falls Canal. It is a single-story shed-roofed structure, rectangular in shape, with its long axis oriented perpendicular to the road. It is set on sloping land, and only its eastern and southern facades are fully exposed, with clapboard and shiplap siding. The short northern and western walls are concrete block. The eastern facade is its principal one, with six bays that include a number of large freight entrances.

The warehouse was built about 1925 for Frank Adams & Co., who operated the Adams Gristmill (now home to the Bellows Falls Historical Society Museum) in central Bellows Falls. The building was served by a railroad spur (now inactive and paved over) and was used by the Adams mill to store flour and grain. The mill ceased operation in the 1960s, and the warehouse has since been adaptively repurposed by other industrial uses.

== See also ==
- National Register of Historic Places listings in Windham County, Vermont
