= Williams River (Vermont) =

River in Vermont

Coordinates: 43.3363953°N 72.6745717°W

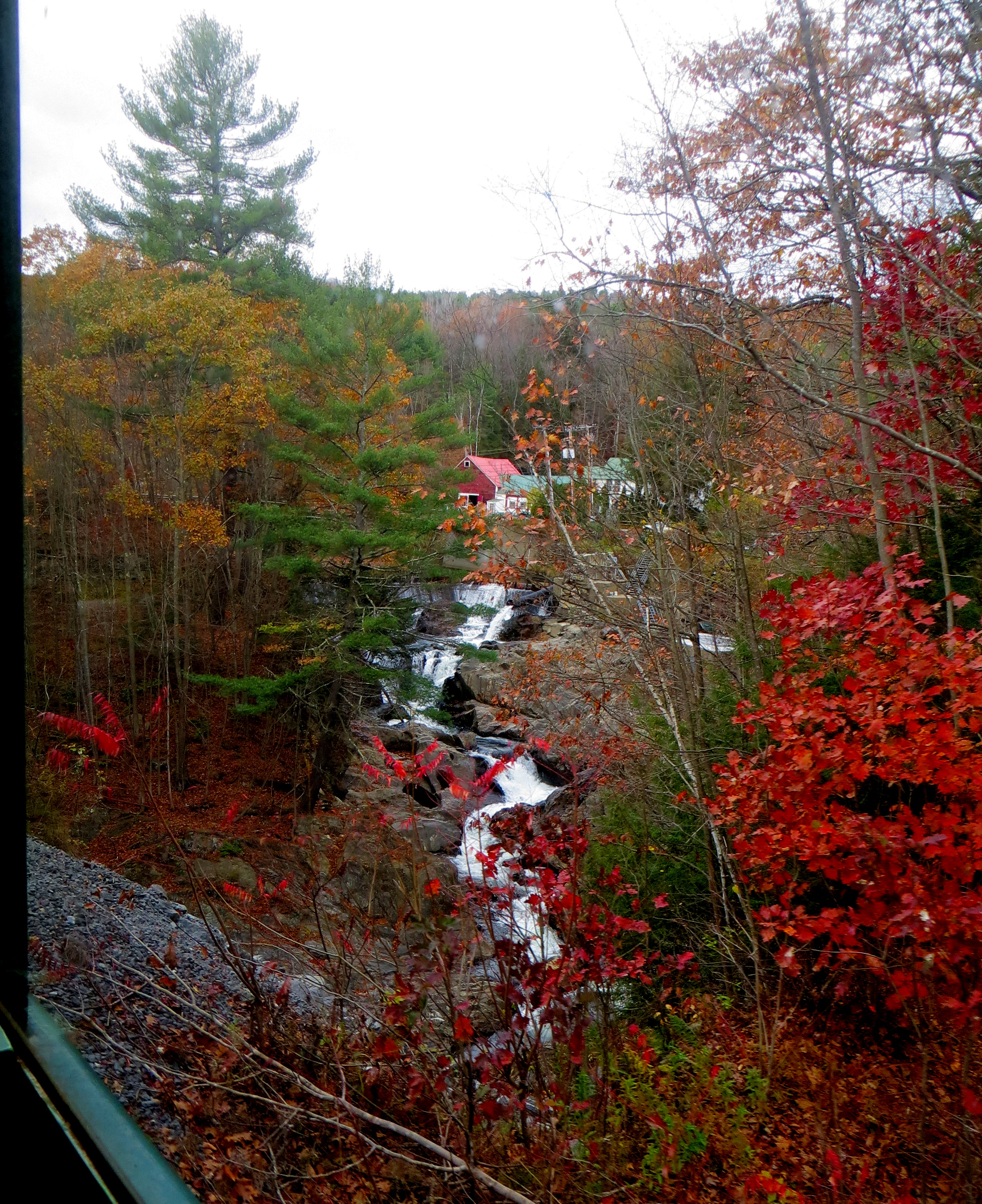
Sokoki Falls as seen from the Green Mountain Flyer excursion train. On the Williams River in Rockingham, VT.

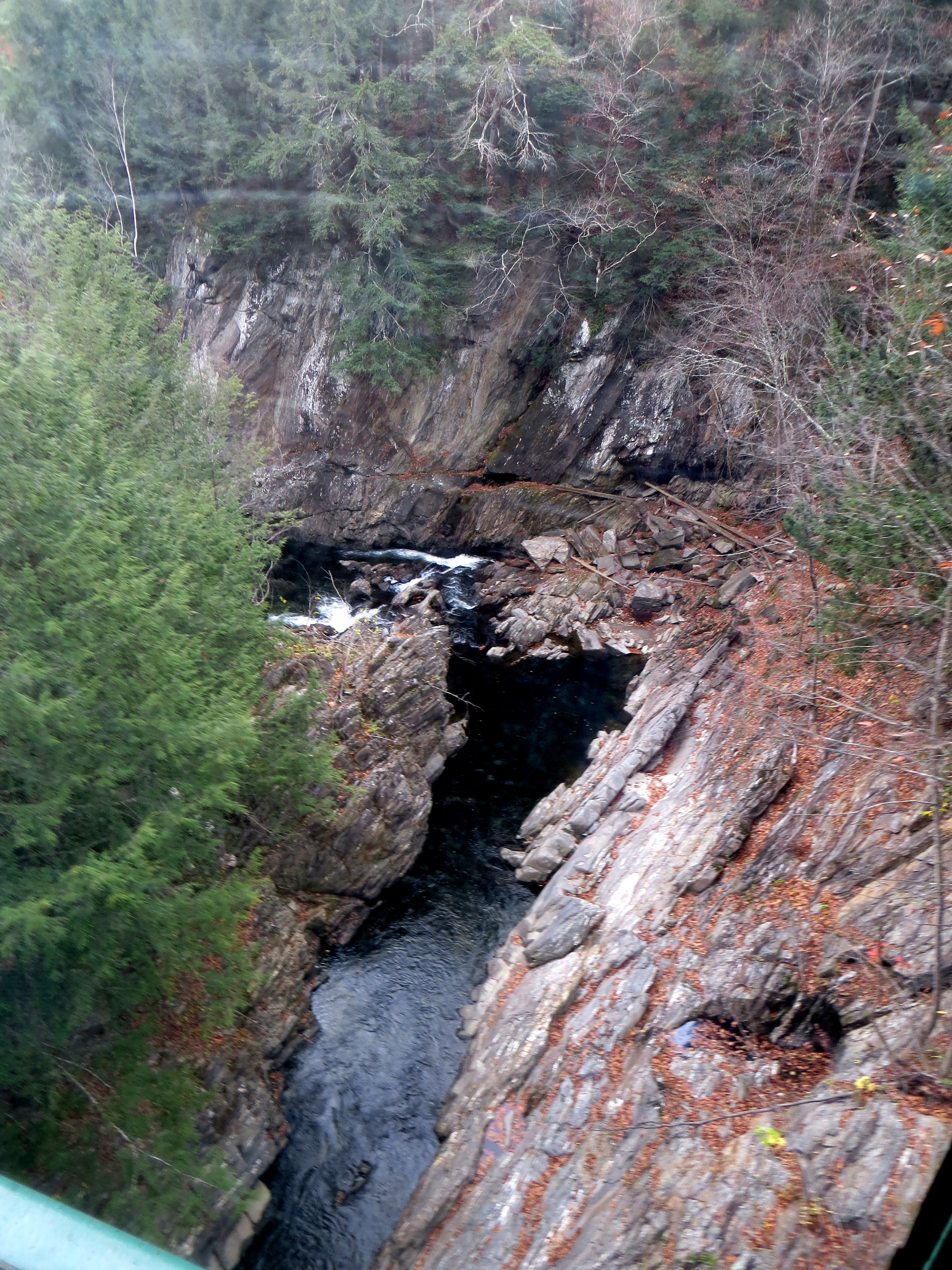
Brockways Mills Gorge, just below Sokoki Falls, as seen from the Green Mountain Flyer excursion train. On the Williams River in Rockingham, VT.

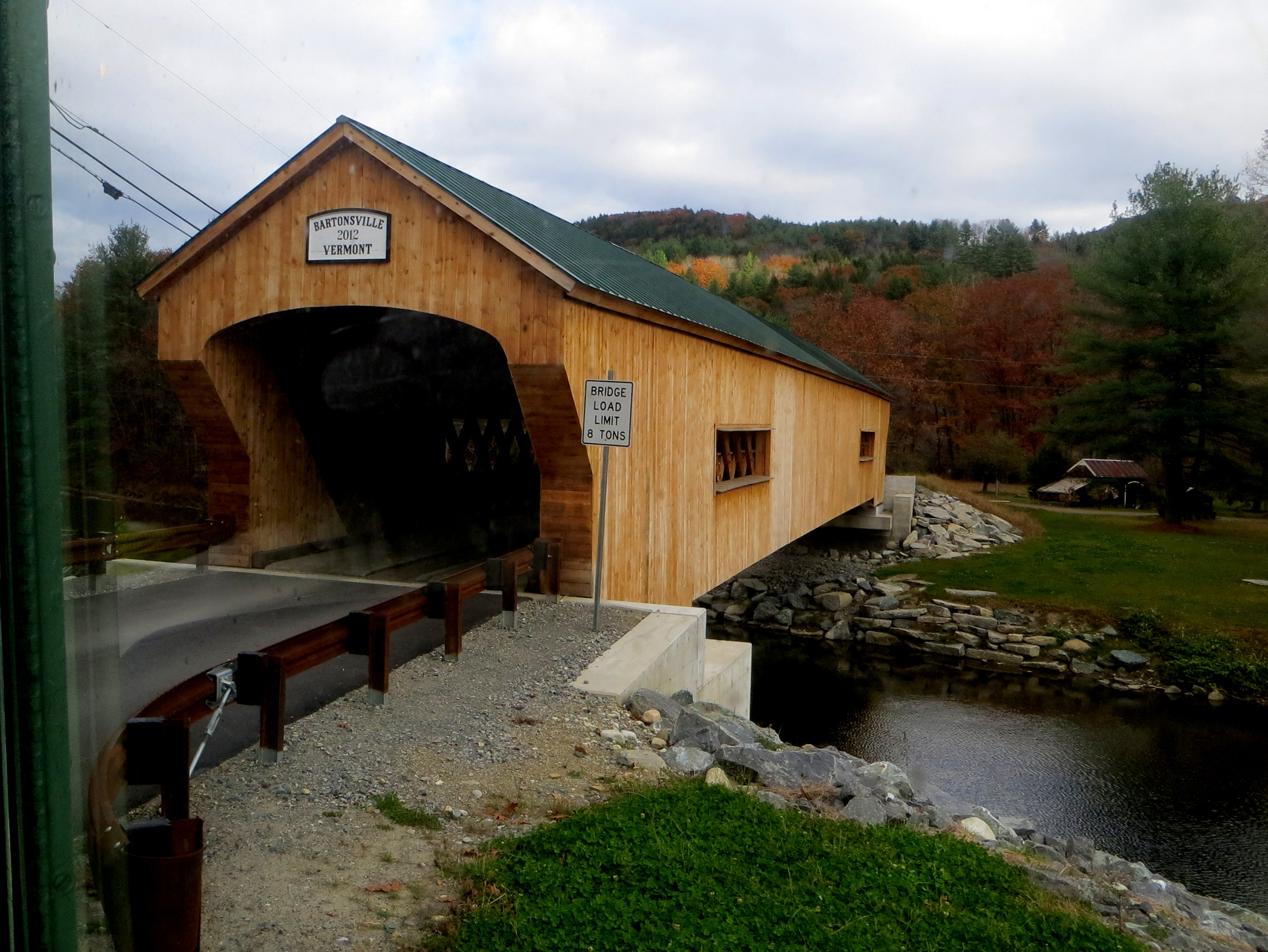
The new Bartonsville covered bridge, taken from the Green Mountain Flyer excursion train, on the south side of the Williams River.

The Williams River is a 27.0-mile (43.5 km) river in the US state of Vermont. It is a tributary of the Connecticut River. Its watershed covers 117 square miles; land use is about 80% forested and 4% agricultural, and the upper river supports wild brook trout and brown trout.

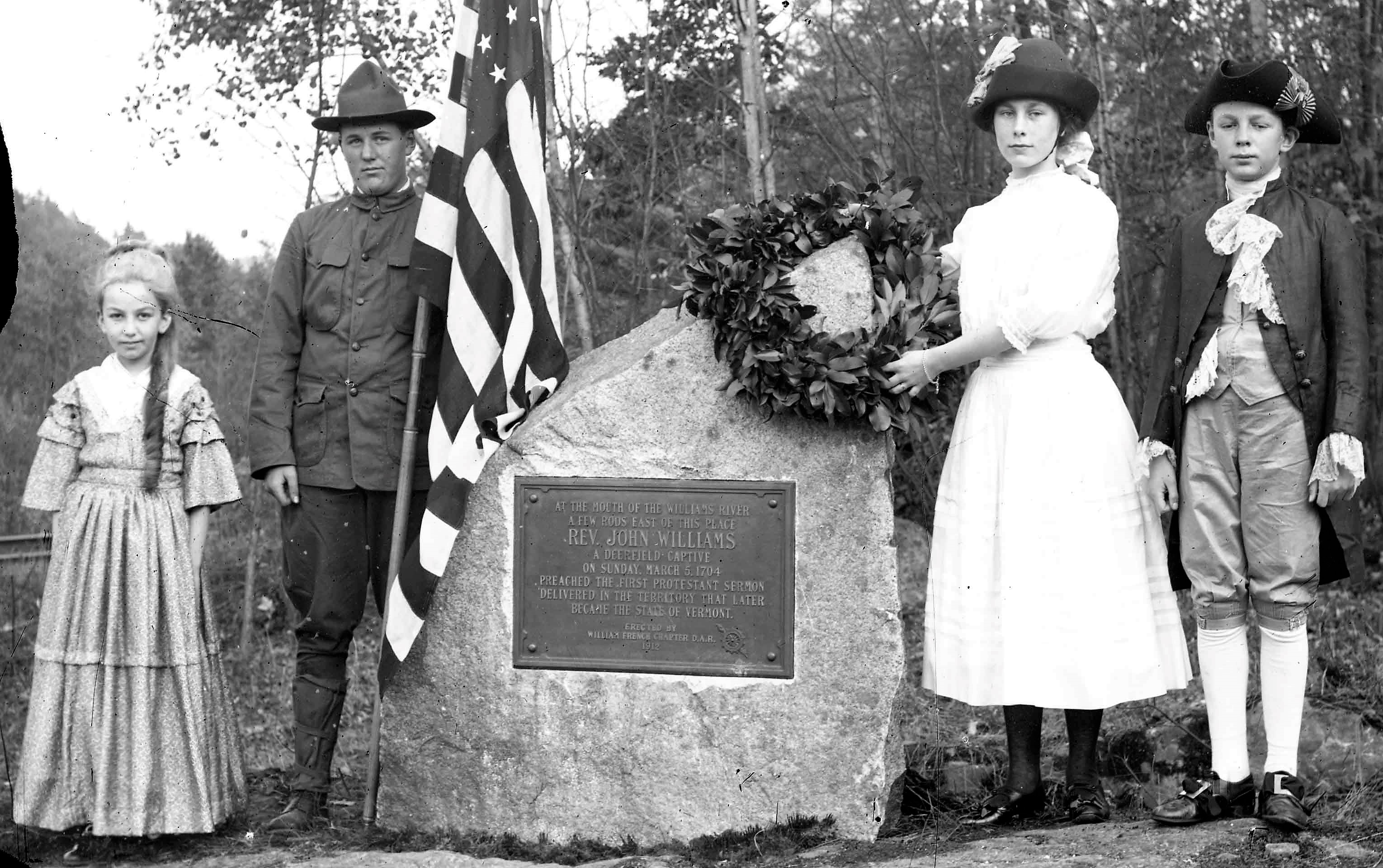
John Williams memorial dedication in 1912 in Rockingham, VT, near the mouth of the Williams River, just north of the intersection of Rts. 5 & 103

The river was named for John Williams of Deerfield, Massachusetts. He preached the first Christian sermon in what would become Vermont near the mouth of the river on March 5, 1704. His text was from Lamentations 1:18: "Hear now, all peoples, And behold my sorrow; My virgins and my young men Have gone into captivity." A historical marker was placed near the site of the sermon in 1912 (see photo). At the time, he and part of his congregation were captives of the French, the Mohawk and the Abenaki after the Deerfield Raid, being marched from Deerfield, MA to Quebec, Canada.

The Williams River rises in the northern part of the town of Andover and flows east through a corner of Ludlow and into Chester, where it turns southeast. The river then flows in a narrow valley near Vermont Route 103 between rolling hills into the town of Rockingham, where it joins the Connecticut River at Herricks Cove. Its major tributaries (from upriver to downriver) include Wheaton Brook, Lovejoy Brook, and Bear Brook in Andover and Ludlow. In Chester, it is joined by the Middle Branch Williams River, which starts in Windham; the tributaries of the Middle Branch include Lyman Brook, Andover Branch, and South Branch Williams River. Named tributaries in Rockingham include Wright Brook, Stearns Brook, Wiley Hill Brook, and Divoll Brook (flowing north), and Skunk Hollow Brook, Petty Brook, Brockways Mills Brook, Lillie Brook, Locke Brook, and O'Brien Brook (flowing south). The lower part of Petty Brook (in Bartonsville) was the mainstem of the river until a flood in 1869 changed its course. The Williams River watershed lies south of the Black River watershed, which includes most of Springfield, and north of the Saxtons River watershed.

In Rockingham it is crossed by the Bartonsville Covered Bridge that was washed away in Hurricane Irene in August 2011, rebuilt in 2012, and reopened in January 2013, as well as the Worrall Covered Bridge, the only 19th century covered bridge left in town. Below those bridges, it flows over Sokoki Falls, named for the local band of the Abenaki, and through Brockways Mills Gorge.

The river is a target for prospectors who can be seen panning for placer gold, south of the Town of Ludlow, near the site of the Rio Tinto open-pit talc mine.

== See also ==
- List of rivers of Vermont
