= Bellows Falls Canal =

Canal in Bellows Falls, Vermont, U.S.

Coordinates: 43°8′5″N 72°26′39″W

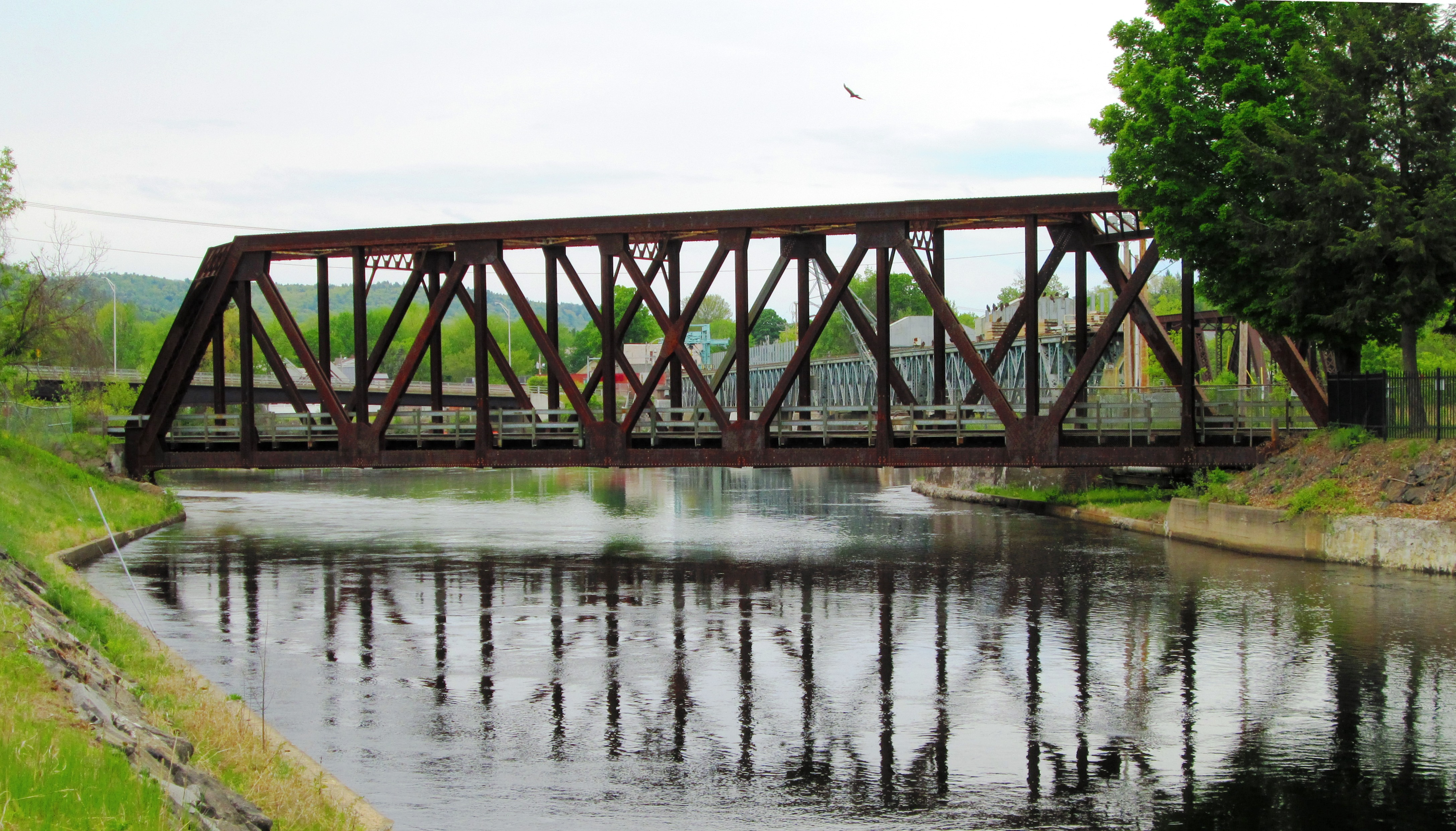
A railroad truss bridge over Bellows Falls Canal

Bellows Falls Canal is a canal constructed to allow boat traffic to bypass Great Falls on the Connecticut River in Bellows Falls, Vermont. It was constructed by the Bellows Falls Canal Company and was one of the first canals in the United States. It was used for transport, to power mills, and later for hydroelectric power. The Bellows Falls Downtown Historic District includes the canal.

The Library of Congress has a dry plate negative of the canal from 1907. A historical marker on Bridge Street in Bellows Falls, Vermont commemorates the canal's history.

== History ==
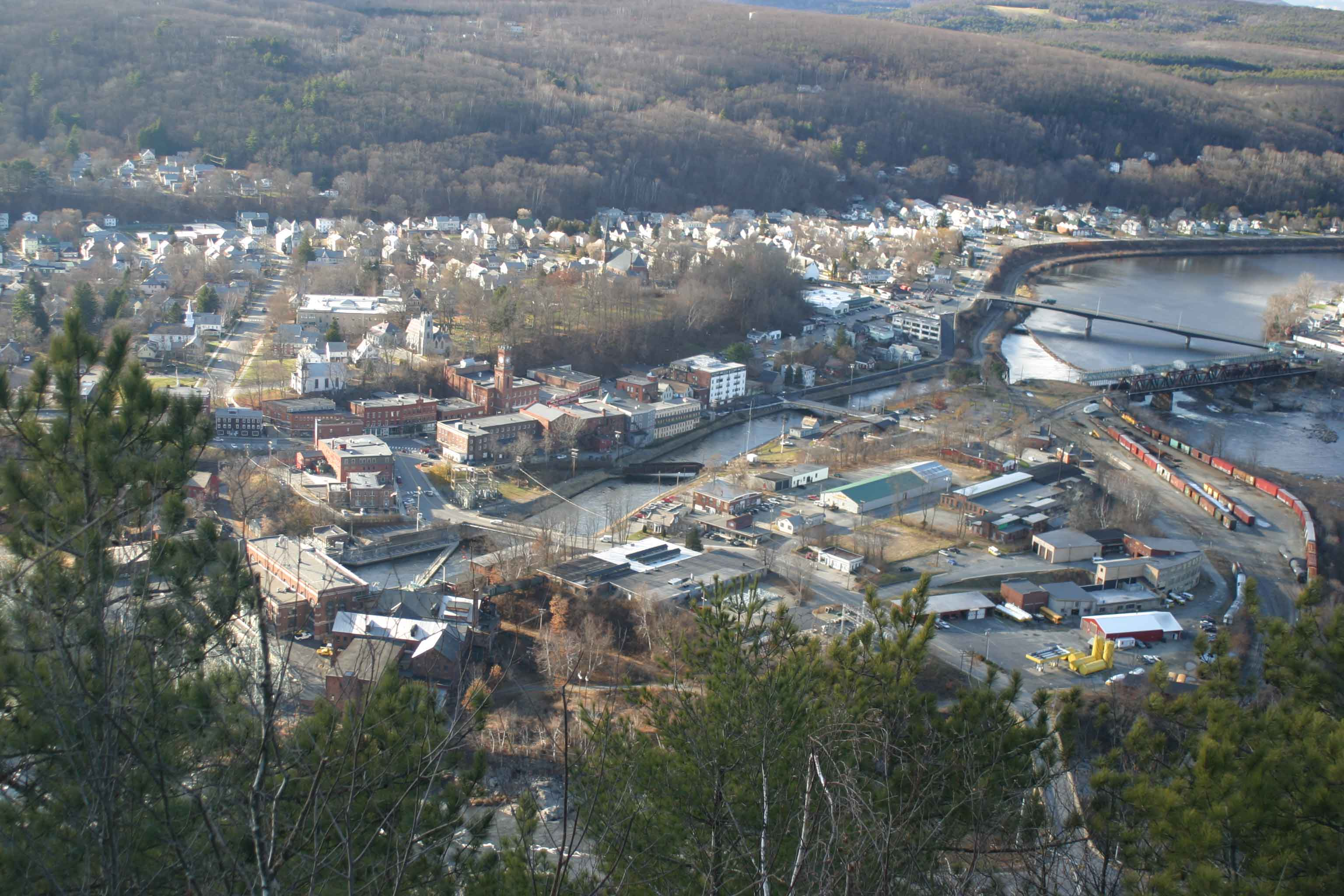
View of Bellows Falls, Vermont, including Bellows Falls Canal as it cuts away from the Connecticut River

A British-owned company was chartered to make the Connecticut River navigable in 1791 and spent 10 years building nine locks and a dam to bypass 52-foot-high (16 m) Great Falls. The canal was completed in 1802. Although it was planned and built for river transportation, by the time it opened in 1802 there was already at least one mill using the canal for water power, with more built soon after.

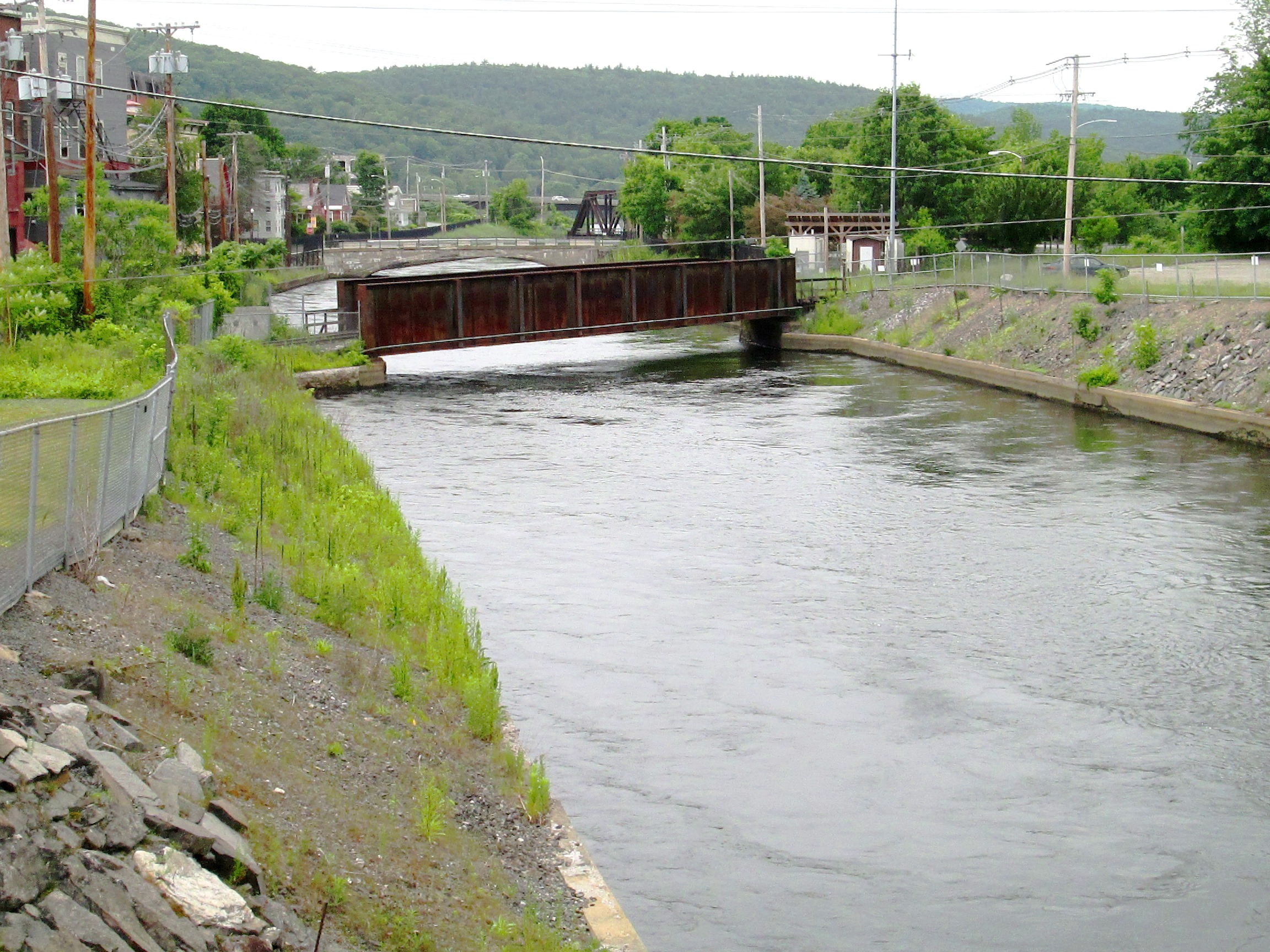
View of Bellows Falls Canal from Bridge Street

Usage declined with the arrival of railroad service in the area in 1849, and the canal ceased to carry boat traffic in 1858. After 1858, the canal only supplied water power to the neighboring mills, of which there were six at the time. After the mills were converted to electric power, the lower (southern) end of the canal with the locks was filled in, and the upper part of the canal was enlarged in 1926-28 to bring more water to a new hydroelectric generating plant built on Bridge Street, which became the southern end of the canal. The hydroelectric plant has a fish ladder, primarily to aid the passage of American shad, with a visitors center and viewing window that is usually open in the summer.

The lower end of the canal with the locks, south of Bridge Street along what is now Mill Street, is where many of the mills were built to use its power. The 1886 lithograph by Burleigh in the sidebar shows some of those mills.

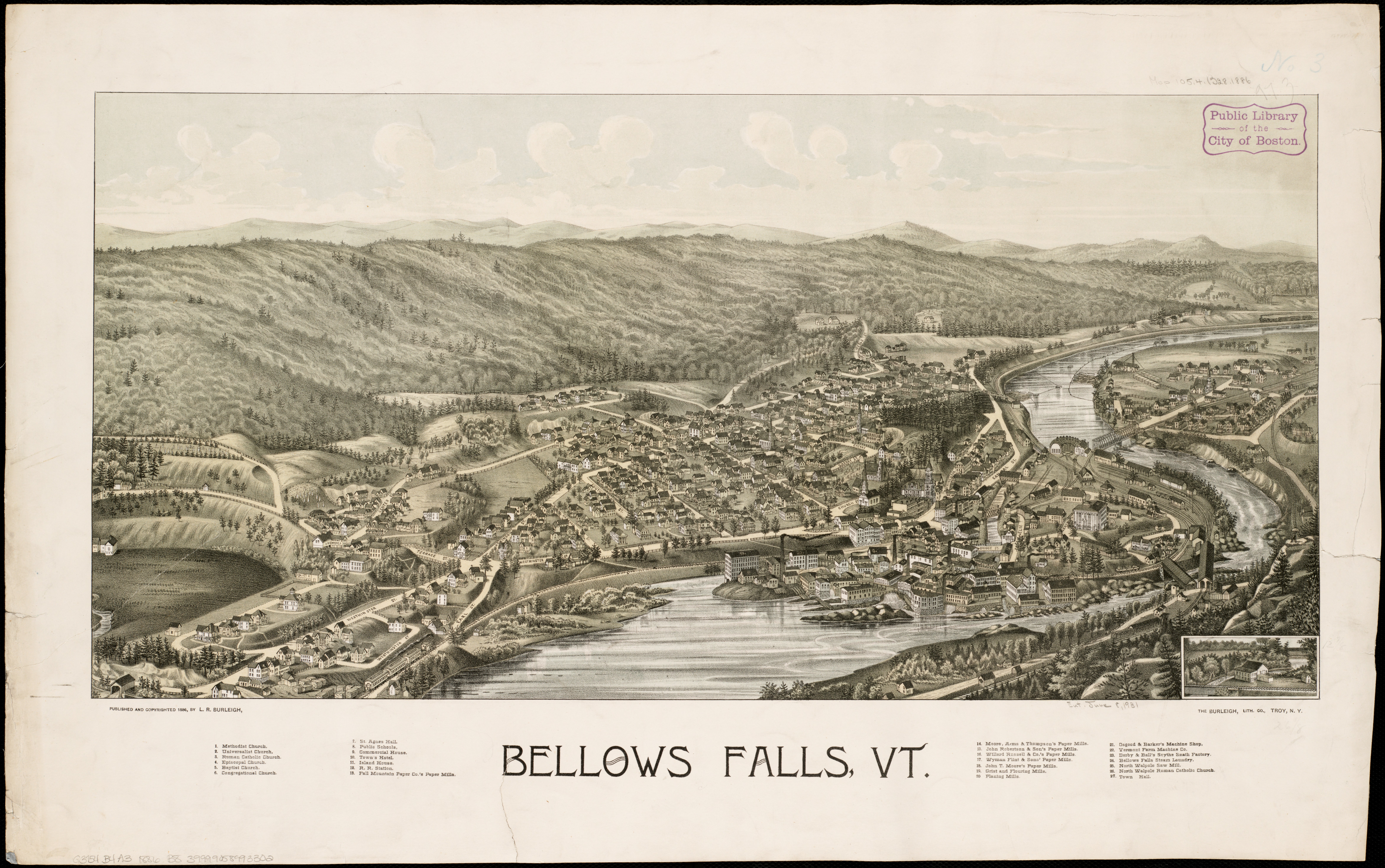
1886 birds-eye map of Bellows Falls, Vermont and a listing of its major buildings by L. R. Burleigh

Only one of those mills is still standing, the Frank Adams Grist Mill (see photo in sidebar), the closest mill shown to the left of the large smokestack in the lower center part of the 1886 image, labeled "13". (Several other mills have the same label.)

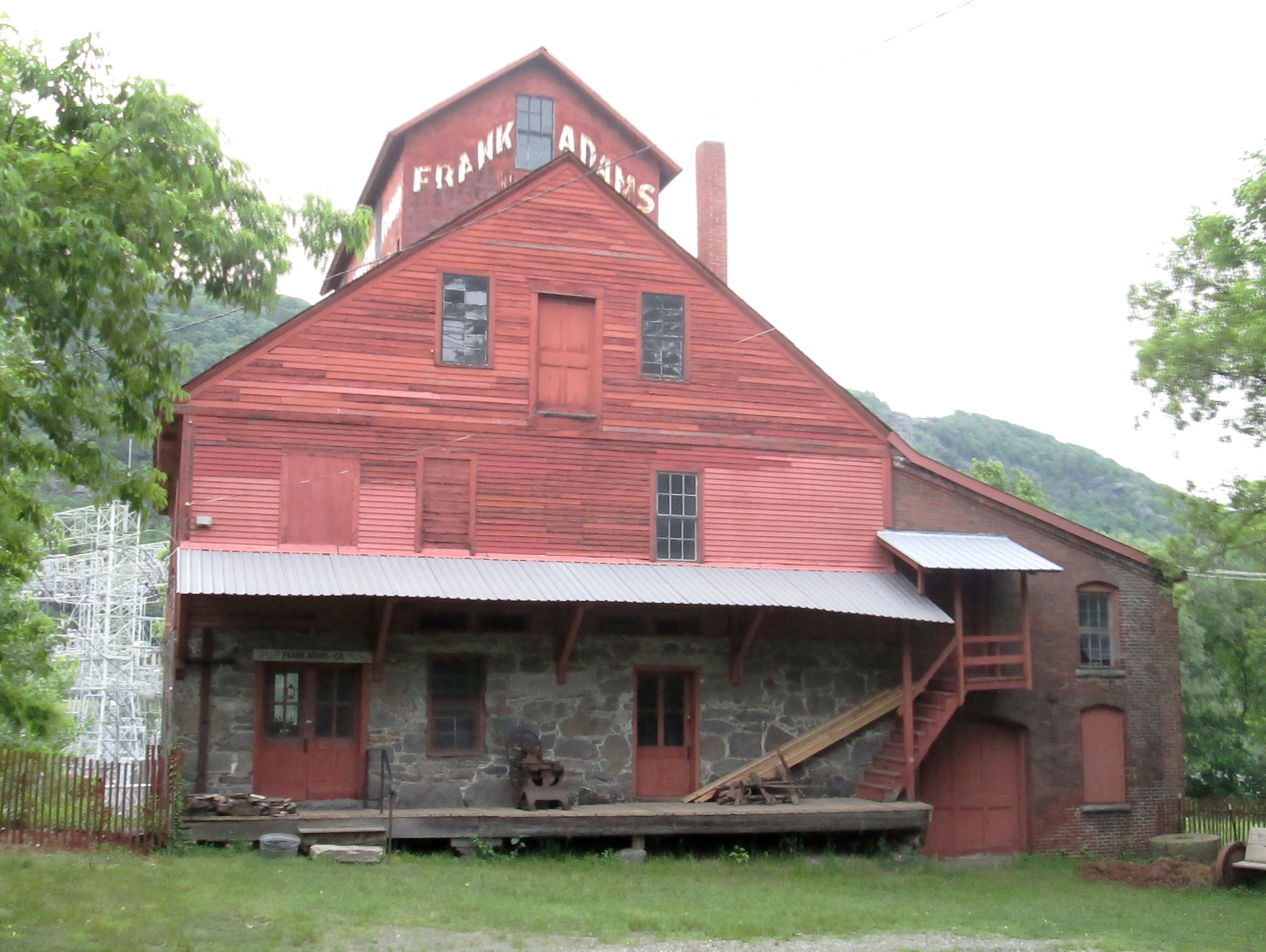
Frank Adams Grist Mill, Bellows Falls, Vermont

The canal ran behind where the photographer who took the picture of the grist mill was standing, on what is now Mill Street. The area where those mills stood along the lower end of the canal is now a public park, the Bellows Falls Historic Riverfront Park and Trail System, located along Mill Street.
