= Londonderry Town House =

- U.S. National Register of Historic Places
- U.S. Historic district – Contributing property
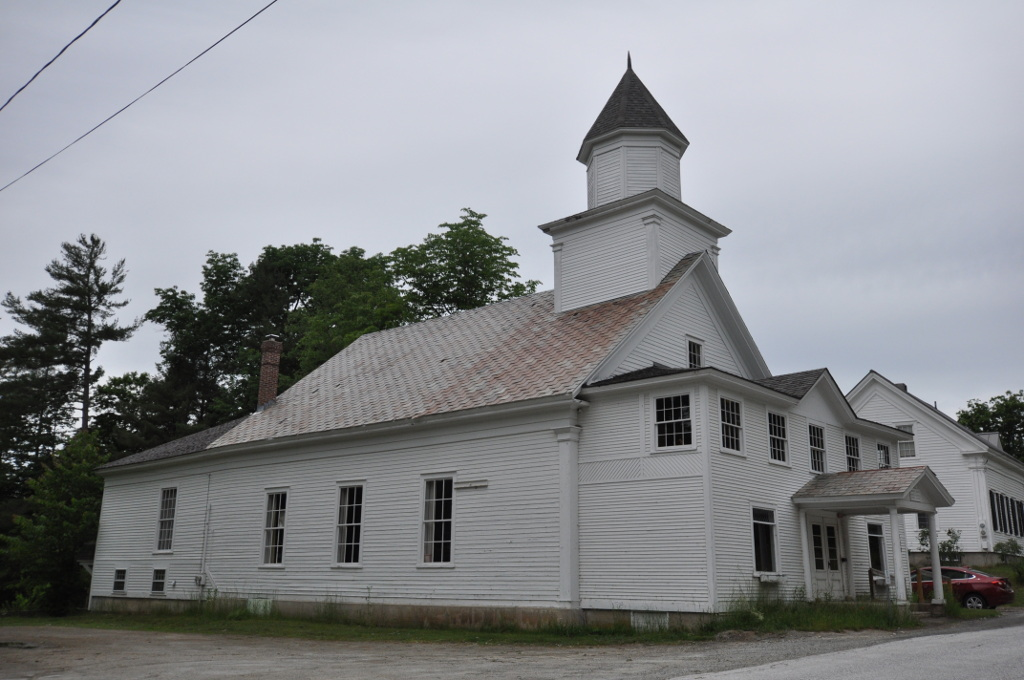

- Location within Vermont Location within the United States
- Location: Middletown St., South Londonderry, Vermont
- Coordinates: 43°11′41″N 72°48′54″W
- Area: 0.3 acres (0.12 ha)
- Built: 1860
- Part of: South Londonderry Village Historic District (ID86001943)
- NRHP reference No.: 83003227

Significant dates
- Added to NRHP: July 14, 1983
- Designated CP: July 24, 1986

The Londonderry Town House, or the Londonderry Town Hall is the town hall of Londonderry, Vermont. It is located on Middletown Road in the village of South Londonderry. Built in 1860, its architecture encapsulates the changing functions of this type of public venue through more than 100 years of history. It was listed on the National Register of Historic Places in 1983.

== Description and history ==
The town of Londonderry is located in northwestern Windham County, on the eastern flanks of the Green Mountains. The civic center of the town is in the village of South Londonderry, where Vermont Route 100 crosses the West River. Although the town offices are now located off Main Street, south of the river crossing, its old town hall (still used for town meetings and civic events) stands on Middletown Street, north of its junction with Route 100. It is a two-story wood frame structure, whose appearance has been altered by a number of additions. The core of the building is rectangular, with a front-facing gable roof and a two-stage bell tower flush with that section's front. In front of this is a rectangular hip-roof vestibule, with a five-bay two-story facade, and a projecting gable-roofed porch sheltering the main entrance. An ell extends the building to the rear, with more additions projecting from it.

The core building was erected in 1860, and was a fairly typical New England town hall of the period, with a large chamber with a second-floor gallery, that served as a meeting point for the town's civic and social functions. By the late 19th century, the hall was also used as a performing venue for traveling and local theatrical productions, and was extended to the rear. In the early 20th century the front vestibule was added, providing space for a ticket office and other amenities. The interior of the hall primarily dates to this period, and notably includes the canvas stage curtain, which depicts a scene of the Rhine River. The hall was used for a time to house town offices, and continues to be used for annual town meetings.

== See also ==
- National Register of Historic Places listings in Windham County, Vermont
