= Jamaica, Vermont =

- Town
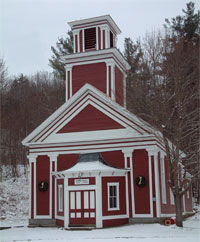
- Town Hall

- Logo

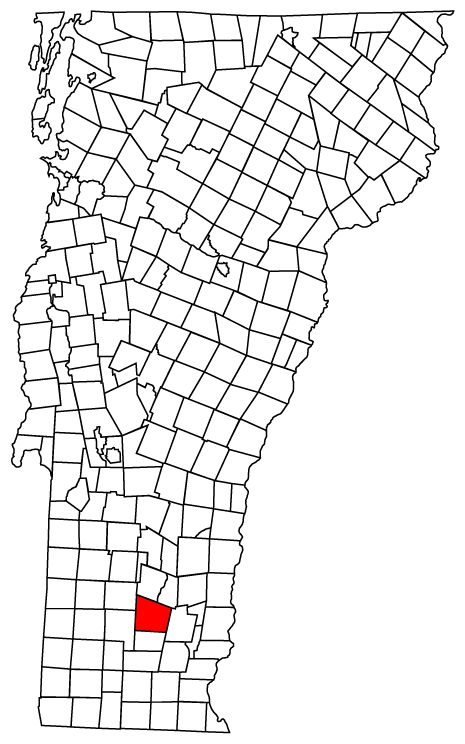
- Jamaica, Vermont
- Coordinates: 43°06′41″N 72°47′30″W
- Country: United States
- State: Vermont
- County: Windham
- Chartered: 1780
- Settled: 1780
- Organized: 1781
- Communities: Jamaica; East Jamaica; Pikes Falls; Rawsonville; West Jamaica

Area
  - Total: 49.5 sq mi (128.1 km^{2})
  - Land: 49.3 sq mi (127.8 km^{2})
  - Water: 0.12 sq mi (0.3 km^{2})
- Elevation: 1,312 ft (400 m)

Population (2020)
  - Total: 1,005
  - Density: 20/sq mi (7.9/km^{2})
- Time zone: UTC-5 (Eastern (EST))
  - Summer (DST): UTC-4 (EDT)
- ZIP Codes: 05343 (Jamaica); 05155 (South Londonderry); 05359 (West Townshend)
- Area code: 802
- FIPS code: 50-36175
- GNIS feature ID: 1462126
- Website: www.jamaicavermont.org

Jamaica is a town in Windham County, Vermont, United States. The population was 1,005 at the 2020 census. The town includes the villages of Jamaica, East Jamaica and Rawsonville.

Its ZIP code is 05343. The town is home to Jamaica State Park, noted for scenic camping spots and various swimming holes, including Hamilton Falls. The nearest large town is Brattleboro.

== History ==
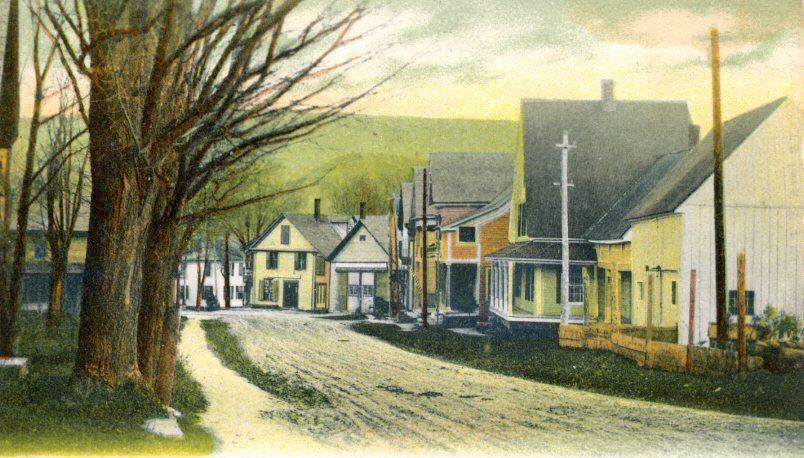
Jamaica Village in c. 1907

In the colonial period, what is now Vermont was disputed territory, with land claims from both New York and New Hampshire. The original grants for this area, issued by the Royal Governor of New York in 1767 and 1772, were for two towns. But in 1777, the Republic of Vermont was established. Ignoring the previous grants, it gave charter on November 7, 1780, for “a tract of vacant land within this state which has not heretofore been granted.”

The charter goes on to say “that the same be and is hereby Incorporated into a Township by the name of Jamaica”—its name from the Natick word for beaver and not the Caribbean island. The grant encompassed forty-two square miles, at an altitude ranging from 688 feet (210 m) above sea level along the West River to 2,542 feet (775 m) on The Pinnacle. On the charter were listed sixty-seven grantees, many of whose surnames can be found among residents today.

Earliest settlement of the town was along the West River near the Wardsboro Bridge, now called East Jamaica, where the first school was established in 1791; however, the building of new roads and bridges towards Manchester advanced settlement westward, so that by 1800 the town center was shifting to Jamaica Village. Within the entire forty-two square-mile township developed as many as ten separate hamlets, each surrounded by outlying farms and linked to Jamaica Village by a network of roads. Eventually there were as many as fourteen one-room schools which served the families in the outlying areas.

In the first quarter of the nineteenth century, Jamaica Village also assumed increasing importance as a manufacturing center, largely for topographical reasons. Located near the confluence of the West River and Ball Mountain Brook, the area offered a strategic location for bridges, dams and mills. Along Ball Mountain Brook alone there were numerous dams, each providing power for at least one mill. The first store, Noon House, was built in 1803. The popularity of Noon House led to the building in 1814 of Jamaica House, which provided a convenient overnight spot for travelers at the midpoint between Manchester and Brattleboro.

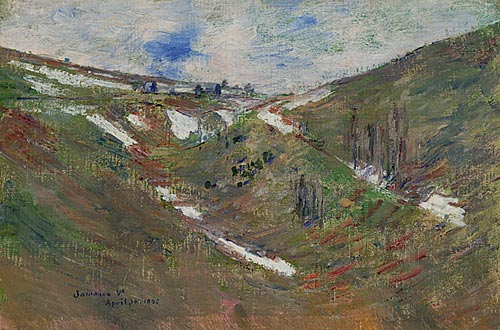
Jamaica, Vermont (1895) by Theodore Robinson

Like many Vermont communities, the town's economy prospered with the introduction of Merino sheep in the early nineteenth century. The sheep flourished on rocky hillsides, and as their numbers increased, bare land replaced forests, but this prosperity did not last. The depression that followed the Civil War, and the decline in the wool market, took their toll on the economy.

Many sons of Jamaica served with the Union Army during the Civil War. Windham County contributed heavily to manning the 4th Vermont Infantry and nearly all of Jamaica's men joined Company I of that regiment. This regiment saw heavy combat throughout the war but the Battle of the Wilderness took the greatest toll on those from the village of Jamaica. One of Jamaica's soldiers, Sergeant Henry W. Downs of Company I, 8th Vermont Infantry, won the Medal of Honor for bravery under fire.

In 1869, a great flood carried away “a mile of bridges” and damaged every dam on Ball Mountain Brook. Because of its setting near the river and the region's heavy snows, Jamaica has suffered through many damaging floods in the more than two hundred years since its founding.

During this period, Jamaica and other towns in the West River Valley bonded together in a venture that was seen as the salvation of the area’s economic woes, the West River Railroad. Originally chartered in 1867, the proposed railroad was to run from Brattleboro to Whitehall, New York. In 1877, financing provided by the valley towns moved the languishing project forward with the first segment from Brattleboro to Londonderry. Although it was never extended farther, the railroad provided valuable public transportation for the lower West River Valley until the 1930s, by which time automobile ownership had become almost universal.

== Demographics ==
Historical population
Census	Pop.	Note	%±
1790	263		—
1800	582		121.3%
1810	996		71.1%
1820	1,313		31.8%
1830	1,553		18.3%
1840	1,586		2.1%
1850	1,606		1.3%
1860	1,541		−4.0%
1870	1,223		−20.6%
1880	1,252		2.4%
1890	1,074		−14.2%
1900	800		−25.5%
1910	716		−10.5%
1920	566		−20.9%
1930	570		0.7%
1940	567		−0.5%
1950	597		5.3%
1960	496		−16.9%
1970	590		19.0%
1980	681		15.4%
1990	754		10.7%
2000	946		25.5%
2010	1,035		9.4%
2020	1,005		−2.9%
U.S. Decennial Census

As of the census of 2000, there were 946 people, 416 households, and 245 families residing in the town. The population density was 19.2 people per square mile (7.4/km^{2}). There were 967 housing units at an average density of 19.6 per square mile (7.6/km^{2}). The racial makeup of the town was 98.41% White, 0.11% Native American, 0.42% Asian, 0.11% from other races, and 0.95% from two or more races. Hispanic or Latino of any race were 0.21% of the population.

There were 416 households, out of which 27.9% had children under the age of 18 living with them, 50.0% were married couples living together, 6.3% had a female householder with no husband present, and 40.9% were non-families. 30.0% of all households were made up of individuals, and 10.6% had someone living alone who was 65 years of age or older. The average household size was 2.27 and the average family size was 2.88.

In the town, the population was spread out, with 22.3% under the age of 18, 6.0% from 18 to 24, 31.7% from 25 to 44, 26.7% from 45 to 64, and 13.2% who were 65 years of age or older. The median age was 38 years. For every 100 females, there were 113.5 males. For every 100 females age 18 and over, there were 109.4 males.

The median income for a household in the town was $34,917, and the median income for a family was $43,333. Males had a median income of $26,818 versus $23,417 for females. The per capita income for the town was $22,052. About 5.6% of families and 10.1% of the population were below the poverty line, including 6.7% of those under age 18 and 9.8% of those age 65 or over.

== Geography ==
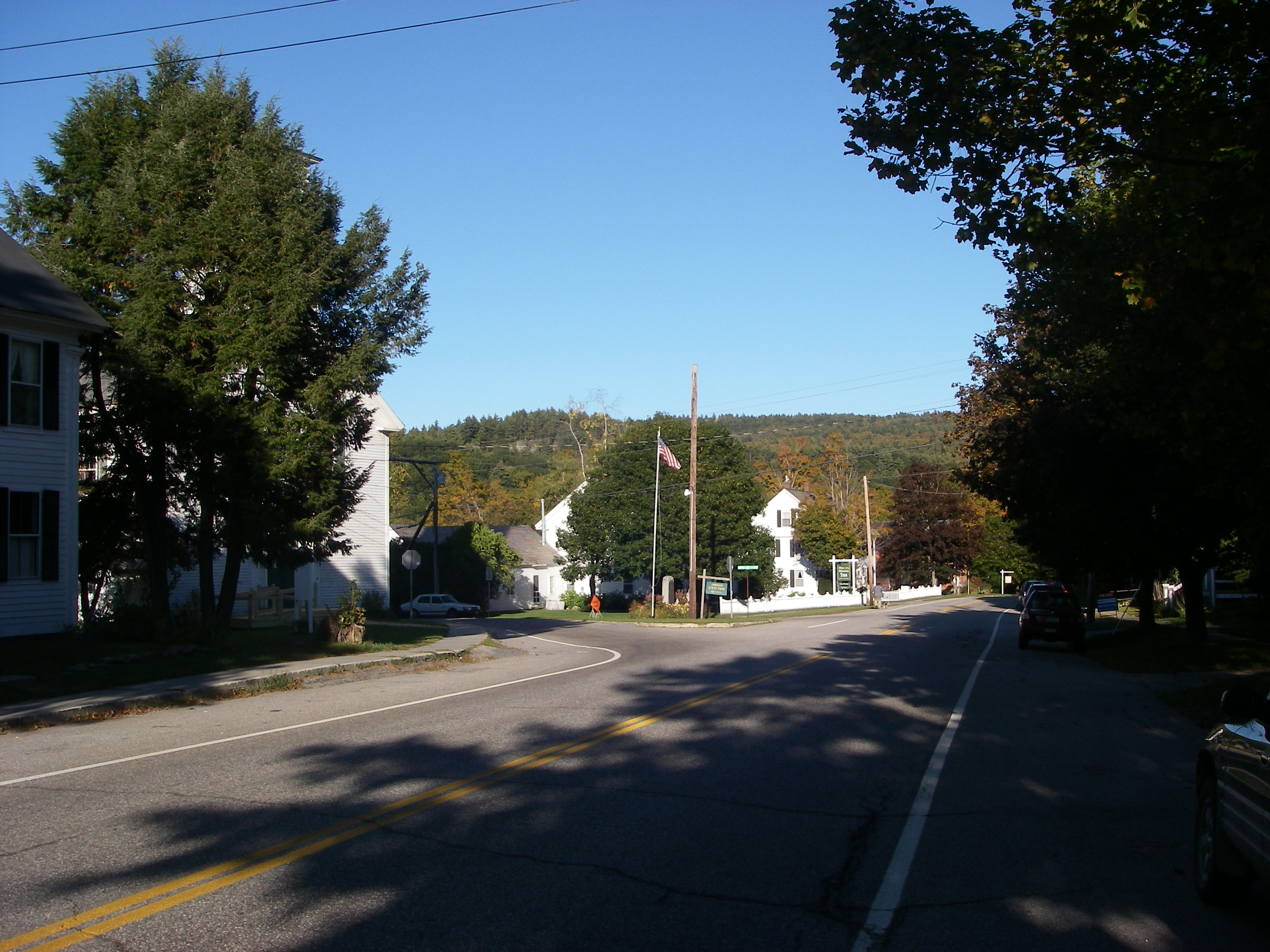
Jamaica Village Center looking south

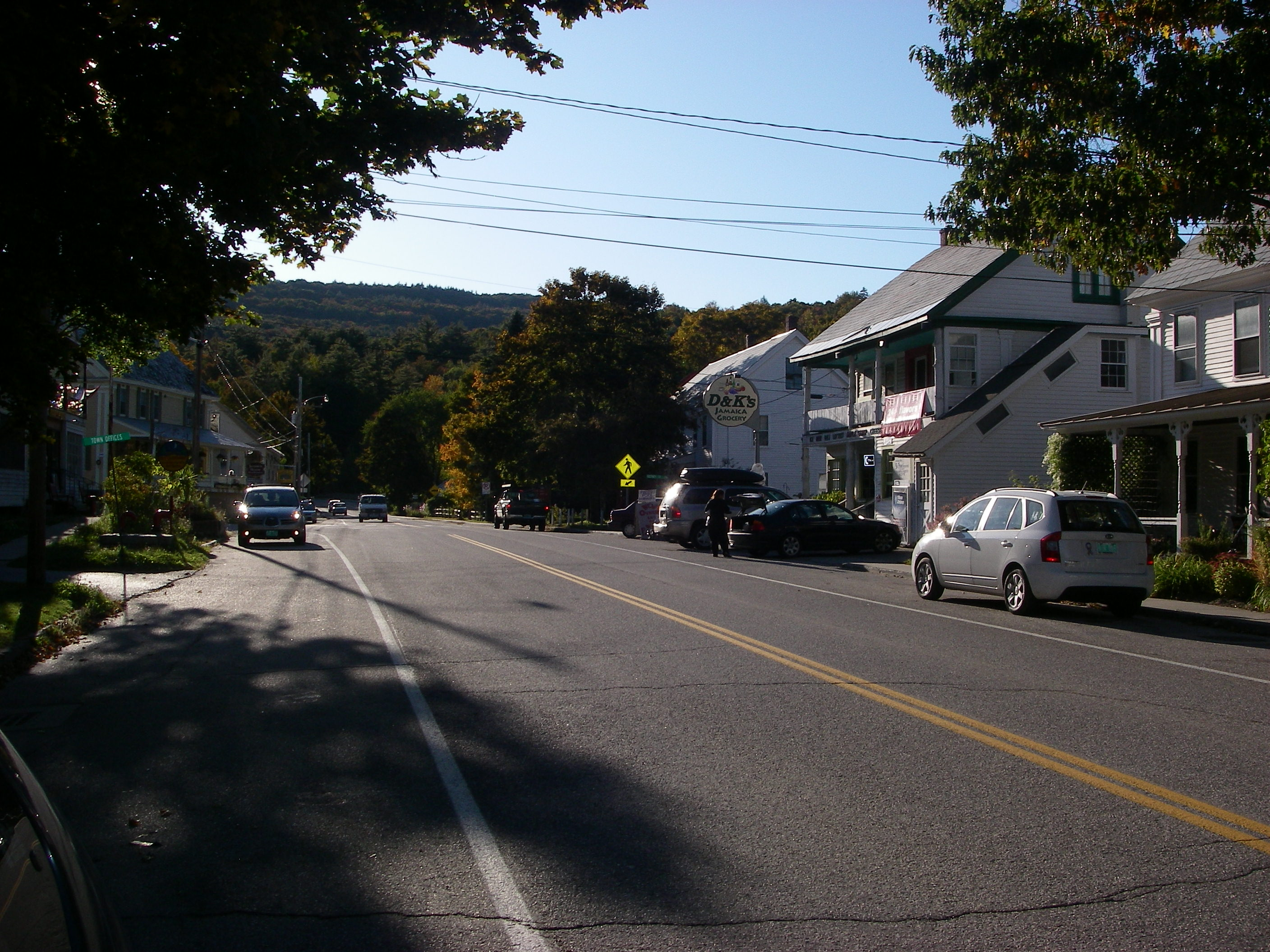
Jamaica Village Center looking north

According to the United States Census Bureau, the town has a total area of 49.5 square miles (128 km^{2}), of which 49.3 square miles (128 km^{2}) is land and 0.1 square miles (0.26 km^{2}) (0.20%) is water. The West River flows through the town. Jamaica is crossed by Vermont Route 30 (in part concurrent with Vermont Route 100).

=== Climate ===
This climatic region is typified by large seasonal temperature differences, with warm to hot (and often humid) summers and cold (sometimes severely cold) winters. According to the Köppen Climate Classification system, Jamaica has a humid continental climate, abbreviated "Dfb" on climate maps.

== Government ==
Jamaica has an annual town meeting on the first Tuesday of March each year. At Town Meeting, residents of the town deliberate and vote on an annual budget, elect municipal officials, and vote on public questions. Jamaica is one of the few towns where all business is still conducted "from the floor"—i.e. through parliamentary procedure, as even candidates for elected office are nominated from the floor.

The five-person Board of Selectmen is responsible for the general supervision of the town, with executive and legislative responsibilities. The Town Clerk is the custodian of town records (namely land records).

== Notable people ==
- Orion M. Barber, politician and United States Court of Customs and Patent Appeals judge
- Fred M. Butler, Associate Justice of the Vermont Supreme Court
- Elliot Cowdin, businessperson and politician
- Robert Cowdin, politician and American Civil War field officer
- Henry W. Downs, Civil War soldier and Medal of Honor recipient
- Edward Fisher, founder of The Royal Conservatory of Music, Toronto
- James Otis Follett, engineer
- Florence Lee, silent film actress
- Aaron Leland, minister and Lieutenant Governor of Vermont
- Increase Sumner Lincoln, minister
- Eleazer L. Waterman, Judge of the Vermont Superior Court
- John H. Watson, Chief Justice of the Vermont Supreme Court
- Hoyt Henry Wheeler, Vermont Supreme Court justice and U.S. federal judge

== Popular culture ==
The town of Jamaica is the setting for the Hallmark Christmas movie "Romance at Reindeer Lodge".
