= Follett Stone Arch Bridge Historic District =

Historic district in Vermont, United States

- U.S. National Register of Historic Places
- U.S. Historic district
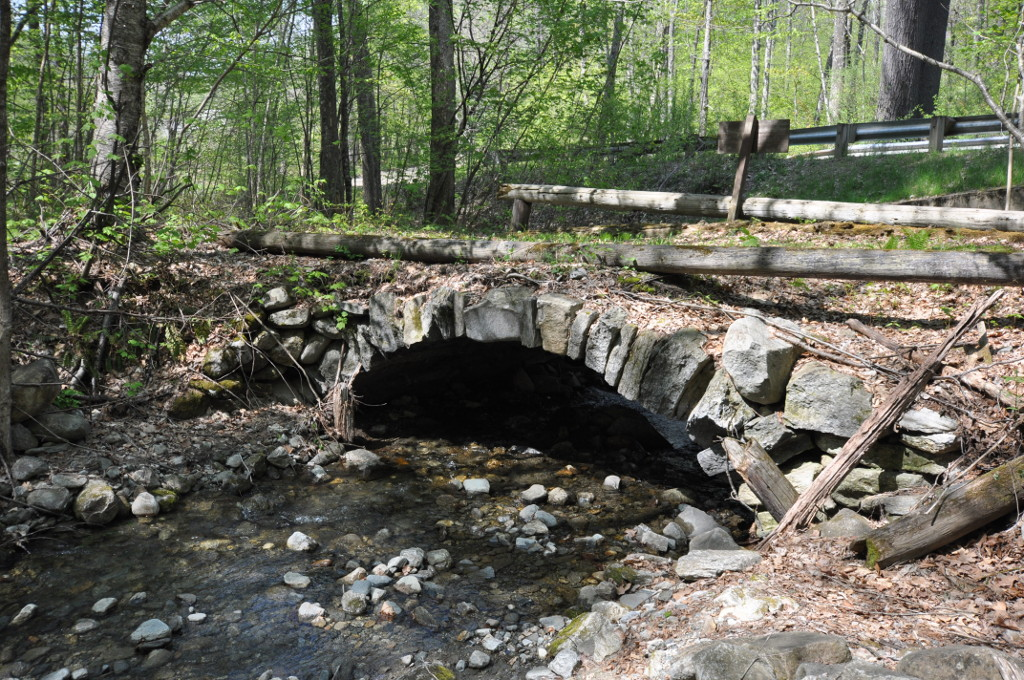
- Huzzy Brook bridge, upstream side

- Location within Vermont Location within the United States
- Nearest city: Townshend, Vermont
- Area: 160 acres (65 ha)
- Built: 1894
- Built by: James Otis Follett
- NRHP reference No.: 76000150
- Added to NRHP: December 12, 1976

The Follett Stone Arch Bridge Historic District encompasses a group of four stone arch bridges in southwestern Townshend, Vermont. All four bridges were built by James Otis Follett, a local self-taught mason, between 1894 and 1910, and represent the single greatest concentration of surviving bridges he built. The district was listed on the National Register of Historic Places in 1976.

== Description and history ==
James Otis Follett was a local farmer, who apparently learned the craft of bridge-building from books and his experiences as a road commissioner. Between 1894 and his death in 1911 he is estimated to have built at least forty stone arch bridges, most in Townshend and immediately adjacent communities. This assemblage is particularly noteworthy, as most bridges of the time were being built using iron and steel. Southwest of Townshend's village center, crossing streams on the west side of the West River downstream of Townshend Dam are four of his bridges. The surrounding area once had seven, but three have been demolished or washed away.

=== Fair Brook Bridge ===
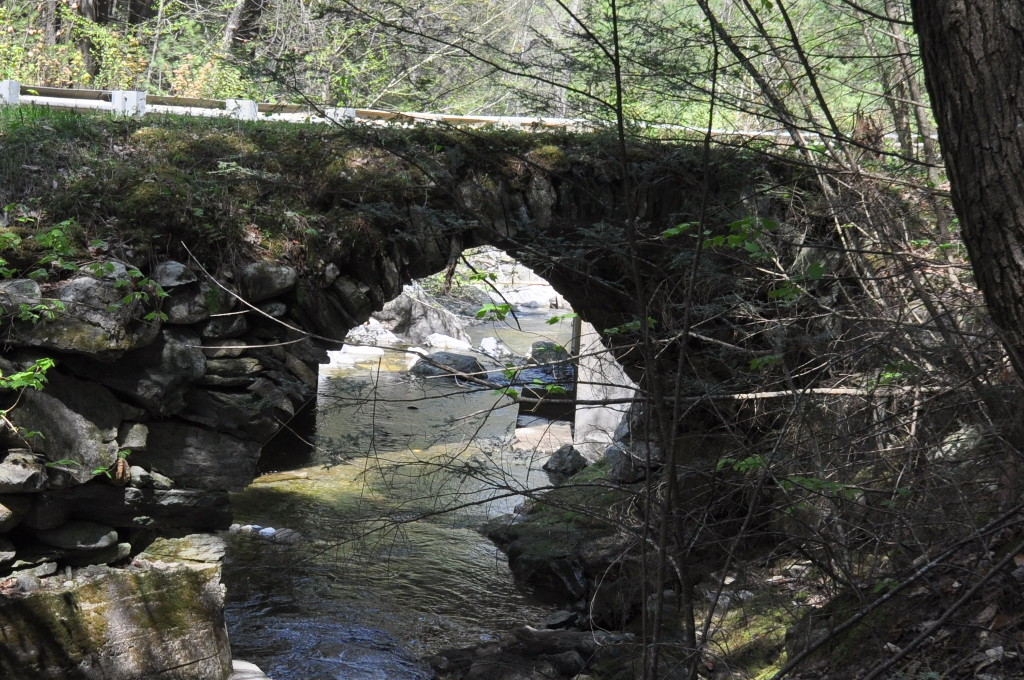
Fair Brook bridge, upstream side

Located just upstream of State Forest/West Hill Road (about 43°02′51.6″N 72°42′33.9″W), where it cross Fair Brook about 0.1 miles (0.16 km) west of the intersection with Dam Road, is the largest of the four bridges. The arch has a span of about 22 feet (6.7 m) and rests on abutments that are part on a stone abutment and partly on bedrock. One of the abutments is angled, suggesting it was built for an earlier bridge.

=== Rogers Road Bridge ===
The Rogers Road Bridge is located near 43°02′51.6″N 72°42′33.9″W off the end of a spur of Rogers Road, that extends northwest from the Scott Covered Bridge. Rogers Road was bisected by construction of the Townshend Dam. This bridge crosses a normally dry channel of Fair Brook, and is one of Follett's smaller bridges. It has a span of 10 feet (3.0 m) and rises about 3.5 feet (1.1 m) above the stream bed.

=== Buck Hill Road Bridge ===
This bridge crosses another intermittent stream on a logging road (about 43°02′46.2″N 72°41′52.8″W) that is a former alignment of Buck Hill Road, which is now a short spur extending south from the Scott Covered Bridge. It has a span of 7.5 feet (2.3 m) and a height of 3 feet (0.91 m).

=== James and Susanna Huzzy Brook Bridge ===
The James and Susanna Huzzy Brook Bridge, located at about 43°02′33.5″N 72°41′35.6″W, formerly carried State Forest Road across James and Susanna Huzzy Brook, right near an entrance to Townshend State Forest. This bridge has a span of 14.5 feet (4.4 m) and a height of 5 feet (1.5 m). Like the other bridges, its width is limited to a single modern vehicular travel lane. It is located just upstream of the current State Forest Road bridge.

== See also ==
- National Register of Historic Places listings in Windham County, Vermont
- List of bridges on the National Register of Historic Places in Vermont
