= South Londonderry, Vermont =

Census-designated place in Vermont, United States

- Census-designated place
- Location within Vermont Location within the United States
- Coordinates: 43°11′25″N 72°48′43″W
- Country: United States
- State: Vermont
- County: Windham
- Town: Londonderry

Area
  - Total: 0.64 sq mi (1.66 km^{2})
  - Land: 0.62 sq mi (1.61 km^{2})
  - Water: 0.019 sq mi (0.05 km^{2})
- Elevation: 1,040 ft (320 m)

Population (2020)
  - Total: 147
- Time zone: UTC-5 (Eastern (EST))
  - Summer (DST): UTC-4 (EDT)
- ZIP Code: 05155
- Area code: 802
- FIPS code: 50-67225
- GNIS feature ID: 2807164

South Londonderry is an unincorporated village and census-designated place (CDP) in the town of Londonderry, Windham County, Vermont, United States. As of the 2020 census, it had a population of 147. The center of the village comprises the South Londonderry Village Historic District.

== Geography ==
The CDP is in northwestern Windham County, in the south-central part of the town of Londonderry. It sits on both sides of the West River, a southeast-flowing tributary of the Connecticut River. Vermont Route 100 passes through the community, leading north 2.5 miles (4.0 km) to Londonderry village and south 9 miles (14 km) to Jamaica.
