= West Dummerston, Vermont =

Census-designated place in Vermont, United States

- Census-designated place
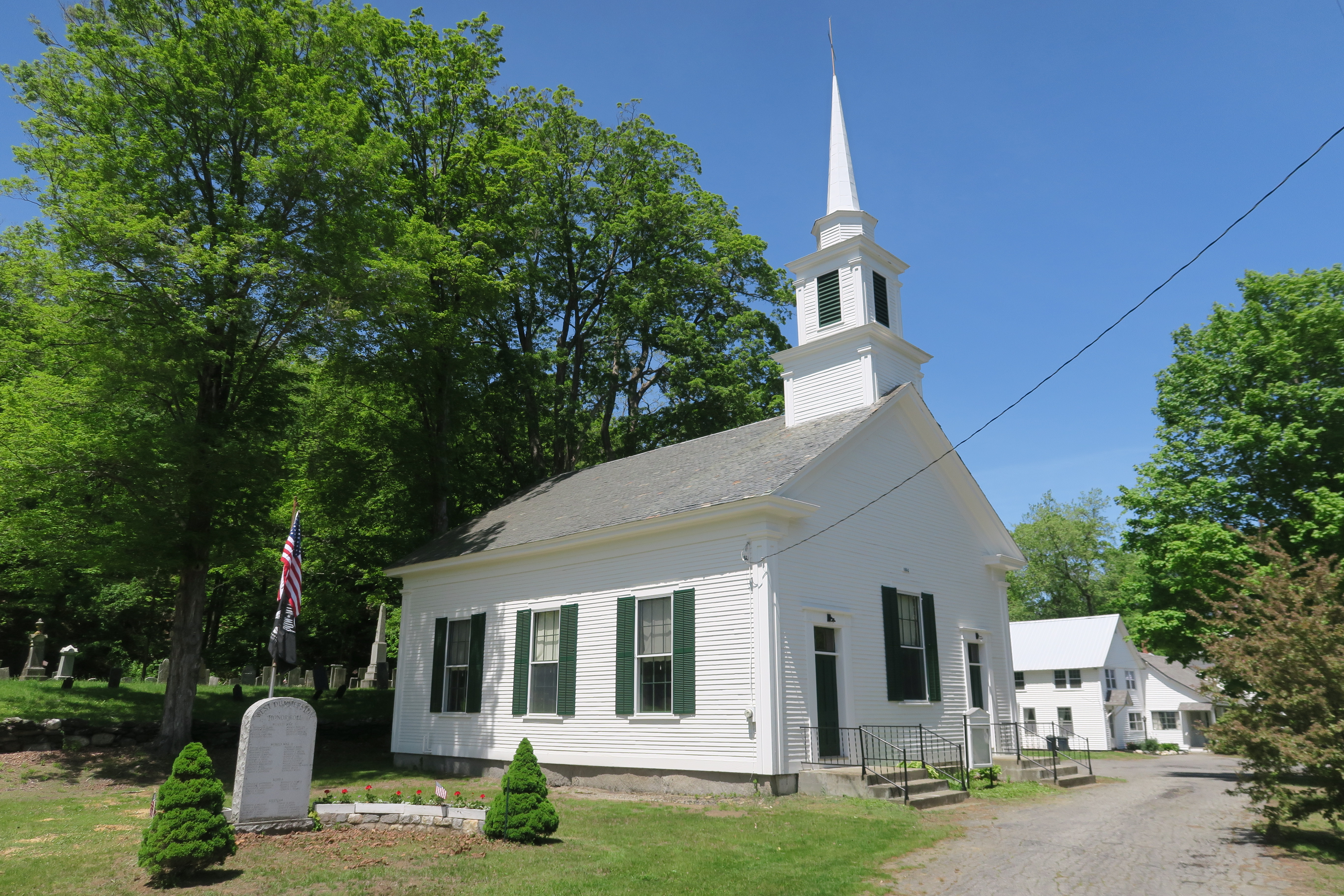
- West Dummerston Baptist Church

- Location within Vermont Location within the United States
- Coordinates: 42°55′47″N 72°36′46″W
- Country: United States
- State: Vermont
- County: Windham
- Town: Dummerston
- Elevation: 351 ft (107 m)
- Time zone: UTC-5 (Eastern (EST))
  - Summer (DST): UTC-4 (EDT)
- ZIP code: 05357
- Area code: 802
- GNIS feature ID: 2807167

West Dummerston is an unincorporated village and census-designated place (CDP) in the town of Dummerston, Windham County, Vermont, United States. As of the 2020 census, West Dummerston had a population of 77. The community is located along Vermont Route 30 and the West River, 6 miles (9.7 km) north-northwest of Brattleboro. West Dummerston has a post office with ZIP code 05357.
