= West Townshend Stone Arch Bridge =

- U.S. National Register of Historic Places
- U.S. Historic district – Contributing property
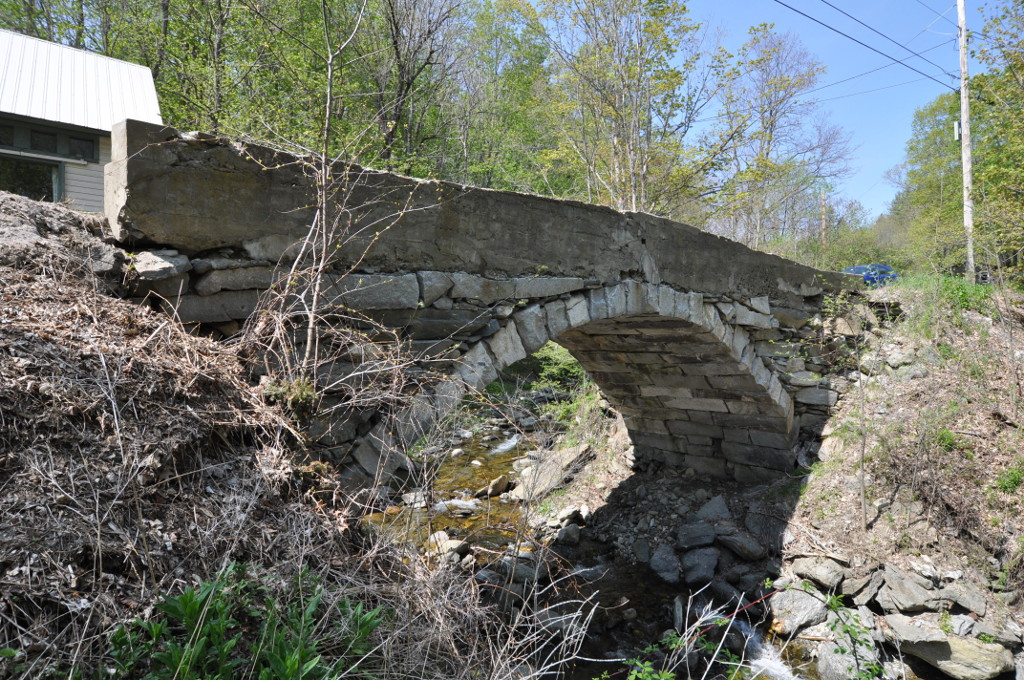

- Location within Vermont Location within the United States
- Location: Spans Tannery Brook, West Townshend, Vermont
- Coordinates: 43°5′3″N 72°42′36″W
- Area: less than one acre
- Built: c. 1910
- Built by: James Otis Follett
- Part of: West Townshend Village Historic District (ID86001502)
- NRHP reference No.: 77000106

Significant dates
- Added to NRHP: April 18, 1977
- Designated CP: September 11, 1986

The West Townshend Stone Arch Bridge carries Round Hill Road across Tannery Brook in the village of West Townshend, Vermont. Built about 1910, it is one of the few surviving bridges of a group built by local mason James Otis Follett in the early 20th century. It was listed on the National Register of Historic Places in 1977.

== Description and history ==
The West Townshend Stone Arch Bridge is located in the rural village of West Townshend, a few miles up the West River from the center of Townshend. It is located on Round Hill Road, a dead-end local road off Back Windham Road, just north of Vermont Route 30. The bridge is a single span stone arch, formed out of rough-cut and rubble stone, laid in irregular courses. The arch spans about 37 feet (11 m), and rises about 16 feet (4.9 m) above Tannery Brook. The arch is about 14 feet (4.3 m) wide, providing enough space for a single travel lane by modern vehicles. The west end of the bridge is laid on bedrock, while the east end includes wing walls of rubblestone extending in both directions. The arch spandrels are filled with uncoursed dry-laid rubblestone, with the roadbed built up above.

This bridge is one of more than about 40 built in Towshend and other nearby communities by James Otis Follett, a self-educated local mason. Of thirteen bridges built by Follett in Townshend, only six survived when this bridge was listed on the National Register of Historic Places in 1977. Follett's entire opus is distinctive, as it was produced at a time when most bridges were built with iron and steel.

== See also ==
- A view looking across Follett's Bridge.
- List of bridges on the National Register of Historic Places in Vermont
- National Register of Historic Places listings in Windham County, Vermont
