= West Dummerston Covered Bridge =

- U.S. National Register of Historic Places
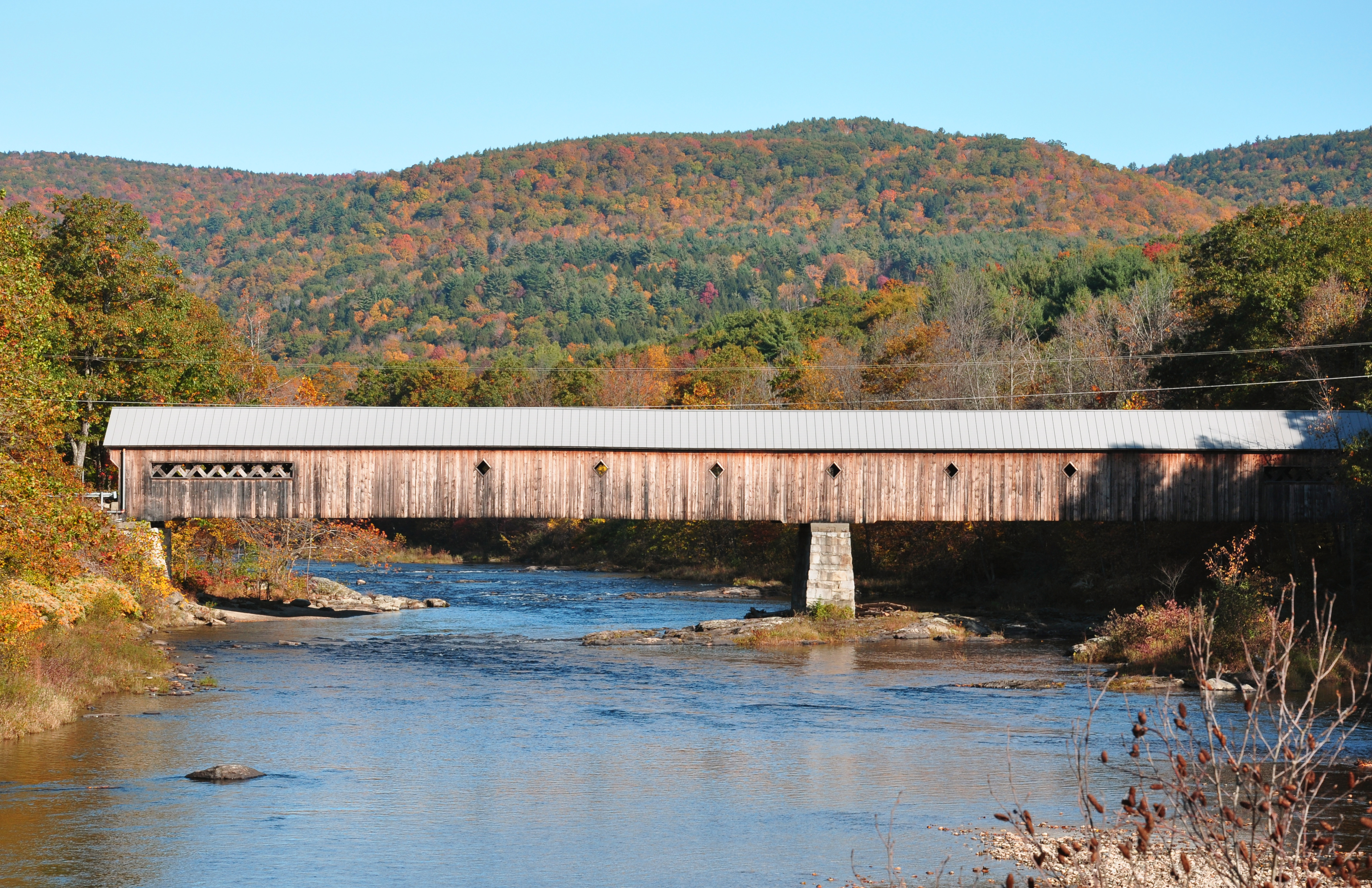

- Location within Vermont Location within the United States
- Location: East-West Rd. and VT 30, over West River, Dummerston, Vermont
- Coordinates: 42°56′12″N 72°36′49″W
- Area: 1 acre (0.40 ha)
- Built: 1872
- Architect: Lamson, Caleb B.
- Architectural style: Town lattice truss
- NRHP reference No.: 73000207
- Added to NRHP: May 08, 1973

The West Dummerston Covered Bridge is a historic covered bridge spanning the West River in Dummerston, Vermont, between Vermont Route 30 and Camp Arden Road. Built in 1872, it is at 280 feet (85 m) the longest covered bridge entirely within the state of Vermont. It was listed on the National Register of Historic Places in 1973.

== Description and history ==
The West Dummerston Covered Bridge is located in west-central Dummerston, a short way north of the village of West Dummerston. It spans the West River in a roughly east–west direction, and is mounted on stone abutments and a central stone pier. The bridge consists of two spans, each supported by Town lattice trusses, and has a total structure length of 280 feet (85 m). The sides of the bridge are finished in flush vertical boards, and the ends are sheathed in wooden clapboards. The roof is of corrugated metal, laid over an older wooden shingle roof. The side walls have diamond-shaped openings cut in them to admit additional light.

The bridge was built in 1872 by master builder Caleb Lamson, and is the only known surviving example of his work in Windham County. It is the longest covered bridge entirely within the state: the Scott Covered Bridge in Townshend is 277 feet (84 m) long, and the Cornish–Windsor Covered Bridge (spanning the Connecticut River into New Hampshire) is the nation's longest, at 449 feet (137 m).

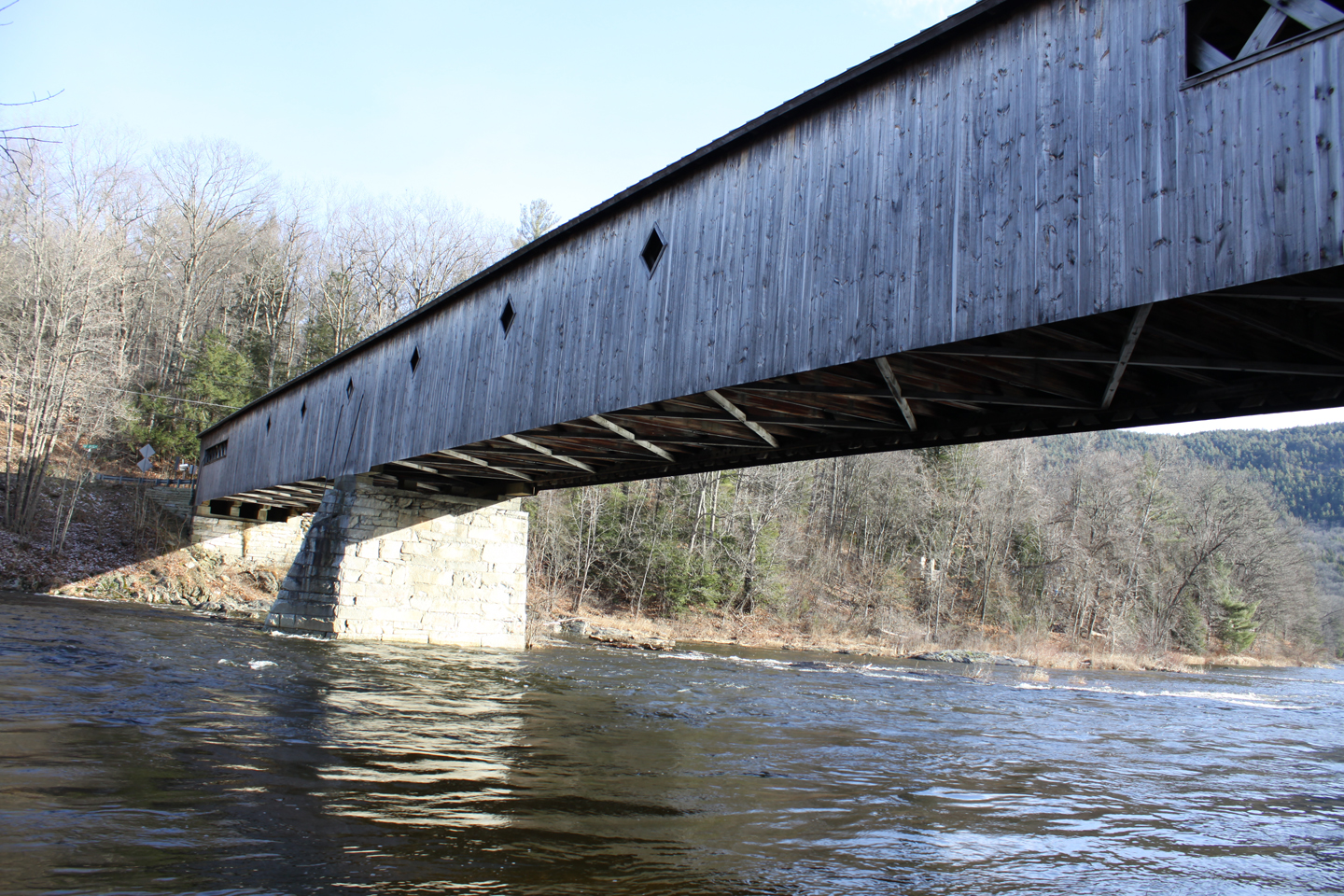
West Dummerston Covered Bridge from the level of the river in 2015

West view of the bridge in 2025

== See also ==
- List of Vermont covered bridges
- National Register of Historic Places listings in Windham County, Vermont
- List of bridges on the National Register of Historic Places in Vermont
