= South Londonderry Village Historic District =

Historic district in Vermont, United States

- U.S. National Register of Historic Places
- U.S. Historic district
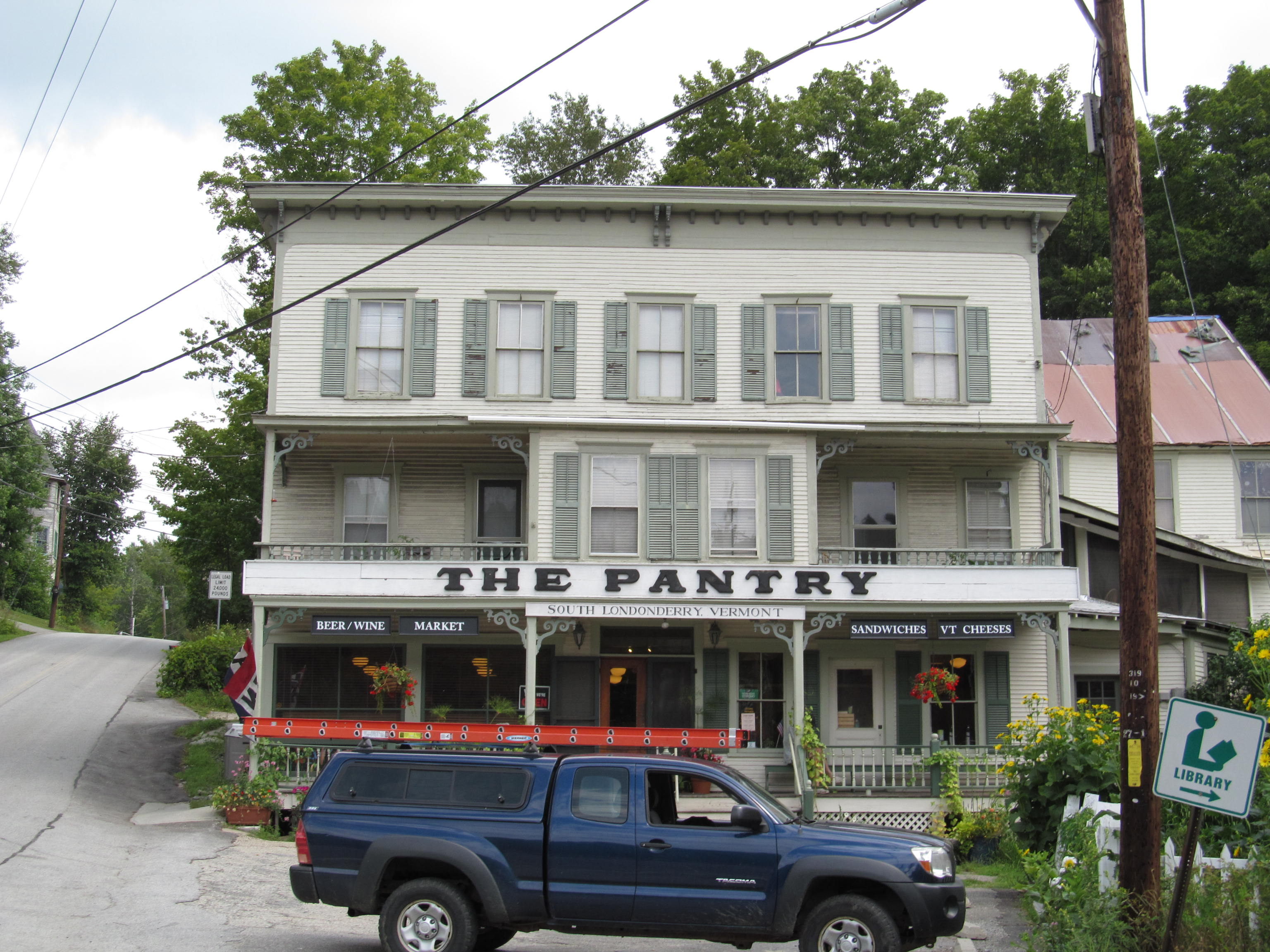
- The Pantry, South Londonderry

- Location within Vermont Location within the United States
- Location: Church, Main, River, School, and Farnum Sts., and Melendy Hill Rd., South Londonderry, Vermont
- Coordinates: 43°11′18″N 72°48′43″W
- Area: 75 acres (30 ha)
- Architectural style: Late Victorian, Greek Revival, Victorian Vernacular
- NRHP reference No.: 86001943
- Added to NRHP: July 24, 1986

The South Londonderry Village Historic District encompasses a significant portion of the historic developed area of the village of South Londonderry, Vermont. The village has a well-preserved mid-19th century core, with most of its major development history taking place between about 1806 and 1860. The district was listed on the National Register of Historic Places in 1986.

== Description and history ==
South Londonderry Village is located in south-central Londonderry, and is built along both sides of the West River, which flows roughly southeast toward the Connecticut River. Vermont Route 100 runs through the village, paralleling the river to the north and running more directly south on the south side of the river. Main Street flanks the river on it northern bank, while Winhall Hollow Road and West River Road flank it on the south side. Running perpendicular to the single bridge spanning the river in the village center are Melendy Hill Road to the south and Middletown Road to the north.

The village grew in the early 19th century around this area because the drop in elevation of the river provided water power for early industrial works. Most of these industrial sites are now little more than foundations, including ones from early in the 20th century. Three dams were built across the river at various points, the largest directly upstream of the bridge. Residential construction was hemmed in by the steep hillsides, resulting in a generally linear pattern of development on either side of the river. Most of the houses are wood frame structures 1-1/2 to 2-1/2 stories in height, and most have modest decorative styling from popular 19th-century architectural styles. There are two 19th-century church buildings, two former school buildings, and the 1860 Londonderry Town House, which houses municipal offices and auditorium and meeting spaces.

== See also ==
- National Register of Historic Places listings in Windham County, Vermont
