= Jamaica (CDP), Vermont =

Census-designated place in Vermont, United States

Jamaica, Vermont
- Census-designated place
- Location within Vermont Location within the United States
- Coordinates: 43°05′52″N 72°46′44″W
- Country: United States
- State: Vermont
- County: Windham
- Town: Jamaica

Area
  - Total: 0.78 sq mi (2.02 km^{2})
  - Land: 0.77 sq mi (1.99 km^{2})
  - Water: 0.012 sq mi (0.03 km^{2})
- Elevation: 830 ft (250 m)

Population (2020)
  - Total: 174
- Time zone: UTC-5 (Eastern (EST))
  - Summer (DST): UTC-4 (EDT)
- ZIP Code: 05343
- Area code: 802
- FIPS code: 50-36100
- GNIS feature ID: 2807162

Jamaica is the central village and a census-designated place (CDP) in the town of Jamaica, Windham County, Vermont, United States. As of the 2020 census, it had a population of 174, compared to 1,005 in the entire town.

The CDP is in northwestern Windham County, in the center of the town of Jamaica. It sits on the eastern side of the Green Mountains in the valley of Ball Mountain Brook where it joins the West River, a southeast-flowing tributary of the Connecticut River. Jamaica State Park is on the West River on the northern edge of the village. 1,755-foot (535 m) Ball Mountain rises to the north over the West River, while 2,093-foot (638 m) College Hill rises to the west.

Vermont Routes 30 and 100 pass concurrently through the center of Jamaica. Route 30 leads northwest over the Green Mountains 20 miles (32 km) to Manchester Center and southeast down the West River valley 26 miles (42 km) to Brattleboro, while Route 100 leads north 11 miles (18 km) to Londonderry and south 25 miles (40 km) to Wilmington.
