= Scott Covered Bridge (Townshend, Vermont) =

- U.S. National Register of Historic Places
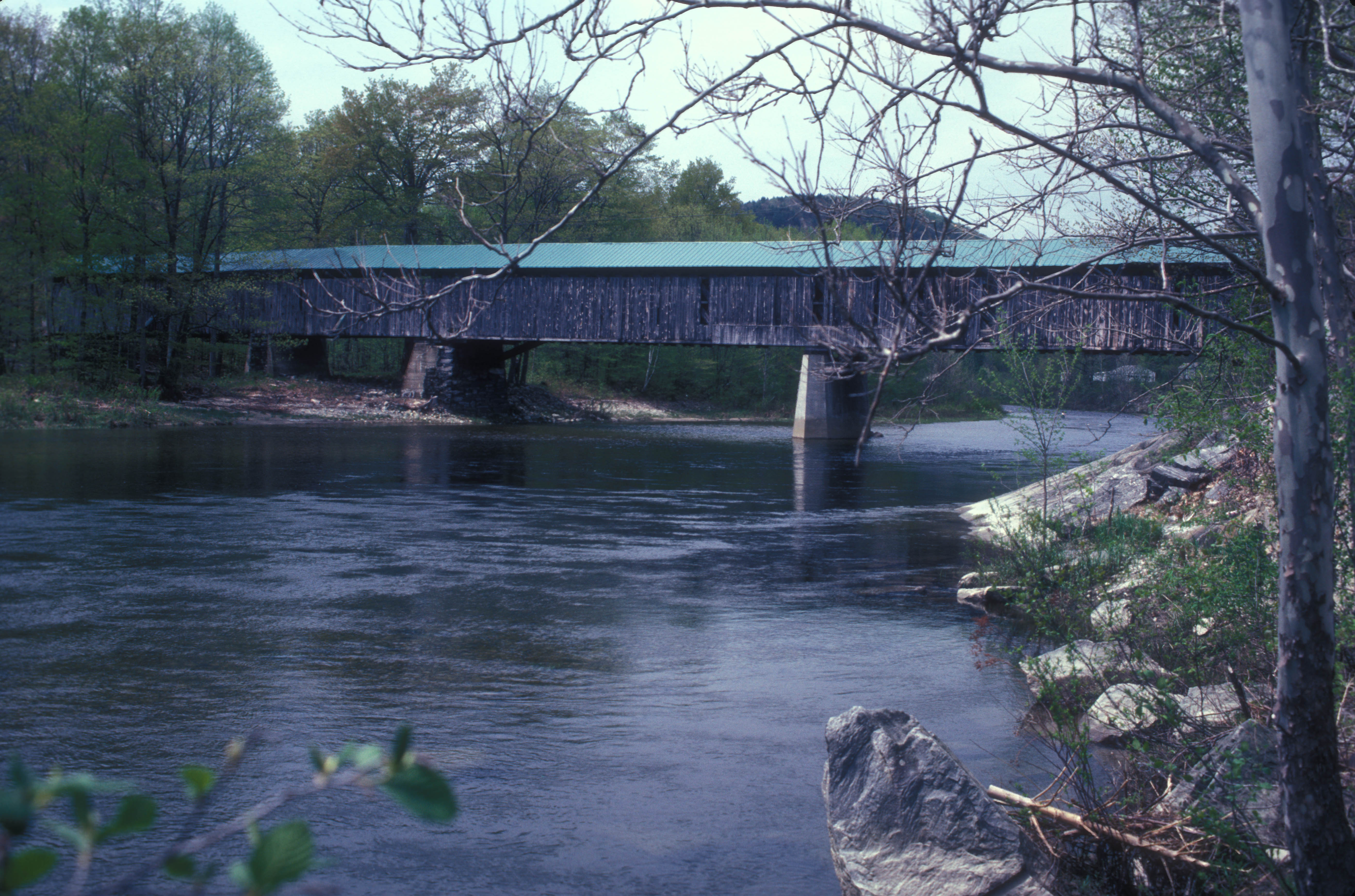
- 1970 photo

- Location within Vermont Location within the United States
- Nearest city: Townshend, Vermont
- Coordinates: 43°2′53″N 72°41′50″W
- Area: 1 acre (0.40 ha)
- Built: 1870
- Architectural style: Town lattice truss
- NRHP reference No.: 73000206
- Added to NRHP: August 28, 1973

Scott Covered Bridge is a covered bridge spanning the West River in Townshend, Vermont. Built in 1870, it is at 277 feet (84 m) one of the longest covered bridges in the state (the West Dummerston Covered Bridge is longer by three feet), exhibiting three different forms of support: a Town lattice truss, kingpost trusses, and laminated arches. The bridge was listed on the National Register of Historic Places in 1973. It is closed to motor vehicle traffic.

== Description and history ==
The Scott Covered Bridge is located west of Townshend's main village, spanning the West River just west of Vermont Route 30 south of Townshend Dam. The bridge consists of three spans: a main Town lattice truss span that is 166 feet (51 m) long, and two kingspost truss spans with a combined length of 111 feet (34 m). The Town lattice truss has been strengthened with laminated arches. The bridge has a total width of 20 feet (6.1 m), and a roadway width of 16 feet (4.9 m). The sides and gable ends of the bridge are sheathed with vertical board siding.

The bridge was constructed in 1870, with original ownership by the town of Townshend. Originally, the kingspost trusses were exposed, but they were covered in 1873. The bridge was ceded to the Vermont Historical Commission (later the Vermont Division for Historic Preservation) in 1955 and subsequently added to the National Register of Historic Places in 1973. The bridge has been modified on four occasions to improve the structural stability: adding a concrete facing to the piers in 1915; adding structural support beams in 1961, and a concrete pier in 1981. The bridge was closed to foot traffic in 2012, after a routine inspection showed serious structural integrity issues.

In May 2017, the Scott Covered Bridge was reopened to foot and bicycle traffic after a $2.35 million repair project administered by the Vermont Agency of Transportation and the Vermont Division for Historic Preservation.

== See also ==
- National Register of Historic Places listings in Windham County, Vermont
- List of bridges on the National Register of Historic Places in Vermont
- List of Vermont covered bridges
