= West Townshend, Vermont =

- West Townshend Village Historic District
- U.S. National Register of Historic Places
- U.S. Historic district
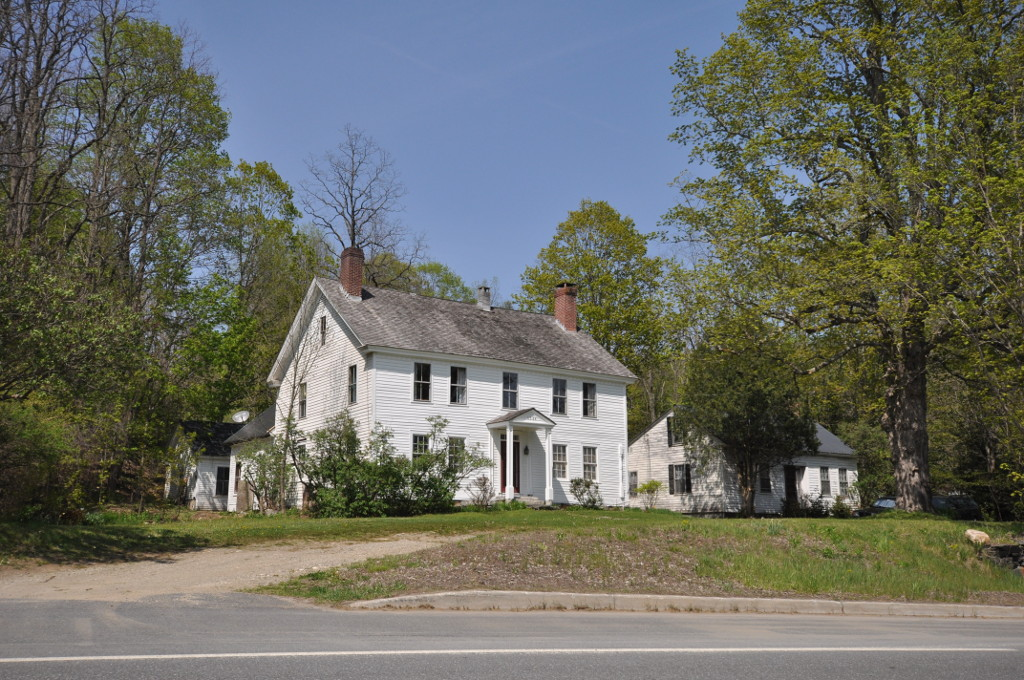

- Location within Vermont Location within the United States
- Location: Roughly Main St. from Old Rt. 30 to VT 30 and Town Rds. 7, 23, 47, 49, and 50, Townshend, Vermont
- Coordinates: 43°4′55″N 72°42′38″W
- Area: 80 acres (32 ha)
- Built: 1800
- Architect: Parkhurst, Samuel; Et al.
- Architectural style: Greek Revival, Queen Anne, Federal
- NRHP reference No.: 86001502
- Added to NRHP: September 11, 1986

West Townshend is an unincorporated village in Townshend, Vermont, United States. It is on the north side of a bend in the West River, upriver of the Townshend Dam. The entire village is listed on the National Register of Historic Places as the West Townshend Village Historic District. Its ZIP codes are 05359 and 05353.

== Geography ==
West Townshend is in central western Townshend. It is at the northern edge of a bend in the West River, which flows northward from the west, around the bend and then southward to the Townshend Dam, several miles downriver. The river valley has relatively steep hillsides, with a floodplain that widens at the bend that was deemed suitable for agriculture. Most of the village is strung out along Vermont Route 30, which is aligned to be above the highest waters of Townshend Lake, which was created by the dam. A few town roads extend northward, following branches of Tannery Brook, and an old alignment of VT 30 at the west end of the village also has a few houses.

== History ==
Townshend was chartered in 1753, but was not settled until the 1760s, after the French and Indian War. Samuel Fletcher, a Massachusetts native, came to the area that is West Townshend, and built the first frame house in Townshend in about 1785, which survives in part in the southeastern part of the village. The village grew around sawmills and gristmills built along Tannery Brook, and reached its height of population and industry in the mid-19th century. The village suffered significant damage in the New England Hurricane of 1938, and was further reduced with the construction of Townshend Dam in the 1950s, which forced a realignment of VT 30.

The village was designated a historic district and listed on the National Register of Historic Places in 1986. It includes, on one of the town roads off VT 30, the West Townshend Stone Arch Bridge, built by Townshend native James Otis Follett in the early 20th century.

== See also ==
- National Register of Historic Places listings in Windham County, Vermont
- West Townshend old Congregational Church - mislabeled from tourist photo.
