= Simpsonville Stone Arch Bridge =

- U.S. National Register of Historic Places
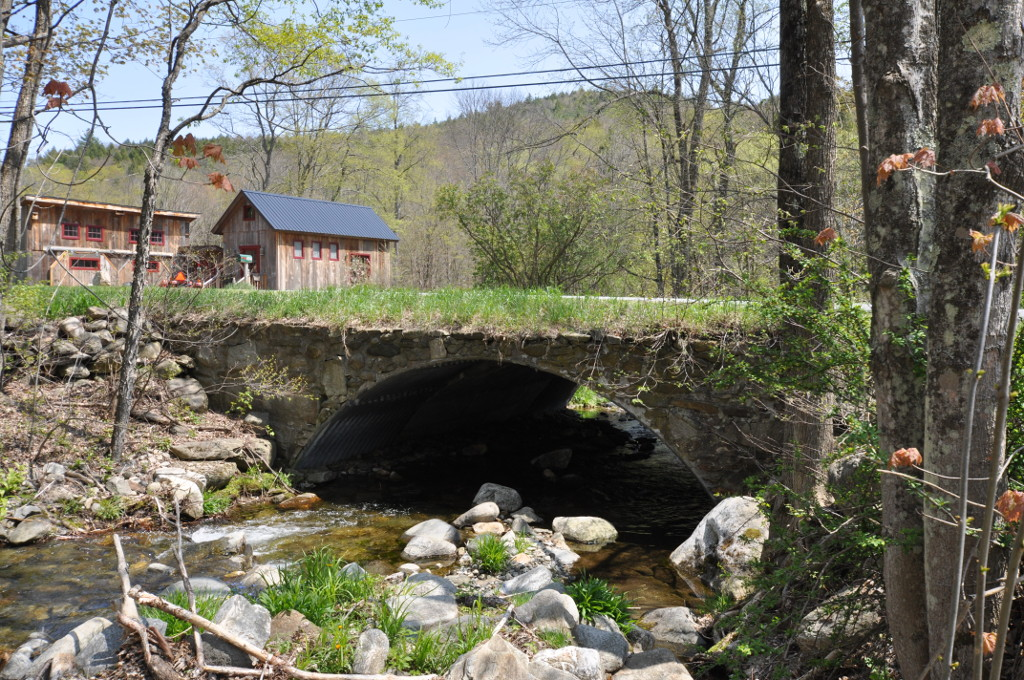
- From upstream, in 2016

- Location within Vermont Location within the United States
- Location: VT 35, Townshend, Vermont
- Coordinates: 43°4′13″N 72°39′19″W
- Area: less than one acre
- Built: 1909
- Built by: James Otis Follett
- NRHP reference No.: 77000105
- Added to NRHP: April 11, 1977

The Simpsonville Stone Arch Bridge is a historic stone arch bridge, carrying Vermont Route 35 across Simpson Brook, north of the village of Townshend, Vermont. Built about 1909, it is one of a few surviving bridges in the region built by local mason James Otis Follett. It was listed on the National Register of Historic Places in 1977.

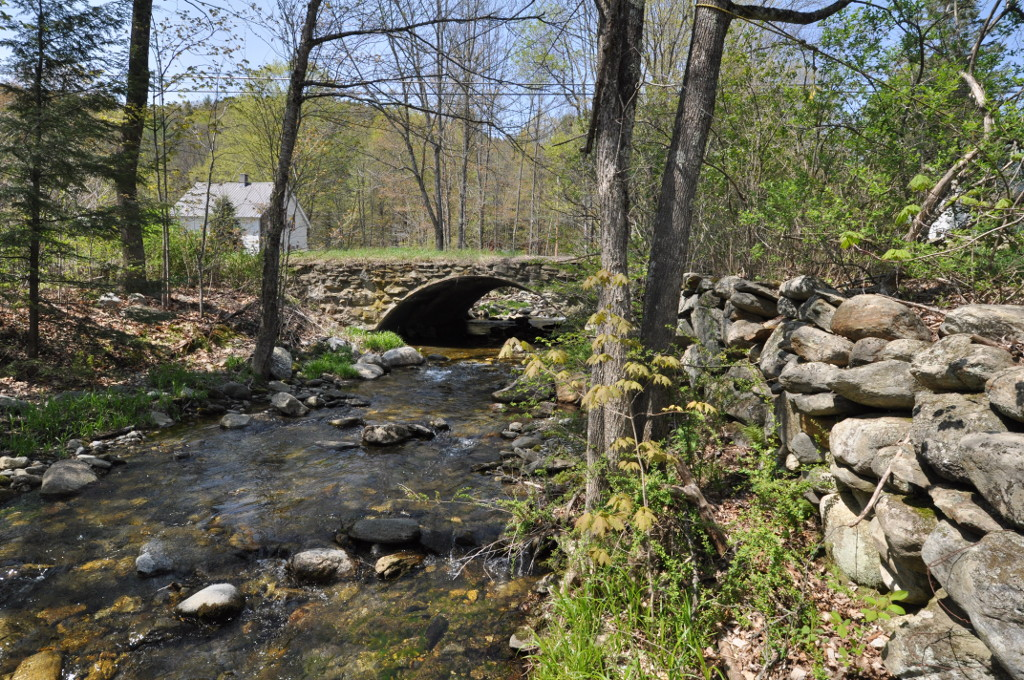
From downstream

== Description and history ==
The Simpsonville Bridge is located on Grafton Road (Vermont Route 35) about 2 miles (3.2 km) north of the village of Townshend, spanning Simpson Brook just east of the junction with Simpson Brook Road. The bridge is built out of rough-cut and roughly-course granite blocks, now mortared with a variety of materials. The arch has a span of 18 feet (5.5 m) and a height above the brook of about 6 feet (1.8 m). The stone portion of the structure has a total length of about 20 feet (6.1 m). The wing walls obscure portions of the arch, including its spandrels and abutments The bridge has been widened by the addition of steel culverts to both sides, further obscuring the original structure. The bridge is topped by a gravel base and paved roadway, and has a total width of 35 feet (11 m), including the culvert extensions.

This bridge is one of more than about 40 built in Towshend and other nearby communities by James Otis Follett, a local mason. Of thirteen bridges built by Follett in Townshend, only six survived when this bridge was listed on the National Register of Historic Places in 1977. Follett's entire opus is distinctive, as it was produced at a time when most bridges were built with iron and steel. This appears to have been one of the last he built before his death in 1911.

== See also ==
- National Register of Historic Places listings in Windham County, Vermont
- List of bridges on the National Register of Historic Places in Vermont
