= Robert Cowdin =

American politician

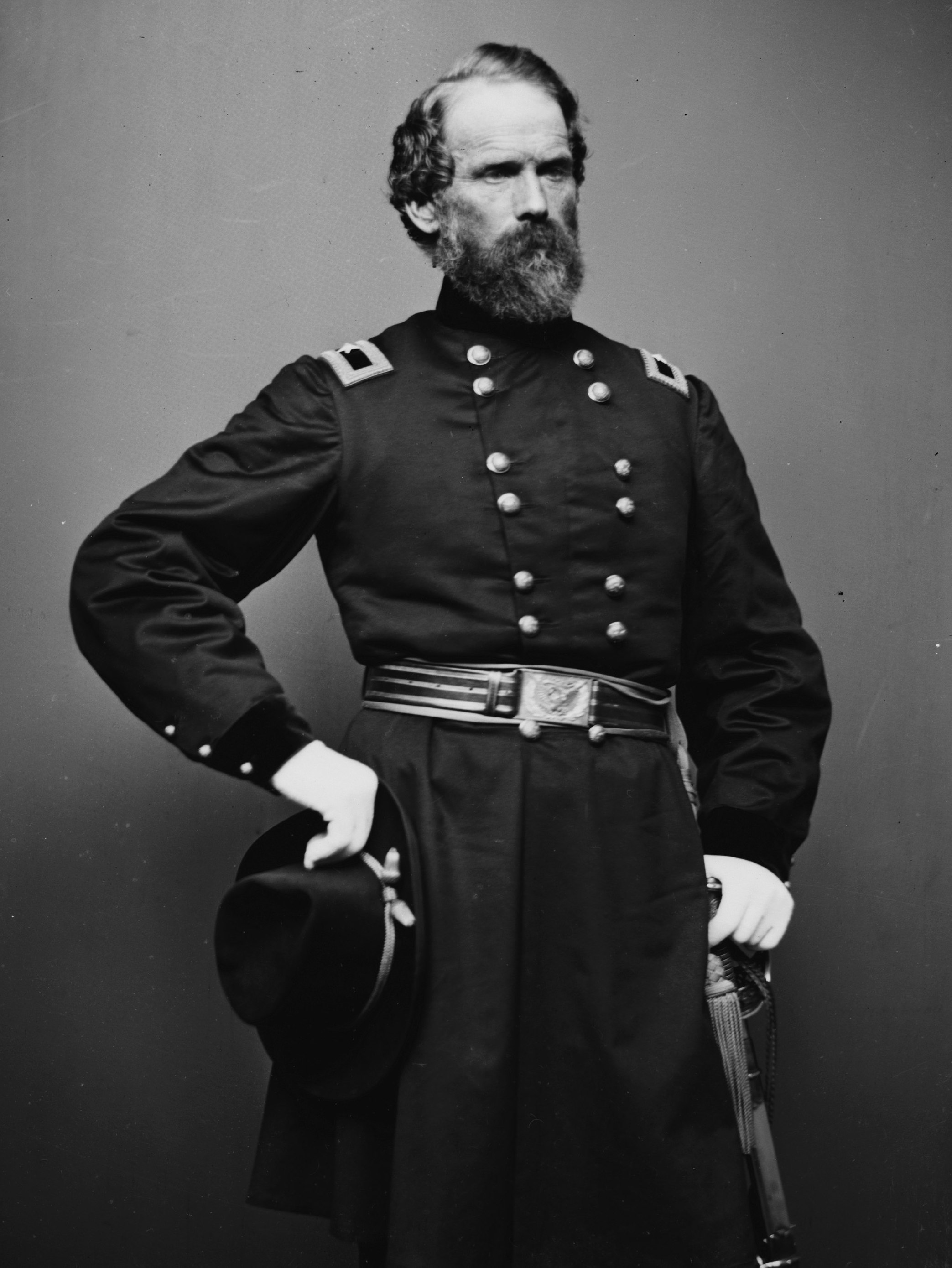
- Robert Cowdin
- Born: September 18, 1805; Jamaica, Vermont
- Died: July 9, 1874 (aged 68); Boston, Massachusetts
- Burial place: Mount Auburn Cemetery, Cambridge, Massachusetts
- Military career
- Allegiance: United States of America; Union
- Branch: United States Army; Union Army
- Service years: 1861 - 1863
- Rank: Brigadier General
- Conflicts: American Civil War; First Battle of Bull Run

Robert Cowdin (September 18, 1805 – July 9, 1874) was a businessman, a field officer in the Union Army during the American Civil War and a local politician in Massachusetts. Cowdin was colonel of the 1st Massachusetts Infantry and served in several major battles early in the war. He was appointed brigadier general of volunteers September 26, 1862 and he then commanded a brigade in the defenses of Washington until March 1863. He did not become a full brigadier general because his appointment expired by law March 4, 1862 when the U.S. Senate adjourned without confirming it. His grade reverted to colonel but after being relieved of command of the brigade, he returned home and saw no further service.

== Biography ==
Cowdin (occasionally misspelled as Cowden or Coudin) was born in Jamaica, Vermont, the son of Angier and Abiah (Carter) Cowdin. He moved to Boston at age 20 to engage in the lumber business. He served in various organizations in the state militia from 1838 until the start of the Civil War. He also served on the Common Council of Boston for eight years, and various elected positions in the city's correctional system.

== Civil War ==
Cowdin was colonel of the 2nd Massachusetts Militia Regiment at the start of the war, and was appointed colonel of the 1st Massachusetts Infantry on May 25, 1861. He led his regiment at the battle of Blackburn's Ford on July 18, 1861, was part of Israel B. Richardson's brigade of Daniel Tyler's Division at the First Battle of Bull Run, where his horse was killed. He also saw action at Williamsburg, Fair Oaks, Glendale, Malvern Hill and Chantilly.

On September 26, 1862, based on a recommendation by General Joseph Hooker, he was appointed Brigadier General of Volunteers, and commanded the 1st Brigade, Abercrombie's Division, Defenses of Washington (later called the XXII Corps), from October 1862 to February 1863, then the 2nd Brigade until the end of March. On March 4, Congress adjourned without approving his commission, and he was relieved of duty on March 30, and returned to Massachusetts.

== Postwar life ==
During the next 11 years, Cowdin served a combined 10 terms on the Boston Common Council and the Boston Board of Aldermen and served as Captain of the Ancient and Honorable Artillery Company of Massachusetts. He died in Boston, Massachusetts, and is buried in Mount Auburn Cemetery, Cambridge, Massachusetts.

== See also ==
- List of American Civil War generals (Union)
- List of Massachusetts generals in the American Civil War
- Massachusetts in the American Civil War
