= Londonderry (CDP), Vermont =

Census-designated place in Vermont, United States

Londonderry, Vermont
- Census-designated place
- Location within Vermont Location within the United States
- Coordinates: 43°13′40″N 72°48′30″W
- Country: United States
- State: Vermont
- County: Windham
- Town: Londonderry

Area
  - Total: 0.37 sq mi (0.97 km^{2})
  - Land: 0.36 sq mi (0.92 km^{2})
  - Water: 0.019 sq mi (0.05 km^{2})
- Elevation: 1,178 ft (359 m)

Population (2020)
  - Total: 180
- Time zone: UTC-5 (Eastern (EST))
  - Summer (DST): UTC-4 (EDT)
- ZIP Code: 05148
- Area code: 802
- FIPS code: 50-40150
- GNIS feature ID: 2807163

Londonderry is an unincorporated village and census-designated place (CDP) in the town of Londonderry, Windham County, Vermont, United States. As of the 2020 census, it had a population of 180, compared to 1,919 in the entire town.

The CDP is in northwestern Windham County, in the northern part of the town of Londonderry. It sits in the valley of the West River, where it is joined from the north by Utley Brook. The West River is a south-flowing tributary of the Connecticut River.

Vermont Routes 11 and 100 combine to form the village's Main Street. Route 11 leads east 14 miles (23 km) to Chester and west over the Green Mountains 15 miles (24 km) to Manchester Center, while Route 100 leads north 15 miles (24 km) to Ludlow and south 12 miles (19 km) to Jamaica.
