= James Otis Follett =

James Otis Follett (May 12, 1842 – February 23, 1911) was a farmer, stonemason, and builder of bridges from Townshend, Vermont. He has been described as "an intuitive engineer, a farmer and mason."

He was born in May 1842 in Jamaica, Vermont. He was educated at Yale University, and served in Company D of the 16th Vermont Volunteers during the American Civil War, reaching the rank of corporal.

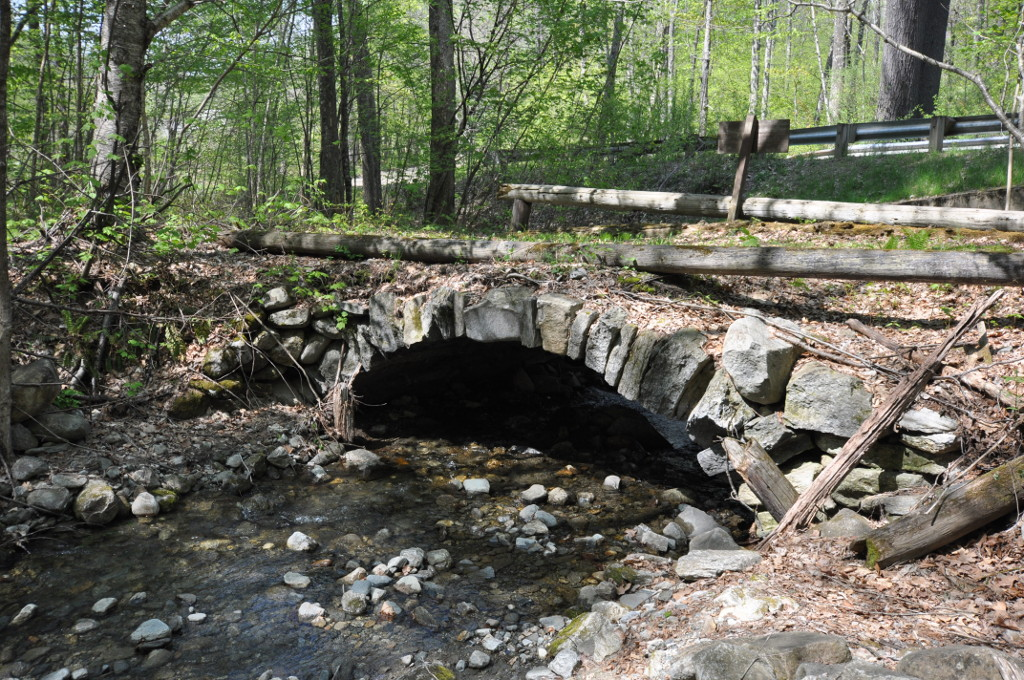
Huzzy Brook Stone Arch Bridge, one of four by Follett in Follett Stone Arch Bridge Historic District, in 2016

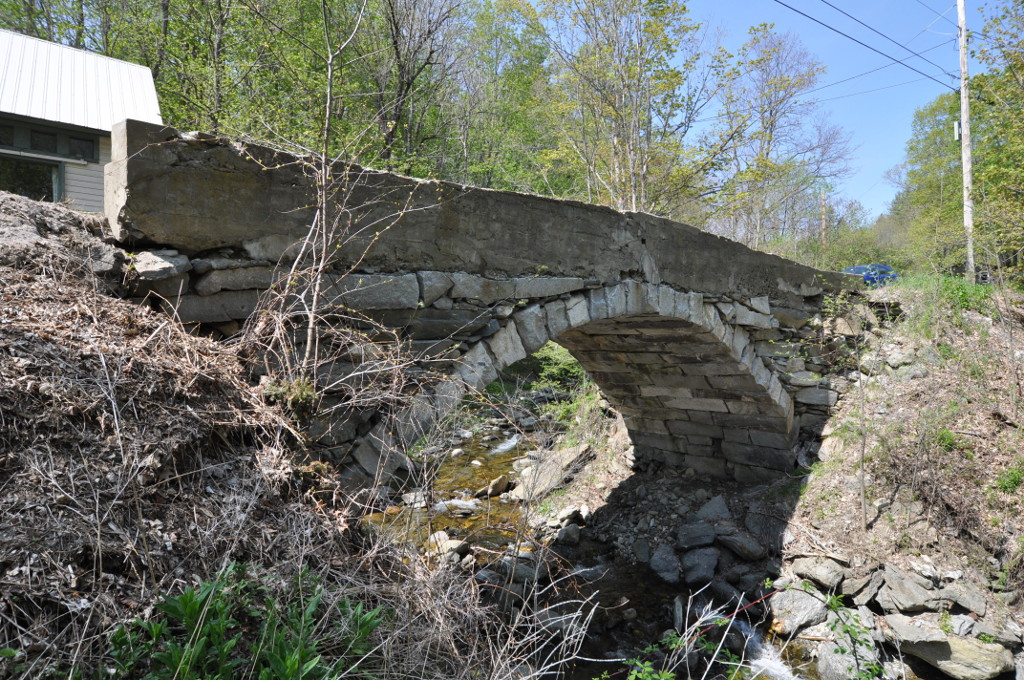
West Townshend Stone Arch Bridge, in 2016

During the 1890s and 1900s, Follett built as many as 40 bridges and culverts; 11 are known to survive. An account of Follett's work in the Bennington Banner in 1977 called his bridges "engineering marvels and parts of the scenic landscape of the region" and noted:

"Follett excelled in hand-crafted stone masonry – now practically a lost art. The bridges have no arch supports and contain little or no mortar. They are held together by the critical placement of a 'keystone', plus the force of the weight of the materials above the arch."

Follett was married to Clara E. Kimball in 1864 and died in February 1911 in Townshend, Vermont, as the result of acute dilation of the heart.

A number of his works are listed on the U.S. National Register of Historic Places.

In 2005, he was the subject of a theater program the Hooker-Dunham Theater in Brattleboro, Vermont, titled, "Vaulting Achievement - The Remarkable Life of James Otis Follett: Soldier, Farmer and Bridge Builder," by Dan Snow.

Works include:

- Four bridges in Follett Stone Arch Bridge Historic District (1894-1910), W of Townshend off VT 30, Townshend, Vermont, NRHP-listed
- East Putney Brook Stone Arch Bridge (1902), spans East Putney Brook off River Rd., East Putney, Vermont, NRHP-listed
- Sacketts Brook Stone Arch Bridge (1906), off U.S. 5 on Mill Rd., Putney, Vermont, NRHP-listed
- Simpsonville Stone Arch Bridge (1909), N of Townshend on VT 35, Townshend, Vermont, NRHP-listed
- West Townshend Stone Arch Bridge (c. 1910), spans Tannery Brook, West Townshend, Vermont, NRHP-listed
