= Dummerston, Vermont =

- Town
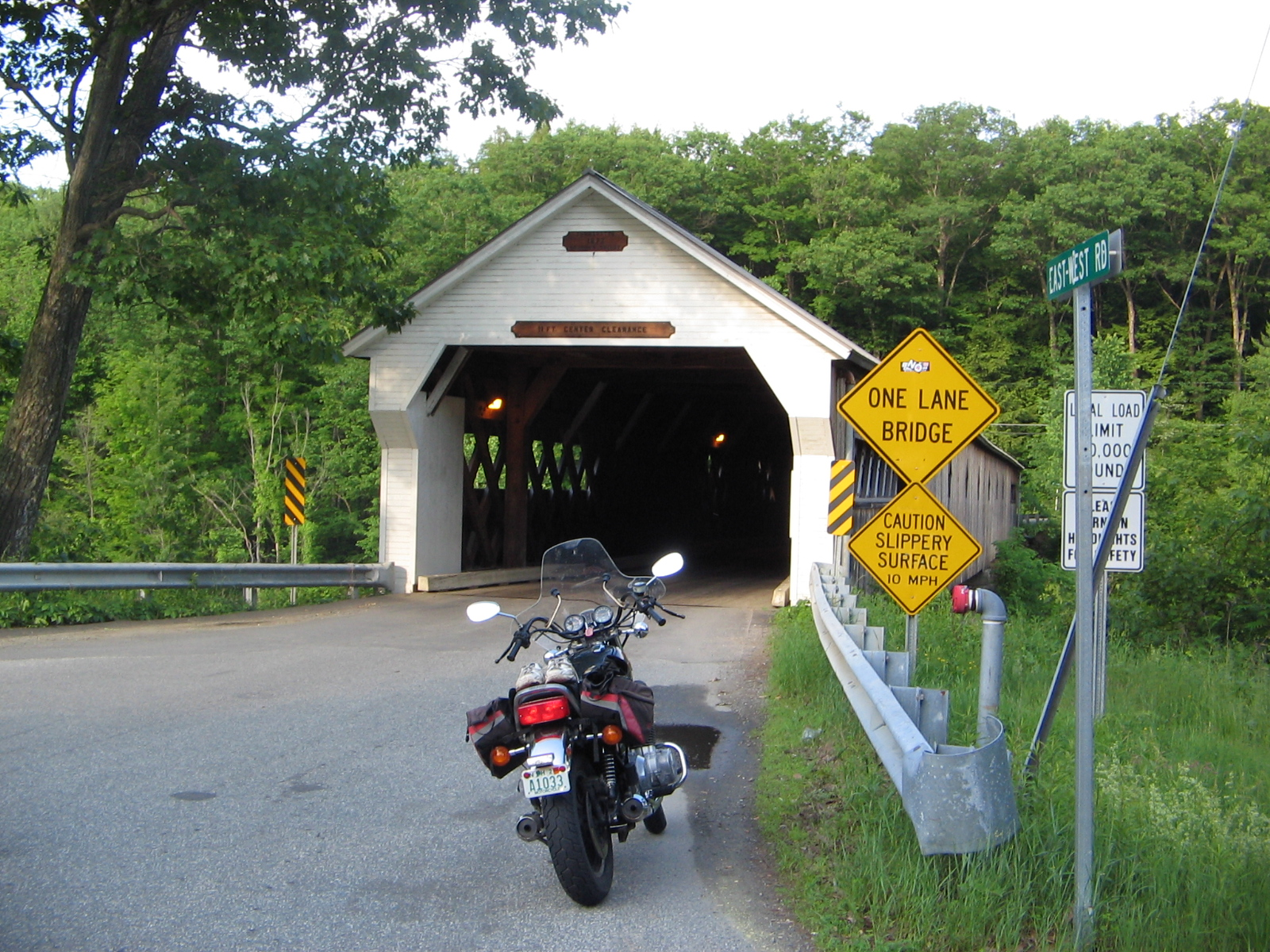
- West Dummerston Covered Bridge

- Seal

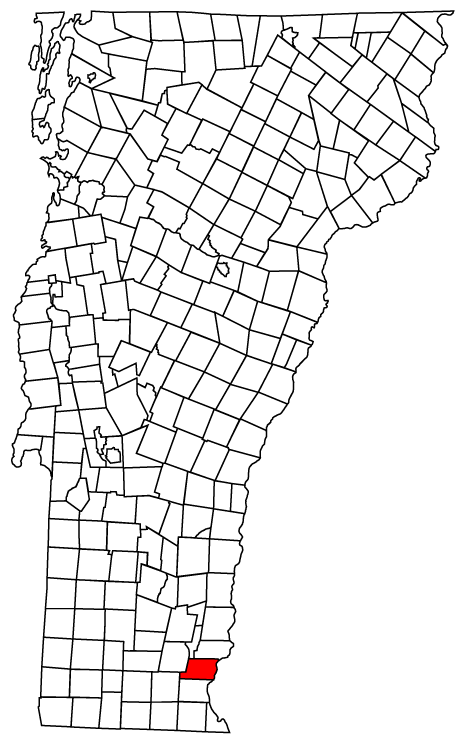
- Dummerston, Vermont
- Coordinates: 42°55′37″N 72°36′50″W
- Country: United States
- State: Vermont
- County: Windham
- Chartered: 1753
- Communities: Dummerston Center; East Dummerston; West Dummerston

Area
  - Total: 30.8 sq mi (79.8 km^{2})
  - Land: 30.6 sq mi (79.2 km^{2})
  - Water: 0.23 sq mi (0.6 km^{2})
- Elevation: 722 ft (220 m)

Population (2020)
  - Total: 1,865
  - Density: 61/sq mi (23.5/km^{2})
- Time zone: UTC-5 (Eastern (EST))
  - Summer (DST): UTC-4 (EDT)
- ZIP Codes: 05301 (Dummerston); 05346 (East Dummerston); 05357 (West Dummerston)
- Area code: 802
- FIPS code: 50-18325
- GNIS feature ID: 1462084
- Website: dummerston.org

Dummerston is a town in Windham County, Vermont, United States. The population was 1,865 at the 2020 census. It is home to the longest covered bridge still in use in Vermont. Its borders include three main villages: Dummerston Center, West Dummerston, and East Dummerston.

== History ==
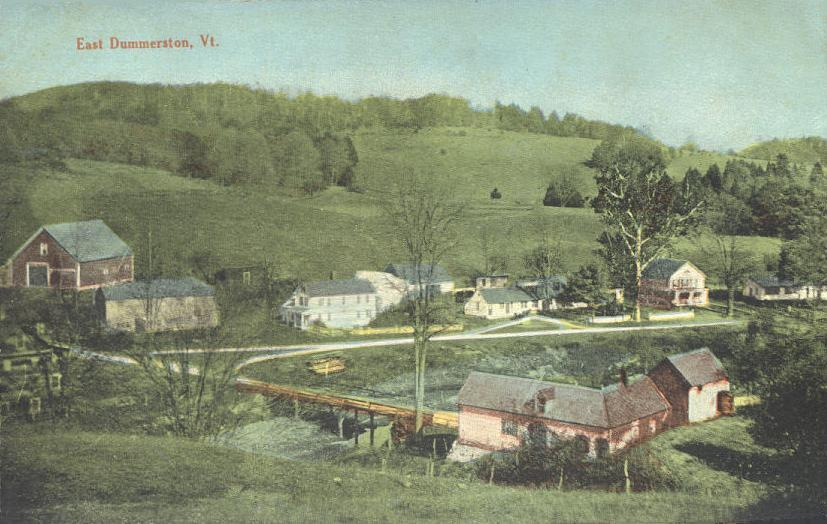
East Dummerston in 1913

Dummerston was part of the Equivalent Lands—several large sections of land given to settlers in the early eighteenth century. It lies on a tract given to the Connecticut Colony about 1715 by the Province of Massachusetts Bay as compensation for land mistakenly awarded by the latter to its settlers. In 1716, the town was auctioned to a consortium (which included William Dummer, lieutenant governor of Massachusetts), and named Dummerston. On December 26, 1753, the town was chartered as a New Hampshire grant and renamed Fulham by Governor Benning Wentworth. But when the grant was renegotiated, it reverted to Dummerston.

The many brooks and streams flowing into the West River provided the area with water power. Dummerston had five gristmills, five sawmills, one slate manufacturer, and one shop for making rakes. Raising sheep across the many hills was an important occupation. By 1859, the town had a population of 1,645. The Vermont Valley Railroad passed through Dummerston.

A house built in Dummerston in 1892, Naulakha, was home to author Rudyard Kipling. This is where he wrote several of his novels, including The Jungle Books and Captains Courageous.

There was a covered bridge that was built in 1812, and it moved to Old Sturbridge Village in 1946.

== Geography ==
According to the United States Census Bureau, the town has a total area of 30.8 square miles (79.8 km^{2}), of which 30.6 square miles (79.2 km^{2}) is land and 0.2 square mile (0.6 km^{2}) (0.71%) is water. Dummerston is bounded by the Connecticut River, and the West River flows through the town.

The town is crossed by Interstate 91 (Exit 4 serves the town and the exit sits on the border of Dummerston and Putney), U.S. Route 5 and Vermont Route 30. It is bordered by Brattleboro to the south, Marlboro and Newfane to the west, with Putney and Brookline to the north. Chesterfield, New Hampshire lies across the Connecticut River from it.

== Demographics ==
Historical population
Census	Pop.	Note	%±
1790	1,501		—
1800	1,692		12.7%
1810	1,704		0.7%
1820	1,658		−2.7%
1830	1,592		−4.0%
1840	1,263		−20.7%
1850	1,645		30.2%
1860	1,021		−37.9%
1870	916		−10.3%
1880	816		−10.9%
1890	860		5.4%
1900	726		−15.6%
1910	643		−11.4%
1920	570		−11.4%
1930	604		6.0%
1940	615		1.8%
1950	790		28.5%
1960	872		10.4%
1970	1,295		48.5%
1980	1,574		21.5%
1990	1,863		18.4%
2000	1,915		2.8%
2010	1,864		−2.7%
2020	1,865		0.1%
U.S. Decennial Census

As of the census of 2000, there were 1,915 people, 796 households, and 543 families residing in the town. The population density was 62.6 people per square mile (24.2/km^{2}). There were 893 housing units at an average density of 29.2 per square mile (11.3/km^{2}). The racial makeup of the town was 98.33% White, 0.05% African American, 0.63% Asian, 0.05% from other races, and 0.94% from two or more races. Hispanic or Latino of any race were 0.57% of the population.

There were 796 households, out of which 31.8% had children under the age of 18 living with them, 58.0% were married couples living together, 6.8% had a female householder with no husband present, and 31.7% were non-families. Of all households 25.4% were made up of individuals, and 6.9% had someone living alone who was 65 years of age or older. The average household size was 2.41 and the average family size was 2.89.

In the town, the population was spread out, with 23.1% under the age of 18, 5.1% from 18 to 24, 26.8% from 25 to 44, 31.1% from 45 to 64, and 13.9% who were 65 years of age or older. The median age was 42 years. For every 100 females, there were 101.2 males. For every 100 females age 18 and over, there were 97.1 males.

The median income for a household in the town was $46,121, and the median income for a family was $53,375. Males had a median income of $35,664 versus $26,174 for females. The per capita income for the town was $23,742. About 1.1% of families and 2.4% of the population were below the poverty line, including 2.7% of those under age 18 and 6.5% of those age 65 or over.

== Politics and government ==
Dummerston, like many New England counties and localities, uses a board of selectmen as its executive body and Town Meeting for legislative functions. In 2014, it had five selectmen forming up its selectboard. One of its most famous selectmen was Motel 6 spokesmodel and author Tom Bodett, who served on the selectboard as of 2013.

The Town of Dummerston also supports various municipal services including the West Dummerston Volunteer Fire Department, a highway department and a municipal library, the Lydia Taft Pratt Library. The West Dummerston Fire Department provides primary firefighting and first-response emergency medical services to the town and mutual aid to surrounding communities. The town’s highway department, headed by a Highway Foreman, is responsible for the maintenance of town roads and related infrastructure. The Lydia Taft Pratt Library, established in 1914 by a donation from Lydia Taft Pratt, who was a former citizen and teacher in Dummerston. After a vote of the residents, it became the town’s public library, located in West Dummerston and governed by a Board of Trustees.

== Sites of interest ==
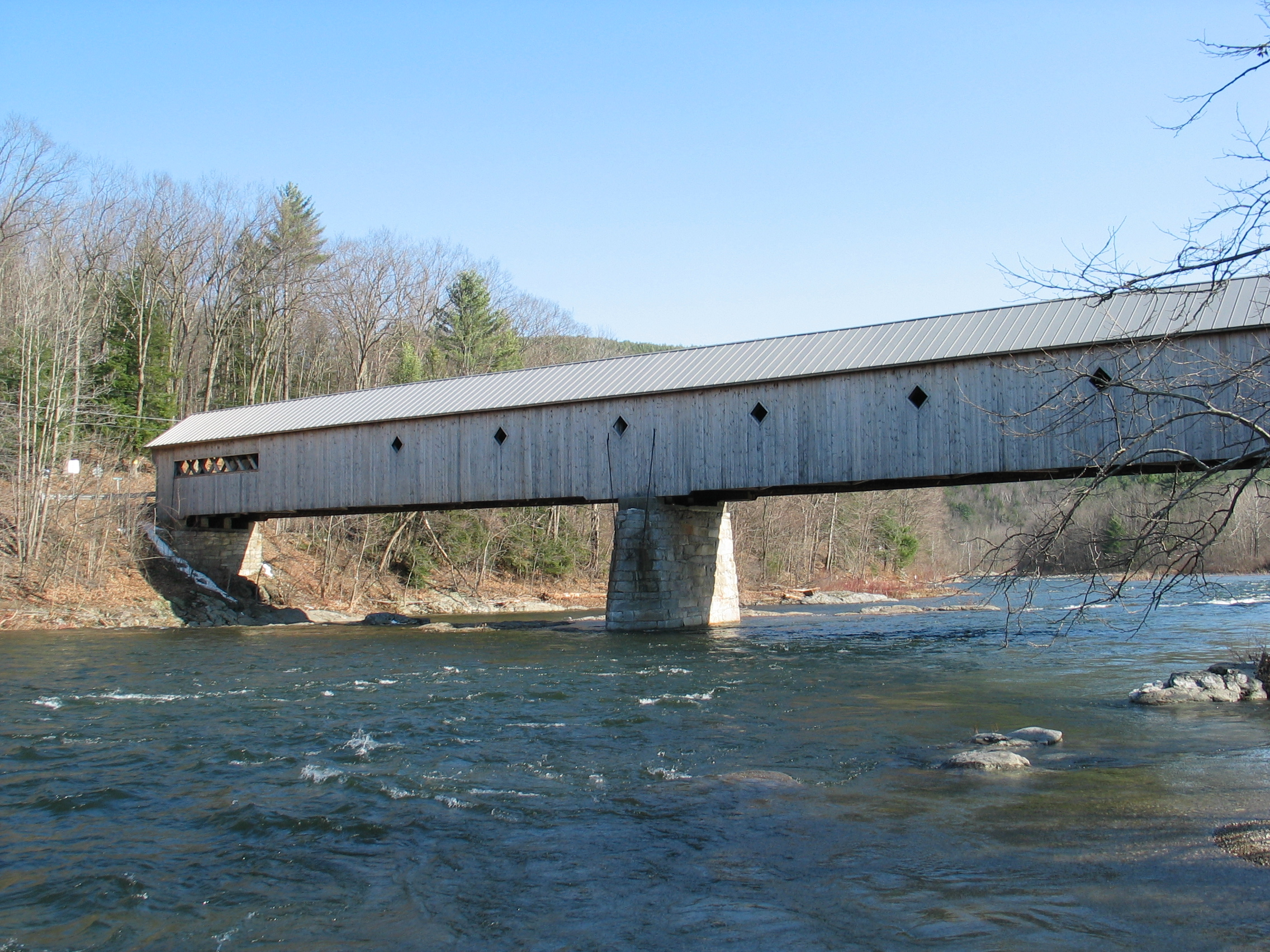
Built in 1872, the West Dummerston Covered Bridge has a floor length of 267 feet (81 m)

Dummerston has several interesting sites within its borders.

The longest covered bridge that is still in use in the state of Vermont is the West Dummerston Covered Bridge. Built in two spans which rest on a central pier, the bridge boasts a combined length of 267 feet along the floor. The gable ends overhang the floor at each end of the bridge by two feet; therefore, along the top of the trusses, the bridge is 271 feet long.

Dummerston is home to the 1,009 acre Black Mountain Conservation Area. Black Mountain rises abruptly from the West River into a horseshoe-shaped ridge. The mountain has a summit of 1,280 feet.

Author Rudyard Kipling made Dummerston home, building a house that he named Naulakha. It was there that he wrote his famous story, The Jungle Book, and invented the sport of Snow Golf. Naulakha is now a museum available for overnight stays. The house is a National Historic Landmark.

The Dummerston Grange periodically hosts the Vermont Theatre Company.

== Notable people ==
- George Aiken, U.S. senator and 64th governor of Vermont
- Tom Bodett, author and spokesman
- Peter Diamondstone, lawyer and politician
- Robert J. Flaherty, filmmaker and producer, husband of Frances H. Flaherty
- Frances H. Flaherty, Academy Award-nominated screenwriter
- Rudyard Kipling, English author
- Ronald Read, American philanthropist and investor
- Charles Sweetser, U.S. congressman
