= Norman F. Bates =

American soldier (1839–1915)

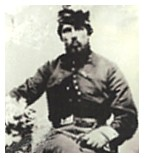
- Born: November 6, 1839; Londonderry, Vermont, U.S.
- Died: October 16, 1915 (aged 75)
- Burial place: Forest Lawn Memorial Park, Glendale, Glendale, California
- Military career
- Allegiance: United States of America
- Branch: United States Army; Union Army
- Service years: 1861 - 1865
- Rank: Sergeant
- Unit: 4th Regiment Iowa Volunteer Cavalry - Company E
- Conflicts: American Civil War
- Awards: Medal of Honor

Norman Francis Bates (November 6, 1839 - October 16, 1915) was an American soldier who received the Medal of Honor for valor during the American Civil War.

== Biography ==
Bates served in the American Civil War in the 4th Iowa Cavalry for the Union Army. He received the Medal of Honor on June 17, 1865 for his actions at Columbus, Georgia.

== Medal of Honor citation ==
Citation:

Capture of flag and bearer

== See also ==
- List of American Civil War Medal of Honor recipients: A–F
