= Increase Sumner Lincoln =

American politician (1799–1890)

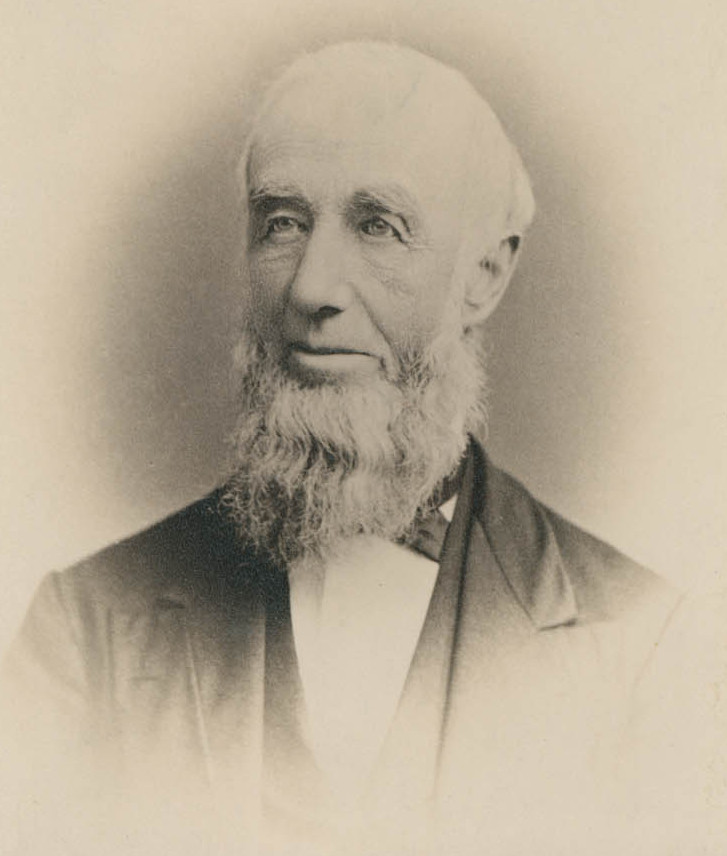
Increase Sumner Lincoln

Increase Sumner Lincoln (June 20, 1799 – August 2, 1890) was an American minister.

Lincoln, the youngest child of Seth and Jemima (Miller) Lincoln, was born in Western, now Warren, Massachusetts, on June 20, 1799.

He studied theology at Yale College and graduated in 1822. On June 16, 1824, he was ordained pastor of the Congregational church in Gardner, Massachusetts, where he remained for eighteen years, until February 23, 1842. He then supplied the Congregational church in Whately, Massachusetts, for about a year, and was next for nearly four years pastor of the Congregational church in Jamaica, Vermont. His resignation of the latter pastorate was due to the conviction that his views were no longer in harmony with the orthodox beliefs; and in the same spring (1847) he accepted a call to the pastorate of two Unitarian parishes, in Kensington and Hampton Falls, New Hampshire. Here he remained for three years, and in 1851 he accepted a call to become the pastor of the Unitarian church in Rowe, Massachusetts, where he continued for eight years. In 1860 he was settled in Warwick, Massachusetts, where he enjoyed a successful pastorate of eight years; during this time he was twice (1863 and 1866) a member of the New Hampshire State Legislature. He next went as a supply to Winchester, New Hampshire, where, after about a year, he was attacked with paralysis in the face, and was obliged to give up preaching temporarily.

His health improving, he was installed in 1870 over the First Congregational (Unitarian) Church in Wilton, New Hampshire, which he served as pastor until his retirement in 1879 on the completion of his 80th year. He died in Wilton after a painful illness, of peritonitis, on August 2, 1890, in his 92nd year, being (it is believed) the oldest minister of his denomination in the country.

He married, on December 30, 1822, Gratia Eliza, daughter of Dr. Nathan Smith, professor in the Medical Institution of Yale College, who died about 24 years later, leaving ten children. He next married, in 1847, Abbie Harwood, daughter of James Comee, of Gardner, Massachusetts, who survived him, with one of her two children, and six by the former marriage. The eldest son was graduated at Dartmouth College in 1850, and became an eminent physician in Washington, D.C.
