= East Putney Brook Stone Arch Bridge =

- U.S. National Register of Historic Places
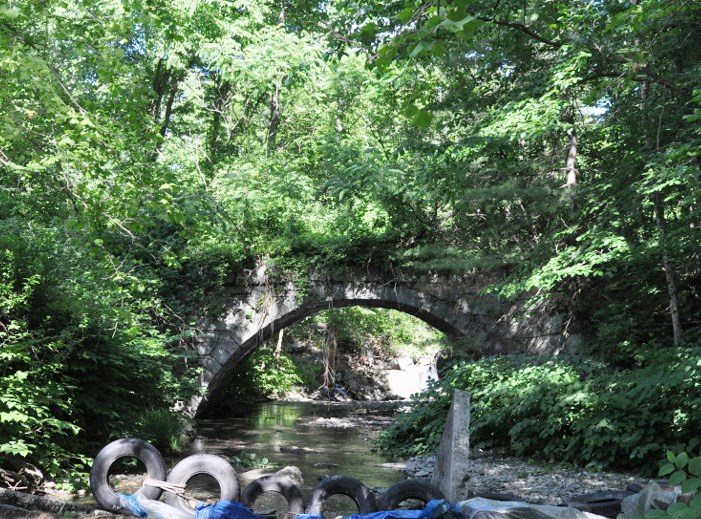

- Location within Vermont Location within the United States
- Location: Spans East Putney Brook off River Rd., East Putney, Vermont
- Coordinates: 42°59′9″N 72°28′9″W
- Area: less than one acre
- Built: 1902
- Built by: James Otis Follett
- Architectural style: Masonry arch
- NRHP reference No.: 76000149
- Added to NRHP: December 12, 1976

The East Putney Brook Stone Arch Bridge is a historic stone arch bridge in eastern Putney, Vermont. Built in 1902, it is a rare statewide example of a 20th-century stone bridge, and one of a number of such area bridges built by Townshend farmer and mason James Otis Follett. It was listed on the U.S. National Register of Historic Places in 1976. The bridge is located just west (upstream) of the present alignment of River Road, which it formerly carried.

== Description and history ==
The East Putney Brook Stone Arch Bridge is located in far eastern Putney, about 4 miles (6.4 km) northeast of Putney's village center. East Putney Brook flows from west to east, draining into the Connecticut River about 0.25 miles (0.40 km) east of the River Road crossing. The stone bridge stands a short way upstream of the current road alignment, having been bypassed about 1965. The modern road crosses the stream on a metal culvert whose profile resembles the old stone bridge, and a short way downstream the Boston and Maine Railroad crosses the stream on a 19th-century stone arch bridge.

The bridge is a single-span arch with a span of about 30 feet (9.1 m), rising 11 feet (3.4 m) above the typical water level of the stream. It has a roadbed about 16.5 feet (5.0 m) wide, sufficient for only a single modern travel lane. Stone wing walls flare out from all ends of the arch. The arch and other bridge elements are fashioned out of irregular granite blocks and slabs that have been mortared together in irregular courses. The arch spandrels are filled with granite blocks and rubble, with a gravel road surface laid on top.

The bridge was built in 1902 by Townshend resident James Otis Follett, and was the first of seven documented bridges and culverts built by Follett for the town of Putney. This bridge, and other surviving bridges built by Follett in Putney and Townshend, represent an unusual concentration of stone craftsmanship in an era when most bridges were being built out of iron and steel.

== See also ==
- National Register of Historic Places listings in Windham County, Vermont
- List of bridges on the National Register of Historic Places in Vermont
