= Londonderry, Vermont =

- Town
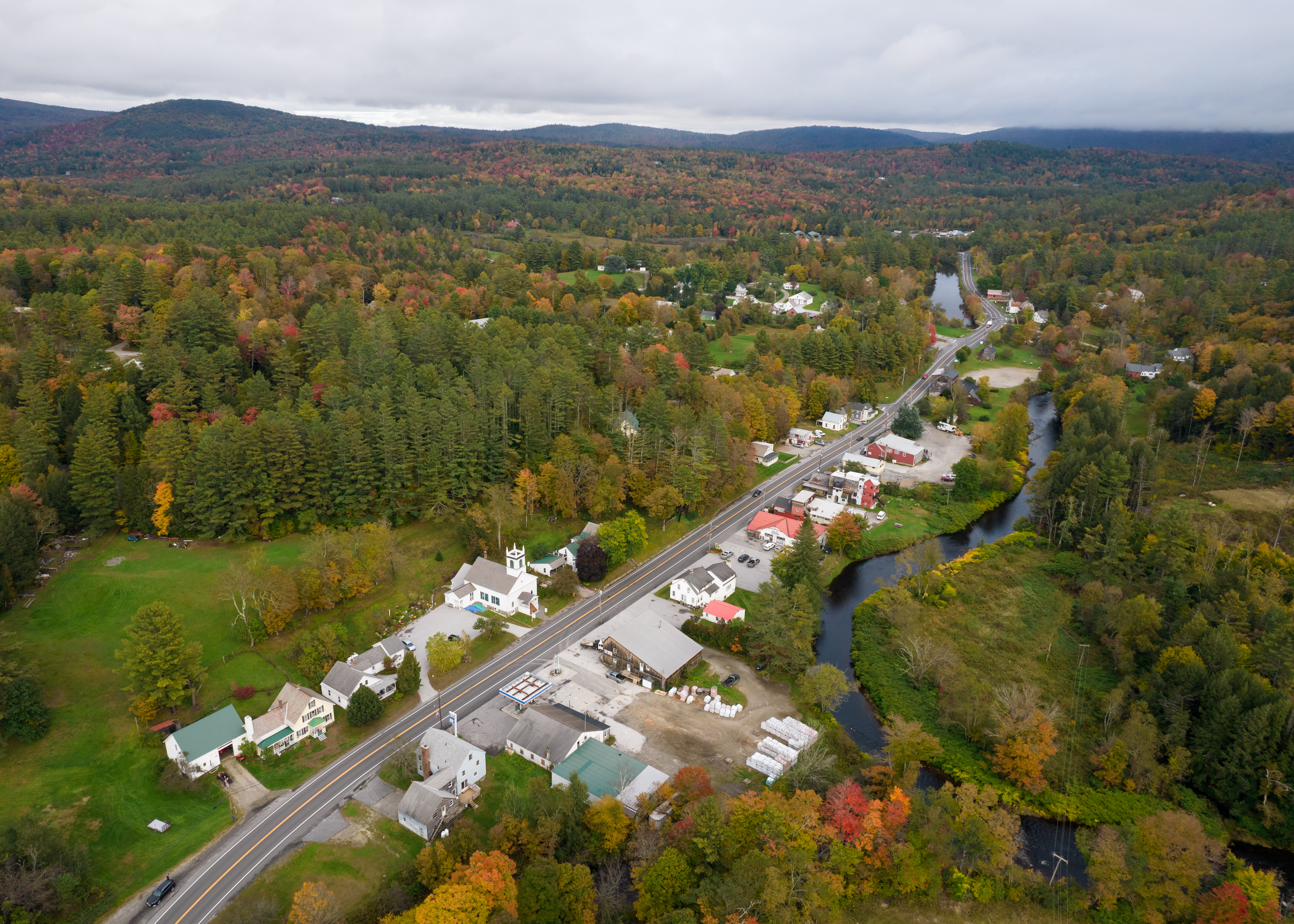

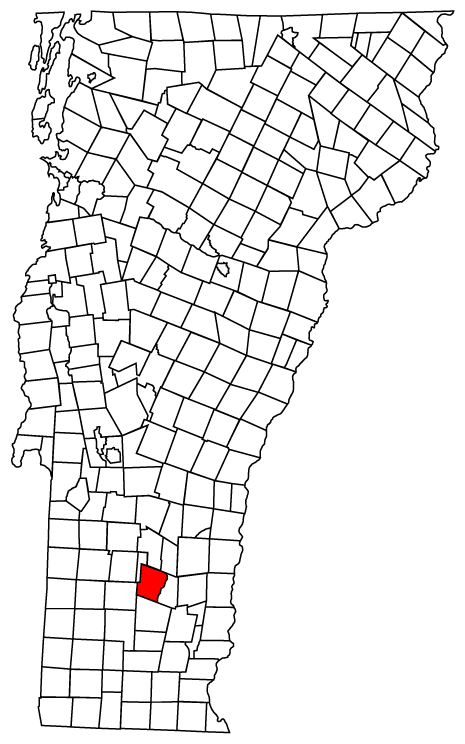
- Londonderry, Vermont
- Coordinates: 43°13′46″N 72°47′43″W
- Country: United States
- State: Vermont
- County: Windham
- Communities: Londonderry; South Londonderry; Thompsonburg

Area
  - Total: 35.9 sq mi (92.9 km^{2})
  - Land: 35.7 sq mi (92.4 km^{2})
  - Water: 0.19 sq mi (0.5 km^{2})
- Elevation: 1,171 ft (357 m)

Population (2020)
  - Total: 1,919
  - Density: 54/sq mi (20.8/km^{2})
- Time zone: UTC-5 (Eastern (EST))
  - Summer (DST): UTC-4 (EDT)
- ZIP Codes: 05148 (Londonderry); 05155 (South Londonderry)
- Area code: 802
- FIPS code: 50-40225
- GNIS feature ID: 1462136
- Website: https://www.londonderryvt.gov/

Londonderry is a town in Windham County, Vermont, United States. It is bounded on the north by Landgrove and Weston, on the east by Windham, on the south by Jamaica and on the west by Winhall and Landgrove. The population was 1,919 in the 2020 census. The town contains the villages of Londonderry and South Londonderry.

== History ==
Londonderry was first chartered in 1770 to a Col. James Rogers and was known as Kent, which included what is now Windham. The town was again chartered by act of the new Vermont Legislature on April 20, 1780. In this charter, the township was named Londonderry after Londonderry in New Hampshire, which in turn was named after Londonderry in Ireland.

== Geography ==
According to the United States Census Bureau, the town has a total area of 35.9 square miles (92.9 km^{2}), of which 35.7 square miles (92.4 km^{2}) is land and 0.2 square mile (0.5 km^{2}) (0.59%) is water. The West River flows through the town.

=== Climate ===
This climatic region is typified by large seasonal temperature differences, with warm to hot (and often humid) summers and cold (sometimes severely cold) winters. According to the Köppen Climate Classification system, Londonderry has a humid continental climate, abbreviated "Dfb" on climate maps.

== Demographics ==
Historical population
Census	Pop.	Note	%±
1790	362		—
1800	330		−8.8%
1810	637		93.0%
1820	958		50.4%
1830	1,302		35.9%
1840	1,216		−6.6%
1850	1,274		4.8%
1860	1,367		7.3%
1870	1,252		−8.4%
1880	1,154		−7.8%
1890	1,010		−12.5%
1900	961		−4.9%
1910	962		0.1%
1920	911		−5.3%
1930	799		−12.3%
1940	859		7.5%
1950	953		10.9%
1960	898		−5.8%
1970	1,037		15.5%
1980	1,510		45.6%
1990	1,506		−0.3%
2000	1,709		13.5%
2010	1,769		3.5%
2020	1,919		8.5%
U.S. Decennial Census

As of the census of 2000, there were 1,709 people, 730 households, and 470 families residing in the town. The population density was 47.9 people per square mile (18.5/km^{2}). There were 1,317 housing units at an average density of 36.9 per square mile (14.3/km^{2}). The racial makeup of the town was 98.60% White, 0.12% Black or African American, 0.23% American Indian or Alaska Native, 0.47% Asian, and 0.59% from two or more races. Hispanic or Latino of any race were 0.47% of the population.

There were 730 households, out of which 27.7% had children under the age of 18 living with them, 53.3% were married couples living together, 8.1% had a female householder with no husband present, and 35.5% were non-families. Households made up of individuals comprised 25.9% of the population, with 10.7% having someone 65 years of age or older living alone. The average household size was 2.34 and the average family size was 2.84.

In the town, the population's age was spread out, with 21.9% under the age of 18, 6.0% from 18 to 24, 28.7% from 25 to 44, 26.9% from 45 to 64, and 16.6% who were 65 years of age or older. The median age was 42 years. For every 100 females, there were 102.2 males. For every 100 females age 18 and over, there were 103.2 males.

The median income for a household in the town was $42,069, and the median income for a family was $48,000. Males had a median income of $29,871 versus $22,574 for females. The per capita income for the town was $24,220. About 2.7% of families and 6.3% of the population were below the poverty line, including 9.2% of those under age 18 and 6.7% of those age 65 or over.

== Attractions ==
- Magic Mountain Ski Area

== Notable people ==
- Norman F. Bates (1839–1915), Union Army soldier and holder of the Medal of Honor
- Jake Burton Carpenter (1954–2019), owner of Burton Snowboards
- Janette Hill Knox (1845–1920), temperance reformer, suffragist, teacher, author
- Ross Powers (born 1979), snowboarder; Olympic Gold Medalist
