= West River (Vermont) =

River in the U.S. state of Vermont

Coordinates: 43.3332185°N 72.7881521°W

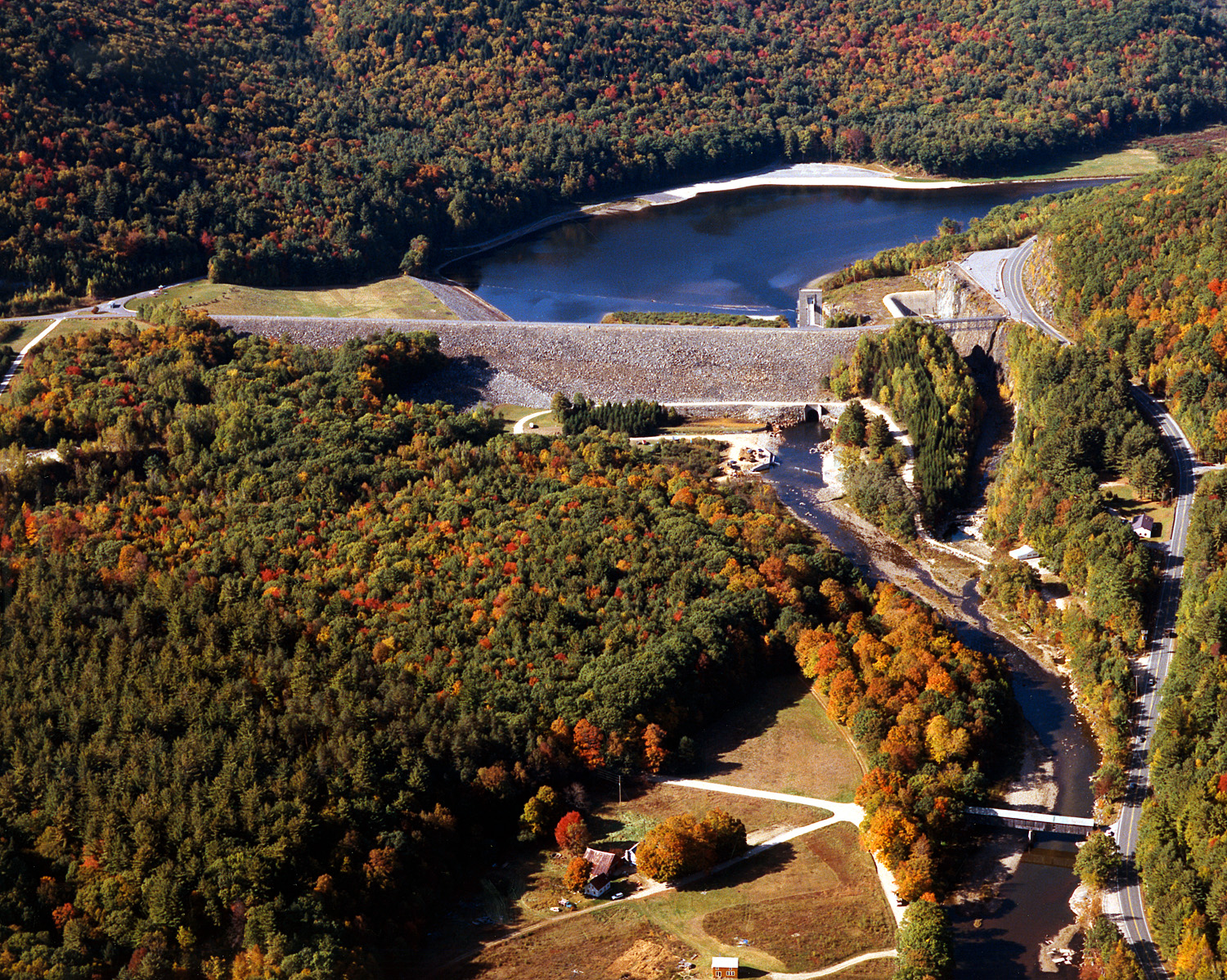
Townshend Lake and Dam on the West River in Windham County, Vermont

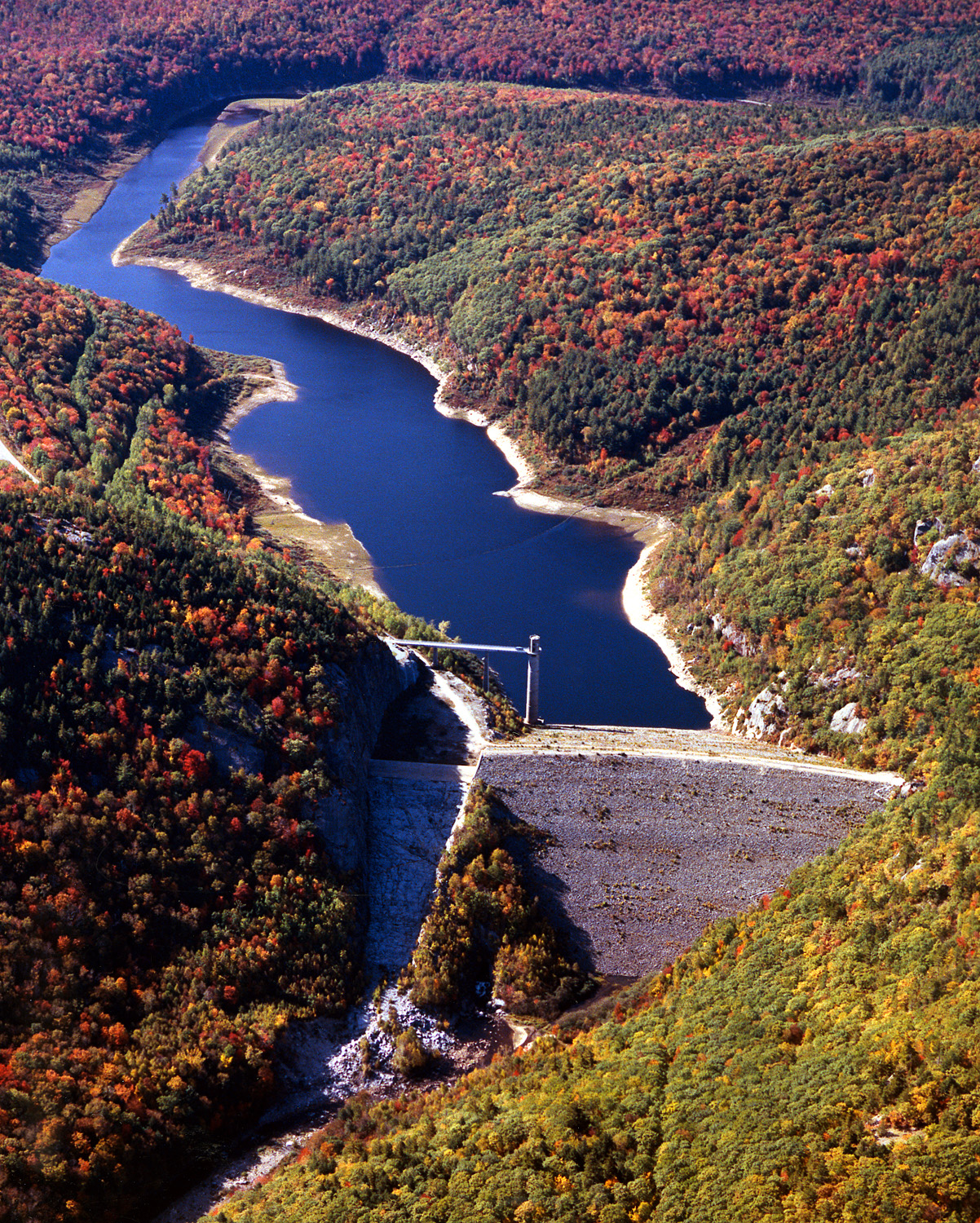
Ball Mountain Lake and Dam on the West River in Windham County, Vermont

The West River is a tributary of the Connecticut River, about 53.8 miles (86.6 km) long, in southern Vermont in the United States. According to the Geographic Names Information System, it has also been known historically as "Wantastiquet" and as "Waters of the Lonely Way". Its watershed covers 423 square miles (1,100 km^{2}); land use is about 90% forested and 3% agricultural, and the upper river supports wild native brook and wild brown trout.

The West River rises in the Green Mountains in the town of Mount Holly in southeastern Rutland County and flows southwardly through southwestern Windsor County into Windham County, where it turns southeastwardly. Along its course it flows through or along the boundaries of the towns of Weston, Londonderry, Jamaica, Townshend, Brookline, Newfane (where it collects the Rock River), and Dummerston to Brattleboro, where it flows into the Connecticut River.

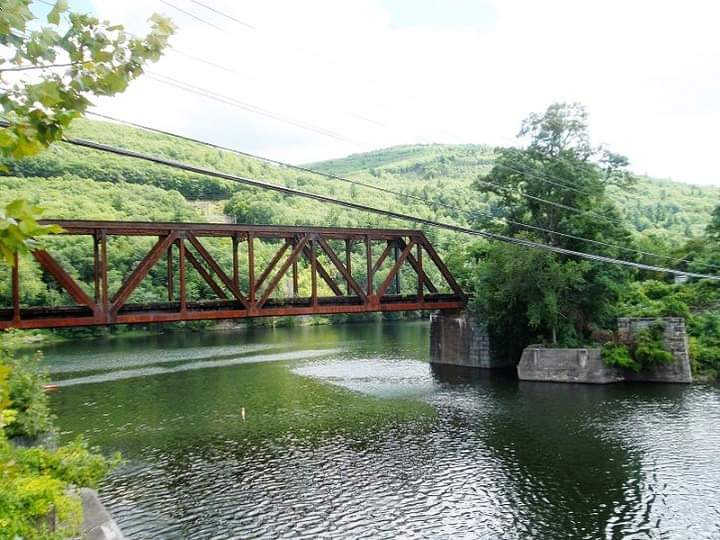
The Mouth of the West River in Brattleboro, as it was in August 2015.

U.S. Army Corps of Engineers dams on the West cause the river to form Ball Mountain Lake and Townshend Lake, both of which were built for the purpose of flood control in 1961. The river between Ball Mountain Lake and Townshend Lake is used for white water boating during releases from the Ball Mountain Dam (usually occurring during one weekend in April and one weekend in September).

== See also ==
- List of Vermont rivers
