= Whitney School =

Whitney School may refer to:

- Sir James Whitney School for the Deaf, Belleville, Ontario
- Eli Whitney Elementary School, Stratford, Connecticut
- Whitney School (Boise, Idaho), listed on the National Register of Historic Places (NRHP) in Ada County
- Whitney School (Green Bay, Wisconsin), NRHP-listed in Brown County
- May Whitney School, Lake Zurich, Illinois
- Cora B. Whitney School, Bennington, Vermont, NRHP-listed in Bennington County

== See also ==
- Whitney High School (disambiguation)
