= Holden–Leonard Workers Housing Historic District =

Historic district in Vermont, United States

- U.S. National Register of Historic Places
- U.S. Historic district
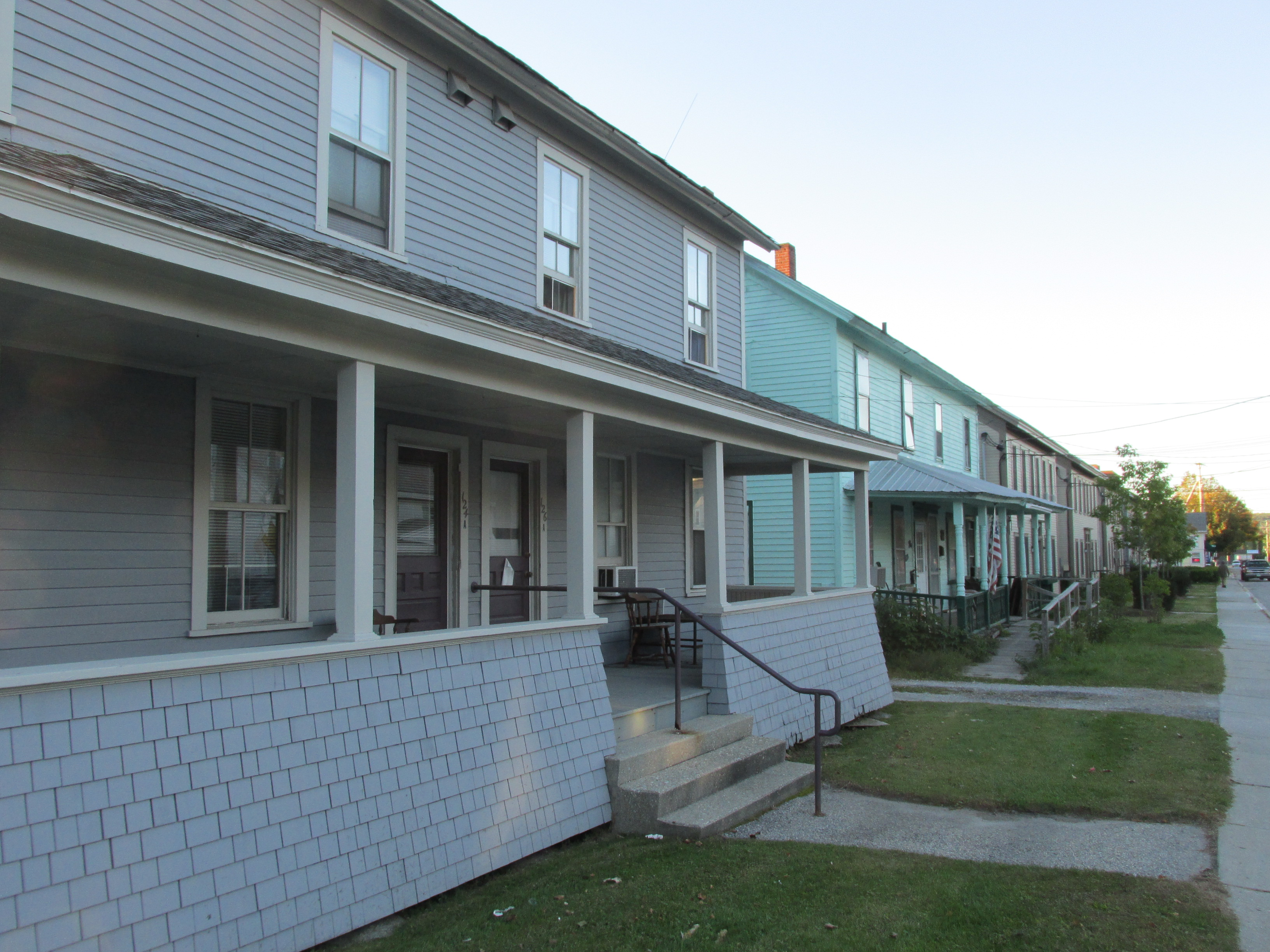
- 124-150 Benmont Avenue

- Location within Vermont Location within the United States
- Location: 121-139, 124-150 Benmont Ave. & 105-115, 117-123 Holden St., Bennington, Vermont
- Coordinates: 42°53′0″N 73°12′7″W
- Area: 4.5 acres (1.8 ha)
- Built: 1865
- NRHP reference No.: 11000296
- Added to NRHP: May 19, 2011

The Holden–Leonard Workers Housing Historic District encompasses a collection of mill-related tenement houses, plus a former mill store, in Bennington, Vermont. They are located on Benmont and Holden Avenues, near the former Holden–Leonard Mill Complex, Bennington's largest employer in the late 19th century. The district was listed on the National Register of Historic Places in 2011.

== Description and history ==
The Holden–Leonard Mill is located northwest of downtown Bennington, on the eastern bank of the Walloomsac River, bounded by Holden and Leonard Streets to the north and south, and Benmont Avenue to the east. Extending south from the mill on Benmont Avenue are a series of duplexes and tenement-style multiunit residential buildings. There are eleven buildings fronting on Benmont Avenue, and two that face Holden Street. All are 1-1/2 to three stories in height, and all but one are wood-frame structures with modest vernacular interpretations of architectural styles popular at the time of their construction. The one exception is the brick building at 121 Benmont Avenue, a brick structure originally built as the mill company store; it has exuberant Italianate styling reminiscent of that found on the main mill's buildings of the 1860s.

The complex now known as the Holden–Leonard Mill was established in 1865, with the construction of its central "Big Mill" by what was then called the Bennington Manufacturing Company. Between then and 1875, that company built most of the housing in this district to provide homes for some of its workers, as well as the company store, whose upper floors were eventually also converted into tenement-style living spaces. The two duplexes at 124-126 and 128-130 Benmont were both built about 1900, and were built to match in style the earlier housing on the street.

== See also ==
- National Register of Historic Places listings in Bennington County, Vermont
