= Downtown Bennington Historic District =

Historic district in Vermont, United States

- U.S. National Register of Historic Places
- U.S. Historic district
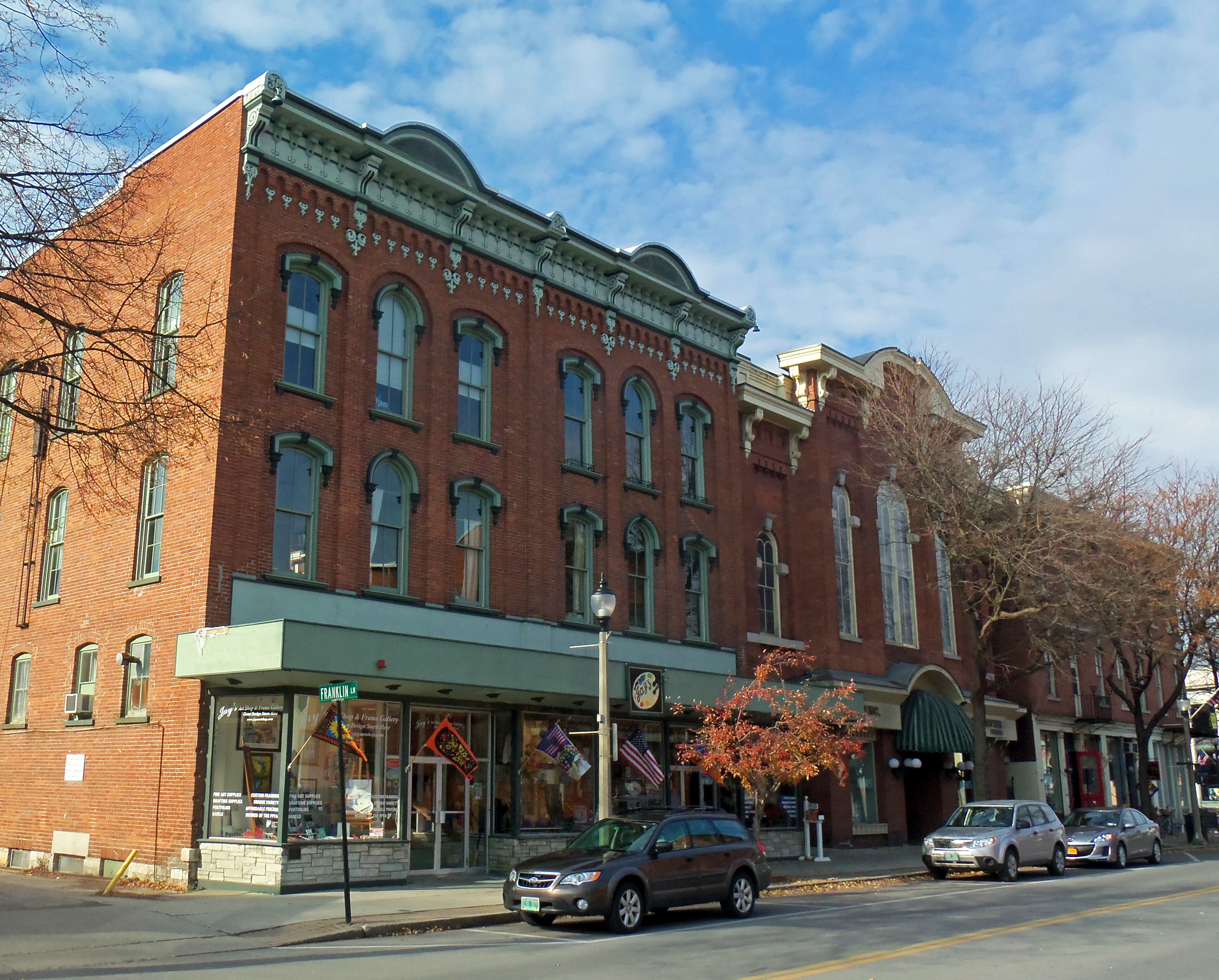

- Location within Vermont Location within the United States
- Location: U.S. 7 and VT 9, Bennington, Vermont
- Coordinates: 42°52′43″N 73°11′51″W
- Area: 13 acres (5.3 ha) (original)
- Built: 1852
- Architect: Taylor, James Knox; Hobbs and Sons
- Architectural style: Classical Revival, Italianate, Greek Revival
- NRHP reference No.: 80000327 (original); 08000454 (increase)

Significant dates
- Added to NRHP: April 1, 1980
- Boundary increase: May 21, 2008

The Downtown Bennington Historic District encompasses the historic commercial heart of Bennington, Vermont. Centered on the junction of Main, South, and North Streets, it exhibits a variety of commercial architectural styles from the early 19th to mid-20th century. It was listed on the National Register of Historic Places in 1980, and was enlarged in 2008.

== Description and history ==
Bennington's historic downtown extends along United States Route 7 (North and South Streets), from Elm Street in the south to the Walloomsac River in the north, and along Vermont Route 9, from a short way west of its junction with US 7 to Silver Street. It includes a broad diversity of commercial, civic, and cultural buildings, dating mainly from the second quarter of the 19th century to the early 20th century. Prominent civic buildings are the town hall (an 1846 Greek Revival building), the county courthouse (1936, Colonial Revival), and the Old Bennington Post Office (1914, Classical Revival, now the police station).

The town of Bennington is the largest town in southwestern Vermont, and is one of two shire towns of Bennington County. It has long been a civic and economic center of the region, and was the first town to receive an official charter in what is now the state of Vermont. That charter was issued in 1749 by Benning Wentworth, the colonial governor of New Hampshire, who sought to establish his province's claim to the area. The town's original center was on a nearby hill (at what is now called Old Bennington), and grew economically around a crossroads (now US 7 and VT 9). This area flourished in the 19th century because of the water power provided by the Walloomsac River to its industries, its rise in political importance cemented in the 1870s with the construction of a new courthouse. Bennington's industrial economic success continued in the 20th century, and the town retains an economically diversified economy.

== See also ==
- National Register of Historic Places listings in Bennington County, Vermont
