= Gov. Jonas Galusha Homestead =

Historic house in Vermont, United States

- U.S. National Register of Historic Places
- U.S. Historic district – Contributing property
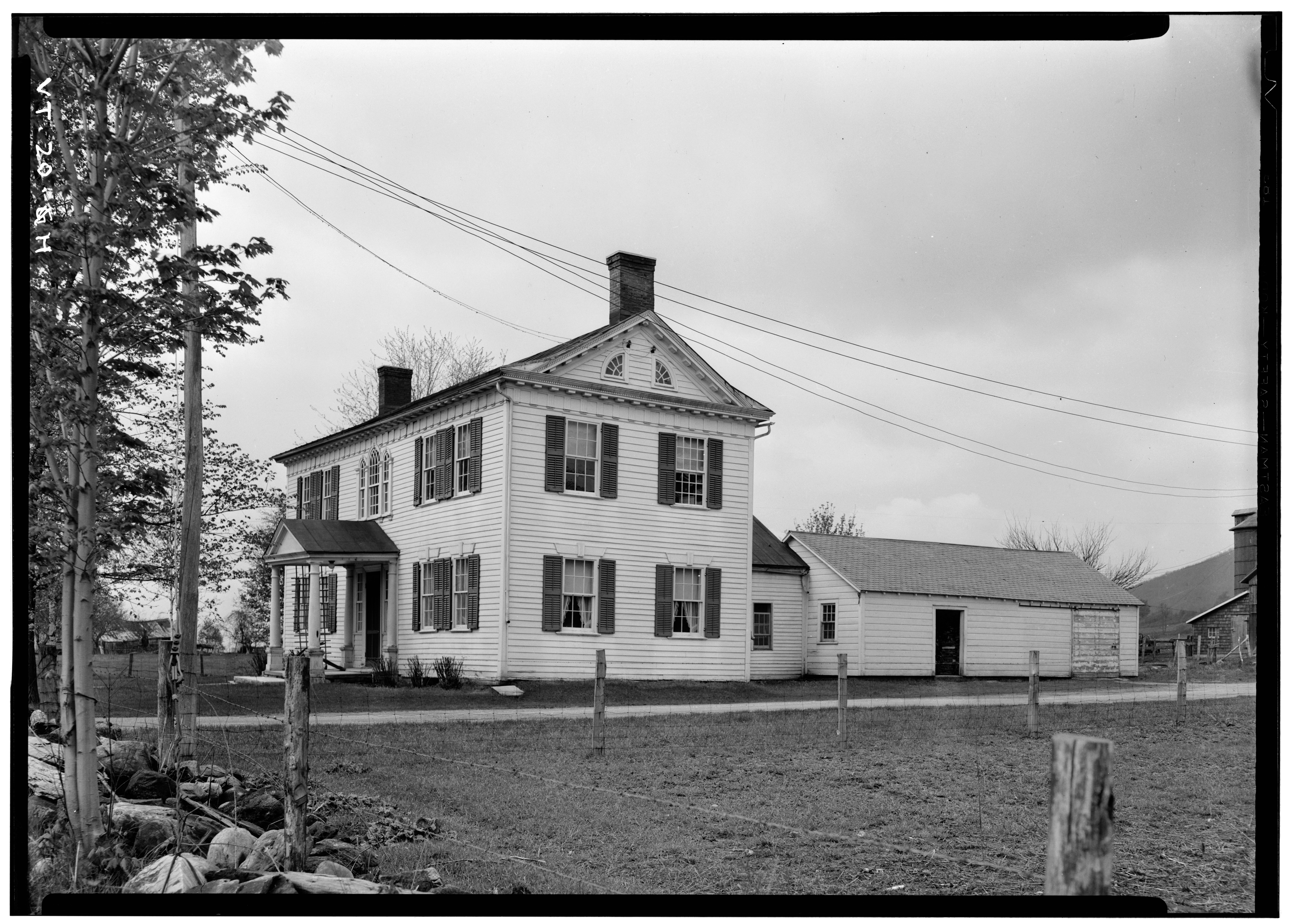
- HABS photo, c. 1937

- Location within Vermont Location within the United States
- Location: 3871 VT 7A, Shaftsbury Center, Vermont
- Coordinates: 42°59′17″N 73°12′24″W
- Area: 174 acres (70 ha)
- Built: 1783
- Built by: Lavius Fillmore
- Architectural style: Federal
- Part of: Center Shaftsbury Historic District (ID88002052)
- NRHP reference No.: 79000217

Significant dates
- Added to NRHP: November 30, 1979
- Designated CP: November 9, 1988

The Governor Jonas Galusha Homestead is a historic homestead at 3871 Vermont Route 7A in Shaftsbury Center, Vermont. Built in 1783 and enlarged in 1805, it is a well-preserved example of Federal period architecture. It was built by Jonas Galusha, Vermont's fifth governor and a leading politician and military figure of southern Vermont for many years. It is now home to the Shaftsbury Historical Society, and was listed on the National Register of Historic Places in 1979.

== Description and history ==
The Governor Joseph Galusha Homestead is located near the northern end of the dispersed rural village of Shaftsbury Center, which is strung along Vermont Route 7A, the former alignment of United States Route 7 and historically the major north–south route through the area. The homestead includes 174 acres (70 ha), much of which is either in agricultural use or wooded. Its building complex is located near the property's southeastern corner, on the west side of the road, at one of its highest points. The main house is a 2 1/2-story wood-frame I-house, with a side-gable roof, end chimneys, clapboard siding, and a marble block foundation. Extending to its rear are a 1 1/2-story ell. The main facade is five bays wide, with a central entry with marble floor sheltered by a gabled porch, and a Palladian window above. The interior retains original features from the early 19th century, including hand-forged hinges and latches made by the building's most prominent resident, Jonas Galusha.

The oldest portion of the house is the small rear ell, which was built by Galusha in 1783. The front part of the house was built in 1805, supposedly to a design suggested by local master builder Lavius Fillmore. The house was home to Galusha until his death in 1834. He was a major force in the politics and military of southwestern Vermont for many years, serving in American Revolutionary War at the Battle of Hubbardton and the Battle of Bennington. He was sheriff of Bennington County in the 1780s, and the fifth Governor of Vermont.

== See also ==
- National Register of Historic Places listings in Bennington County, Vermont
