= Munro-Hawkins House =

Historic house in Vermont, United States

- U.S. National Register of Historic Places
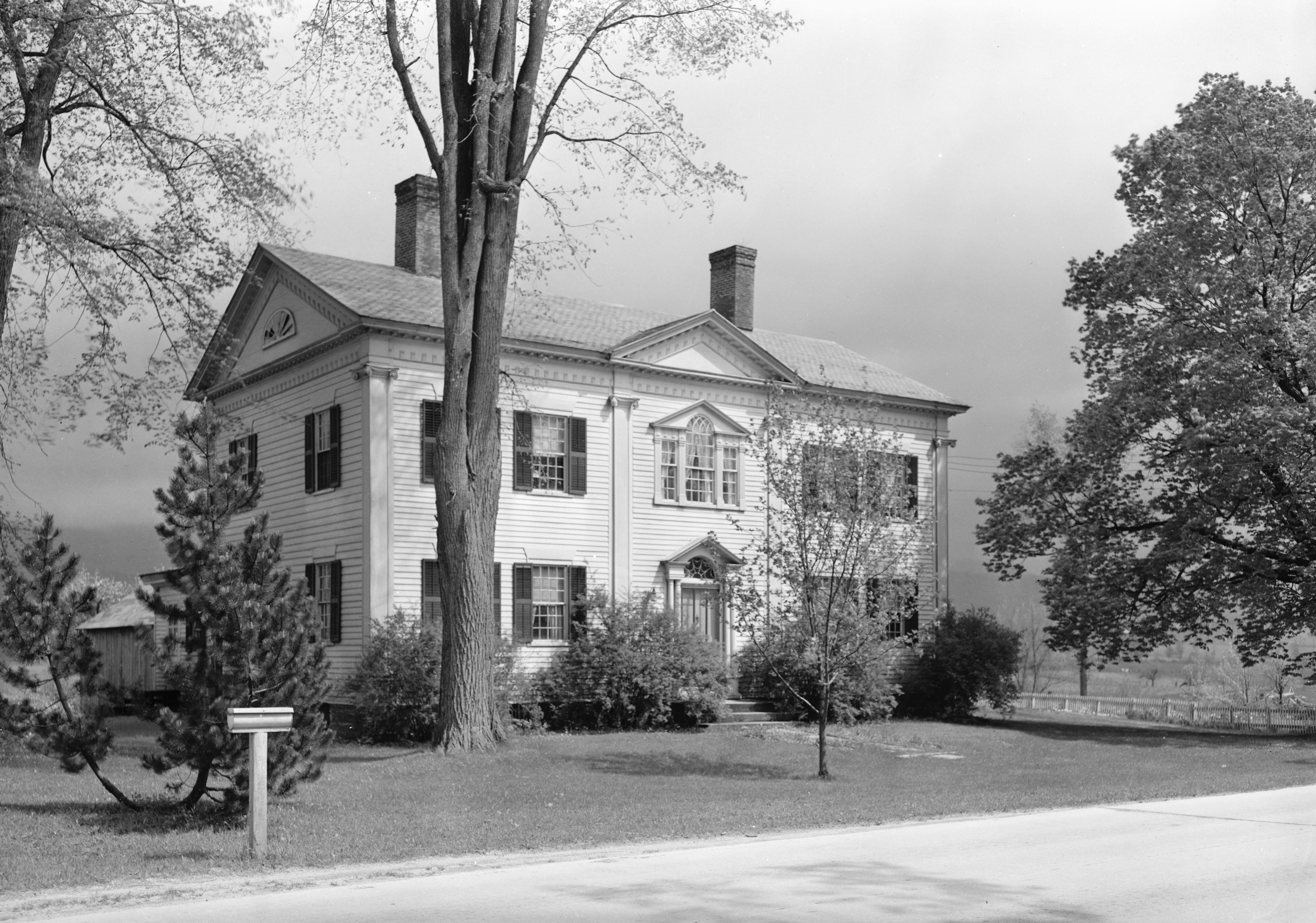
- 1930s HABS photo

- Location within Vermont Location within the United States
- Nearest city: VT 7A, Shaftsbury, Vermont
- Coordinates: 42°57′24″N 73°12′31″W
- Area: 4 acres (1.6 ha)
- Built: 1807
- Built by: Lavius Fillmore
- Architectural style: Georgian, Federal, Adamesque
- NRHP reference No.: 73000188
- Added to NRHP: May 17, 1973

The Munro-Hawkins House is a historic house on Vermont Route 7A in southern Shaftsbury, Vermont. Built in 1807, it is a well-preserved example of transitional Georgian-Federal period architecture, designed by local master builder Lavius Fillmore. It was listed on the National Register of Historic Places in 1973.

== Description and history ==
The Munro-Hawkins House is located in southern Shaftsbury, on the east side of Vermont 7A, north of its junction with Airport Road. It is a two-story wood-frame structure, five bays wide, with a side gable roof, clapboard siding, and two interior brick chimneys. A single-story gabled ell extends to the rear of the west-facing main block. Fluted Ionic pilasters articulate the building corners and flank the central front bay, supporting an entablature and modillioned cornice. The main entrance is flanked by slender Ionic columns, and is topped by a fanlight window that breaks a gabled pediment. Above the entry is a Palladian window, its windows separated by pilasters, with a gabled pediment. A small gable rises on the roof above. The gable ends at the sides of the house are fully pedimented, and have half-round windows at their centers. The interior, organized in a central hall plan, retains original marble fireplace surrounds and woodwork.

The house was built in 1807, and is attributed to Lavius Fillmore, a noted regional master builder. It was built for Joseph Munro (or Monroe), a wealthy farmer, and served as a farmhouse for many years. It represents a high-quality local example of transitional architecture between the Georgian and Federal styles.

== See also ==
- National Register of Historic Places listings in Bennington County, Vermont
