= E. J. Bullock Block =

- E.J. Bullock Block
- U.S. National Register of Historic Places
- Location within Vermont Location within the United States
- Location: 7012 Main St., Readsboro, Vermont
- Coordinates: 42°46′20″N 72°56′54″W
- Area: 0.12 acres (0.049 ha)
- Built: 1891
- NRHP reference No.: 100007005
- Added to NRHP: September 21, 2021

The E.J. Bullock Block is a historic commercial building at 7012 Main Street in Readsboro, Vermont. Built in 1891, it is a prominent local example of Second Empire architecture, with a long history of commercial, social, and civic uses. The building was listed on the National Register of Historic Places in 2021.

== Description and history ==
The E.J. Bullock Block is a three-story wood-frame building, located on the south side of Main Street (Vermont Route 100), on the western side of the village of Readsboro. Its distinctive Second Empire features include a pyramidal tower extending above the front central bay, and a dormered mansard roof. The main floor of the front facade has storefronts on either side of a recessed center entrance, all framed by paneled woodwork which is also probably original. The storefronts each have a recessed entry flanked by large four-pane fixed windows. The ground floor houses spaces originally used for retail commercial purposes, the second floor housed offices, and the third floor had an open plan used for social gatherings.

The block was built in 1891 by Elmer J. Bullock, operator of a local general store, during a period of economic growth in the small community which was spurred by the opening of a paper mill and the subsequent arrival of a railroad line. It was built after an arsonist destroyed his existing shop along with several adjacent buildings. At first known locally as the Music Hall, Bullock promoted use of the third floor as a performance space, drawing regional and national artists to the venue. The block continued to play an important role in the community after Bullock was bankrupted in the early 20th century, hosting all manner of community gatherings. In 1908 the hall was leased by the local Masonic chapter, a role it served until about 1968.

== See also ==
- National Register of Historic Places listings in Bennington County, Vermont
