= Old Bennington High School =

- Bennington High School
- U.S. National Register of Historic Places
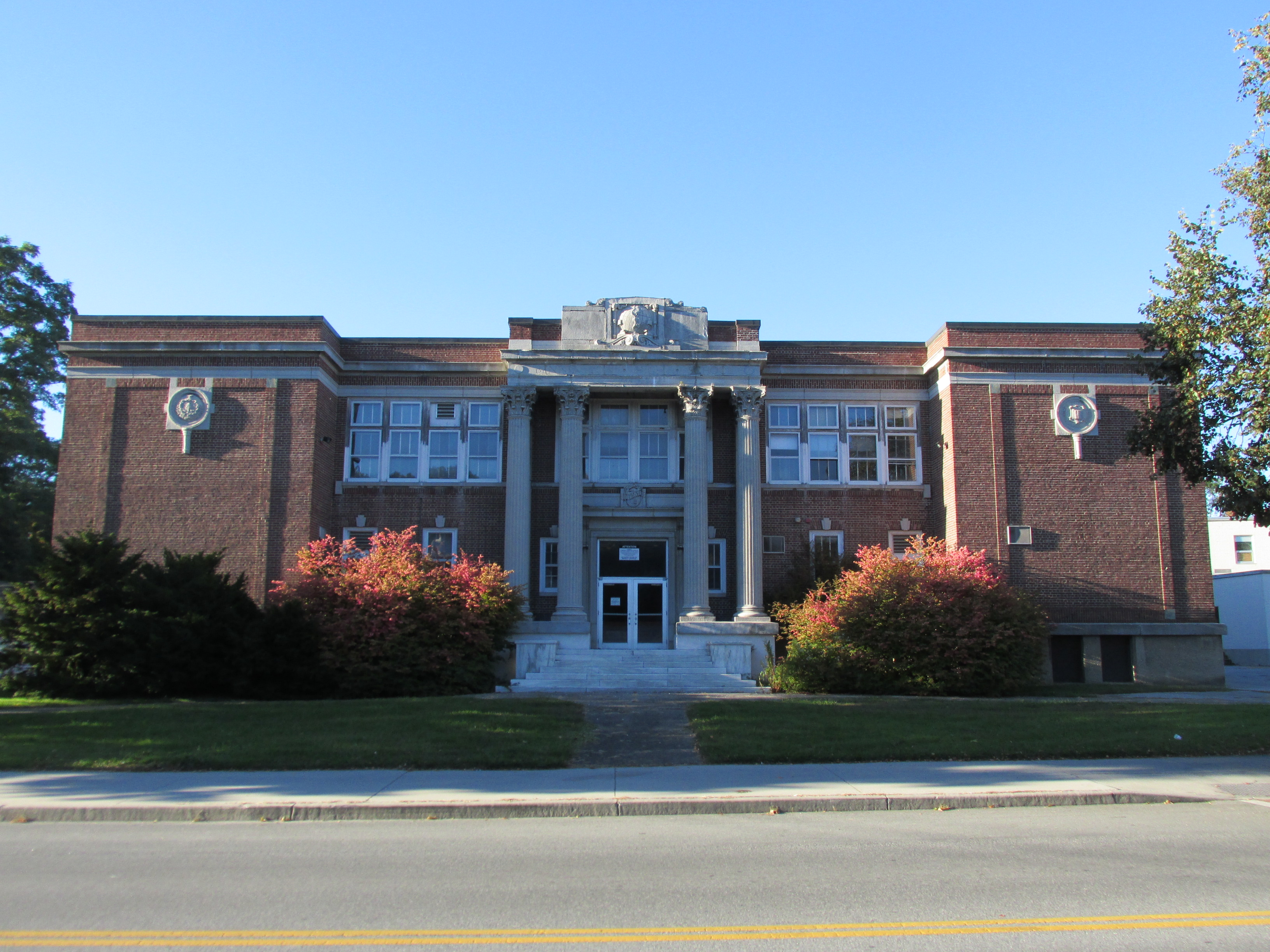

- Location within Vermont Location within the United States
- Location: 650 Main St., Bennington, Vermont
- Coordinates: 42°52′49″N 73°11′24″W
- Area: 2.3 acres (0.93 ha)
- Built: 1913
- Architect: Cooper and Bailey; Duff, John W.
- Architectural style: Beaux Arts
- NRHP reference No.: 05000948
- Added to NRHP: August 26, 2005

The Former Bennington High School is a historic school building at 650 Main Street in Bennington, Vermont. Built in 1913 and enlarged several times, it is architecturally significant as an excellent example of Beaux-Arts architecture, and is historically important for its role in local education. The building, closed in 2004, was listed on the National Register of Historic Places in 2005. Bennington's high school educational services are now provided by Mount Anthony Union High School.

== Description and history ==
The Old Bennington High School is located on the eastern edge of Bennington's downtown area, on the north side of Main Street (Vermont Route 9), on a lot that is bounded on the north side by Pleasant Street. It is a two-story masonry structure, built out of brick and stone, and set on a concrete foundation. The south-facing main facade is symmetrical, with a central section flanked by slightly projecting wings. The central portion houses the main entrance, which is sheltered by a two-story portico with fluted Corinthian columns supporting an entablature, a cornice, and parapet. It is flanked on the first floor by single sash windows with stone keystones, and on the second floor by bands of sash windows with transoms above. The front-facing wing ends have no windows, and a brick panel outline with marble corner blocks. Medallions are centered near the tops of these panels.

The town of Bennington's first high school was built about 1875, and was over its capacity by 1909. In 1912 the town authorized construction of this building, which was formally opened in 1914. It served as a high school until 1967, undergoing additions in 1939, 1958, and again in 1975, when it was serving as Mount Anthony Middle School. The middle school was closed in 2004, and plans were laid to convert the building to senior housing.

== See also ==
- National Register of Historic Places listings in Bennington County, Vermont
