= Frederick Squire House =

Historic house in Vermont, United States

- U.S. National Register of Historic Places
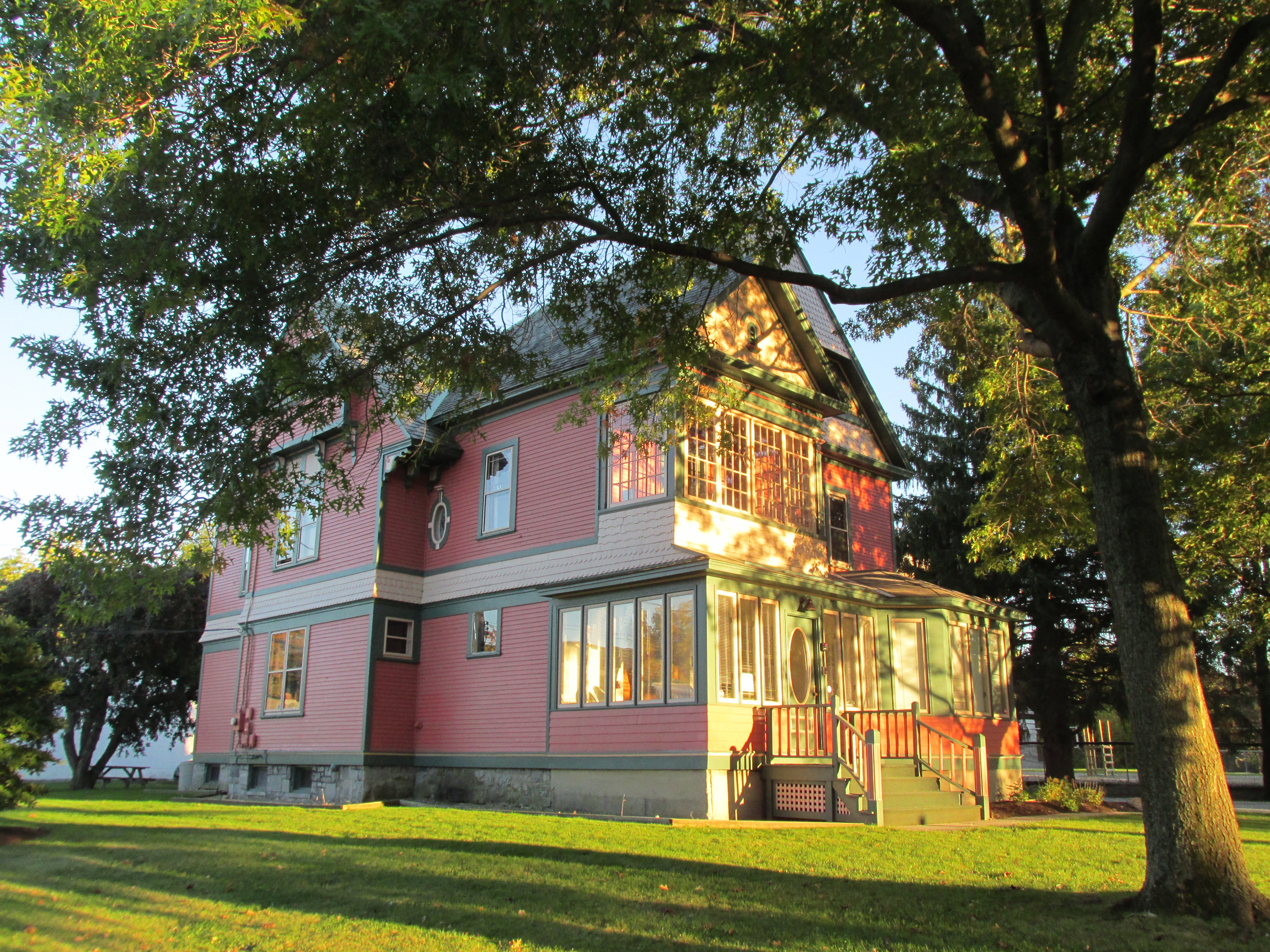

- Location within Vermont Location within the United States
- Location: 185 North St., Bennington, Vermont
- Coordinates: 42°53′3″N 73°11′40″W
- Area: 1 acre (0.40 ha)
- Built: 1887
- Architectural style: Queen Anne
- NRHP reference No.: 92000964
- Added to NRHP: July 30, 1992

The Frederick Squire House is a historic house at 185 North Street in Bennington, Vermont. Built about 1887, it is one of the town's finest examples of Queen Anne Victorian architecture. It was listed on the National Register of Historic Places in 1992.

== Description and history ==
The Squire House is located north of downtown Bennington, at the southeast corner of North Street (United States Route 7) and Gage Street. It is a 2 1/2-story wood-frame structure, with a cross-gabled roof, an exterior clad in clapboards and decoratively cut shingles, and a foundation of brick, stone, and concrete. It has a projecting front porch, now enclosed in glass, extending across the front, with a smaller second-story porch above. A band of cut shingles extends around the building between the first and second floors, with more such shingling in the gables above the second-floor windows. Small oval keystoned windows make decorative accents on the side facades. The interior retains original high-quality woodwork, including the staircase, builtin cabinetry, and spindlework transom screens on some of the windows. The dining room has a pressed metal ceiling.

The house was built about 1887 by Frederick Squire, a jeweler who was prominent in the local business community. The front porches and other Colonial Revival details were probably added by the house's second owner, who purchased it in 1904. For most of the 20th century it saw a variety of uses, including as a convent for an adjacent school, and as a real estate office.

== See also ==
- National Register of Historic Places listings in Bennington County, Vermont
