= Johnny Seesaw's =

- Johnny Seesaw's Historic District
- Formerly listed on the U.S. National Register of Historic Places
- U.S. Historic district
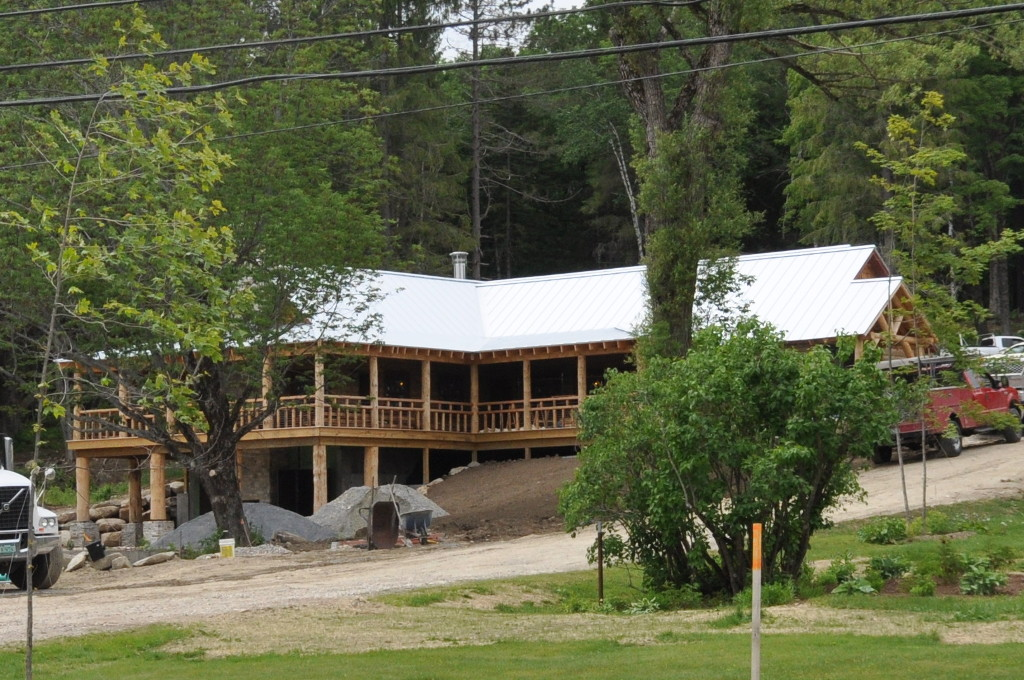

- Location within Vermont Location within the United States
- Location: 3574 VT 11, Peru, Vermont
- Coordinates: 43°12′57″N 72°55′35″W
- Area: 6.8 acres (2.8 ha)
- Built: 1924
- Architect: Sesow, John Ivan; Child, Josiah
- Architectural style: Saddle-notched-log inn
- NRHP reference No.: 08000686

Significant dates
- Added to NRHP: July 18, 2008
- Removed from NRHP: October 5, 2023

Johnny Seesaw's is a historic country lodge on Vermont Route 11, near the Bromley Mountain Ski Area in Peru, Vermont. Established in 1924, the lodge was an influential component of the early success of downhill skiing in southwestern Vermont, and is the place where events leading to the founding of both the National Ski Patrol and the United States Army's 10th Mountain Division took place. It was listed on the National Register of Historic Places in 2008, and was delisted in 2023. It is a full-service facility, offering accommodations, meals, and activities in all seasons.

== Description and history ==
Johnny Seesaw's is located in the Green Mountains of northeastern Bennington County, a short way east of the Bromley Mountain Ski Area, on the north side of Vermont Route 11. The main building is a 1-1/2 saddle-notched log structure with a broad gabled roof, with a shed-roofed wing to one side and a frame addition to the rear. Principal features of the front are a large fieldstone chimney, and a single-story porch extending across the front and around to the left side. Attached to one of the rear corners is the home of the lodge's builder, Ivan Sesow, which is now called the Annex. The property includes a number of guest cabins in a variety of styles; the most distinctive is a c. 1954 cabin done in the "butterfly" style promoted by architect Marcel Breuer.

The property has a documented history as an inn dating back to 1835, when Benamin Barnard, Jr. established an inn and tavern at this location. In 1924, John Ivan Sesow, a Russian immigrant who worked in the area's declining lumber industry, purchased the property and built the lodge as a dance hall and entertainment venue. Its design is supposedly based on that of the Russian izba, and was built over three years by Sesow and friends from the lumber camps, using only hand tools.

Sesow's Pavilion did well until Prohibition came to an end, and the Great Depression set in. The Sesows abandoned it in 1932, and the property was foreclosed the following year. In 1938, it was purchased by Lew deSchweinitz and Bill and Mary Parrish, who turned it into ski lodge, serving the recently established Bromley Mountain ski area. It was called "Johnny Seesaw's" in honor of its builder. They built a bunkhouse, and made other additions and alterations over the years.

Johnny Seesaw's was visited in its first year by Charles "Minnie" Dole, the founder of the National Ski Patrol, and hosted celebrities such as aviator Charles Lindbergh and future United States President Gerald Ford. Dole's activities, in addition to founding the ski patrol, included aggressively promoting the development of a military unit specializing in mountain and winter warfare, which eventually became the 10th Mountain Division.

== See also ==
- National Register of Historic Places listings in Bennington County, Vermont
