= Tudor House (Stamford, Vermont) =

Historic house in Vermont, United States

- U.S. National Register of Historic Places
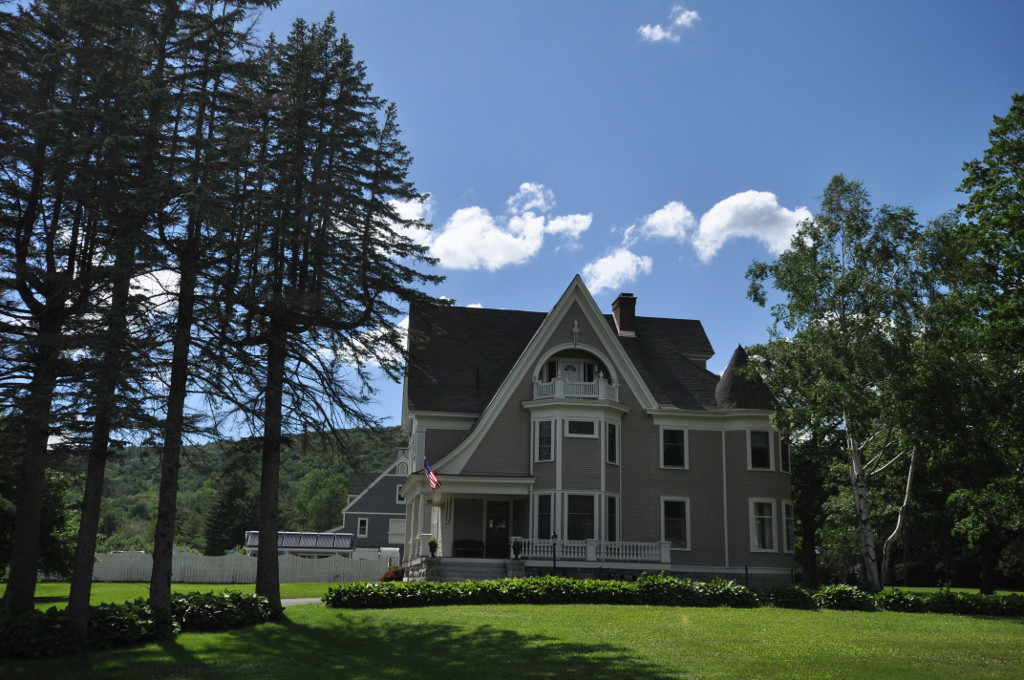

- Location within Vermont Location within the United States
- Location: VT 8, Stamford, Vermont
- Coordinates: 42°45′5″N 73°4′11″W
- Area: 10 acres (4.0 ha)
- Built: 1900
- Architectural style: Colonial Revival, Queen Anne
- NRHP reference No.: 79000218
- Added to NRHP: September 10, 1979

The Tudor House is a historic house on Vermont Route 8 in Stamford, Vermont. Built in 1900 by what was probably then the town's wealthiest residents, this transitional Queen Anne/Colonial Revival house is one of the most architecturally sophisticated buildings in the rural mountain community. It was listed on the National Register of Historic Places in 1979.

== Description and history ==
The Tudor House is located near the southern end of the Stamford's central village, on the west side of Main Road (Vermont Routes 8/100), between Jepson Road and The Lane. It is a 2 1/2-story wood-frame structure, basically rectangular in shape, with a hip roof, clapboard siding, and a stone foundation. Its shape is obscured by the exuberant Queen Anne wealth of projecting gables, turrets, bays, and porches. Predominant features of the front of the house are a rounded two-story turret-roofed projection on the right, and a tall gable on the left, whose roof slopes down to the first floor and shelters a recessed porch. Inside its gable is a recessed round-arch porch opening. The interior of the house features high quality woodwork in a more restrained Colonial Revival style.

The house was built in 1900 by John Tudor, a Welsh immigrant who had made a fortune as a mill owner in northern Vermont and settled in Stamford in 1890. Stamford was then experiencing a population decline, and most of its architecture is conservative and vernacular. This house, set in a somewhat prominent setting on the southern approach to the main village, is a striking departure from the surrounding houses because of its style and size. It was built for Tudor in 1900; its architect and builder are not known.

== See also ==
- National Register of Historic Places listings in Bennington County, Vermont
