= Carrigan Lane Historic District =

Historic district in Vermont, United States

- U.S. National Register of Historic Places
- U.S. Historic district
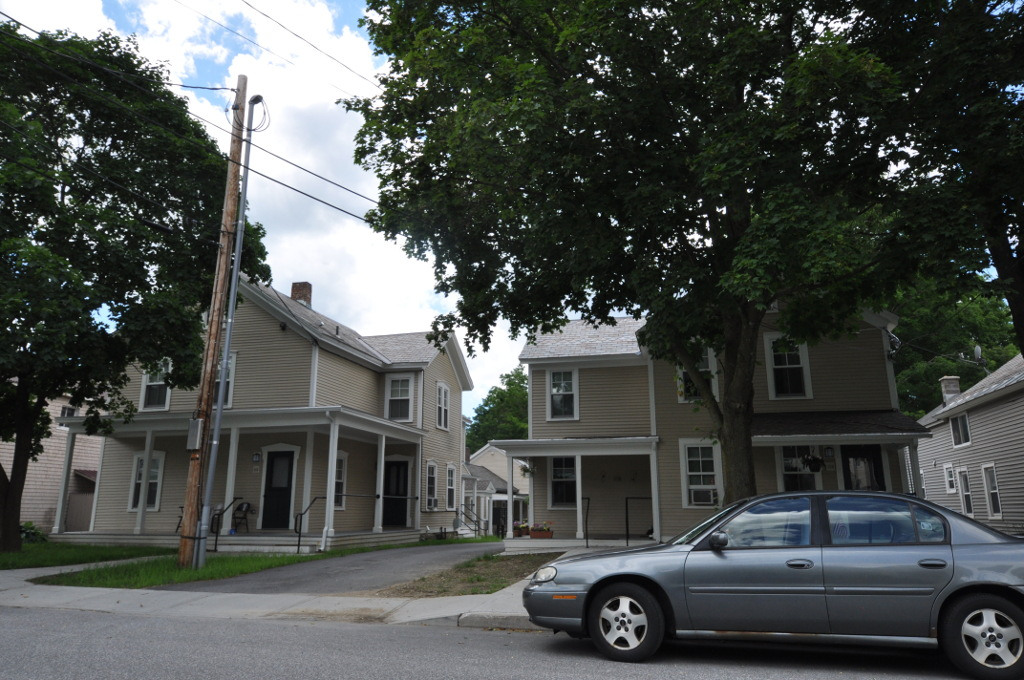
- Safford Street houses on either side of Carrigan Lane

- Location within Vermont Location within the United States
- Location: Roughly along Carrigan Ln., from Division St. to Safford St., Bennington, Vermont
- Coordinates: 42°52′59″N 73°11′19″W
- Area: less than one acre
- Architect: Thomas Carrigan
- Architectural style: Vernacular Italianate
- NRHP reference No.: 98001152
- Added to NRHP: September 3, 1998

The Carrigan Lane Historic District encompasses four residential structures on or near Carrigan Lane in Bennington, Vermont. All were built between 1875 and 1900, a period of growth in the town, by Thomas Carrigan, a machinist, and are a good example of the town's development at that time. The district was listed on the National Register of Historic Places in 1998.

== Description and history ==
Carrigan Lane is a narrow gravel lane between Safford and Division Streets, northeast of central downtown Bennington. The historic district includes the two houses that flank Carrigan Lane but face Safford Street (numbers 316 and 318), and two multiunit residences behind them (numbers 1-3 and 4-10 Carrigan Lane). All are 2 1/2-story wood-frame structures, basically vernacular in plan, with modest Italianate decoration, mainly on their porches. The two Safford Street houses are nearly identical in plan and appearance.

The town of Bennington experienced significant growth in its industries (mainly textile-related) in the second half of the 19th century. This growth resulted in increased demand for housing for its workers. Safford Street was laid out about 1850, extending away from Main Street, where the Safford Mills were located. Thomas Carrigan, an immigrant machinist from Ireland, moved to Bennington sometime before 1870, and was by 1880 listed as owner of the two Safford Street houses, which were built about 1875. Around 1890, when Bennington's knit goods industry began to expand, Carrigan subdivided his property, which apparently extended all the way to Division Street, and two houses were built facing Division Street, and the two multiunit buildings facing Carrigan Lane were built. The two Safford Street houses have also since been converted into multiunit housing.

== See also ==
- National Register of Historic Places listings in Bennington County, Vermont
