= H.C. White Company Mill Complex =

Historic place in Vermont, United States

- U.S. National Register of Historic Places
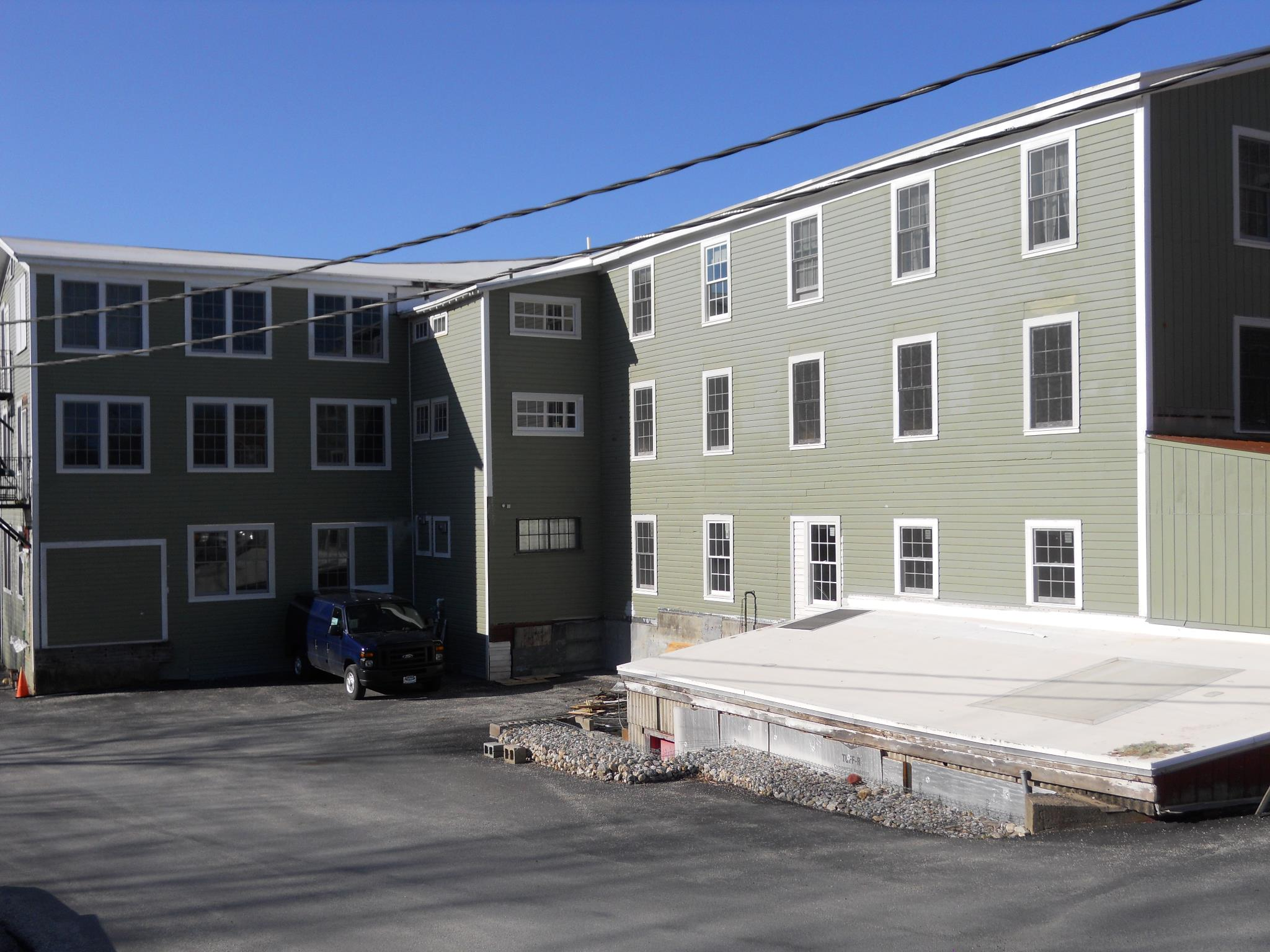

- Location within Vermont Location within the United States
- Location: 940 Water St., North Bennington, Vermont
- Coordinates: 42°54′56″N 73°14′48″W
- Area: 12.6 acres (5.1 ha)
- Built: 1887
- NRHP reference No.: 100000515
- Added to NRHP: January 11, 2017

The H.C. White Company Mill Complex, is a historic industrial complex at 140 Water Street in North Bennington, Vermont. The White Company was founded in 1879, producing stereographic viewers and stereograph cards, as well as the Kiddie-Kar, a three-wheeled wooden scooter for children. These premises were occupied by the company from then until its closure in 1935. The complex, with buildings dating from 1887 to 1919, was listed on the National Register of Historic Places in 2017.

== Description and history ==
The former White Company Mill complex is located on the south side of North Bennington, on the west bank of Paran Brook above its mouth at the Walloomsac River. The complex includes a number of brick and wood-frame buildings, as well as a c. 1900 concrete dam across the brook, creating a mill pond north of the complex. The oldest building in the complex is a timber-framed three-story building constructed in 1887, after an earlier mill building was destroyed by fire. The major feature of the complex is a larger three-story brick building dating to the late 1910s. Other significant buildings include a two-story office building and a smaller two-story factory building. A number of smaller buildings dot the 12-acre (4.9 ha) site.

Hawley C. White was a North Bennington native who learned the trade of grinding optical lenses in New York City. He returned to North Bennington in 1874, where he continued this trade, apparently in partnership with B.G. Surdam, producing lenses and stereoscope viewers. In 1878 White struck out on his own, acquiring this property, which then had industrial buildings already standing. These were destroyed by fire in 1887, after which White quickly rebuilt. In 1899 White expanded his business to include the production of stereoscopic images, sending photographers out to take pictures of the wonders of man and nature across the world. The company's high-quality images made it one of the leading producers of such imagery for over a decade. In the 1910s, seeking a new market, White embarked on the manufacture of wooden children's furniture and the highly popular Kiddie-Kar, a three-wheeled scooter. The company exited the steoroscope business in 1915, selling its image collection to the Keystone View Company. The company survived until 1935, when it went into receivership and closed. The complex has since been adapted to a variety of other uses, including office space, light industrial manufacturing, and residences.

Substantial expansion occurred following the Second World War when the building operated as a printing press. Building 3 (two floors, each 20,000 square feet) was then added in 1959 and Building 5 was added in 1969, providing a further 15,000 square feet of space. The next major use was under the ownership of Chem Fab, later St. Gobain. From the late 1970s the buildings served as a small business incubator under the management of Bennington County Industrial Corporation. In 2007 the buildings were acquired by HRH Management, a property development company. Since that time, the buildings have been heavily renovated to standards set by the National Park Service; the industrial uses have largely remained but a significant number of apartments have been constructed, giving the buildings a healthy new lease on life.

== See also ==
- National Register of Historic Places listings in Bennington County, Vermont
