= National Register of Historic Places listings in Bennington County, Vermont =

Location of Bennington County in Vermont

This is a list of the National Register of Historic Places listings in Bennington County, Vermont.

This is intended to be a complete list of the properties and districts on the National Register of Historic Places in Bennington County, Vermont, United States. Latitude and longitude coordinates are provided for many National Register properties and districts; these locations may be seen together in a map.

There are 54 properties and districts listed on the National Register in the county, and one former listing.

This National Park Service list is complete through NPS recent listings posted June 6, 2026.

Contents: Counties in Vermont
Addison - Bennington - Caledonia - Chittenden - Essex - Franklin - Grand Isle - Lamoille - Orange - Orleans - Rutland - Washington - Windham - Windsor

== Current listings ==
	Name on the Register	Image	Date listed	Location	City or town	Description
1	Arlington Green Covered Bridge	Arlington Green Covered Bridge	August 28, 1973 (#73000184)	Off VT 313 west of Arlington; 43°06′16″N 73°13′14″W	Arlington	
2	Arlington Village Historic District	Arlington Village Historic District	November 2, 1989 (#89001936)	Roughly Main St., School St., E. Arlington Rd., and Battenkill Dr. 43°04′22″N 73°09′23″W	Arlington	
3	Bennington Battle Monument	Bennington Battle Monument	March 31, 1971 (#71000054)	Monument Circle; 42°53′20″N 73°13′00″W	Bennington	
4	Bennington College Historic District	Bennington College Historic District	December 28, 2022 (#100008509)	1 College Dr. 42°55′12″N 73°14′07″W	Bennington	
5	Bennington Falls Covered Bridge	Bennington Falls Covered Bridge	August 28, 1973 (#73000185)	Northwest of Bennington off VT 67A; 42°54′46″N 73°14′03″W	Bennington	Also known as the Paper Mill Bridge
6	Bennington Fish Hatchery	Bennington Fish Hatchery	April 21, 1994 (#94000376)	South Stream Rd. 42°51′09″N 73°10′20″W	Bennington	
7	Bennington High School	Bennington High School	August 26, 2005 (#05000948)	650 Main St. 42°52′43″N 73°11′24″W	Bennington	Bennington's 1913 high school building
8	Bennington Post Office	Bennington Post Office	December 12, 1976 (#76000137)	118 South St. 42°52′39″N 73°11′49″W	Bennington	Former post office, now houses the police department
9	Bennington Railroad Station	Bennington Railroad Station	November 9, 1988 (#88001301)	Depot and River Sts. 42°52′54″N 73°11′58″W	Bennington	
10	W. H. Bradford Hook and Ladder Fire House	W. H. Bradford Hook and Ladder Fire House	October 28, 1999 (#99001295)	212 Safford St. 42°52′52″N 73°11′19″W	Bennington	
11	William C. Bull House		March 28, 2022 (#100007531)	219 Pleasant St. 42°52′45″N 73°11′33″W	Bennington	
12	E. J. Bullock Block		September 21, 2021 (#100007005)	7012 Main St. 42°46′20″N 72°56′54″W	Readsboro	
13	Carrigan Lane Historic District	Carrigan Lane Historic District	September 3, 1998 (#98001152)	Roughly along Carrigan Ln., from Division St. to Safford St. 42°52′59″N 73°11′19″W	Bennington	
14	Center Shaftsbury Historic District	Center Shaftsbury Historic District	November 9, 1988 (#88002052)	VT 7A; 42°59′05″N 73°12′42″W	Shaftsbury	
15	Dellwood Cemetery	Dellwood Cemetery	June 5, 2026 (#100013118)	2950 Main Street; 43°09′08″N 73°04′28″W	Manchester	
15	Dorset Village Historic District	Dorset Village Historic District	April 18, 1985 (#85000868)	Roughly bounded by Main and Church Sts. and Dorset Hollow Rd.; also the junction of Church St. and West Rd. 43°15′26″N 73°06′15″W	Dorset	Second set of boundaries represents a boundary increase
16	Downtown Bennington Historic District	Downtown Bennington Historic District	April 1, 1980 (#80000327)	U.S. Route 7 and VT 9; also North, Main, and Silver Sts. 42°52′43″N 73°11′51″W	Bennington	Second set of boundaries represents a boundary increase
17	East Arlington Village Historic District	East Arlington Village Historic District	July 5, 1996 (#96000689)	Roughly bounded by Old Mill, Ice Pond, E. Arlington, and Warm Brook Rds., Maple and Pleasnt Sts., and the Lane; 43°03′42″N 73°08′40″W	Arlington	
18	Equinox House Historic District	Equinox House Historic District	November 21, 1972 (#72000107)	Main and Union Sts. 43°09′43″N 73°04′25″W	Manchester	Boundary increased June 3, 1980
19	First Congregational Church of Bennington	First Congregational Church of Bennington	April 24, 1973 (#73000186)	Monument Ave. 42°53′00″N 73°12′48″W	Bennington	
20	Robert Frost Farm	Robert Frost Farm	May 23, 1968 (#68000047)	0.25 mi (0.40 km) west of U.S. Route 7 on Buck Hill Rd. 42°56′28″N 73°11′42″W	South Shaftsbury	Residence of poet Robert Frost between 1929 and 1938. Designated a National Historic Landmark in 1968, the Park Service withdrew the landmark designation in 1986.
21	Furnace Grove Historic District	Furnace Grove Historic District	June 27, 1997 (#97000646)	VT 9, 1 mi (1.6 km) east of the junction of VT 9 and Burgess Rd. 42°53′06″N 73°09′24″W	Bennington	
22	Gov. Jonas Galusha Homestead	Gov. Jonas Galusha Homestead	November 30, 1979 (#79000217)	3817 Vermont Route 7A; 42°59′17″N 73°12′24″W	Center Shaftsbury	
23	Zera Hard House	Zera Hard House	November 9, 1988 (#88002230)	River Rd. 43°07′49″N 73°04′56″W	Manchester	
24	Henry Covered Bridge	Henry Covered Bridge	August 28, 1973 (#73000187)	Northwest of Bennington off VT 67A; 42°54′45″N 73°15′18″W	Bennington	
25	William Henry House	William Henry House	November 9, 1988 (#88001302)	River Rd. 42°54′30″N 73°15′20″W	Bennington	
26	Hildene	Hildene	October 28, 1977 (#77000095)	820 Hildene Rd. 43°08′13″N 73°04′25″W	Manchester	
27	Holden-Leonard Mill Complex	Holden-Leonard Mill Complex	November 14, 1988 (#88002085)	160 Benmont Ave. 42°53′06″N 73°12′13″W	Bennington	
28	Holden-Leonard Workers Housing Historic District	Holden-Leonard Workers Housing Historic District	May 19, 2011 (#11000296)	121-139, 124-150 Benmont Ave. & 105-115, 117-123 Holden St. 42°53′00″N 73°12′07″W	Bennington	
29	Jenks Tavern	Jenks Tavern	March 17, 1994 (#94000191)	Junction of Dorset West Rd. and VT 315; 43°16′20″N 73°07′35″W	Rupert	
30	Kent Neighborhood Historic District	Kent Neighborhood Historic District	July 14, 1978 (#78003203)	South of Dorset at Dorset West and Nichols Hill Rds. 43°14′22″N 73°05′54″W	Dorset	
31	Amos Lawrence House	Amos Lawrence House	May 21, 1985 (#85001245)	Richville Rd. 43°09′55″N 73°03′11″W	Manchester	
32	Manchester Village Historic District	Manchester Village Historic District	January 26, 1984 (#84003438)	U.S. Route 7A, Union St., and Taconic Ave. 43°09′38″N 73°04′22″W	Manchester	
33	Manley-Lefevre House	Manley-Lefevre House	January 26, 1990 (#89002324)	Dorset West Rd., Town Highway 1; 43°13′36″N 73°05′13″W	Dorset	
34	David Mathews House	David Mathews House	September 10, 1979 (#79000274)	VT 67; 42°56′27″N 73°16′28″W	Shaftsbury	Extends into Rensselaer County, New York; also known as the State Line House.
35	Munro-Hawkins House	Munro-Hawkins House	May 17, 1973 (#73000188)	0.5 mi (0.80 km) south of Shaftsbury Center on Vermont Route 7A; 42°57′24″N 73°12′31″W	Shaftsbury Center	
36	North Bennington Depot	North Bennington Depot	April 11, 1973 (#73000189)	Buckley Rd. and Depot St. at the Vermont Railway tracks 42°55′56″N 73°14′32″W	North Bennington	
37	North Bennington Historic District	North Bennington Historic District	August 29, 1980 (#80000328)	VT 67 and VT 67A; 42°55′48″N 73°14′35″W	North Bennington	
38	Julius and Sophia Norton House		February 23, 2021 (#100006180)	300 Pleasant St. 42°52′44″N 73°11′34″W	Bennington	
39	Old Bennington Historic District	Old Bennington Historic District	October 4, 1984 (#84000030)	Roughly bounded by the former Rutland Railway line, Monument Ave. and Circle, West Rd., Seminary Lane, and Elm and Fairview Sts. 42°53′01″N 73°12′45″W	Bennington	
40	The Orchards	The Orchards	April 24, 2000 (#00000384)	982 Mansion Dr. 42°52′08″N 73°13′13″W	Bennington	Now the campus of Southern Vermont College
41	Park-McCullough House	Park-McCullough House	October 26, 1972 (#72000090)	Southwestern corner of West and Park Sts. 42°55′42″N 73°14′49″W	North Bennington	
42	Pratt-McDaniels-LaFlamme House	Pratt-McDaniels-LaFlamme House	July 11, 2002 (#02000777)	501-507 South St. 42°52′21″N 73°11′50″W	Bennington	
43	Ritchie Block	Ritchie Block	November 6, 1986 (#86003060)	465-473 Main St. 42°52′39″N 73°11′44″W	Bennington	
44	Rupert Village Historic District	Rupert Village Historic District	January 4, 2022 (#100007308)	VT 153, Rupert Mountain, West Pawlet, and Youlin Rds. 43°15′36″N 73°13′22″W	Rupert	
45	School Street Duplexes	School Street Duplexes	March 13, 2007 (#07000162)	343-345 and 347-349 School St. 42°53′09″N 73°11′40″W	Bennington	
46	Silk Covered Bridge	Silk Covered Bridge	August 28, 1973 (#73000190)	Northwest of Bennington off VT 67A; 42°54′34″N 73°13′33″W	Bennington	
47	Frederick Squire House	Frederick Squire House	July 30, 1992 (#92000964)	185 North St. 42°52′53″N 73°11′48″W	Bennington	
48	Tudor House	Tudor House	September 10, 1979 (#79000218)	VT 8; 42°45′05″N 73°04′11″W	Stamford	
49	Wait Block	Wait Block	November 7, 1996 (#96001327)	Near the junction of Main and Bonnet Sts. in Manchester Center; 43°10′36″N 73°03′24″W	Manchester	
50	H.C. White Company Mill Complex	H.C. White Company Mill Complex	January 11, 2017 (#100000515)	940 Water St. 42°54′56″N 73°14′48″W	North Bennington	
51	Cora B. Whitney School	Cora B. Whitney School	November 19, 2001 (#01001237)	814 Gage St. 42°52′53″N 73°10′59″W	Bennington	
52	Wilson House	Wilson House	December 13, 1995 (#95001427)	Junction of Village St. and Mad Tom Rd. 43°14′22″N 73°00′33″W	East Dorset	
53	Yester House	Yester House	November 10, 1988 (#88002051)	West Rd. 43°10′39″N 73°04′39″W	Manchester	Now the Southern Vermont Arts Center

== Former listings ==
	Name on the Register	Image	Date listed	Date removed	Location	City or town	Description
1	Johnny Seesaw's Historic District	Johnny Seesaw's Historic District	July 18, 2008 (#08000686)	October 5, 2023	3574 VT 11; 43°12′58″N 72°55′28″W	Peru	

== See also ==
- List of National Historic Landmarks in Vermont
- National Register of Historic Places listings in Vermont
