= Pratt-McDaniels-LaFlamme House =

Historic house in Vermont, United States

- Pratt-McDaniels-LaFlamme HOuse
- U.S. National Register of Historic Places
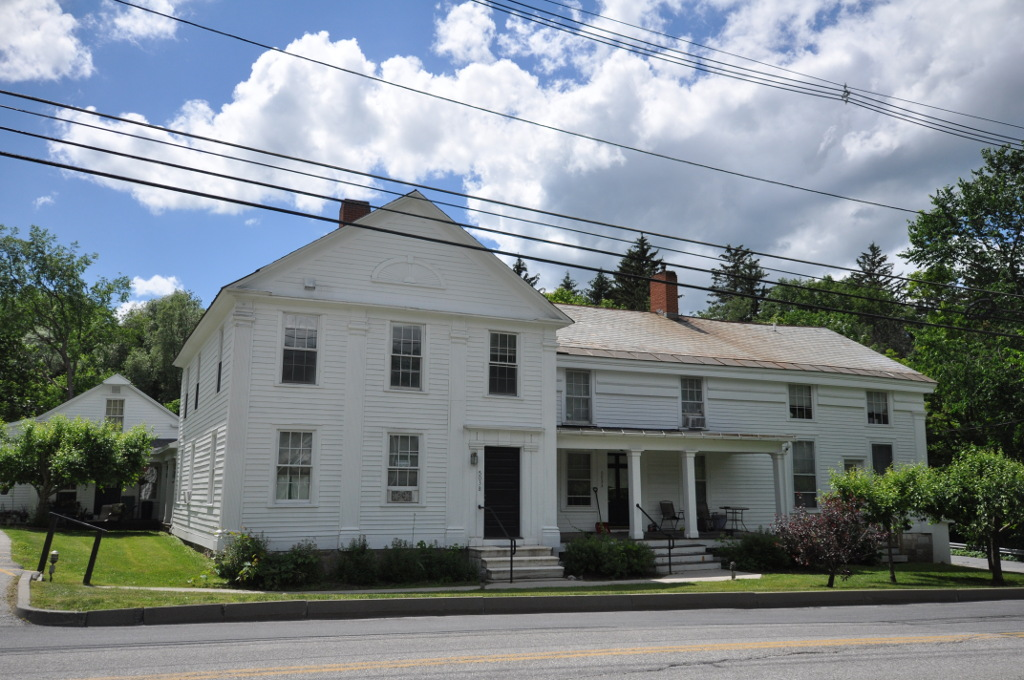

- Location within Vermont Location within the United States
- Location: 501-507 South St., Bennington, Vermont
- Coordinates: 42°52′21″N 73°11′50″W
- Area: 1.7 acres (0.69 ha)
- Built: 1800
- Architectural style: Federal, Greek Revival
- NRHP reference No.: 02000777
- Added to NRHP: July 11, 2002

The Pratt-McDaniels-LaFlamme House is a historic house at 501-507 South Street in Bennington, Vermont. Built about 1800, this Federal period building encapsulates the changing residential trends in the town over a 200-year historic, starting as a farm house, then that as a businessman, and eventually subdivided into worker housing. It was listed on the National Register of Historic Places in 2002.

== Description and history ==
The Pratt-McDaniels-LaFlamme House is located on the west side of South Street (United States Route 7), south of downtown Bennington, between Prospect and Merson Streets. The property includes the main house, housing three residential units, and a detached outbuilding that has been adapted to house a fourth unit. The main house is a 2 1/2-story wood-frame structure with a gable-fronted main block and a two-story ell extending north that is covered by a hip roof. The building corners are pilastered, and there are also pilasters between the three front-facing bays of the main block. The main block's gable is fully pedimented, with a Federal style fan at its center. One entrance is found in the main block's rightmost bay, with framing pilasters and entablature with cornice. The front facade of the ell has four bays of windows, with two entrances set between. The left unit has a flat-roof porch extending across it, supported by square posts.

The house was probably built about 1798, the year in which Stephen Pratt purchased 100 acres (40 ha). Pratt by then already had a large family. It remained in agricultural use until the late 1830s, when the house was subdivided off and sold to his granddaughter Erin and her husband, Thomas McDaniels. McDaniels is believed to have added the north wing, with its northern end probably serving as his business office. He was a businessman and banker, underwriting business ventures in Bennington's increasingly industrial economy. The house grew further in the second half of the 19th century, with several wings added, and probably housed several generations of the family. It was purchased in 1913 by John LaFlamme, whose extended family lived there, formally subdividing the building into four units. It was owned by the LaFlamme family into the 1990s. It has since been rehabilitated, with some of its additions demolished, and its units used for low-income housing.

== See also ==
- National Register of Historic Places listings in Bennington County, Vermont
