= Rupert Village Historic District =

Historic district in Vermont, United States

- U.S. National Register of Historic Places
- U.S. Historic district
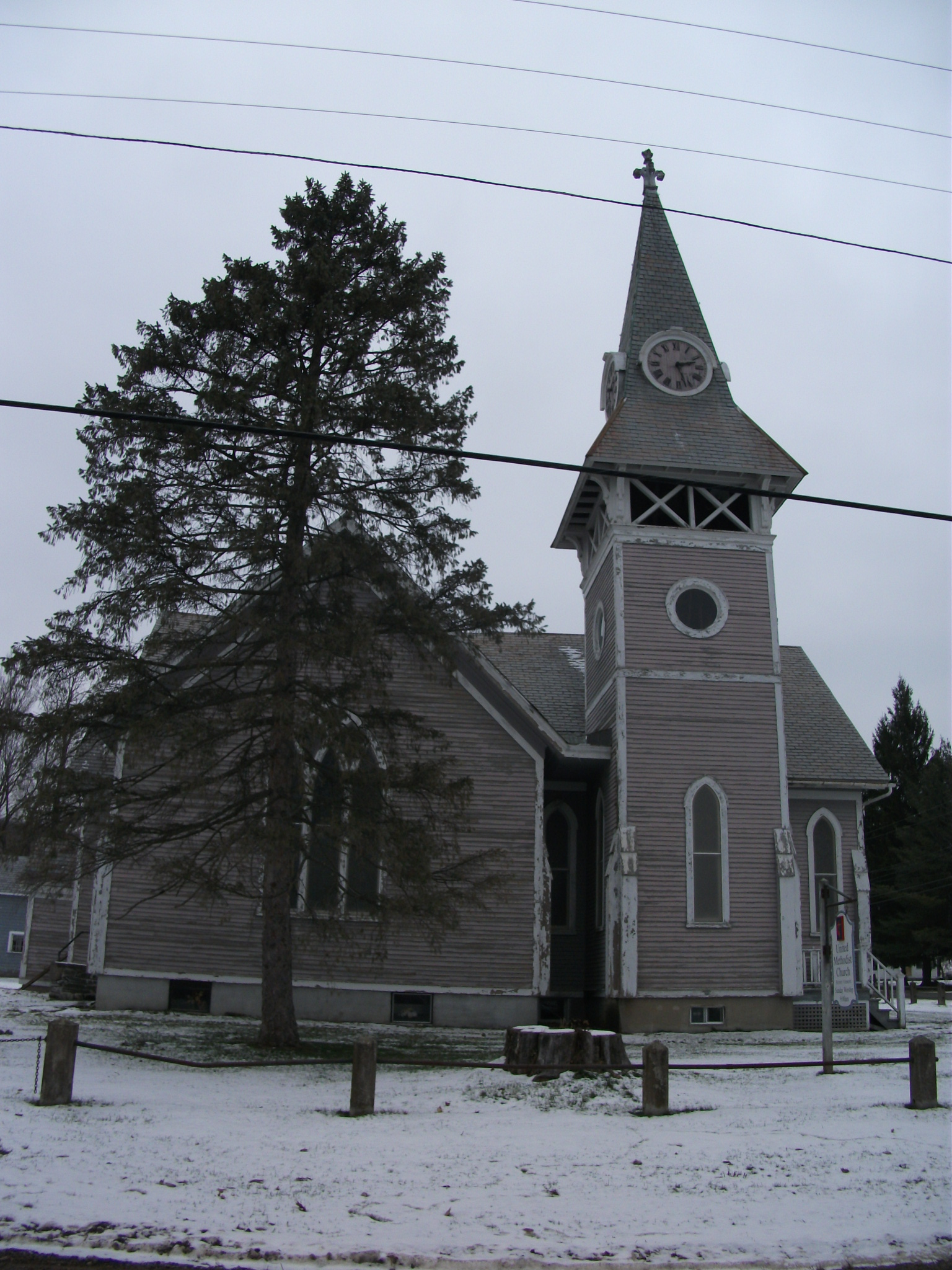
- Rupert Methodist Church

- Location within Vermont Location within the United States
- Location: VT 153, Rupert Mountain, West Pawlet, and Youlin Rds., Rupert, Vermont
- Coordinates: 43°15′36″N 73°13′22″W
- Area: 145 acres (59 ha)
- Built: 1786
- NRHP reference No.: 100007308
- Added to NRHP: January 4, 2022

The Rupert Village Historic District encompasses the 19th-century village center of Rupert, Vermont. Extending along Vermont Route 153 and adjacent roads, the village preserves a 19th-century landscape and a variety of structures important in the life and economy of the period. The district was listed on the National Register of Historic Places in 2022.

== Description and history ==
Rupert is a small rural community in southwestern Vermont which has had a generally agrarian economy since it was settled in the 1770s. Its village centered developed in the southwestern part of the town, near the confluence of the Indian River and Mill Brook. The village's oldest surviving building, the Congregational church, was built there in 1786, and it was for many years its center of civic affairs. The town grew rapidly in the years after American independence, reaching a peak population of 1600 in 1820. The village remained a focal point of the community, particularly after the arrival of the railroad in 1852.

The historic district extends mainly along Route 153 for about 0.5 miles (0.80 km), extending north from the railroad in the south to Youlin Road and Rupert Mountain Road in the north. In addition to 74 historically significant structures, the district includes surrounding open land that historically formed an important part of the village's rural character. Most of the buildings in the district are wood-frame structures built in vernacular forms of architectural styles popular in the 19th century. The most architecturally elaborate building is the Methodist church, a Gothic structure built in 1884 with funding from J.H. Guild, the village's wealthiest resident and owner of a small patent medicine factory.

== See also ==
- National Register of Historic Places listings in Bennington County, Vermont
