= Furnace Grove Historic District =

Historic district in Vermont, United States

- U.S. National Register of Historic Places
- U.S. Historic district
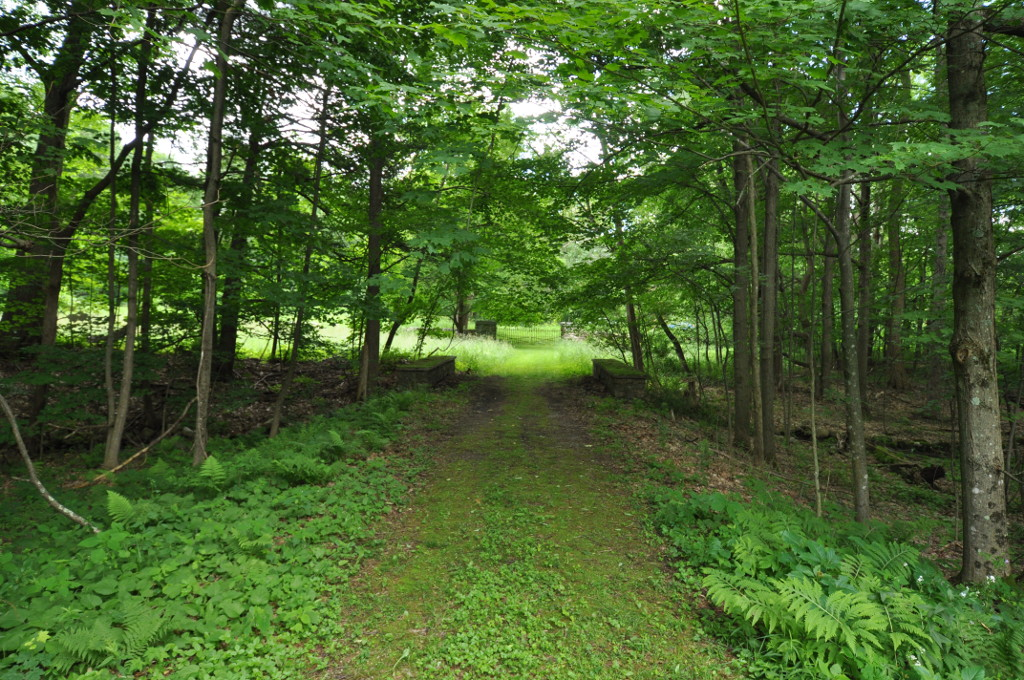

- Location within Vermont Location within the United States
- Location: VT 9, 1 mi. E. of jct of VT 9 and Burgess Rd., Bennington, Vermont
- Coordinates: 42°53′6″N 73°9′24″W
- Area: 102 acres (41 ha)
- Built: 1822
- Architectural style: Federal, Queen Anne, Blast Furnace
- NRHP reference No.: 97000646
- Added to NRHP: June 27, 1997

The Furnace Grove Historic District encompasses the remains of a historic 19th-century iron processing facility near Bennington, Vermont. Located on the north side of Vermont Route 9 east of the town center, its production peaked in the 1830s, and was afterward converted into a gentleman's farm. Surviving elements of its past include the remains of iron smelting furnaces (some of only few in the state), housing, and agricultural outbuildings. The district was listed on the National Register of Historic Places in 1997.

== Description and history ==
Furnace Grove stands on the rural eastern outskirts of Bennington, on the north side of Vermont Route 9. The property includes 102 acres (41 ha) sandwiched between a branch of the Walloomsac River to the south and the Green Mountains to the north, and includes three surviving residential structures, a number of agricultural outbuildings, and the industrial remains of its iron foundry past. Few alterations have been made to the landscape since the early 20th century. One of the oldest surviving buildings is a c. 1805 building, originally used as the foundry's company store, and now a private residence. The prominent houses of the complex are the Leake House, a Queen Anne/Colonial Revival building whose oldest parts date to 1830, and the Leavenworth House, a brick 1-1/2 story Federal period house, also with later alterations. Structural ruins of two of the foundry's furnaces survive; a third was broken down, and its stone used to build the gates at the entrance to the area. Also surviving are the remains of a canal and holding pond that provided water to the facility, and a portion of the Bennington and Glastenbury Railroad right-of-way.

The iron furnace was established here in 1805, by owners of another nearby furnace whose ore sources were played out. The success of this location was such that the town of Bennington was forced to improve its roads to the area, and at its peak the operators employed 150-200 workers. At its 1831 peak, the two active blast furnaces produced 7 tons of pig iron daily, and also had a smaller cupola furnace capable of further refining pig iron into a product suitable for producing utilitarian iron products, such as cauldrons, fireboxes, cooking stoves, plow points, and machinery parts. The furnace closed in 1842, unable to compete with larger and more advantageously placed businesses, and hampered by issues with its ore sources. In the second half of the 19th century, the property was transformed into a summer country retreat.

== See also ==
- National Register of Historic Places listings in Bennington County, Vermont
