= Bennington Fish Hatchery =

- U.S. National Register of Historic Places
- U.S. Historic district
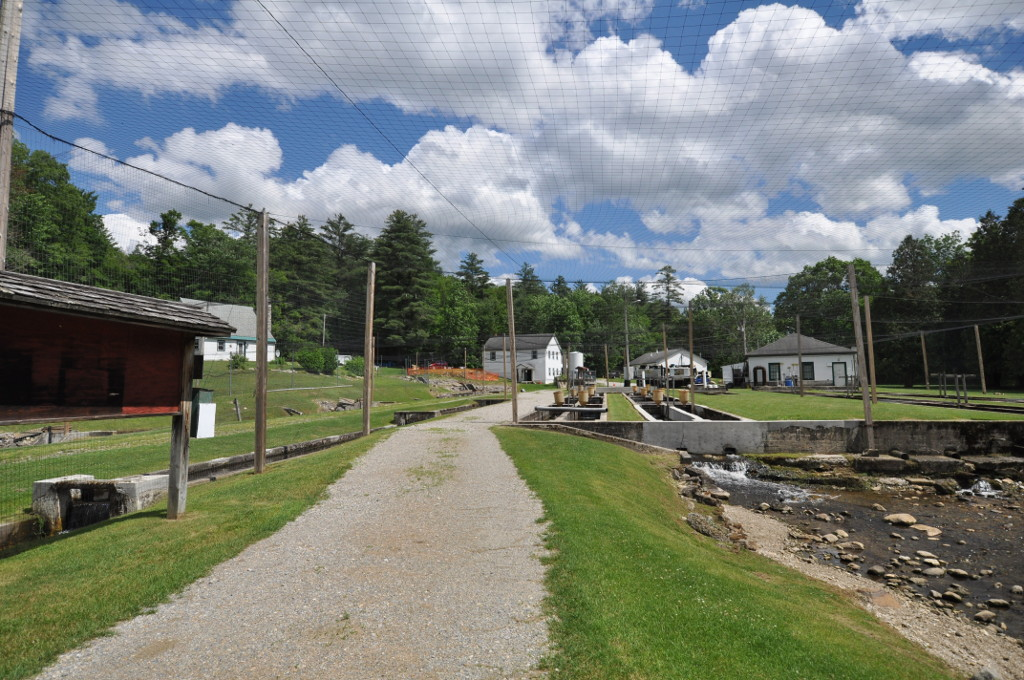

- Location within Vermont Location within the United States
- Location: South Stream Rd., Bennington, Vermont
- Coordinates: 42°51′9″N 73°10′20″W
- Area: 118.5 acres (48.0 ha)
- Built: 1916
- Built by: Lambert & Burrington
- Architectural style: Colonial Revival
- MPS: Fish Culture Resources of Vermont MPS
- NRHP reference No.: 94000376
- Added to NRHP: April 21, 1994

The Bennington Fish Hatchery, also known as the Bennington Fish Culture Station, is a state-operated fish hatchery at 110 Hatchery Road in Bennington, Vermont, USA. The station, the state's largest, produces a variety of trout, which are used to stock the state's water resources. Its facilities, dating to 1916, are listed on the National Register of Historic Places. The station has a visitors' center that is open daily.

== Description ==
The Bennington Fish Culture Station is located southeast of downtown Bennington, on the east side of South Stream Road, which generally parallels South Stream, a north-flowing tributary of the Walloomsac River. The station has infrastructure on both sides of the stream, including a small cluster of buildings and a series of fish ponds and raceways, on more than 118 acres (48 ha) of property.

Buildings of the complex include several that date to the hatchery's founding as an experimental station in 1916. These include the original superintendent's office and residence, which now serves as its visitors' center, and the main hatchery building, a handsome Colonial Revival structure, both of which were completed in 1917.

The fishery currently produces stocks of brown trout, brook trout and rainbow trout, which are distributed to Vermont's lakes and ponds.

== History ==
The station was established by the state on an experimental basis in 1916, after an earlier experimental station in Arlington was found inadequate. This one was made permanent after the quality and reliability of its water sources was assured. It grew to become a model fish hatchery by the 1930s, distributing thousands of pounds of fingerlings and fry throughout the state. Its facilities were significantly expanded in the 1940s with funding from the Works Progress Administration.

== See also ==
- National Register of Historic Places listings in Bennington County, Vermont
