= Hard Farm Homestead =

Historic house in Vermont, United States

- Zera Hard House
- U.S. National Register of Historic Places
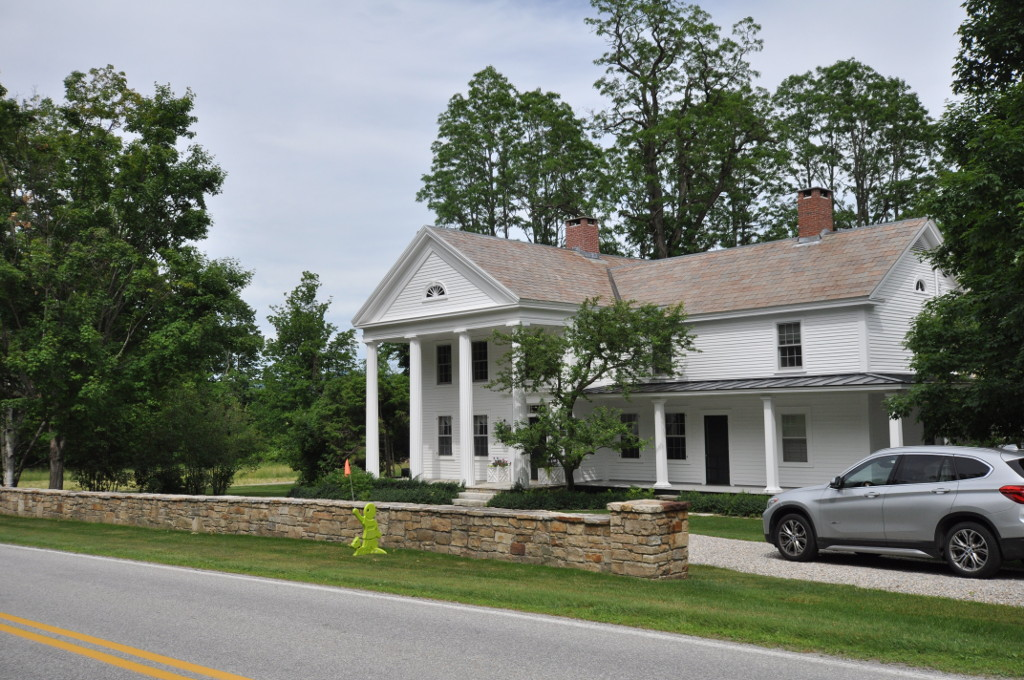

- Location within Vermont Location within the United States
- Location: River Rd., Manchester, Vermont
- Coordinates: 43°7′49″N 73°4′56″W
- Area: 7.7 acres (3.1 ha)
- Built: 1804
- Built by: Jesse Hard, Zera Hard
- Architectural style: Greek Revival, Cape Cod
- NRHP reference No.: 88002230
- Added to NRHP: November 9, 1988

The Hard Farm Homestead, also known as the Zera Hard House, is a historic farm complex on River Road in Manchester, Vermont. Consisting of an early 19th-century Cape, an 1840s Greek Revival house, and a number of 19th-century outbuildings, it represents a rare surviving assemblage of farm buildings in the town. It was listed on the National Register of Historic Places in 1988.

== Description and history ==
The Hard Farm Homestead is located in southern Manchester, its buildings on either side of River Road, just north of Muddy Lane. The main house is set on the east side of the street, overlooking the Battenkill River. It is a 2 1/2-story wood-frame structure, with a prominent two-story Greek Revival temple portico facing the street. Across the street stand a 1 1/2-story Cape style house, along with a barn, corn crib, shed, and chicken coop, all dating to the 19th century. A 20th-century garage stands adjacent to the main house. The construction method of the main house is an unusual form of plank construction, in which planking is laid horizontally (rather than vertically as in typical plank frame construction), with layers randomly overlapping and joined by spikes.

The oldest building of the complex is the Cape, which was, according to Hard family records, built by Quakers named Soper about 1806. It was later purchased by Jesse Hard, and it was his son Zera who built the Greek Revival house about 1840. The Hard family has long had a prominent place in Manchester, one of its members operating the drugstore in the center, and another a noted local poet. The Greek Revival temple front of the main house is a particular rarity in the town.

== See also ==
- National Register of Historic Places listings in Bennington County, Vermont
