= Dorset Village Historic District =

Historic district in Vermont, United States

- U.S. National Register of Historic Places
- U.S. Historic district
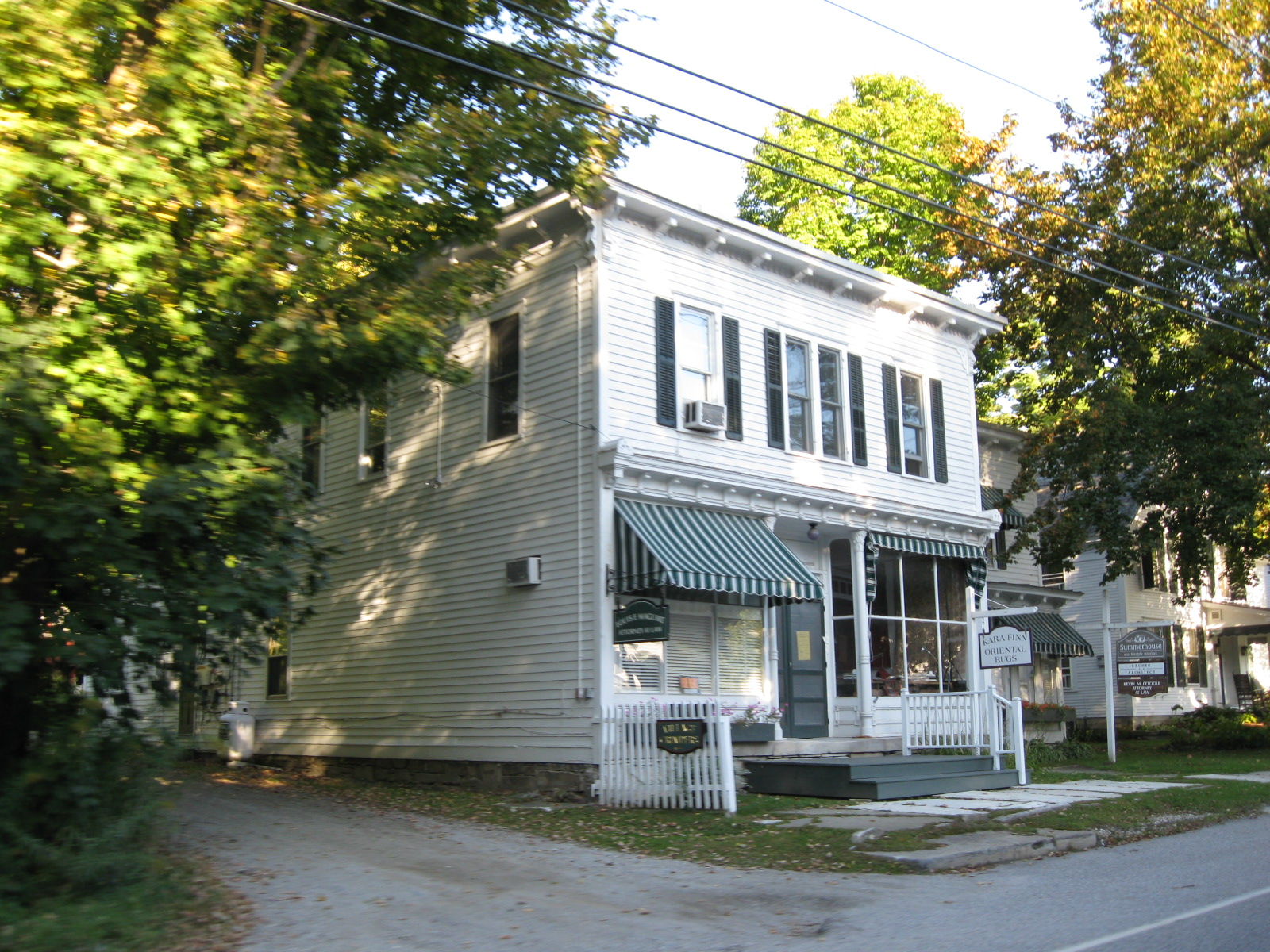
- A shop in Dorset Village

- Location within Vermont Location within the United States
- Location: Roughly bounded by Main and Church Sts. and Dorset Hollow Rd., and West Rd., Dorset, Vermont
- Coordinates: 43°15′17″N 73°5′56″W
- Area: 158 acres (64 ha) (original); 75 acres (30 ha) (increase)
- Architectural style: Federal, Late Victorian, Greek Revival
- NRHP reference No.: 85000868 (original); 97000040 (increase)

Significant dates
- Added to NRHP: April 18, 1985
- Boundary increase: February 07, 1997

The Dorset Village Historic District encompasses a significant portion of the village center of Dorset, Vermont. Centered at the junction of Church Street, Kent Hill Road, and Vermont Route 30, the village was developed between the late 18th and early 20th centuries, and has a number of well-preserved unusual features, including sidewalks of marble from local quarries. The district was listed on the National Register of Historic Places in 1985, and was enlarged to the west in 1997.

== Description and history ==
Dorset is a town in northern Bennington County, in the Taconic Range of western Vermont. Its village center is in the western portion of the town, whose major north–south route, Vermont Route 30, traverses the valley of the Mettawee River. At its junction with Church Street and Kent Hill Road, Route 30 is on the east side of the river, with Church Street extending west, across the river, to West Road. These two roads form the heart of the district, which extends north and south from their junction. A cluster of wood frame commercial buildings are to be found there, along with a number of mainly 19th-century wood-frame houses. Notable public buildings include the marble-faced Gothic Revival Congregational Church, and the c. 1800 Sykes Memorial Building of the Dorset Village Library. Some of the sidewalks along Church Street are faced in marble, quarried locally at some Vermont's oldest marble quarries. Extending westward along Church Street the village becomes more dispersed and residential, although there was once a gristmill adjacent to Prentiss Pond. The district also includes the Dorset Golf Links, one of the oldest golf courses in the nation (founded 1886).

The town of Dorset was chartered in 1768, and it was at the tavern of Cephas Kent (about 2 miles (3.2 km) south of the village center), that the idea of Vermont's independence from the claims of New York and New Hampshire was first discussed in 1777. This was followed later in the year by the establishment of the Vermont Republic, which operated independently until becoming the fourteenth state in 1791. Dorset grew first as a mainly agricultural area, but received a significant boost when marble from its quarries became prized for a variety of projects nationwide. The lack of significant water power, and later of good rail connections, limited the village center's growth in the 19th century, and it was eclipsed in importance by East Dorset.

When the historic district was first listed on the National Register in 1985, it only extended as far west as Prentiss Pond, roughly midway along Church Street. It was enlarged in 1997 to include the residential areas west of the pond to West Road, extending north and south along that road for a way.

== See also ==
- National Register of Historic Places listings in Bennington County, Vermont
