= Wait Block =

- U.S. National Register of Historic Places
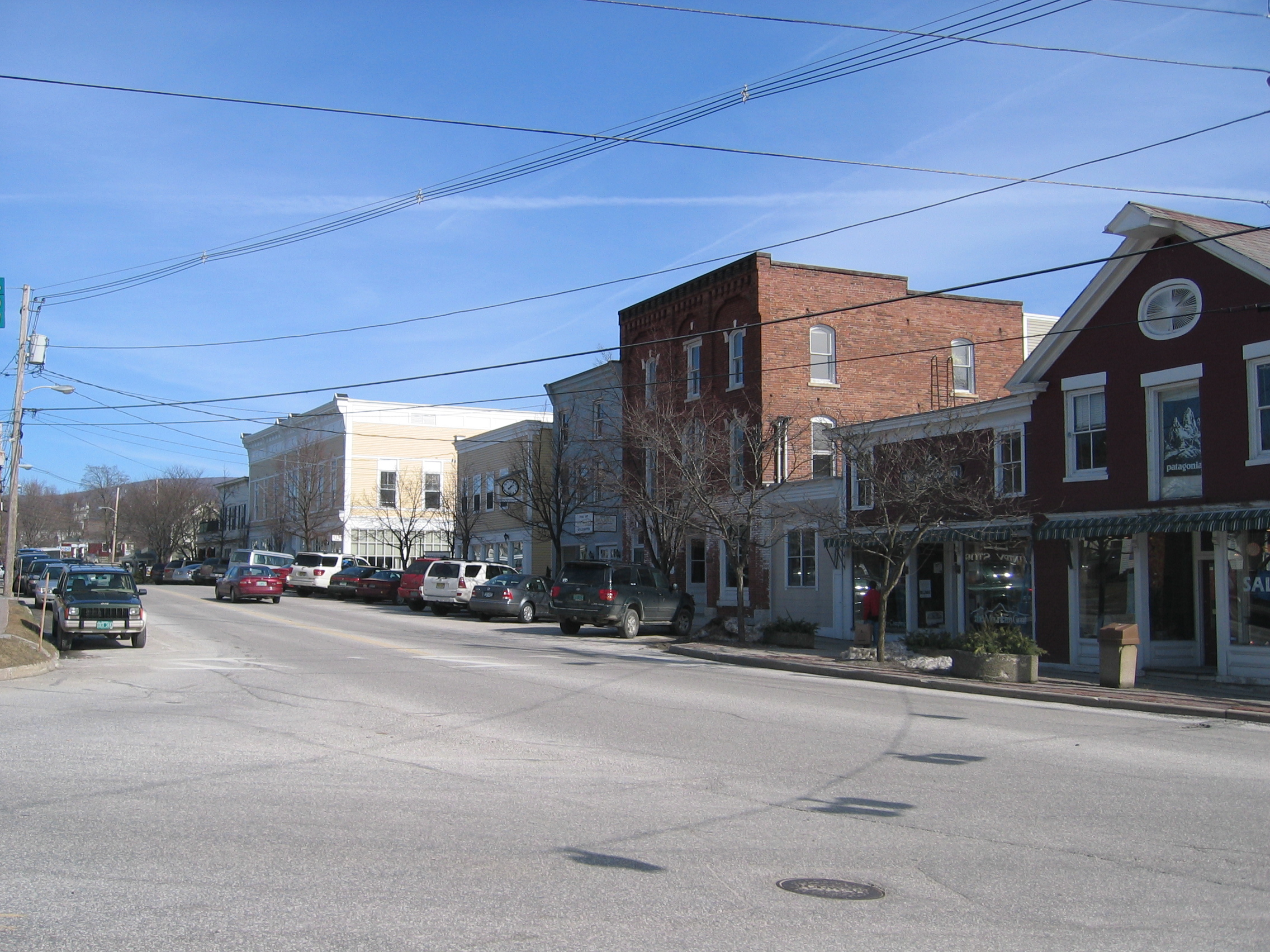
- The Wait Block is the brick building at the center of this photo

- Location within Vermont Location within the United States
- Location: Near jct. of Main and Bonnet Sts., Manchester Center Village, Manchester, Vermont
- Coordinates: 43°10′36″N 73°3′24″W
- Area: 0.1 acres (0.040 ha)
- Built: 1884
- Architectural style: Italianate
- NRHP reference No.: 96001327
- Added to NRHP: November 7, 1996

The Wait Block is a historic commercial building on Main Street (Vermont Route 7A) in Manchester Center, Vermont. Built in 1884–85, it is a distinctive late example of vernacular Italianate design, executed in brick and marble. It notably survived the 1893 fire that devastated the village's business district. It was listed on the National Register of Historic Places in 1996.

== Description and history ==
The Wait Block stands in the heart of Manchester Center's commercial business district, just east of the junction of Main Street (Vermont 7A) and Bonnet Street (Vermont Route 30) on the south side of Main Street. It is a three-story brick structure, three bays wide, with a flat roof and marble trim elements. The facade is divided into three arched panels, articulated by brick pilasters, the center panel narrower than the outer ones. Windows on the upper levels are set in segmented-arch openings, with keystones and ears of marble. The main entrance is set in a paneled recess in the center bay, with large glass display windows in the flanking bays on the ground floor, also set in segmented-arch openings. A line of corbelled brickwork provides a minimal cornice for the flat roof.

The building was constructed in 1884–85 for Clark Wait, owner of the local drug store. Its ground floor would house a drug store for the next century, with living quarters for the proprietor above. It notably survived the 1893 fire that destroyed many wood-frame buildings in the business district. It was built during a time of relative prosperity in the village's industries, which were in decline by the time of the fire and never really recovered. As a result, no other buildings of this scale were built in the village.

== See also ==
- National Register of Historic Places listings in Bennington County, Vermont
