= W. H. Bradford Hook and Ladder Fire House =

- W.H. Bradford Hook and Ladder Fire House
- U.S. National Register of Historic Places
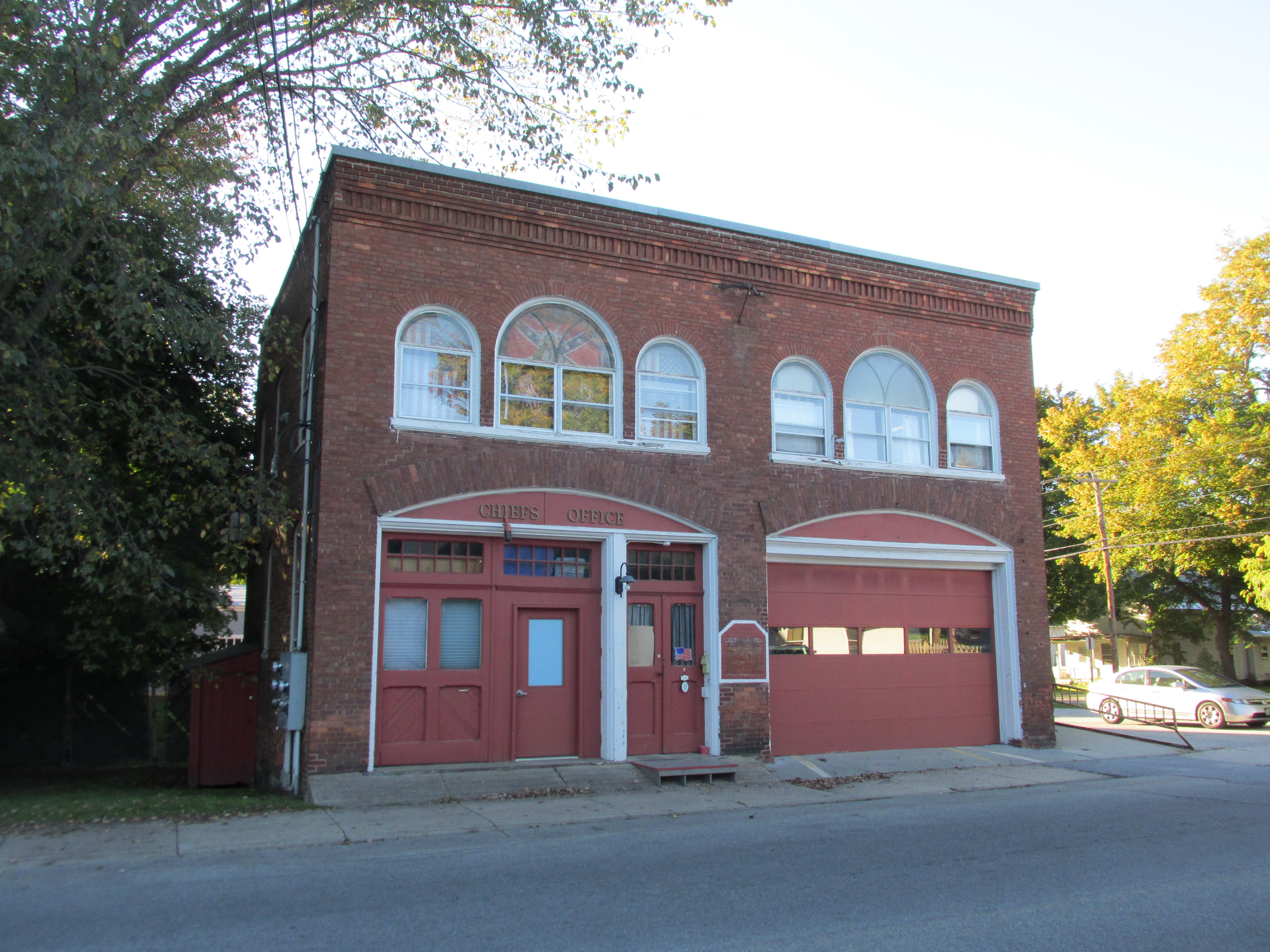

- Location within Vermont Location within the United States
- Location: 212 Safford St., Bennington, Vermont
- Coordinates: 42°52′52″N 73°11′19″W
- Area: 0.3 acres (0.12 ha)
- Built: 1894
- Architect: Russell & March
- NRHP reference No.: 99001295
- Added to NRHP: October 28, 1999

The W.H. Bradford Hook and Ladder Fire House is a historic fire station at 212 Stafford Street in Bennington, Vermont, United States. Built in 1893-94, it served for over a century as a fire house for the city, and survived modernizations with much of its historic fabric intact. It has been converted into artist studios and living space. It was listed on the National Register of Historic Places in 1999.

== Description and history ==
The Bradford Hook and Ladder Fire House is located just northeast of downtown Bennington, at the southwest corner of Safford and Gage Streets. The area is mainly residential, with a public park across the street and a manufacturing plant one block to the west. The station is built of brick, and is two stories in height. It has two equipment bays on the ground floor, one of which has an overhead door, and the other has been enclosed by a three-bay wall, with pedestrian entrances in the right two bays, and fixed windows above paneling in the leftmost bay. All three of these bays have two-level transom windows above. On the second floor above each equipment bay are three round-arch windows, with smaller windows flanking a larger one. The interior has retained a number of original finishes, including a wooden ceiling on the second floor.

The station was built in 1893-94, and originally housed the W.H. Bradford Hook Company on one side, and the F.M. Tiffany Hose Company on the other. The equipment it housed was drawn by horses, and the facility included a tower for drying hoses, which were subject to rot. The tower was demolished in 1912, replaced by a shed which was itself removed sometime after 1921. Also in the 1920s, the left-hand bay was converted to house the office of the fire chief. The station remained in active service until 1997. It has since been converted into studio and living space.

== See also ==
- National Register of Historic Places listings in Bennington County, Vermont
