= Julius and Sophia Norton House =

Historic house in Vermont, United States

- U.S. National Register of Historic Places
- Location within Vermont Location within the United States
- Location: 300 Pleasant St., Bennington, Vermont
- Coordinates: 42°52′44″N 73°11′34″W
- Area: Less than one acre
- Built: 1807
- Architectural style: Georgian
- NRHP reference No.: 100006180
- Added to NRHP: February 23, 2021

The Julius and Sophia Norton House is a historic house at 300 Pleasant Street in Bennington, Vermont. Its main block, completed in 1846, is one of the state's finest examples of Greek Revival architecture. It was listed on the National Register of Historic Places in 2021.

== Description and history ==
The Julius and Sophia Norton House is located in the town center of Bennington, at the northeast corner of Park and Pleasant Streets one block north of Main Street. It is a large two-story wood-frame structure, built in stylistically different stages. Its main block presents a prominent Greek Revival temple front to Pleasant Street, with four fluted Doric columns supported a full entablature and gabled roof end. The west side of the block, facing Park Street, also has a single-story colonnade of Greek Revival columns. Behind the main block is a second two-story block, which exhibits later Victorian-era styling.

The main block of the house was built in 1846 for Julius Norton, owner of a major local pottery factory, and his second wife Sophia. The Norton pottery was marketed as one of the largest concerns of its kind in the country, shipping wares across New England and eastern Canada. The second owner, Lyman Abbott, was the managing proprietor of a local hosiery mill. The building has since been converted into a multi-unit apartment building; significant interior features were retained during this conversion.

== See also ==
- National Register of Historic Places listings in Bennington County, Vermont
