= School Street Duplexes =

Historic house in Vermont, United States

- U.S. National Register of Historic Places
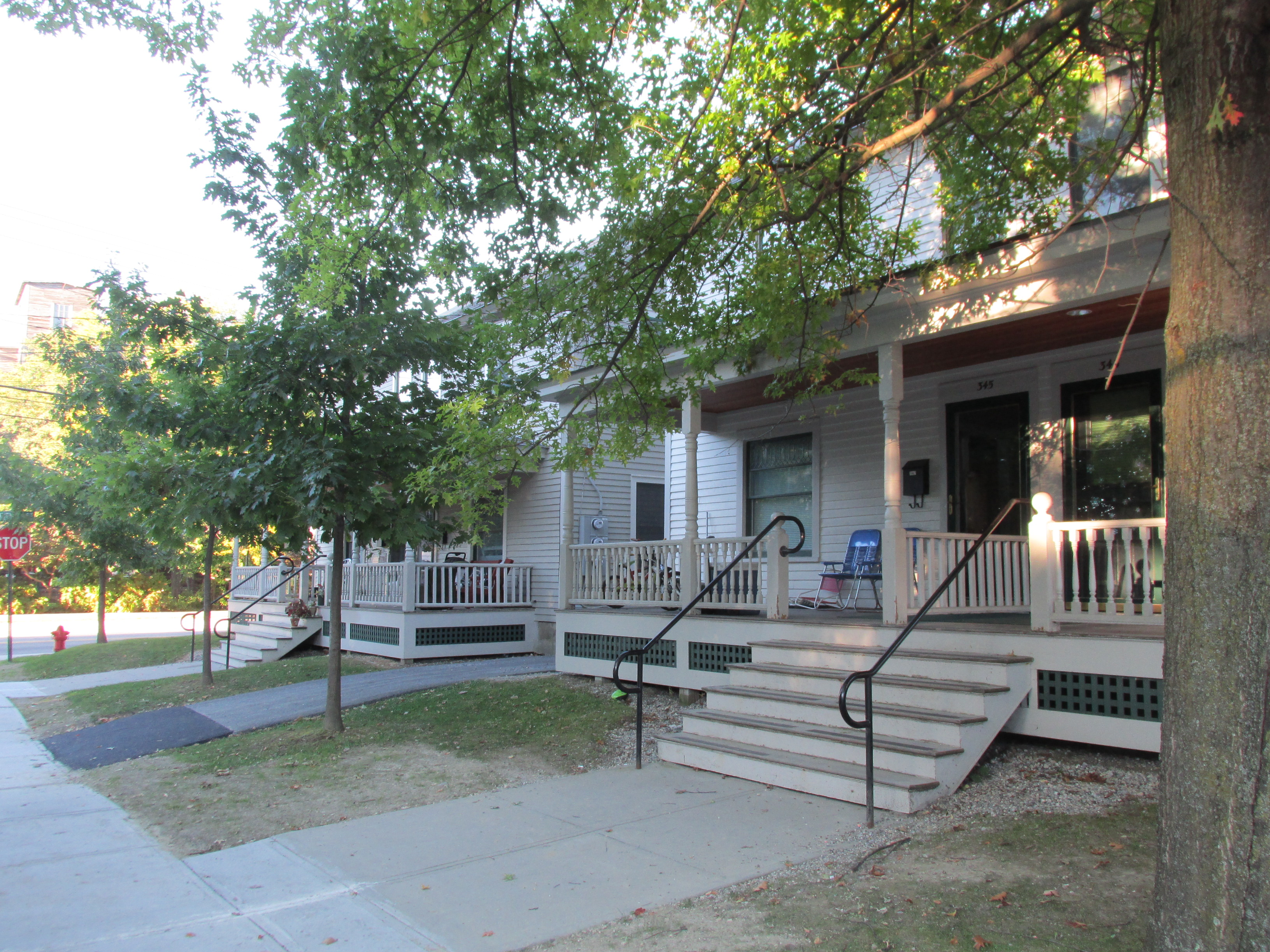

- Location within Vermont Location within the United States
- Location: 343-345 and 347-349 School St., Bennington, Vermont
- Coordinates: 42°53′3″N 73°11′40″W
- Area: 0.2 acres (0.081 ha)
- Built: 1916
- Architectural style: Queen Anne
- NRHP reference No.: 07000162
- Added to NRHP: March 13, 2007

The School Street Duplexes are a pair of historic two-family worker houses at 343-345 and 347-349 School Street in Bennington, Vermont. Built about 1916, they are well-preserved examples of typical worker housing units of the 1910s. They were listed on the National Register of Historic Places in 2007.

== Description and history ==
The School Street duplexes stand north of downtown Bennington, on the east side of School Street at its junction with County Street. The two buildings are nearly identical two-story wood-frame structures, with side gable roofs, clapboard siding, and fieldstone foundations. Their front facades are four bays wide, with entrances in the center two bays. Each has a hipped-roof single-story porch extending across the front facade, with Queen Anne style turned balustrades and posts. The interiors of both buildings retain trim and other details original to their period of construction.

These two houses were built sometime between 1916 and 1921, during a period of prosperity in Bennington that followed the First World War. They were built by two local residents as a speculative venture to provide rental housing to workers in the nearby mills (located a short walk away), and were probably identical in design as an economic measure to reduce costs. They went through only a few owners prior to their acquisition in 1990 by the Regional Affordable Housing Corporation, which rehabilitated the buildings and converted them into a four-unit condominium complex.

== See also ==
- National Register of Historic Places listings in Bennington County, Vermont
