= Amos Lawrence House =

Historic house in Vermont, United States

- U.S. National Register of Historic Places
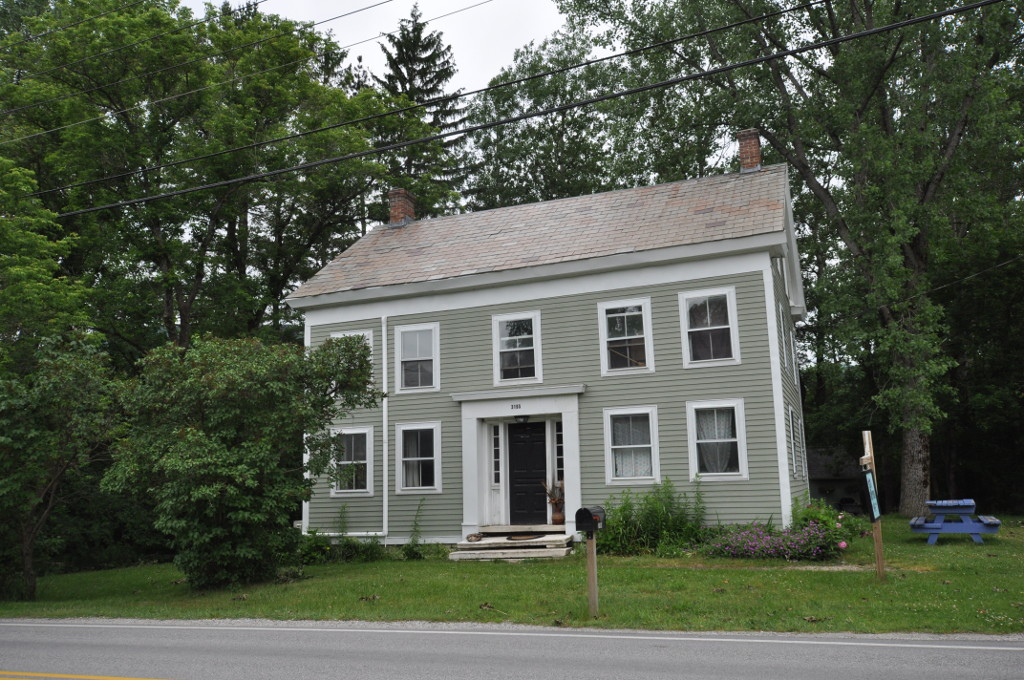

- Location within Vermont Location within the United States
- Location: Richville Rd., Manchester, Vermont
- Coordinates: 43°9′55″N 73°3′11″W
- Area: 1 acre (0.40 ha)
- Built: 1840
- Architectural style: Greek Revival
- NRHP reference No.: 85001245
- Added to NRHP: May 21, 1985

The Amos Lawrence House is a historic house on Richville Road in Manchester, Vermont, USA. Built about 1840, it is a fine local example of a Greek Revival farmhouse. Restored in the 1980s after many years as a rental property, it was listed on the National Register of Historic Places in 1985.

== Description and history ==
The Amos Lawrence House stands in central Manchester, on the east side of the Battenkill River, between railroad tracks to the west and Richville Road to the east, just south of its junction with Green Mountain Road. It is a 2 1/2-story wood-frame structure, five bays wide, with a side-gable roof, two interior brick chimneys, and clapboard siding. Its main facade faces east, and has a center entrance set in a recess with sidelight windows. The recess opening is flanked by pilasters, which support an entablature and projecting cornice. The building corners have narrow trim pieces, with a broad entablature below the eave. A 1 1/2-story ell extends to the rear of the house, and may be older than the main block.

The house was built about 1840 by Amos Lawrence, who purchased 70 acres (28 ha) of farmland here in 1826. This house was built about 1840; the ell may be Lawrence's first house. The property passed out of the Lawrence family in 1879, and was used by a succession of absentee owners as a rental property. In nearly derelict condition, the house was separated from the farmland in 1983 and given a full restoration, and now houses two living units.

== See also ==
- National Register of Historic Places listings in Bennington County, Vermont
