= Ritchie Block =

- U.S. National Register of Historic Places
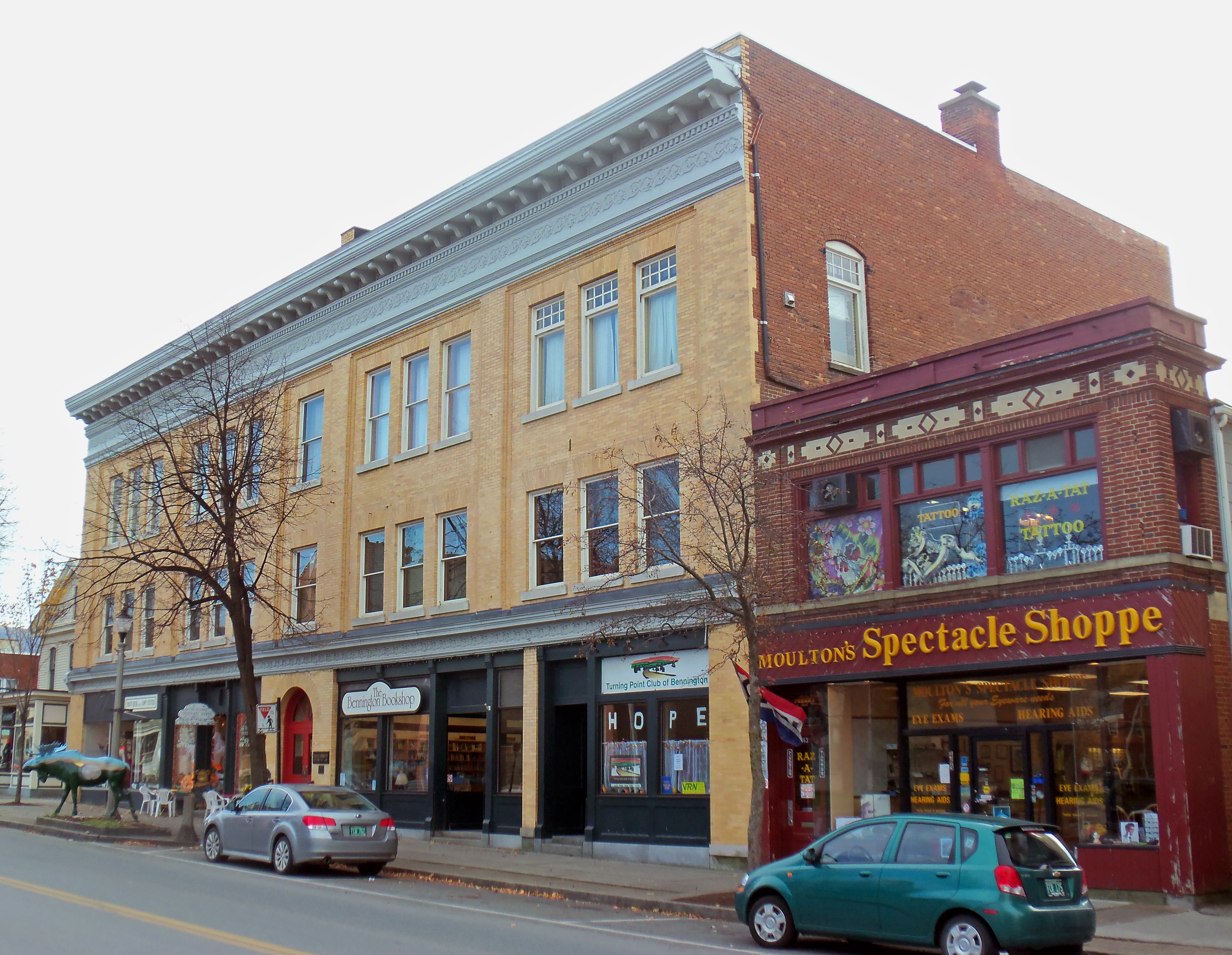

- Location within Vermont Location within the United States
- Location: 465-473 Main St., Bennington, Vermont
- Coordinates: 42°52′39″N 73°11′44″W
- Area: 0.3 acres (0.12 ha)
- Built: 1895
- NRHP reference No.: 86003060
- Added to NRHP: November 6, 1986

The Ritchie Block is a historic commercial building at 465-473 Main Street in downtown Bennington, Vermont. Built in 1895-96, it is a high quality example of Classical Revival architecture, with a distinctive pressed metal entablature. The building was listed on the National Register of Historic Places in 1986.

== Description and history ==
The Ritchie Block is a three-story yellow brick building, located on the south side of Main Street (Vermont Route 9), opposite its junction with School Street, in downtown Bennington. Its ground floor has four storefronts, each with display windows and a recessed entry, with two on either side of the main building entrance. The entrance is set in a round-arch opening, with a rounded transom window above the double door. The upper two floors are divided into five paneled sections, articulated by brick pilasters. The outer four sections each have three sash windows, while the central one, over the main entrance, has one on each level. The building is crowned by an elaborate pressed metal projecting cornice.

The block was built in 1895-96 by Alexander Keith Ritchie, a Scottish immigrant who was operating a dry goods business in Bennington's central Putnam Block. Commercial development was extending eastward along Main Street, and Ritchie had purchased the lot (with a residence on it) in 1891. The house, an impressive Greek Revival structure with temple front, was turned around and moved back in the lot, and now faces Union Street. The upper floor of Ritchie's block was designed for use by the local Masonic lodge, which occupied the space until 1911. The space was occupied through the 20th century by a succession of fraternal and social organizations, including the Elks and the American Legion.

== See also ==
- National Register of Historic Places listings in Bennington County, Vermont
