= Arlington Green Covered Bridge =

- U.S. National Register of Historic Places
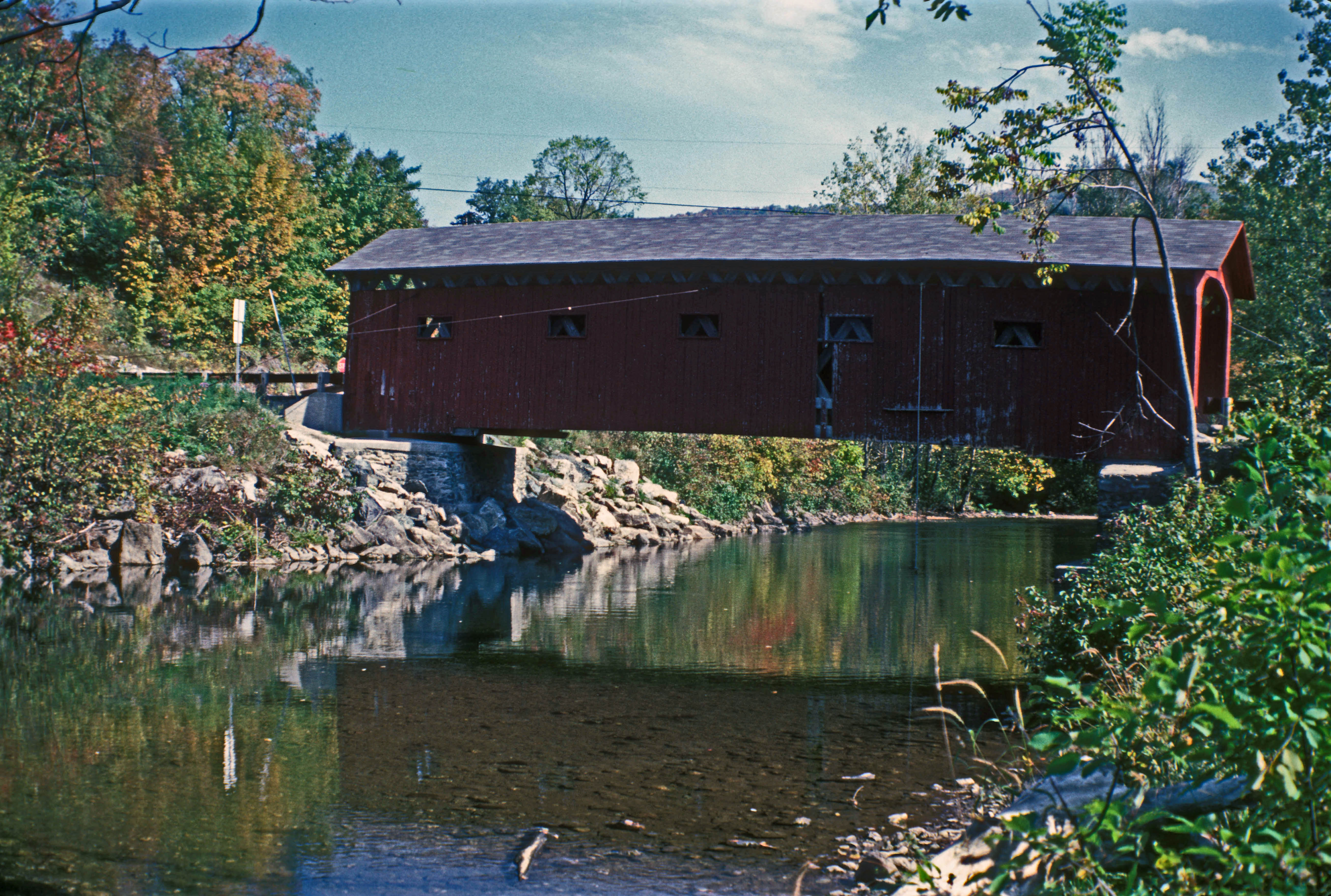

- Location within Vermont Location within the United States
- Nearest city: Arlington, Vermont
- Coordinates: 43°6′16″N 73°13′14″W
- Area: 1 acre (0.40 ha)
- Built: 1852
- Architectural style: Town lattice truss
- NRHP reference No.: 73000184
- Added to NRHP: August 28, 1973

The Arlington Green Covered Bridge is a covered bridge located off Vermont Route 313 in Arlington, Vermont. The Town lattice truss bridge carries Covered Bridge Road across Batten Kill. It was built in 1852 and was listed on the National Register of Historic Places in 1973. It is one of Vermont's oldest surviving bridges.

== Description and history ==
The Arlington Green Covered Bridge is located at the village of West Arlington, crossing Batten Kill just south of Route 313. It is a single span structure, with a length of 80 feet (24 m), a total width of 17.5 feet (5.3 m), and a roadway width of 14 feet (4.3 m) (one lane). It rests on mortared stone abutments, of which the northern one has since been faced in concrete. Guying cables are fastened near each of its corners. The sides are finished in vertical board siding, and the roof is metal. There are five small square openings in each of the sides.

The bridge was built in 1852, and is one of the state's oldest surviving covered bridges. It is also unusual in that it has not had any 20th-century strengthening elements added, a common feature to many of the state's older bridges. On August 28, 2011, the Arlington Green Covered Bridge was damaged by flooding caused by Hurricane Irene; it was fixed in the following months and reopened to traffic.

== See also ==
- List of Vermont covered bridges
- National Register of Historic Places listings in Bennington County, Vermont
- List of bridges on the National Register of Historic Places in Vermont
