= Old Bennington Post Office =

- Bennington Post Office
- U.S. National Register of Historic Places
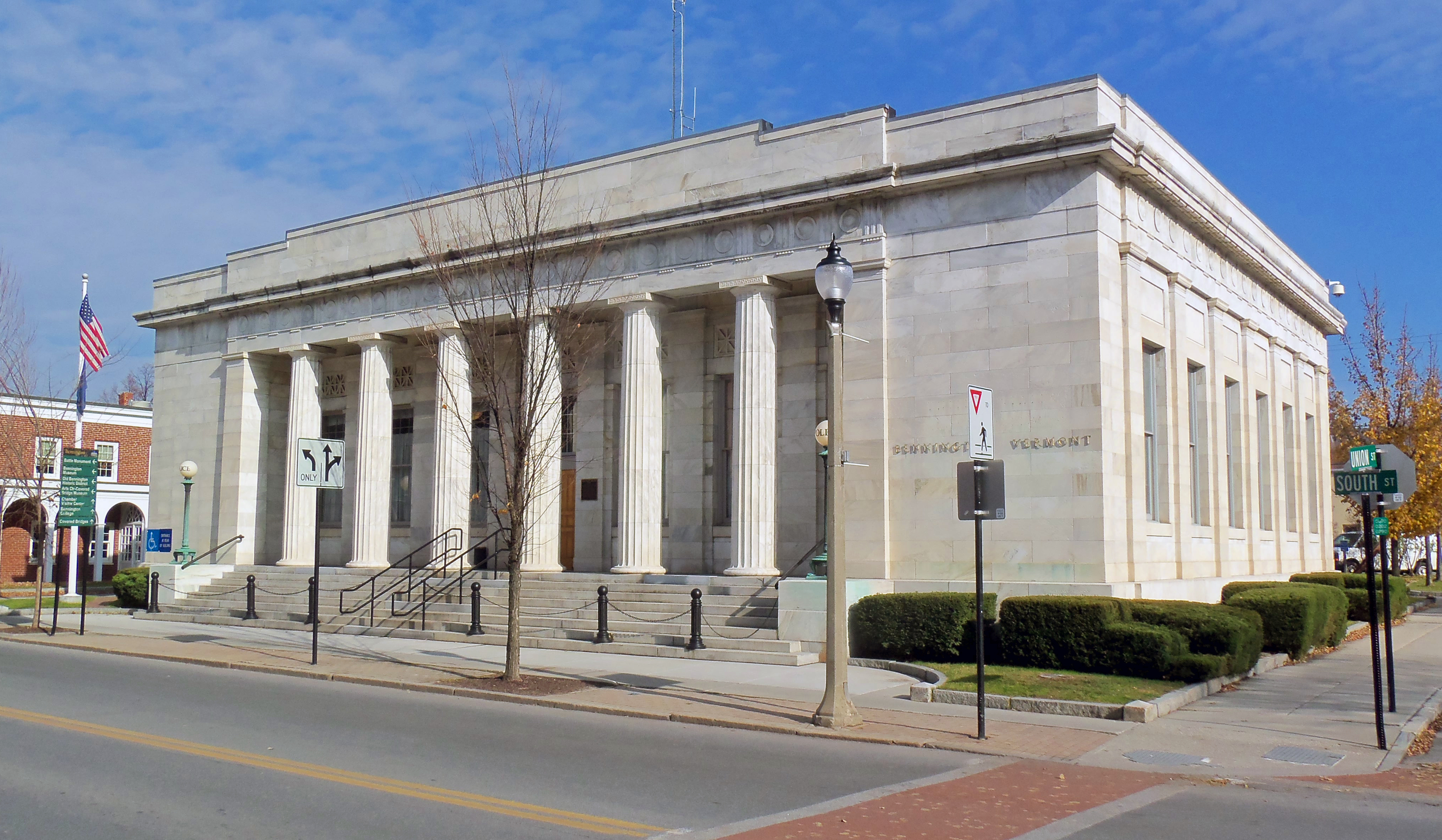
- West and south elevations, 2011

- Location within Vermont Location within the United States
- Location: 118 South St., Bennington, Vermont
- Coordinates: 42°52′39″N 73°11′49″W
- Area: less than one acre
- Built: 1914
- Architect: Taylor, James Knox
- Architectural style: Greek Revival
- NRHP reference No.: 76000137
- Added to NRHP: December 12, 1976

The Old Bennington Post Office is a historic government building at 118 South Street in Bennington, Vermont, United States. Also known at one time as the U.S. Federal Building, it is a Greek Revival building built in 1914, and now houses the Bennington Police Department. It was listed on the National Register of Historic Places in 1976 for its architecture.

== Description and history ==
The Old Bennington Post Office is located in downtown Bennington, at the northeast corner of Union and South Streets (United States Route 7). It is a single story masonry structure, set on a raised basement, its walls structurally built out of concrete and brick, and faced in Vermont marble. The main facade, facing South Street, is nine bays wide, with a recessed entry area that is defined by six large fluted Doric columns and flanking square corner pilasters. Similar square pilasters articulate the bays at the rear of the recess. The building is topped by entablatures, one adorned with Roman patterns, with a cornice and broad parapet above. The south facade, facing Union Street, has six window bays, also articulated by pilasters.

The post office was built in 1914, and was one of the last works prepared by the Office of the Supervising Architect of the United States Treasury Department during the tenure of James Knox Taylor. It served as a post office until 1967, at which time its interior was gutted and converted into federal government offices. It now houses the Bennington Police Department.

== See also ==
- National Register of Historic Places listings in Bennington County, Vermont
