= Holden–Leonard Mill Complex =

- U.S. National Register of Historic Places
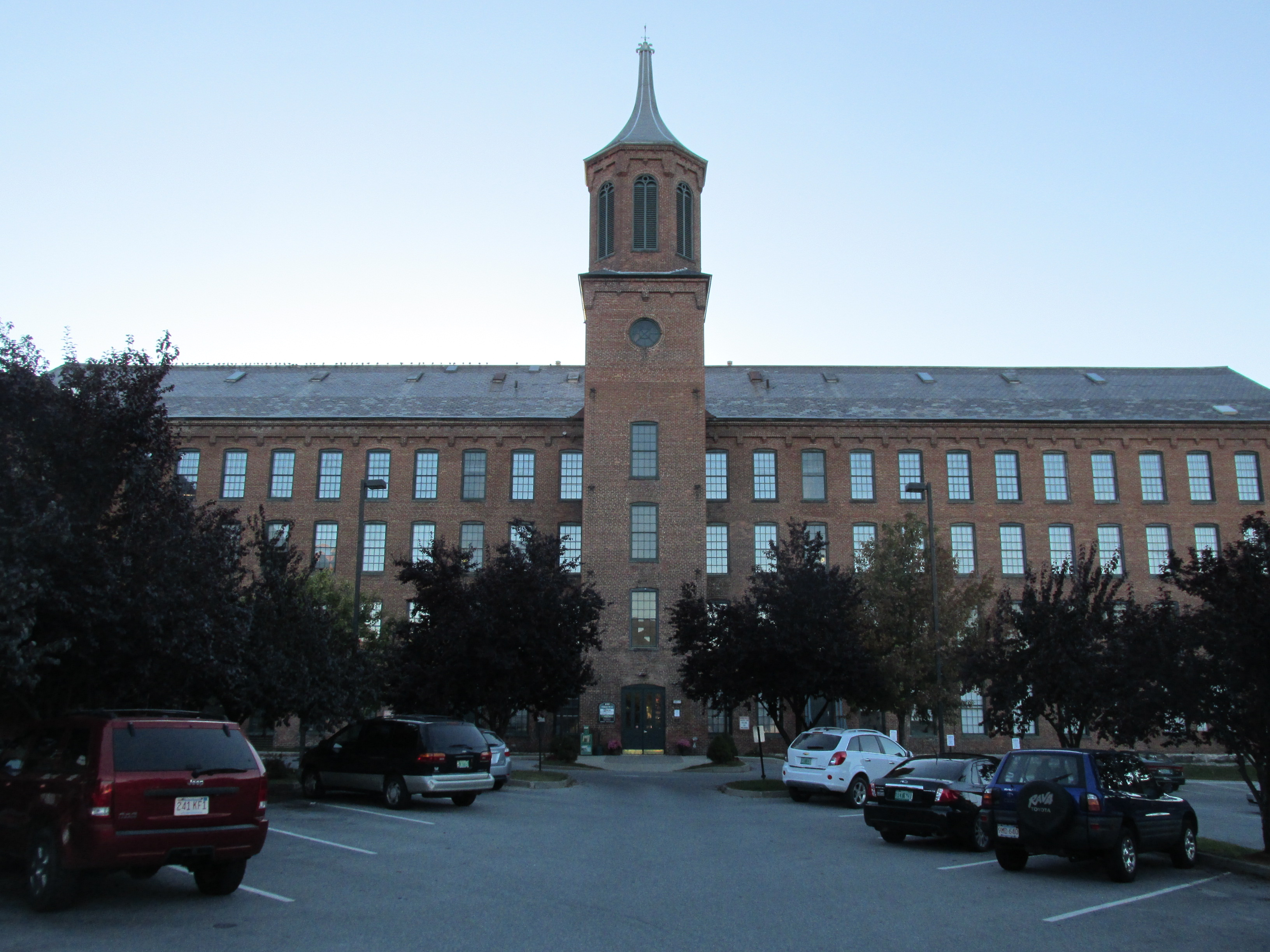

- Location within Vermont Location within the United States
- Location: 160 Benmont Ave., Bennington, Vermont
- Coordinates: 42°53′6″N 73°12′13″W
- Area: 14 acres (5.7 ha)
- Built: 1865
- NRHP reference No.: 88002085
- Added to NRHP: November 14, 1988

The Holden–Leonard Mill Complex, also known colloquially as the Big Mill and now as Vermont Mill Properties, is a historic industrial complex at 160 Benmont Avenue in Bennington, Vermont. Built of many parts between about 1865 and 1925, it is one of the largest and most architecturally distinctive 19th-century mill complexes in the state, and was a major regional employer for many years. Now redeveloped into a variety of commercial and industrial uses, it was listed on the National Register of Historic Places in 1988.

== Description and history ==
The Holden–Leonard Mill is located northwest of downtown Bennington, on the eastern bank of the Walloomsac River, bounded by Holden and Leonard Streets to the north and south, and Benmont Avenue to the east. The complex includes 28 buildings, many of them connected into a single large structure. The dominant feature of the complex is the so-called "Big Mill", also known as Building 5, which was the main structure built when the mill was founded in 1865. It is a large 4 1/2-story brick structure, 227 feet (69 m) wide and 53 feet (16 m) deep, with a six-stage tower projecting from its center. It is topped by an octagonal louvered belfry and concave flared roof. The building's basement houses a part of the original penstock that was used to regulate the water that powered the mill's machinery.

Textile development began in Bennington on an industrial scale after the railroad arrived in the early 1850s, with the production of knitwear. The Big Mill was built in 1865 by Seth Hunt and Philip Tillinghast. They produced paisley women's shawls, a product that turned out to not be popular. In 1875, the building was taken over by the Bennington Woolen Company, which produced material for overcoats. Under its aegis and that of successive owners, the plant was significantly enlarged. Its greatest period of growth followed the First World War, during which the facility produced large amounts of cloth for the war effort. By 1920 the Holden–Leonard Company was the largest employer in the region, with about 800 workers. The mill closed due to the effects of the Great Depression, and was operated for about 10 years for knit goods manufacturing. It has since seen a variety of smaller-scale uses.

== See also ==
- National Register of Historic Places listings in Bennington County, Vermont
