= Cora B. Whitney School =

- U.S. National Register of Historic Places
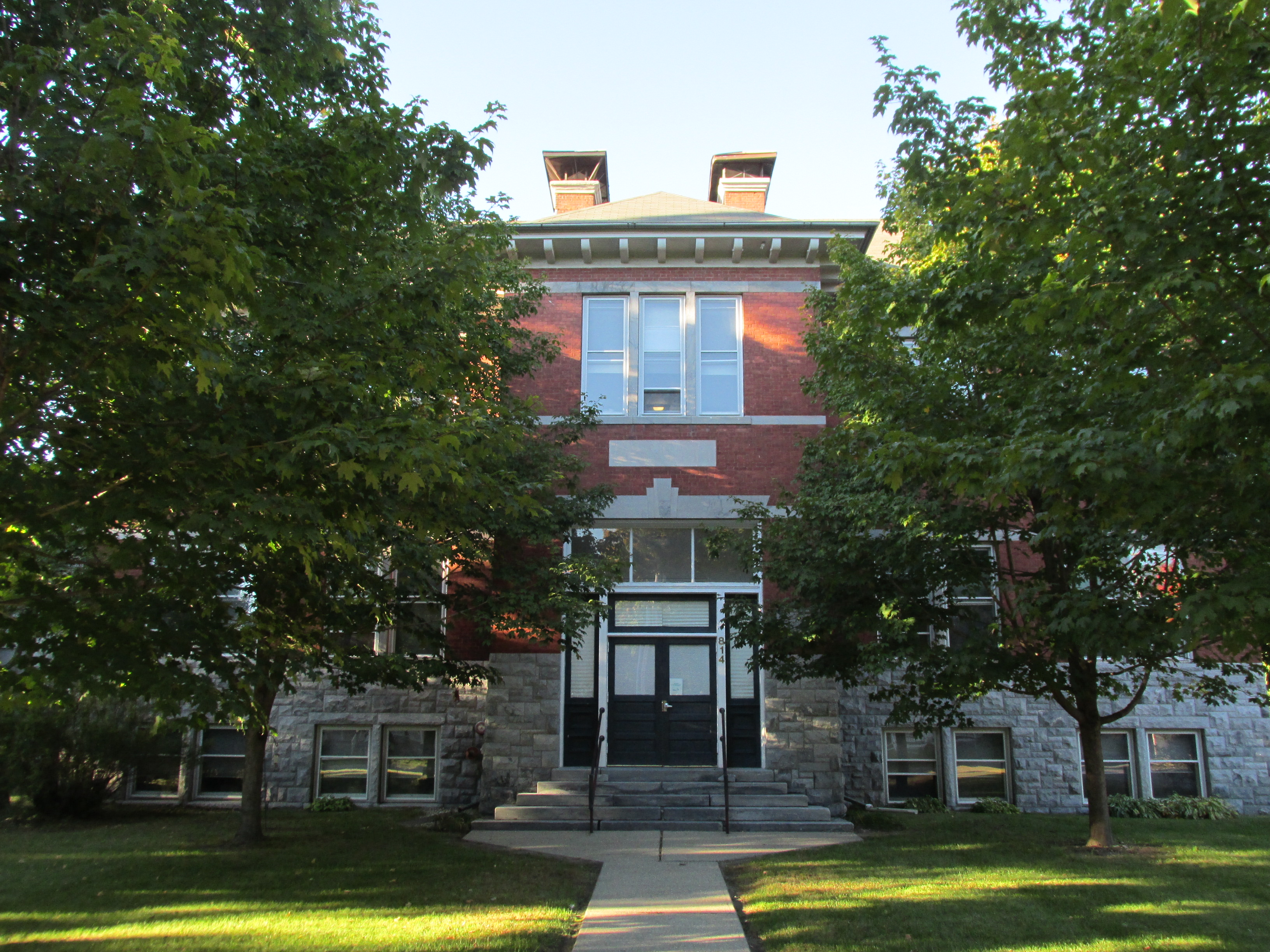

- Location within Vermont Location within the United States
- Location: 814 Gage St., Bennington, Vermont
- Coordinates: 42°52′53″N 73°10′59″W
- Area: 1.8 acres (0.73 ha)
- Built: 1897
- Architectural style: Colonial Revival
- MPS: Educational Resources of Vermont MPS
- NRHP reference No.: 01001237
- Added to NRHP: November 19, 2001

The Cora B. Whitney School is a historic former school building at 814 Gage Street in Bennington, Vermont, United States. Built in 1897, it served as one of the town's primary schools until 1994, and was converted into senior housing in 1999. It is architecturally an important early local example of Colonial Revival architecture, and was listed on the National Register of Historic Places in 2001.

== Description and history ==
The Cora B. Whitney School stands in a residential area northeast of downtown Bennington, on the north side of Gage Street, between Bradford and Branch Streets. It is a two-story brick building, set on a high marble foundation, with marble trim and a tall hip roof. The foundation is made of rough-cut coursed marble, and rises to the base of the first floor windows. The main entrance, set at the center of the south-facing front facade in a projecting section, is set midway on the height of the basement, and is accessed by a flight of stairs. Marble stringcourses join the lintels of the first-floor windows, and also the sills and lintels of the second-floor windows. The cornice of the deeply overhanging roof features exposed rafter ends and brick courses painted to resemble fascia boards.

The town of Bennington was the third in the state to consolidate its district schools, doing so in 1870. Classes for all grades were originally held in a single school building near downtown (no longer standing). This school was built in 1897 in order handle increasing enrollments, and was originally called the Seventh Ward School. It was later named for Cora Belle Whitney (1866-1918), one of its first teachers and a long-time principal. The school was doubled in size in 1957 with an addition to the rear, and was closed in 1994 after it was determined it would be too expensive to upgrade the building to current state standards. In 1999 it was converted into an independent senior living facility.

== See also ==
- National Register of Historic Places listings in Bennington County, Vermont
