= Shaftsbury Center, Vermont =

- Unincorporated village
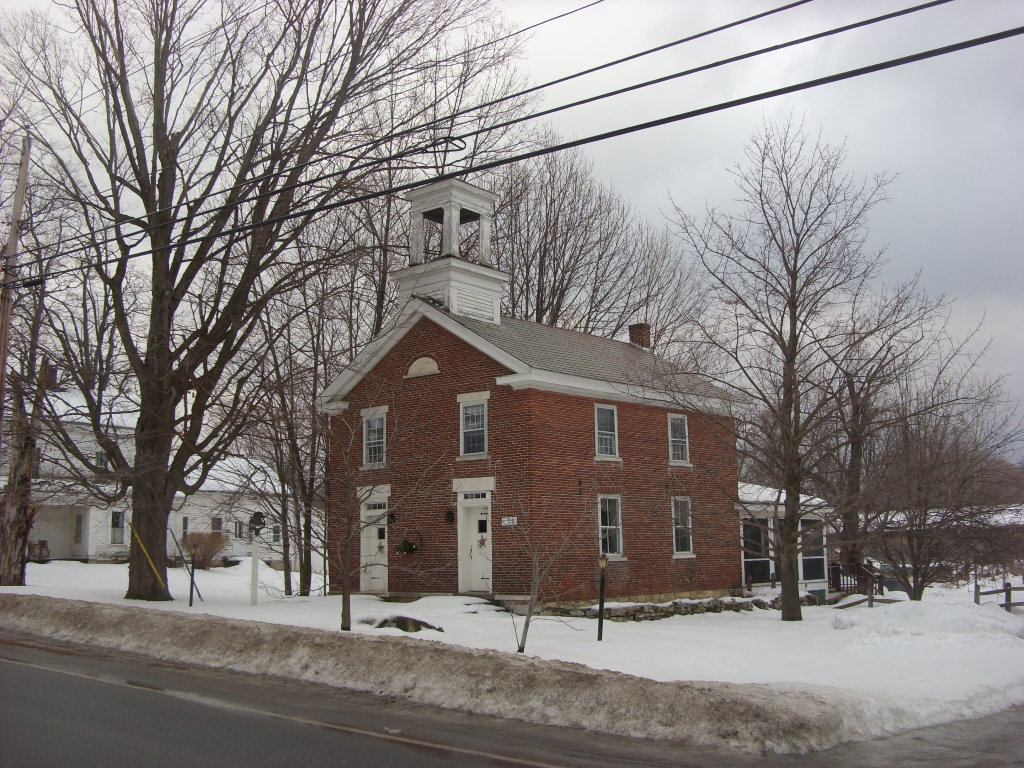

- Location within Vermont
- Coordinates: 42°59′5″N 73°12′42″W
- Country: United States
- State: Vermont
- County: Bennington
- Town: Shaftsbury

Area
  - Total: 2.2 sq mi (5.8 km^{2})
  - Land: 2.2 sq mi (5.8 km^{2})
  - Water: 0 sq mi (0.0 km^{2})
- Time zone: UTC-5 (Eastern (EST))
  - Summer (DST): UTC-4 (EDT)
- ZIP code: 05262
- Area code: 802
- Center Shaftsbury Historic District
- U.S. National Register of Historic Places
- U.S. Historic district
- Location within Vermont Location within the United States
- Location: VT 7A, Shaftsbury, Vermont
- Area: 260 acres (110 ha)
- Architect: Huntington, Harlow
- Architectural style: Greek Revival, Federal, Cape Cod
- NRHP reference No.: 88002052
- Added to NRHP: November 9, 1988

Shaftsbury Center is an unincorporated village in the town of Shaftsbury in Bennington County, Vermont, United States. Located on Vermont Route 7A at West Mountain and Tunic Roads, near the town's geographic center, it was the town's main civic center through the middle of the 19th century. It is now a modest village with agricultural and tourist-oriented economic interests. Most of the village is listed on the National Register of Historic Places as the Center Shaftsbury Historic District.

== Geography ==
Shaftsbury Center is located near the geographic center of the town of Shaftsbury, stretched out for about 1 mile (1.6 km) along Vermont Route 7A on either side of its junctions with West Mountain and Tunic Roads. The road runs on the eastern flank of the Taconic Range, and offers fine views across the valley to the Green Mountains further east.

== History ==
The town of Shaftsbury was chartered in 1761 by Benning Wentworth, the colonial governor of New Hampshire, who laid claim (along with the neighboring Province of New York) to the area that is now Vermont. The dispute over the status of Vermont (then sometimes called the New Hampshire Grants) would ultimately lead to its independence in 1777, and its eventual statehood as the 14th state. Part of the history of those events was played out in Shaftsbury Center, where the inn of Jonas Galusha, an eventual Governor of Vermont, was a meeting point for both those events, and the participation of Vermont men in the American Revolutionary War. Shaftsbury also sheltered rebels involved Shays' Rebellion (1786–87) in Massachusetts.

As the town's civic center, it housed its first church and town meetinghouse. It developed as a predominantly agrarian community in the 19th century, but was bypassed by the railroad when it was laid through the town in 1850. This resulted a shift of economic and civic activity to South Shaftsbury, where a new town hall was built in 1880. Shaftsbury Center declined economically until the early 20th century, when the advent of automobile-propelled tourism brought new economic activity.

Most of the village's buildings were built before 1880, and its oldest house, the 1764-5 Abiathar Waldo House, was built by one of its first settlers. Most of the village was listed on the National Register of Historic Places as a historic district in 1988.

== See also ==
- National Register of Historic Places listings in Bennington County, Vermont
