= Whitney High School =

Whitney High School can refer to:

- Whitney High School (Cerritos, California)
- Whitney High School (Rocklin, California)
- Whitney High School (Texas) in Whitney, Texas
- Whitney High School (Toledo, Ohio), closed in 1991
