= State Route 313 (New York–Vermont) =

Highway in Vermont and New York, United States

Route 313
- Route 313 highlighted in red

Route information
- Maintained by NYSDOT (NY 313) and VTrans (VT 313)
- Length: 19.01 mi (30.59 km): NY 313: 8.96 mi (14.42 km); VT 313: 10.050 mi (16.174 km)
- History: NY 313 assigned 1930; VT 313 assigned late 1930s; originally designated VT 123 c. 1934

Major junctions
- West end: NY 22 in Cambridge, NY
- VT 7A in Sunderland, VT
- East end: US 7 in Arlington, VT

Location
- Country: United States
- State: New York
- Counties: Washington (NY), Bennington (VT)

Highway system
- New York Highways; Interstate; US; State; Reference; Parkways
- New York Highways; Interstate; US; State; Reference; Parkways
- State highways in Vermont
← NY 312	New York	→ NY 314
← US 302	Vermont	→ VT 314

New York State Route 313 (NY 313) and Vermont Route 313 (VT 313) are a pair of like-numbered state highways in New York and Vermont in the United States, that meet at the state line. NY 313 extends for 8.96 miles (14.42 km) through the Washington County town of Salem from New York State Route 22 (NY 22) in Cambridge. Its Vermont counterpart is a 10.050-mile (16.174 km) connection to U.S. Route 7 (US 7) through the Bennington County town Arlington.

NY 313 was assigned as part of the 1930 renumbering of state highways in New York. The Vermont counterpart was first designated as Vermont Route 123 (VT 123) in 1935. Three years later, VT 123 was absorbed into an extension of VT 11. By 1940, VT 313 had been designated and was concurrent with VT 11, but between 1947 and 1952, VT 11 was truncated to Manchester.

== Route description ==
=== NY 313 ===
NY 313 begins at an intersection with NY 22 (South Park Street) at the southern end of the village of Cambridge. NY 313 proceeds northeast from NY 22 along Gilbert Street, as a two-lane asphalt commercial/residential street. Bypassing the village's downtown, the route enters the eastern sections of Cambridge, crossing an intersection with County Route 67 (CR 67; East Main Street). At this intersection, NY 313 changes names from Gilbert Street to Maple Avenue, continuing northeast through Cambridge until just north of Spring Street, where the route crosses into the town of Cambridge.

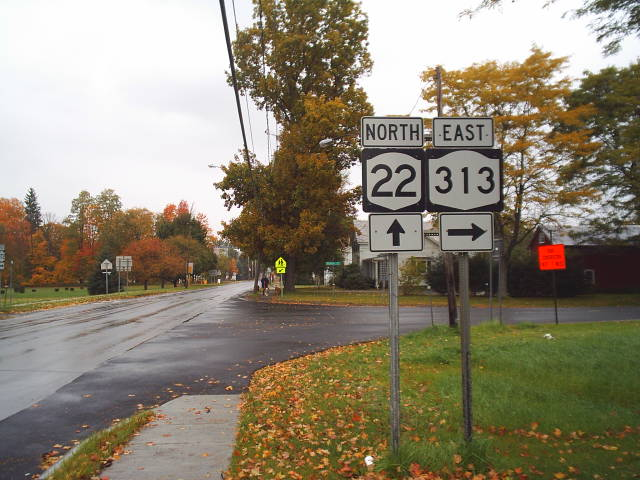
NY 313's western terminus at an intersection with NY 22 in the village of Cambridge

Now loose of the name Maple Avenue, NY 313 winds northeast through the town of Cambridge, becoming a two-lane farm road, entering the town of White Creek. Continuing the same progression through White Creek, NY 313 soon leaves White Creek for the town of Jackson. In Jackson, the route bends further to the northeast after it intersects with Plains Road. Now in the hamlet of The Plains, NY 313 crosses along the base of Peaked Rock, crawling through farms in Jackson. After several bends, the route joins a parallel of the Batten Kill, remaining a rural two-lane roadway. After another bend, NY 313 enters the hamlet of Anaquassacook, which consists of several houses on both sides of the roadway. Now running alongside the Batten Kill, NY 313 enters the town of Salem for a short distance before crossing back into Jackson.

NY 313 continues northeast through Jackson as a two-lane farm road, crossing an intersection with the eastern terminus of CR 61. At CR 61, the route bends eastward along the Batten Kill, crossing it near an intersection with Hickory Hill Road. Continuing the parallel, NY 313 bends northward then eastward back into Salem. Just after the town line, NY 313 reaches the New York–Vermont state line, where the NY 313 designation terminates. The right-of-way continues east through Bennington County towards US 7 as VT 313 (Batten Kill Drive).

=== VT 313 ===
Paralleling the Batten Kill, NY 313 enters Vermont and becomes VT 313. The highway crosses the border in a low-level valley, passing through the areas of clearings and woodlands. The route progresses to the southeast, passing a few residences. There is a turn to the east, then north, then back to the east in progression. At the intersection with Covered Bridge Road, VT 313 enters West Arlington, Vermont, which is slightly more developed than the area surrounding it. In West Arlington, VT 313 makes a dive to the south in direction. Passing through a relatively stable environment of woodlands and clearings, the highway begins to turn to the southeast again. After a couple of turns, VT 313 passes the Arlington Recreational Park, and enters the town of Arlington, Vermont.

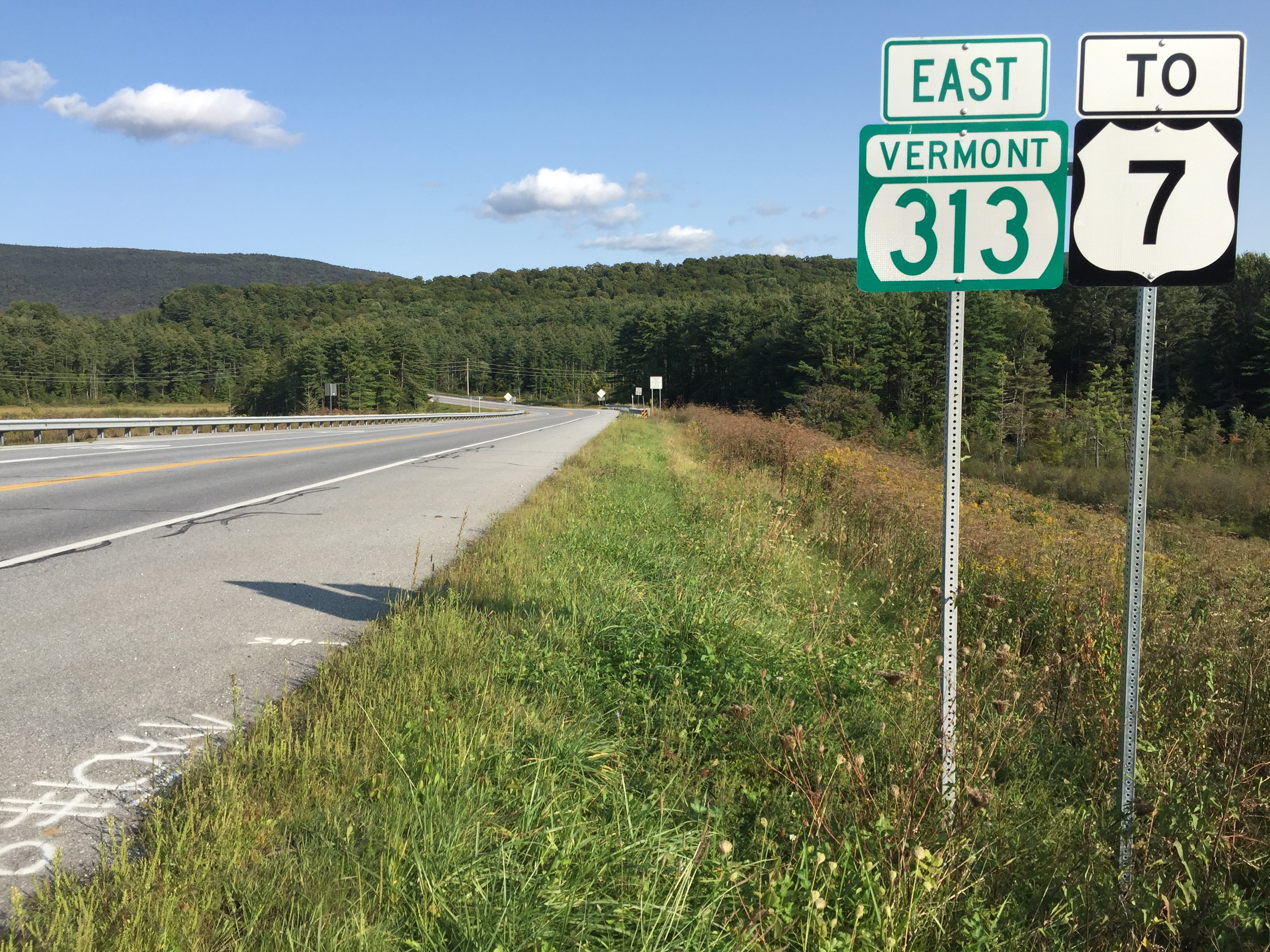
View east along VT 313 between Historic VT 7A and US 7 in Arlington

In Arlington, VT 7A (the Ethan Allen Highway) intersects and becomes concurrent with VT 313. The two highways turn to the south and head through downtown Arlington. East Arlington Road intersects and begins to parallel the highways as they progress southward. In the community of East Arlington, VT 313 and VT 7A split, heading to the east and south respectively. VT 313 then begins its final stretch of highway, heading through woodlands once again, and reaching its final intersection, which is with South Road. After that, VT 313 terminates at an interchange with US 7 in East Arlington. The right-of-way for VT 313 continues after the interchange to a dead end as Orvis Road.

== History ==
NY 313 was assigned to its current alignment as part of the 1930 renumbering of state highways in New York. There was initially no matching route on the Vermont side of the highway; however, the east–west highway connecting U.S. Route 7 (now VT 7A) in Arlington to New York State Route 313 at the New York state line was added to the Vermont state highway system as part of the 1935 state highway system expansion and initially designated as VT 123. The route became part of VT 11 by 1938, which was then co-designated as VT 313 from New York to Arlington by 1940. VT 11 was truncated to Manchester between 1947 and 1952, leaving only the VT 313 designation on the New York – Arlington highway. In the late 1970s, US 7 was realigned onto a new limited-access highway through most of southwestern Vermont. The new highway bypassed Arlington to the east. In 1978, VT 313 was extended eastward by way of VT 7A and a new roadway to meet the new routing of US 7.

== Major intersections ==
State	County	Location	mi	km	Destinations	Notes
New York	Washington	Village of Cambridge	0.00	0.00	NY 22 (South Park Street) – Salem, Hoosick Falls	Western terminus of NY 313
New York–Vermont state line			8.96 0.000	14.42 0.000	Route transition	
Vermont	Bennington	Arlington	6.634	10.676	VT 7A north – Manchester	Western end of VT 7A concurrency; former US 7 north
Vermont	Bennington	Arlington	8.059	12.970	VT 7A south – Shaftsbury	Eastern end of VT 7A concurrency; former US 7 south
Vermont	Bennington	Sunderland	9.864– 10.050	15.875– 16.174	US 7 – Manchester, Rutland, Bennington	Eastern terminus of VT 313; diamond interchange; exit 3 on US 7
1.000 mi = 1.609 km; 1.000 km = 0.621 mi: Concurrency terminus

== See also ==
- State Route 74 (New York–Vermont)
- State Route 314 (New York–Vermont)
- State Route 346 (New York–Vermont)
