= Bennington, Vermont (disambiguation) =

Bennington, Vermont is a town in Southeastern Vermont. It is the sixth-largest municipality in the state.

Bennington, Vermont may also refer to several places:

- Old Bennington, Vermont, a historic village located within the town of Bennington
- Bennington County, Vermont, a county in Southeastern Vermont
- North Bennington, Vermont, a village located within the town of Bennington
- Bennington (CDP), Vermont, the census-designated place that makes up downtown Bennington
