= Vermont Route 279 =

State highway in Bennington County, Vermont, US

Vermont Route 279
- Bennington Bypass
- Map of Bennington and vicinity with VT 279 highlighted in red.

Route information
- Maintained by VTrans
- Length: 6.716 mi (10.808 km)
- Existed: October 12, 2004–present

Major junctions
- West end: NY 915G at the New York state line near Hoosick, NY
- VT 67A in Bennington; US 7 in Bennington
- East end: VT 9 in Bennington

Location
- Country: United States
- State: Vermont
- Counties: Bennington

Highway system
- State highways in Vermont
← VT 253	→ VT 289

Vermont Route 279 (VT 279), often referred to as the Bennington Bypass, is a freeway bypass of Bennington in Bennington County, Vermont, in the United States. It extends for roughly 6.7 miles (10.8 km) from the New York state line northwest of Bennington to an intersection with VT 9 east of the downtown district. At its west end, VT 279 connects to New York State Route 915G (NY 915G), an unsigned reference route leading to New York State Route 7 (NY 7) in Hoosick, New York.

The section of VT 279 west of U.S. Route 7 (US 7) officially opened to traffic in 2004; however, portions of the route have been open in some capacity since the 1970s. An extension of VT 279 southeast to VT 9 was completed in 2012.

== Route description ==
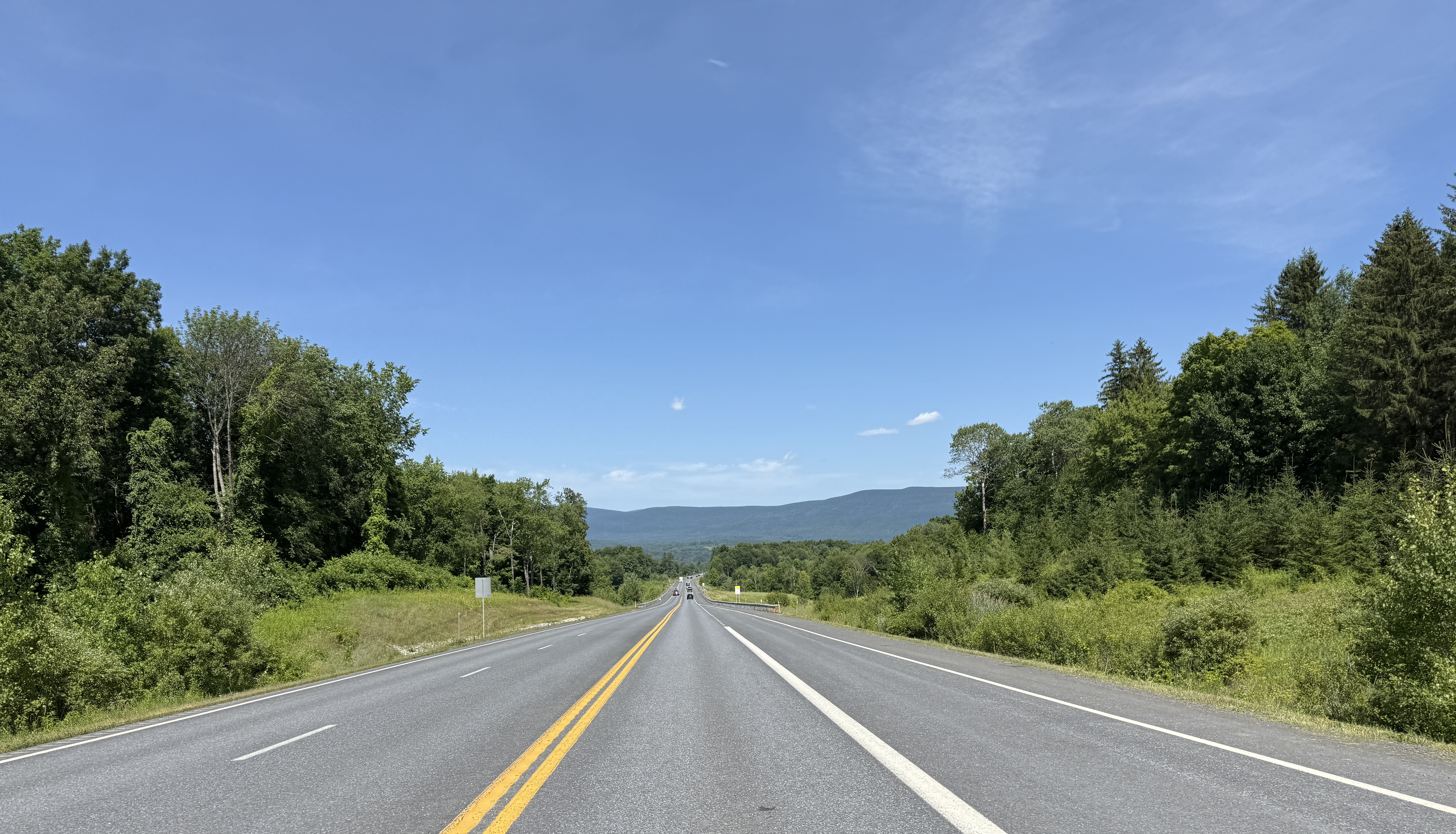
VT 279 eastbound past New York border

VT 279 begins at the New York–Vermont state line, where the road continues west to NY 7 in Hoosick, New York, as NY 915G, a reference route signed as "To VT 279" eastbound and "To NY 7" westbound. As VT 279, the highway heads northeast from the state line, passing through rural northwest Bennington as a three-lane road. It bypasses William H. Morse State Airport to the north and passes over a pair of local roadways on its way toward downtown Bennington, where the route crosses the Walloomsac River and meets VT 67A at a parclo interchange north of downtown.

Past VT 67A, the bypass widens to four lanes and becomes a divided highway as it passes over VT 7A and approaches a complex interchange with US 7. The route briefly overlaps with the freeway before continuing eastward as a two-lane highway toward the western edge of Green Mountain National Forest. After 1 mile (1.6 km), VT 279 turns southward, loosely paralleling the forest's west boundary as it bypasses the northeastern section of downtown Bennington. The route crosses the Roaring Branch of the Walloomsac River before ending at a half-completed single-point urban interchange (SPUI) with VT 9 east of downtown.

== History ==
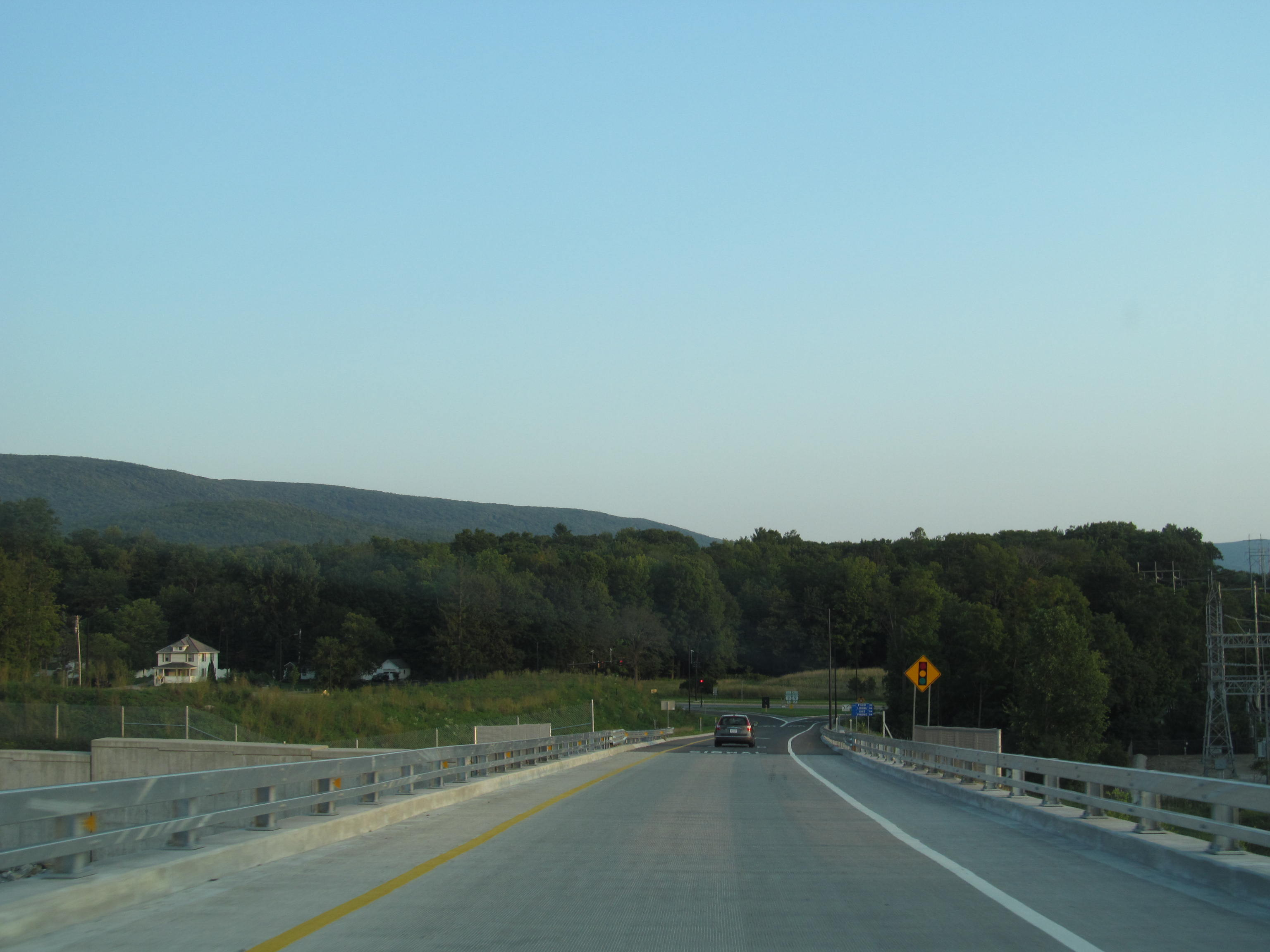
Approaching VT 9 on VT 279 eastbound

The four-lane portion of VT 279 between VT 67A and US 7 was built in the early 1970s and designated VT 67A Connector in 1974. However, construction did not begin on the remainder of the route west of VT 67A (including the short continuation into Hoosick, New York) until the early 2000s. Work on the bypass concluded with the opening of VT 279 on October 12, 2004. The number "279" was chosen because it provides a bypass for both US 7 and VT 9.

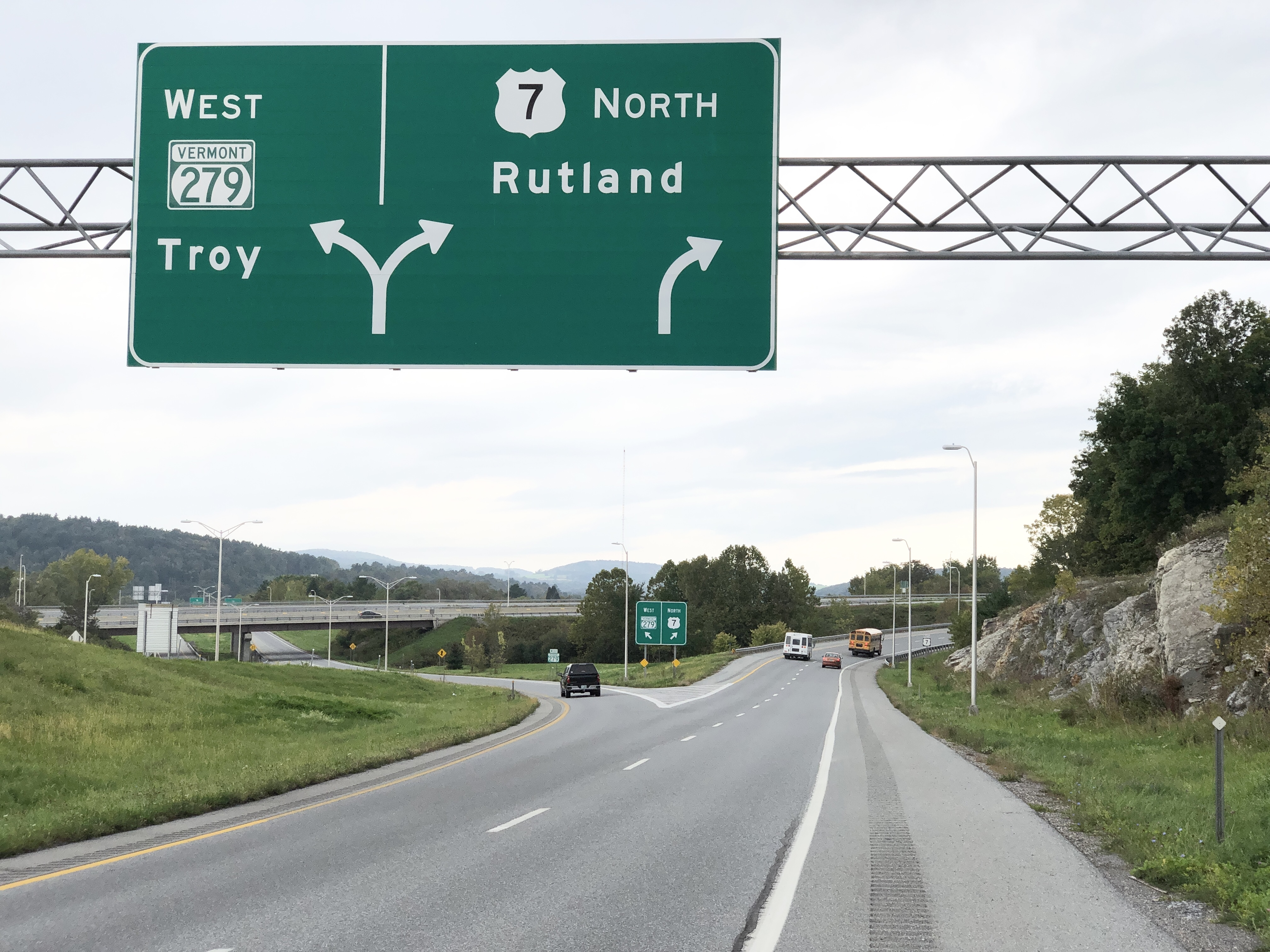
Split of US 7 northbound and VT 279 westbound in Bennington

Construction on an extension of VT 279 southeast to VT 9 began in July 2007. The highway was built as a two-lane undivided roadway, similar to that constructed between Hoosick and Bennington. It was officially opened on August 30, 2012, and cost roughly $70 million to build. Construction plans for the northern segment called for the existing interchange between US 7 and VT 279 to be reconfigured to accommodate a welcome center located within the exit that was completed and officially opened on October 11, 2013.

== Exit list ==
This list includes VT 279's continuation into New York as NY 915G. All exits are unnumbered.

County	Location	mi	km	Destinations	Notes
Rensselaer	Hoosick	0.00	0.00	NY 7 to VT 9 – Troy, Bennington VT, Brattleboro VT	Western terminus of NY 915G; at-grade intersection
New York–Vermont state line		1.19 0.000	1.92 0.000	NY 915G becomes VT 279	
Bennington	Bennington	3.228	5.195	VT 67A (North Bennington Road) to VT 7A – Bennington, North Bennington	Partial cloverleaf interchange
Bennington	Bennington	3.841– 4.066	6.181– 6.544	US 7 – Downtown Bennington, Rutland, Welcome Center	Exit 1 on US 7
Bennington	Bennington	6.716	10.808	VT 9 (Molly Stark Trail) – Brattleboro, Bennington	Eastern terminus of VT 279; partial single-point urban interchange
1.000 mi = 1.609 km; 1.000 km = 0.621 mi: Route transition

== See also ==
- List of reference routes in New York
