= Vermont Route 7A =

State highway in Bennington County, Vermont, US

Vermont Route 7A
- Korean Veterans Memorial Highway
- VT 7A highlighted in red

Route information
- Maintained by VTrans
- Length: 27.820 mi (44.772 km)

Major junctions
- South end: US 7 in Bennington
- North end: US 7 in Dorset

Location
- Country: United States
- State: Vermont
- Counties: Bennington

Highway system
- State highways in Vermont
← US 7	→ VT 8

Vermont Route 7A (VT 7A) is a 27.8-mile-long (44.7 km) north–south state highway in Bennington County, Vermont, in the United States. It is an alternate route of U.S. Route 7 (US 7) between Bennington and Dorset. The route is signed as "Historic VT 7A" to distinguish it, the original routing of US 7, from the modern US 7 freeway.

== Route description ==
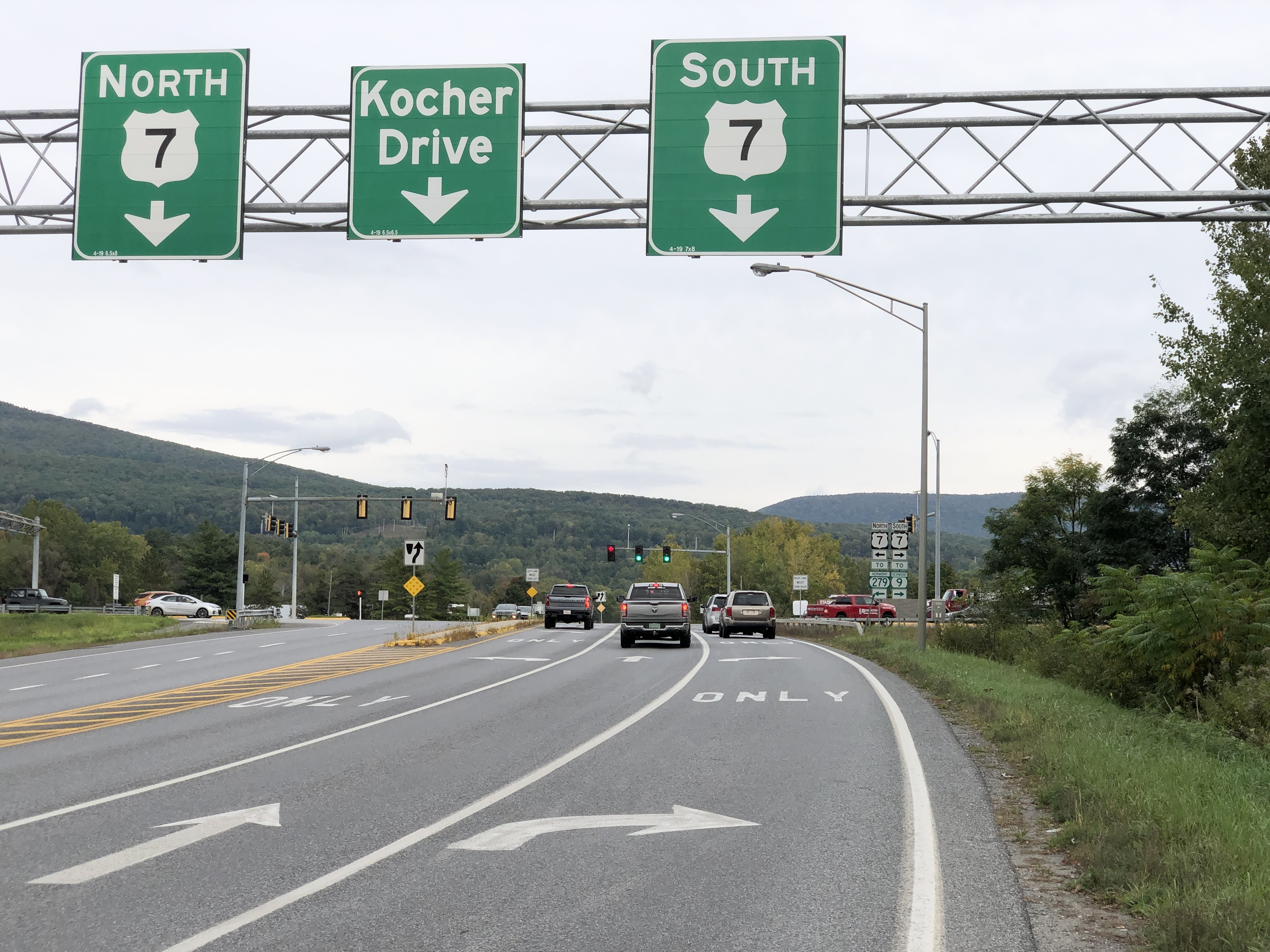
View south along VT 7A in Bennington

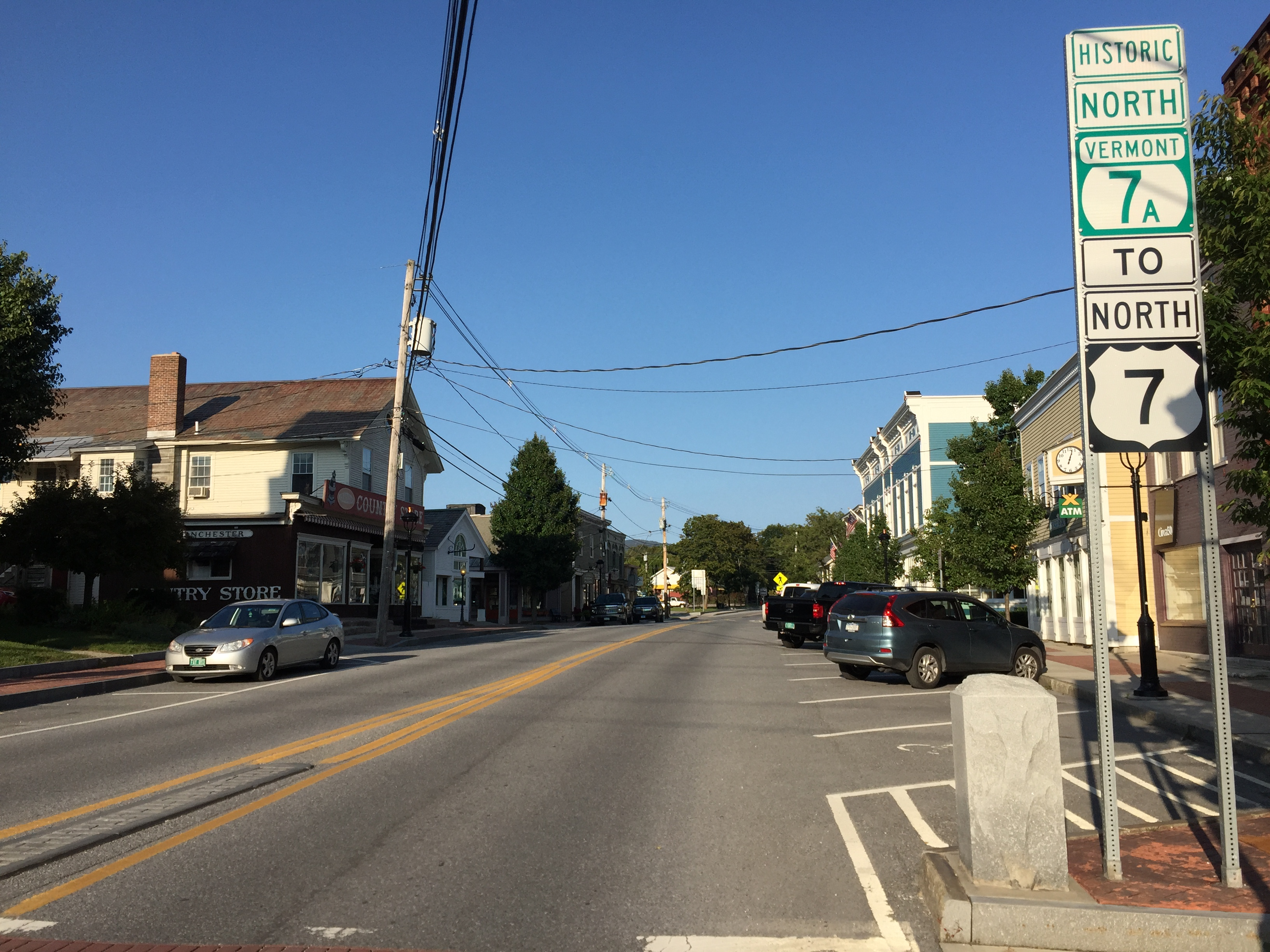
View north along VT 7A in Manchester Center

VT 7A begins at the southern end of the US 7 limited-access highway in Bennington. It heads northwest on Northside Drive for roughly six blocks, then turns north to follow the Ethan Allen Highway at the southern terminus of VT 67A. Upon passing under VT 279, VT 7A begins to parallel US 7. The two routes eventually reconnect by way of the Bennington North State Highway before US 7 veers off to the northeast. VT 7A, meanwhile, continues north into Shaftsbury.

Just inside Shaftsbury, VT 7A passes by the Robert Frost Stone House Museum. The route continues north to the village of South Shaftsbury, where it meets VT 67. North of the village, VT 7A curves slightly to the northeast as it enters Arlington. Here, the route travels past the Norman Rockwell Gallery and Exhibition and overlaps with VT 313. Outside of the village of Arlington, VT 7A takes on a more pronounced northeasterly routing into Manchester. The route passes near Hildene and serves the historic site by way of Hildene Road, then continues on to Manchester Center. Here, VT 7A intersects VT 11 and briefly overlaps VT 30 before exiting the village and entering the town of Dorset, where the route ends at another junction with US 7. Some drivers prefer VT 7A over the nearby four-lane US 7 freeway during the winter because it is significantly lower in elevation (up to 500 feet [150 m] lower than the freeway at points), so driving conditions are generally better during storms.

== History ==
The route is called "Historic" in order to avert confusion with the two to four-lane limited-access highway routing of US 7, known locally as the "Super 7". Before the limited-access highway opened, VT 7A was the original routing of US 7.

== Major intersections ==
The entire route is in Bennington County.

Location	mi	km	Destinations	Notes
Bennington	0.000	0.000	US 7	Southern terminus
Bennington	0.768	1.236	VT 67A north – North Bennington	Southern terminus of VT 67A
Bennington	2.356	3.792	US 7 – Manchester, Rutland, Bennington	Access via VT 9025; exit 2 on US 7
Shaftsbury	4.219	6.790	VT 67 west – North Bennington, North Hoosick, NY	Eastern terminus of VT 67
Arlington	12.405	19.964	VT 313 east to US 7 – Bennington	Southern end of VT 313 concurrency
Arlington	13.830	22.257	VT 313 west – New York State	Northern end of VT 313 concurrency
Manchester	22.999	37.013	VT 11 east / VT 30 south to US 7	Roundabout; southern end of VT 30 concurrency; western terminus of VT 11
Manchester	23.037	37.074	VT 30 north (Bonnet Street) – Dorset, Poultney	Northern end of VT 30 concurrency
Dorset	27.820	44.772	US 7 – East Dorset, Rutland, Arlington, Bennington	Northern terminus
1.000 mi = 1.609 km; 1.000 km = 0.621 mi: Concurrency terminus
