= Vermont Route 67 =

State highway in Bennington County, Vermont, US

Vermont Route 67
- VT 67 highlighted in red, VT 67A in blue

Route information
- Maintained by VTrans
- Length: 4.254 mi (6.846 km)

Major junctions
- West end: NY 67 at the New York state line in North Bennington
- East end: VT 7A in Shaftsbury

Location
- Country: United States
- State: Vermont
- Counties: Bennington

Highway system
- State highways in Vermont
← VT 66	→ VT 68

Vermont Route 67 (VT 67) is a 4.254-mile-long (6.846 km) east–west state highway in Bennington County, Vermont, United States. It runs from a continuation of New York State Route 67 at the New York state line in Shaftsbury to VT 7A farther east in the town. VT 67 also passes through the village of North Bennington.

== Route description ==
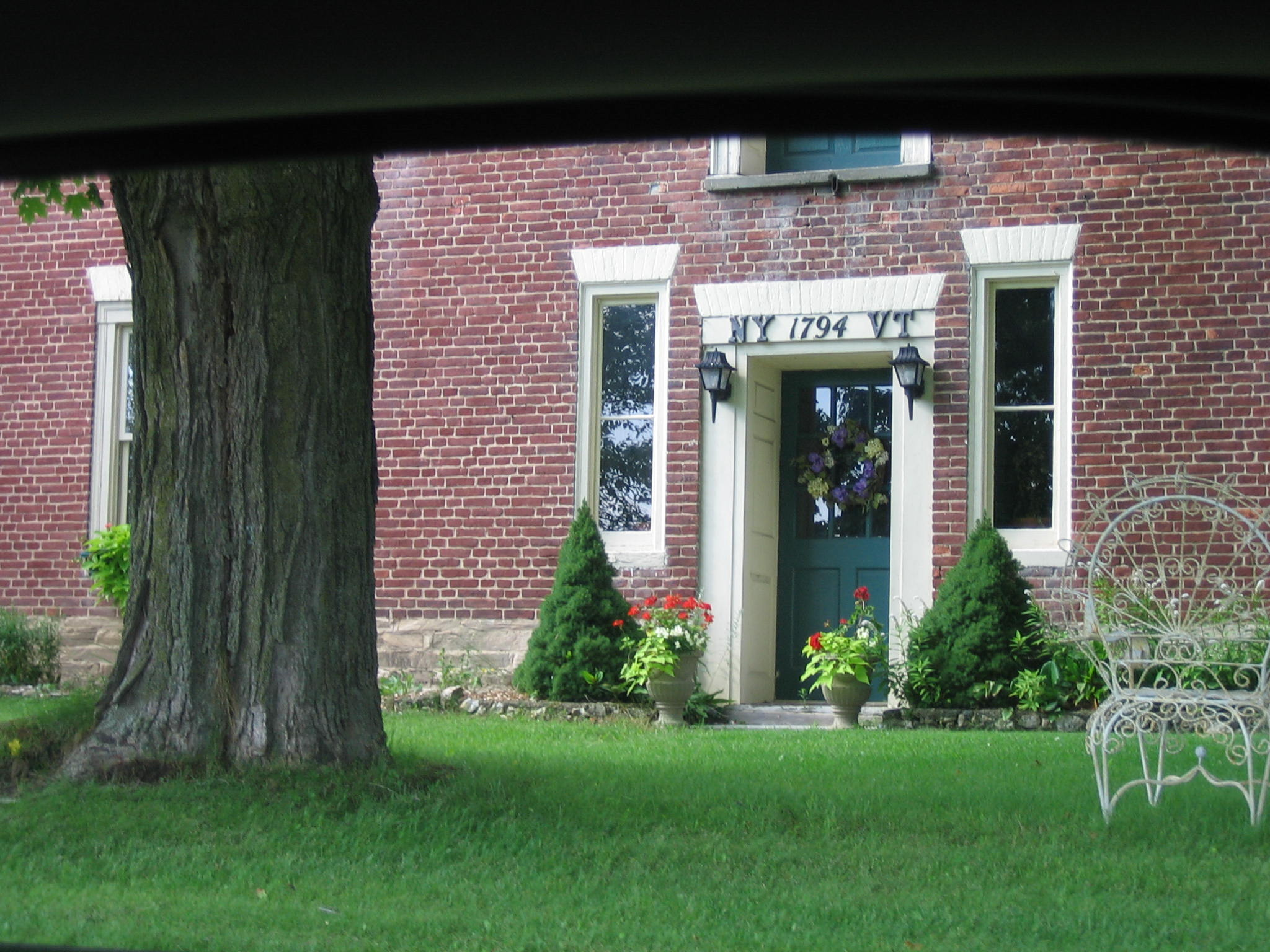
The David Mathews House, straddling the New York – Vermont state line located on NY / VT 67.

VT 67 starts at the New York state line as an eastward continuation of New York State Route 67. It curves twice, intersecting with White Creek Road, a continuation of Washington County, New York, County Route 68.

In North Bennington, VT 67 meets the northern terminus of VT 67A. As it does so, it curves straight north, with a secondary street (Houghton Street) leading to Lake Paran. After the intersection with Hawks Avenue, it takes a northeasterly path, ending at VT 7A in Shaftsbury.

== History ==
VT 67 was assigned by 1935, when it was added to the Vermont state highway system as part of the 1935 state highway system expansion.

== Major intersections ==
The entire route is in Bennington County.

Location	mi	km	Destinations	Notes
Shaftsbury	0.000	0.000	NY 67 west – North Hoosick	Continuation into New York
North Bennington	2.021	3.252	VT 67A south (Main Street) – Bennington	Northern terminus of VT 67A
Shaftsbury	4.254	6.846	VT 7A – Shaftsbury Center, Arlington, South Shaftsbury, Bennington	Eastern terminus; former US 7
1.000 mi = 1.609 km; 1.000 km = 0.621 mi

== Suffixed and special routes ==
=== Vermont Route 67A ===
Vermont Route 67A
- Location: Bennington
- Length: 3.348 mi (5.388 km)

Vermont Route 67A is a north–south state highway in Bennington County. It extends for 3.348 miles (5.388 km) from VT 7A in Bennington to VT 67 in North Bennington. VT 67A connects to VT 279 via an interchange located roughly 0.43 miles (0.69 km) north of VT 7A.

Major intersections

The entire route is in Bennington County.

Location	mi	km	Destinations	Notes
Bennington	0.000	0.000	VT 7A (Northside Drive) to US 7 – Bennington, Arlington, Manchester	Southern terminus; former US 7
Bennington	0.324– 0.537	0.521– 0.864	VT 279 to US 7 / NY 7 – Manchester, Brattleboro, Rutland, Troy, NY	Interchange
North Bennington	3.348	5.388	VT 67 (Bank Street) – North Hoosick, NY	Northern terminus
Concurrency terminus • Closed • Unopened

=== Vermont Route 67A Connector ===
Vermont Route 67A Connector
- Location: Bennington
- Existed: 1974–2004

Vermont Route 67A Connector was a connector route of VT 67A in Bennington. It was a short limited-access highway linking VT 67A to U.S. Route 7. VT 67A Connector was assigned in 1974 and removed in 2004 concurrent to the assignment of VT 279.
