= U.S. Route 7 in Vermont =

Section of U.S. Highway in Vermont

U.S. Route 7
- Ethan Allen Highway
- Map of Vermont with US 7 highlighted in red

Route information
- Maintained by VTrans
- Length: 176.328 mi (283.772 km)
- Existed: 1926–present

Major junctions
- South end: US 7 at the Massachusetts state line in Pownal
- VT 9 in Bennington; US 4 in Rutland; VT 30 / VT 125 in Middlebury; VT 22A in Vergennes; I-189 in South Burlington; US 2 in Burlington; I-89 / US 2 in Colchester; I-89 / VT 104A in Georgia; I-89 / VT 104 in St. Albans; I-89 / VT 207 in St. Albans
- North end: I-89 near Highgate

Location
- Country: United States
- State: Vermont
- Counties: Bennington, Rutland, Addison, Chittenden, Franklin

Highway system
- United States Numbered Highway System; List; Special; Divided; State highways in Vermont
← VT 5A	→ VT 7A

U.S. Route 7 (US 7) is a north–south highway extending from southern Connecticut to the northernmost part of Vermont. In Vermont, the route extends for 176 miles (283 km) along the western side of the state as a mostly two-lane rural road, with the exception of an expressway section between Bennington and East Dorset. US 7 is known as the Ethan Allen Highway for its entire length through the state, named after the US Revolutionary War general. US 7 ends at an interchange with Interstate 89 (I-89) in the town of Highgate, just south of the Canada–United States border. I-89 continues to the border crossing.

== Route description ==
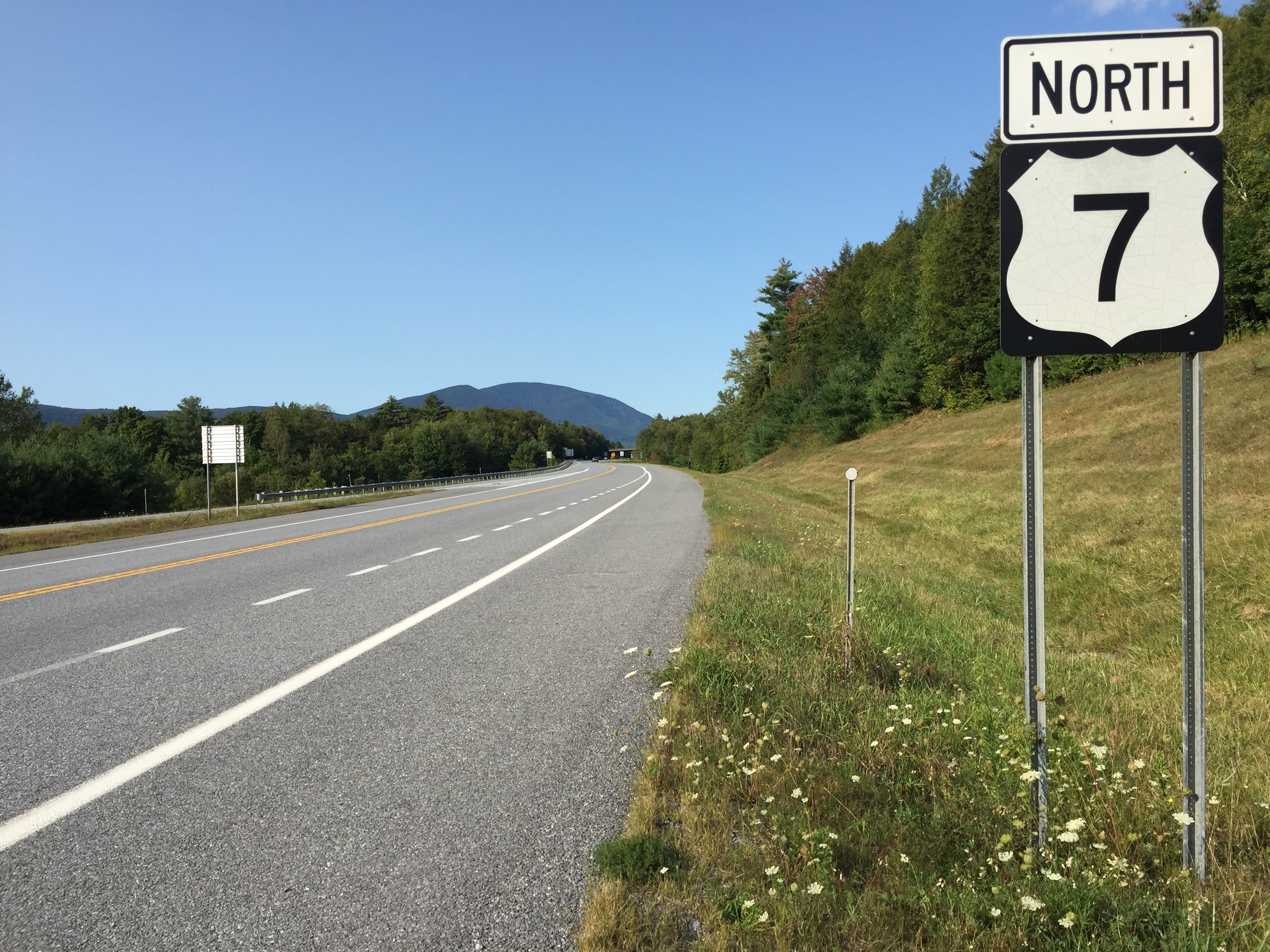
View north along "Super" US 7 in Sunderland

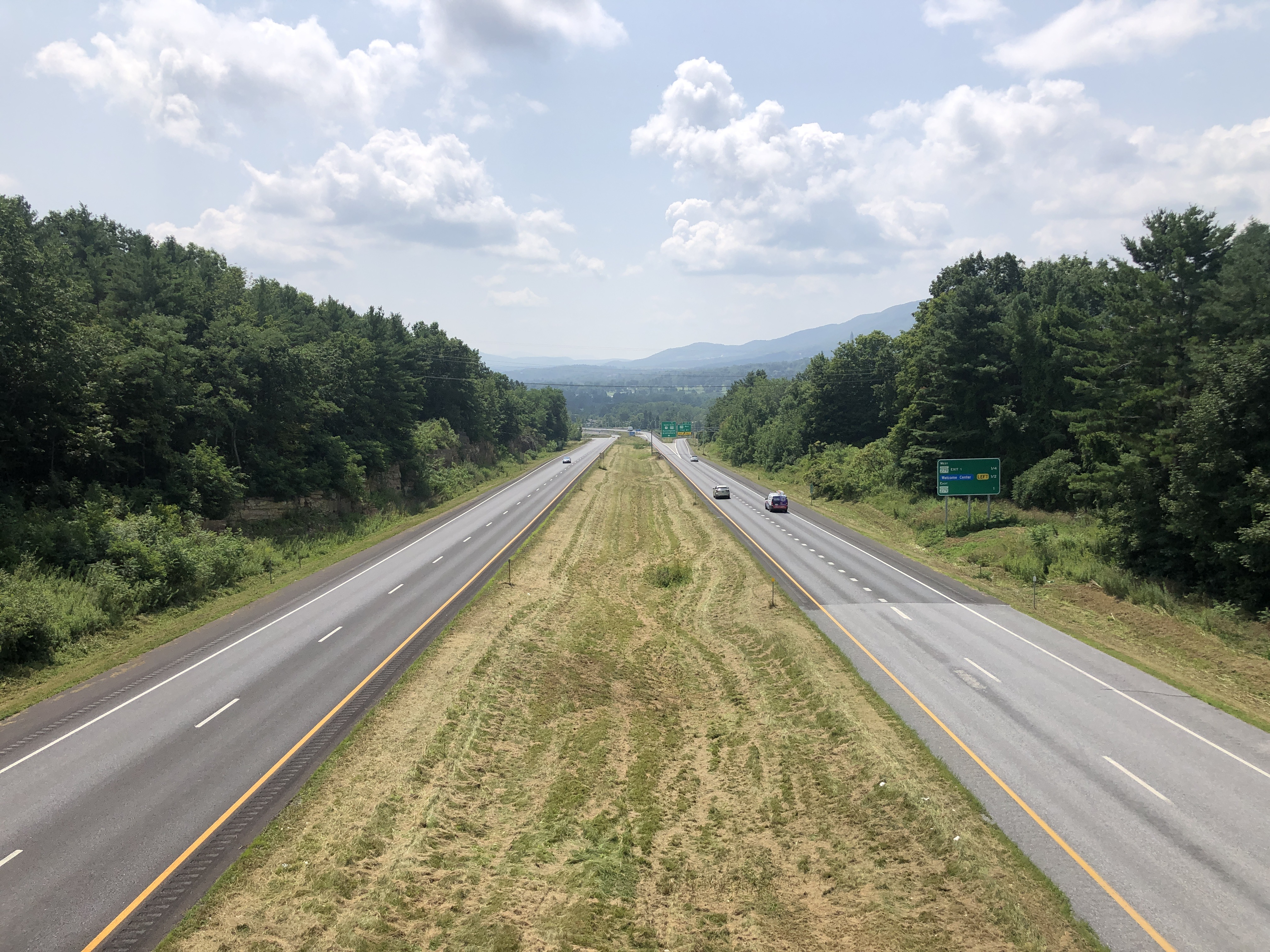
US 7 southbound approaching VT 279 in Bennington

US 7 crosses the Massachusetts–Vermont state line at Pownal, from where the road heads north to Bennington as a rural two-lane highway. Just north of downtown Bennington, the highway becomes a limited-access highway. For three miles (4.8 km), US 7 is a true expressway with divided carriageways and multiple lanes. The road subsequently narrows down to an undivided two-lane freeway; however, many stretches have passing lanes. This continues to a point just south of East Dorset, where US 7 reverts to a surface road.

Most of US 7 between East Dorset and the Canada–United States border is an undivided, uncontrolled road varying in width from two to four lanes. Two divided highway sections also exist: a 10-mile (16 km) section south of Rutland and a three-mile (4.8 km) stretch with numerous traffic signals between Shelburne and South Burlington known as Shelburne Road. There is overhead signage at the junction with I-189 in South Burlington that directs northbound trucks onto I-189. While US 7 heads directly into Burlington, I-189 bypasses the city to the south and east and leads directly to I-89, which runs close to US 7 north of Winooski.

Near downtown Burlington, US 7 intersects with US 2; the latter route joins US 7 for more than nine miles (14 km) to Colchester. From here, US 7 and I-89 run through northern Vermont to Highgate, where US 7 ends at the northernmost exit on I-89.

== History ==
US 7 was assigned in 1926. I-89 was originally envisioned to parallel US 7 from the Canadian frontier to the Massachusetts border. This plan was ultimately canceled, and I-89 was shifted to its current alignment, turning southeast at Burlington toward Montpelier and White River Junction. Prior to the cancelation of the original I-89 routing, approximately 25 miles (40 km) of freeway (mostly super two with some four-lane sections) was built in the US 7 corridor between Bennington and Manchester, plus an additional seven miles (11 km) of four-lane highway between Wallingford and Rutland were completed.

== Major intersections ==
County	Location	mi	km	Old exit	New exit	Destinations	Notes
Bennington	Pownal	0.000	0.000			US 7 south – Williamstown	Continuation into Massachusetts
Bennington	Pownal	1.863	2.998			VT 346 west – Pownal, North Pownal	Eastern terminus of VT 346
Bennington	Community of Bennington	10.957	17.634			VT 9 (Main Street)	
Bennington	Town of Bennington	12.140	19.537			VT 7A north (Kocher Drive) to VT 67A north – Welcome Center	Southern terminus of VT 7A; former routing of US 7
Bennington	Town of Bennington	12.236	19.692	Southern end of freeway section			
Bennington	Town of Bennington	13.153	21.168	1	13	VT 279 to VT 9 east – Brattleboro, Troy	Also serves Vermont Welcome Center
Bennington	Town of Bennington	14.393	23.163	2	14	VT 7A – Shaftsbury	Access via VT 9025
Bennington	Sunderland	24.224	38.985	3	24	VT 313 west to VT 7A – Arlington, Sunderland, Shaftsbury	Eastern terminus of VT 313
Bennington	Manchester Center	34.501	55.524	4	34	VT 11 / VT 30 to VT 7A – Manchester Center, Manchester	Also serves Dorset and Peru
Bennington	Dorset	38.897	62.599	Northern end of freeway section			
Bennington	Dorset	38.897	62.599			VT 7A south – Manchester Center	Northern terminus of VT 7A; former routing of US 7
Rutland	Wallingford	56.165	90.389			VT 140 west / VT 140 east – Tinmouth, East Wallingford	
Rutland	Wallingford	57.054	91.820			VT 7B north (Clarendon Road)	Southern terminus of VT 7B; former routing of US 7
Rutland	Clarendon	58.581	94.277			VT 7B south	Southern end of VT 7B concurrency; former routing of US 7
Rutland	Clarendon	59.297	95.429			VT 7B north – Clarendon	Northern end of VT 7B concurrency; former routing of US 7
Rutland	Clarendon	61.169	98.442			VT 103 south – Airport, Ludlow	Northern terminus of VT 103
Rutland	Clarendon	62.591	100.730			VT 7B – North Clarendon	Former routing of US 7
Rutland	Clarendon	63.393	102.021			VT 7B south	Northern terminus of VT 7B; former routing of US 7
Rutland	Town of Rutland	63.844	102.747			US 4 west – Fair Haven	Southern end of US 4 concurrency
Rutland	City of Rutland	65.944	106.127			US 4 Bus. west – Downtown Rutland	Eastern terminus of US 4 Bus.
Rutland	City of Rutland	66.081	106.347			US 4 east	Northern end of US 4 concurrency
Rutland	Pittsford	73.057	117.574			VT 3 south – Proctor	Northern terminus of VT 3
Rutland	Community of Brandon	81.656	131.413			VT 73 east (Park Street)	Southern end of VT 73 concurrency
Rutland	Community of Brandon	82.072	132.082			VT 73 west (Champlain Street)	Northern end of VT 73 concurrency
Addison	Salisbury	91.315	146.957			VT 53 south – Lake Dunmore, Forestdale	Northern terminus of VT 53
Addison	Middlebury	94.157	151.531			VT 116 north to VT 125 east – East Middlebury, Snow Bowl Ski Area, Bristol	Southern terminus of VT 116
Addison	Middlebury	94.431	151.972			VT 125 east – East Middlebury, Airport, Ripton	Southern end of VT 125 concurrency
Addison	Middlebury	97.067	156.214			VT 125 west – Cornwall, Bridport	Northern end of VT 125 concurrency
Addison	Middlebury	98.285	158.174			VT 30 south to VT 125 west / VT 23 – Cornwall, Hospital	Northern terminus of VT 30
Addison	New Haven	106.034	170.645			VT 17 east – New Haven, Bristol	Southern end of VT 17 concurrency
Addison	New Haven	106.148	170.829			VT 17 west – Waltham, Bridge to NY State	Northern end of VT 17 concurrency
Addison	Ferrisburgh	111.511	179.460			VT 22A south – Vergennes	Northern terminus of VT 22A
Chittenden	Charlotte	120.723	194.285			VT F5 west – Charlotte, Ferry to N.Y. State	Eastern terminus of VT F5
Chittenden	South Burlington–Burlington line	130.350– 130.626	209.778– 210.222			I-189 east to I-89 – Montpelier, St. Albans	Western terminus of I-189
Chittenden	Burlington	131.627	211.833			US 7 Alt. north (Shelburne Street at South Willard Street)	Southern terminus of US 7 Alt.
Chittenden	Burlington	132.550	213.319			US 2 east	Southern end of US 2 concurrency
Chittenden	Burlington	133.490	214.831			US 7 Alt. south (Riverside Avenue at Hyde Street)	Northern terminus of US 7 Alt.
Chittenden	Winooski	134.793	216.928			VT 15 east to I-89 south – Essex Junction	Roundabout; western terminus of VT 15
Chittenden	Colchester	135.804– 135.876	218.555– 218.671			I-89 – Burlington, St. Albans, Champlain Islands	Exit 16 on I-89
Chittenden	Colchester	137.620	221.478			VT 127 south	Northern terminus of VT 127
Chittenden	Colchester	139.067	223.807			To VT 2A south – Essex Junction	Access via VT 127
Chittenden	Colchester	139.261	224.119			VT 2A south – Essex Junction	Northern terminus of VT 2A
Chittenden	Colchester	142.151	228.770			US 2 west to I-89 – Lake Champlain Islands, New York State	Northern end of US 2 concurrency
Franklin	Georgia	151.526	243.857			VT 104A east – Fairfax	Northern terminus of VT 104A
Franklin	Georgia	151.689– 152.011	244.120– 244.638			I-89 – St. Albans, Montreal, Burlington	Exit 18 on I-89
Franklin	City of St. Albans	160.373	258.095			VT 36 east (Fairfield Street)	Southern end of VT 36 concurrency
Franklin	City of St. Albans	160.401	258.140			VT 36 west (Lake Street) – St. Albans Bay	Northern end of VT 36 concurrency
Franklin	City of St. Albans	160.952	259.027			VT 38 west (Lower Newton Street)	Eastern terminus of VT 38
Franklin	City of St. Albans	161.363	259.689			VT 105 east – Sheldon Junction, Enosburg Falls	Western terminus of VT 105
Franklin	Town of St. Albans	162.514	261.541			VT 207 north to I-89 – Burlington, Highgate Center, Swanton, Montreal Que.	Southern terminus of VT 207
Franklin	Village of Swanton	168.951	271.900			VT 78 east to I-89 – Highgate Center, East Highgate	Southern end of VT 78 concurrency
Franklin	Village of Swanton	169.033	272.032			VT 78 west to VT 36 – Alburg, New York State	North end of VT 78 concurrency
Franklin	Highgate	175.963– 176.328	283.185– 283.772			I-89 – Montreal, Swanton, St. Albans	Northern terminus; exit 22 on I-89
1.000 mi = 1.609 km; 1.000 km = 0.621 mi: Concurrency terminus

== Suffixed routes ==
US 7 has two suffixed routes, both of which are old alignments of US 7.

- VT 7A (27.820 mi or 44.772 km) is an alternate route of US 7 between Bennington and Dorset. The route is signed as "Historic VT 7A" to distinguish it, the original routing of US 7, from the modern US 7 limited-access highway.
- VT 7B (6.786 mi or 10.921 km) is an alternate route of US 7 through the towns of Wallingford and Clarendon. VT 7B was the original alignment of US 7 prior to the construction of the current US 7 divided highway through the area. The route intersects US 7 five times (including the terminuses) and overlaps it for 0.716 miles (1.152 km) in Clarendon.

== US 7 Alternate ==
U.S. Route 7 Alternate
- Location: Burlington
- Length: 2.107 mi (3.391 km)

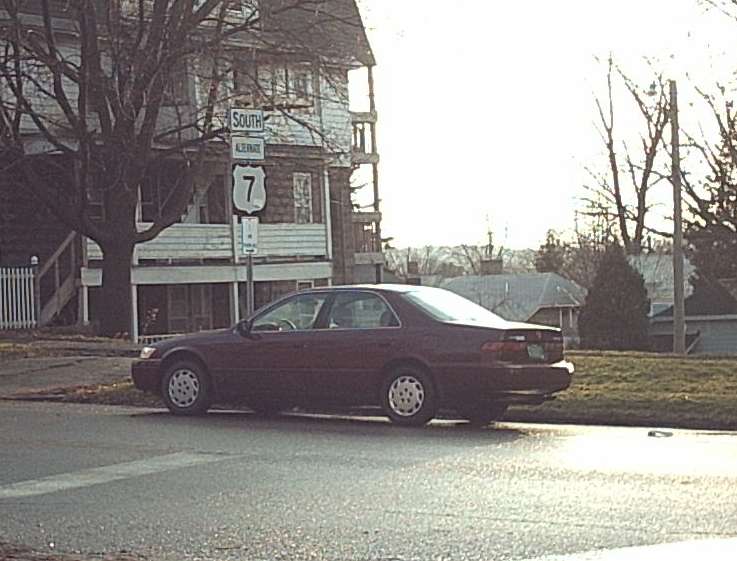
The original US 7 Alt. assembly along the short route.

U.S. Route 7 Alternate (US 7 Alt.) is an alternate route of US 7 in Burlington. The southbound-only US 7 Alt. begins at the intersection of Hyde Street and Riverside Avenue (US 2 and US 7) and runs for a distance of 2.107 miles (3.391 km) in the following manner: west on Riverside Avenue, south on North and South Winooski avenues, south on St. Paul Street, and south on Shelburne Street to its end at US 7 at a roundabout intersection with South Willard Street (US 7) and Locust Street. Mainline US 7 travels over Hyde Street and North and South Willard streets until the aforementioned intersection.

As of July 2016, there are three US 7 Alt. assemblies along the route. The original one is located on Saint Paul Street in Burlington, just south of the intersection with South Winooski Avenue and Howard Street, with the newer two on South Winooski Avenue, with one at the intersection with Pearl Street, and the other at Main Street.

As of November 2022, in conjunction with the reconstruction of the rotary-style intersection where US 7 Alt. terminates, there is a new directional US 7 Alt. sign installed in the rotary, along with a lone reassurance US 7 Alt. marker installed just to the north.

U.S. Route 7
Previous state: Massachusetts	Vermont	Next state: Terminus
