= David Mathews House =

Historic house in Vermont, United States

- U.S. National Register of Historic Places
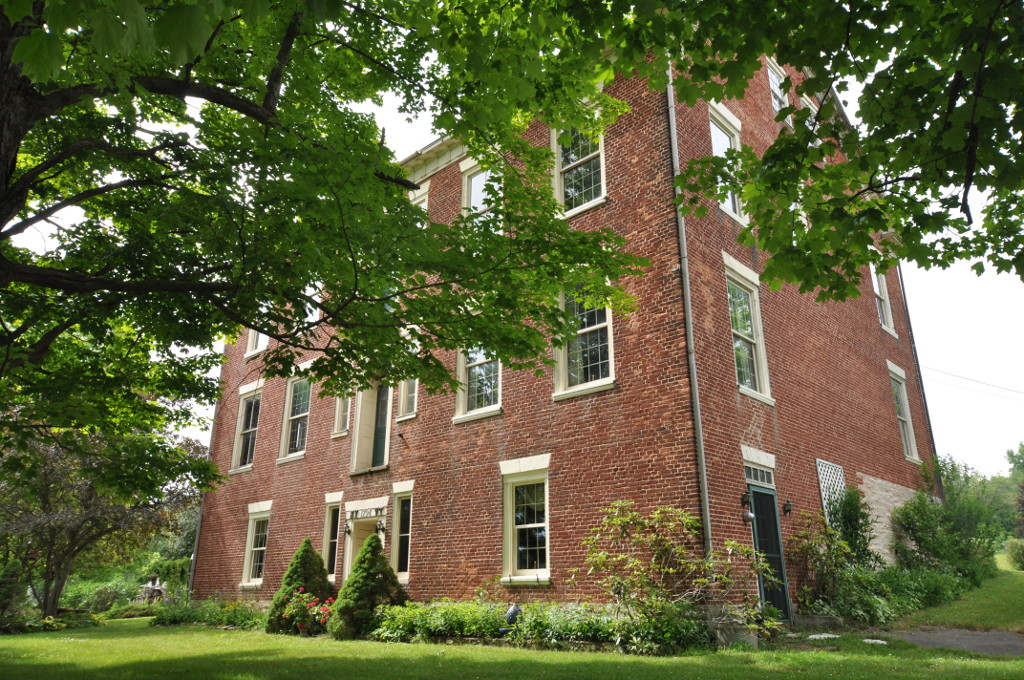

- Location within New York Location within the United States
- Location: VT 67/NY 67, Shaftsbury, Vermont and Hoosick, New York
- Coordinates: 42°56′27″N 73°16′28″W
- Area: 2 acres (0.81 ha)
- Built: 1800
- Architectural style: Federal
- NRHP reference No.: 79000274
- Added to NRHP: September 10, 1979

The David Mathews House, also known as the State Line House, is a historic house straddling the state line on New York State Route 67 and Vermont Route 67 in Hoosick, New York and Shaftsbury, Vermont. Built about 1800, it is an imposing brick example of Federal architecture. The building is the subject of a number of tales, some of dubious authenticity. It was listed on the National Register of Historic Places in 1979.

== Description and history ==
The Mathews House stands on the north side of NY/VT Route 67, just west of State Line Road in southwestern Shaftsbury and northeast of Walloomsac, New York. The house is a three-story, five bay wide, brick Federal style dwelling with a gable roof. It features pattern brick bonding, laid in a modified Flemish pattern, and a full Doric order frieze and cornice. As built, its main facade was originally to the north, but it has essentially identical northern and southern entrances, set in round-arch openings with fanlights above and flanking sidelights. The interior retains much original woodwork, including paneling, fireplace surrounds, and moulded door surrounds.

The house was built about 1800 by David Mathews, a veteran of the American Revolutionary War, and has a significant number of unusual high-style Federal period features for what was then (and is still now) a fairly remote rural setting. Mathews served in the Continental Army. He has often been confused with Loyalist David Mathews who served as Mayor under the British and had owned property nearby which was subsequently seized.

One apocryphal story associated with the house is that, during the war, Mathews stole some 3,000 gold coins from Friedrich Baum, a Hessian serving with the British Army during the Revolutionary War, and buried them in the house's basement; as the house was built somewhat later, it is almost certainly false. The building saw use in the 19th century as a tavern, occasionally hosting judicial proceedings. Its position on the state line, it was said, made it impossible for a New York judge to convict a defendant on the Vermont side of the house.

== See also ==
- National Register of Historic Places listings in Bennington County, Vermont
- National Register of Historic Places listings in Rensselaer County, New York
