= Interstate 189 =

Highway in Vermont

Interstate 189
- I-189 highlighted in red

Route information
- Auxiliary route of I-89
- Maintained by VTrans
- Length: 1.49 mi (2.40 km)
- NHS: Entire route

Major junctions
- West end: US 7 / Champlain Parkway at the South Burlington–Burlington city line
- East end: I-89 / Dorset Street / Kennedy Drive in South Burlington

Location
- Country: United States
- State: Vermont
- Counties: Chittenden

Highway system
- Interstate Highway System; Main; Auxiliary; Suffixed; Business; Future; State highways in Vermont
← VT 155	→ VT 191

Interstate 189 (I-189) is an auxiliary Interstate Highway in Chittenden County, Vermont. The spur extends for 1.49 miles (2.40 km) from I-89 exit 13 in South Burlington to US Route 7 (US 7) at the Burlington city limit, where it then continues as the Champlain Parkway into Burlington. I-189 is the only auxiliary route of I-89 and the only auxiliary Interstate Highway in Vermont.

== Route description ==
I-189 serves as an Interstate-grade connector between I-89 and a commercial district along US 7 (Shelburne Road). It is signed as an east–west highway. Prior to 2010, only one directional sign had been posted on the highway, on the eastbound side after the on-ramp from US 7. Sign replacements and additions in late 2010 added directional signs on both the eastbound and westbound sides of the route.

== History ==
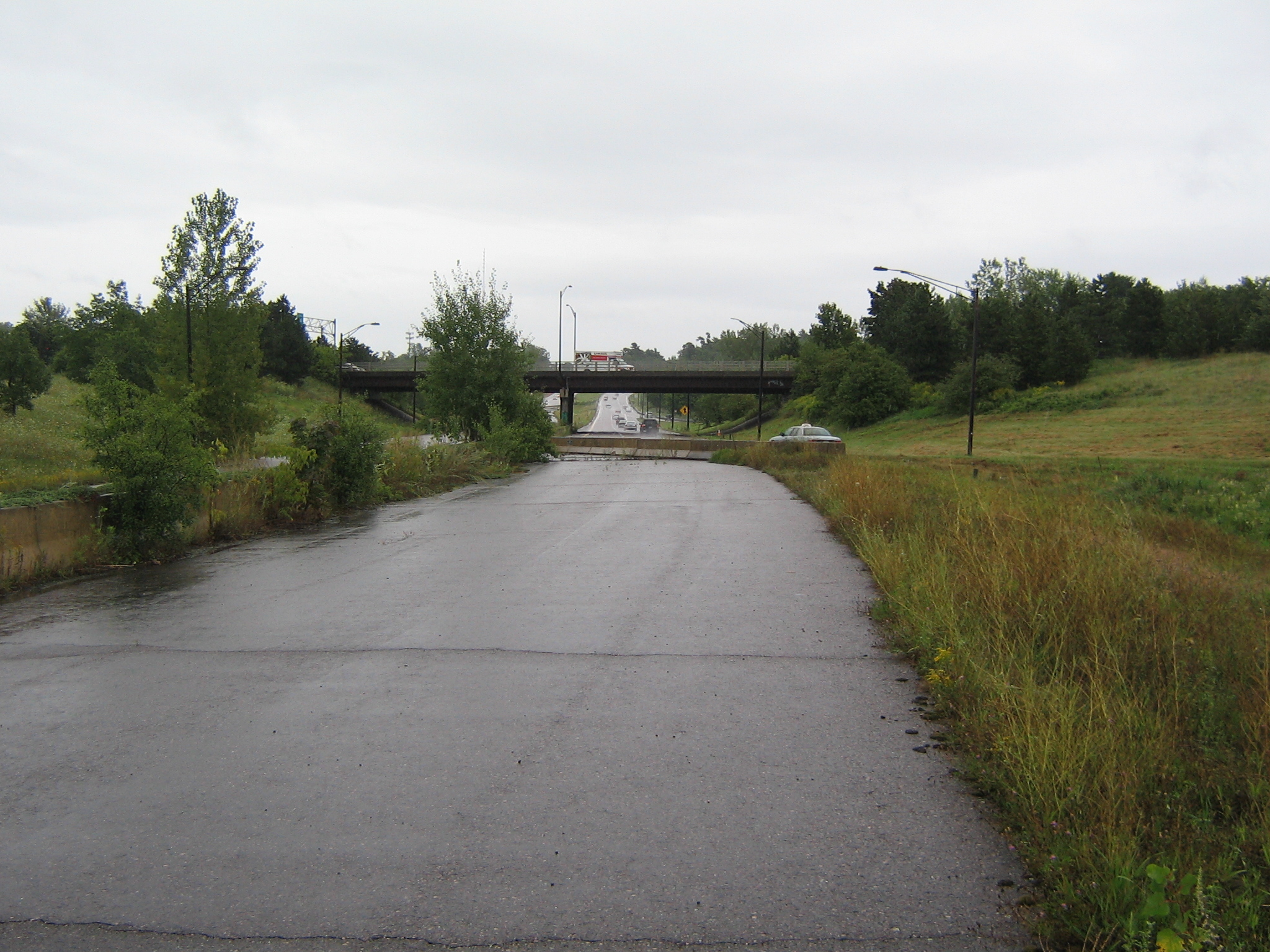
Then-unused section of the now-Champlain Parkway right of way in 2009

The concept of I-189, known as the Southern Connector and the Champlain Parkway, into the city of Burlington along the waterfront and service an industrial area was first made in the mid-1960s. The construction of the C-1 Section (I-189/U.S. Route 7 interchange to Home Avenue) was largely completed by June 1988 but the remediation plan development for the Pine Street Barge Canal Superfund Site delayed the construction of the C-2 Section (Home Avenue to Lakeside Avenue) and the C-8 Section (Lakeside Avenue to Battery Street through the Pine Street Barge Canal Superfund Site). Additionally, legal challenges mostly came from the Pine Street Coalition argued the project was unnecessary and too costly as well as discriminatory due to the increased traffic in the low-income and minority residents of King and Maple streets neighborhood. The original Southern Connector project was eventually canceled as the city largely left behind its industrial past in favor of tourism in the 1980s and the roadway was abandoned just beyond the US 7 interchange. As a result, Jersey barriers were in place on I-189 west directing traffic onto the US 7 offramp, orphaning approximately 0.65 miles (1.05 km) of road, along with a few ramps. More support of the project eventually led to a resumption of construction.

=== Champlain Parkway ===
The federal government previously gave the state a deadline to make a final decision on building the extension or they would lose matching funds. In early 2012, consensus settled on a two-lane parkway named the "Champlain Parkway" that will run northerly from Home Avenue for about 0.7 miles (1.1 km), then curve onto existing city streets in order to funnel traffic into downtown away from US 7. I-189 will extend westward, then turn to the north, terminate at Home Avenue, and connect to the parkway. As built, I-189 terminates at the US 7 exit, with the parkway continuing westward. In August 2014, the parkway received its land use permit, clearing the way for the project to begin. Opposition to the $30-million project and changes to its design led to delays in construction, which finally began in June 2022. The segment of the parkway between Home and Lakeside Avenues opened in August 2024, with the entire parkway going into service on June 29, 2026.

== Exit list ==
The entire route is in South Burlington, Chittenden County. All exits are unnumbered.

mi	km	Destinations	Notes
0.000	0.000	Champlain Parkway – Burlington	Western terminus
0.000	0.000	US 7 – Shelburne, Burlington	Listed as exit 1 in VAOT Route Log
1.488	2.395	I-89 – Winooski, St. Albans, Williston, Montpelier	Eastbound exit and westbound entrance; eastern terminus; exit 13 (milepost exit 87) on I-89
1.488	2.395	Dorset Street / Kennedy Drive – Burlington International Airport	At-grade intersection
1.000 mi = 1.609 km; 1.000 km = 0.621 mi: Incomplete access

== Images ==
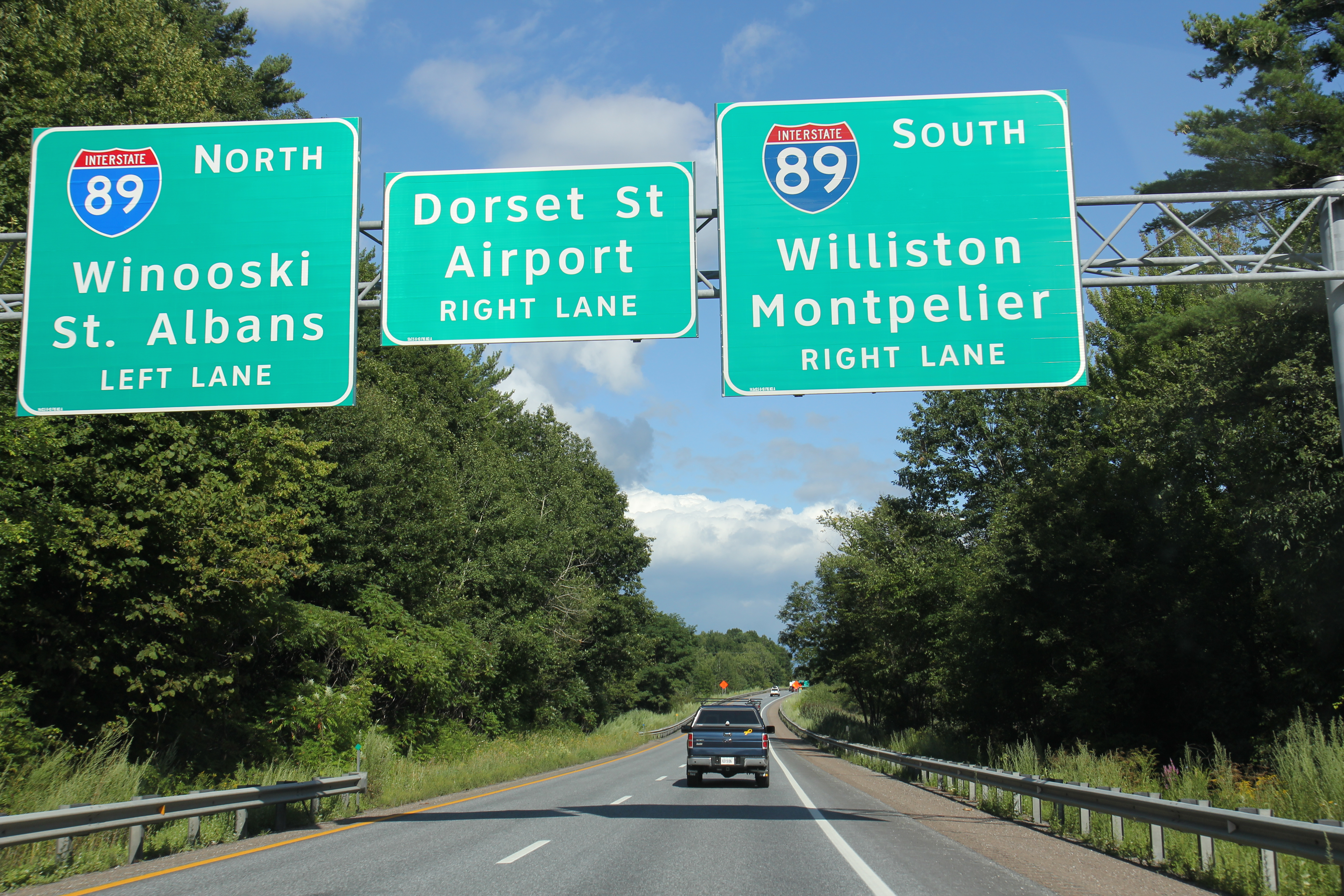
Eastern terminus (August 2014)

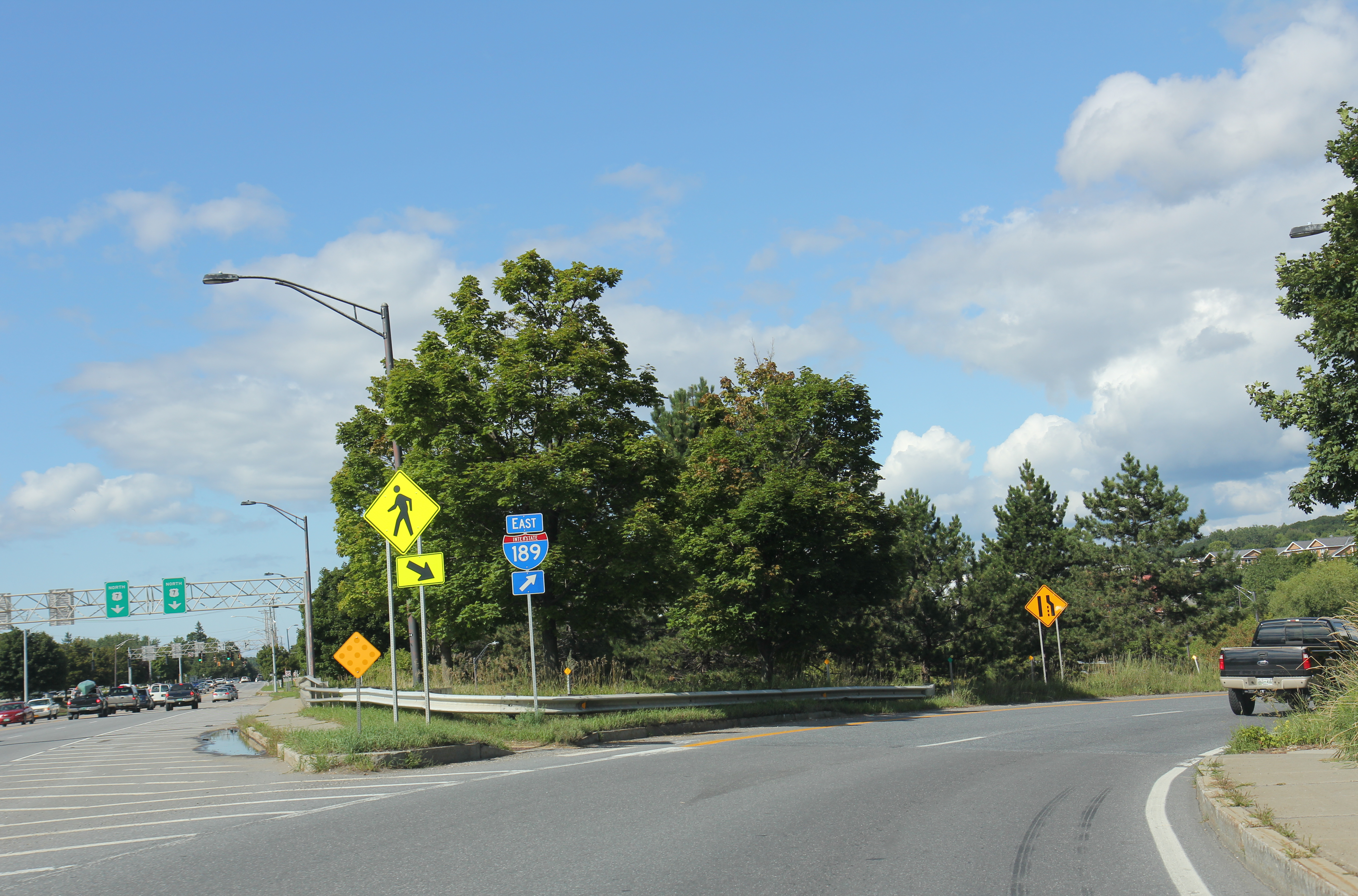
Western terminus (August 2014)

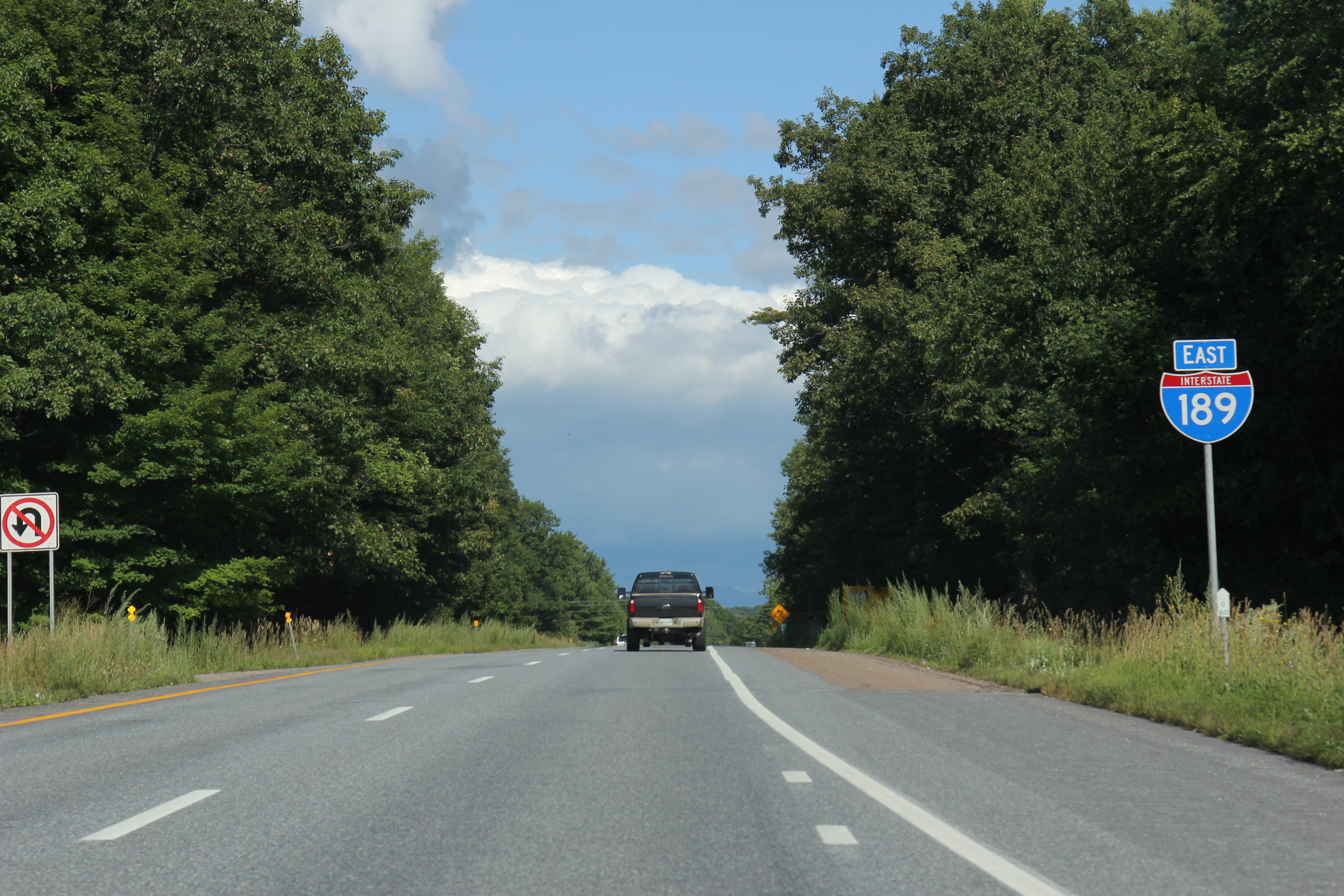
Looking east at a sign for I-189

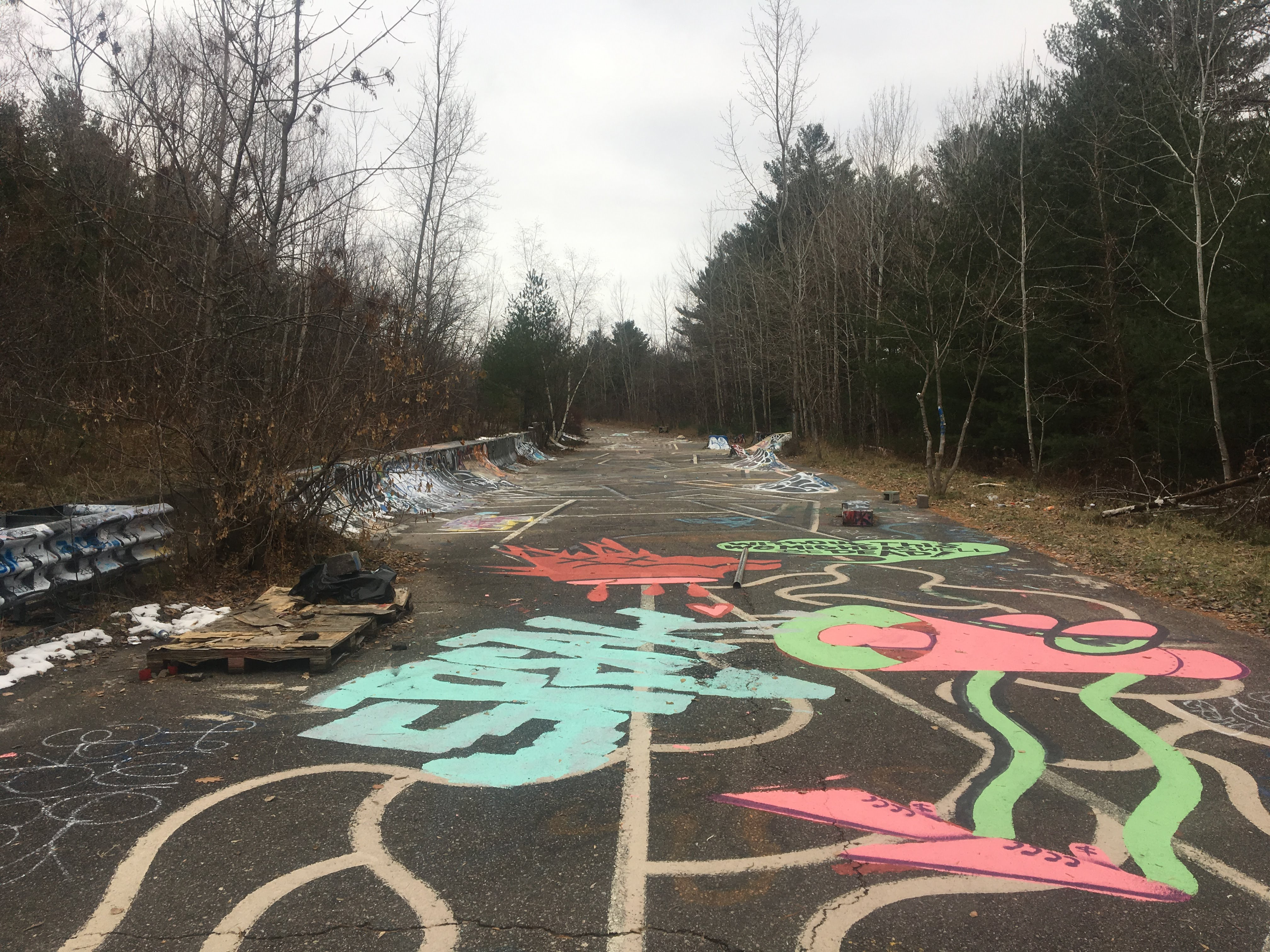
Looking south at the abandoned section of the Champlain Parkway with a makeshift skate park and graffiti

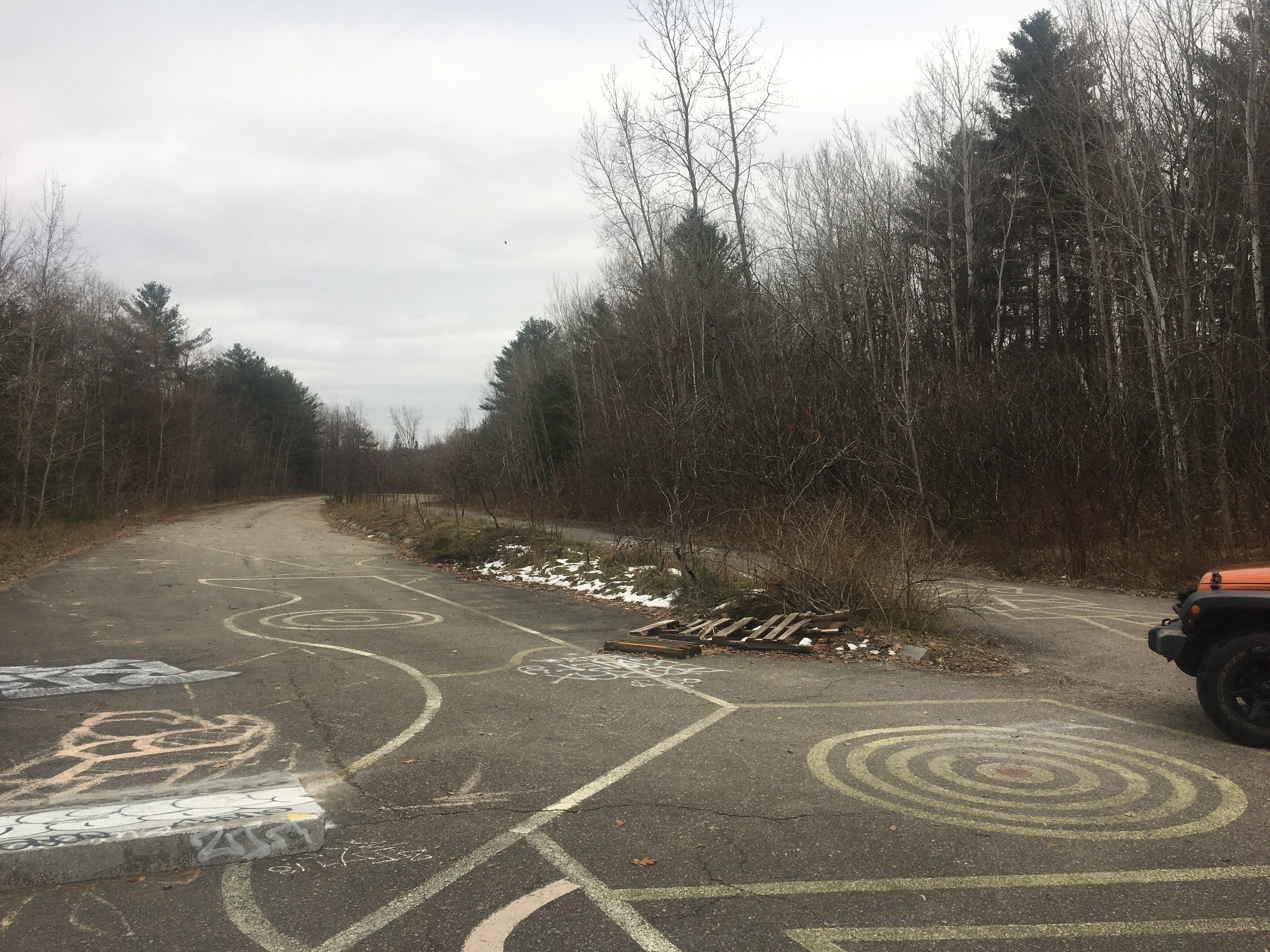
Looking north at the abandoned section
