= The Village School of North Bennington =

Coordinates: 42.930064°N 73.244557°W

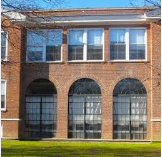
- Iron window frames from the Mid-19th Century at the Village School of North Bennington
- North Bennington, Vermont; United States

Information
- Type: Independent
- Grades: Pre-K to 6th
- Website: www.vsnb.org

The Village School of North Bennington is an independent Pre-K to Sixth Grade school in North Bennington, Vermont. It is accredited by the New England Association of Schools and Colleges.

In 2006, it was called the North Bennington Graded School.
