= Manchester Center, Vermont =

Census-designated place in Vermont, United States

- Census-designated place
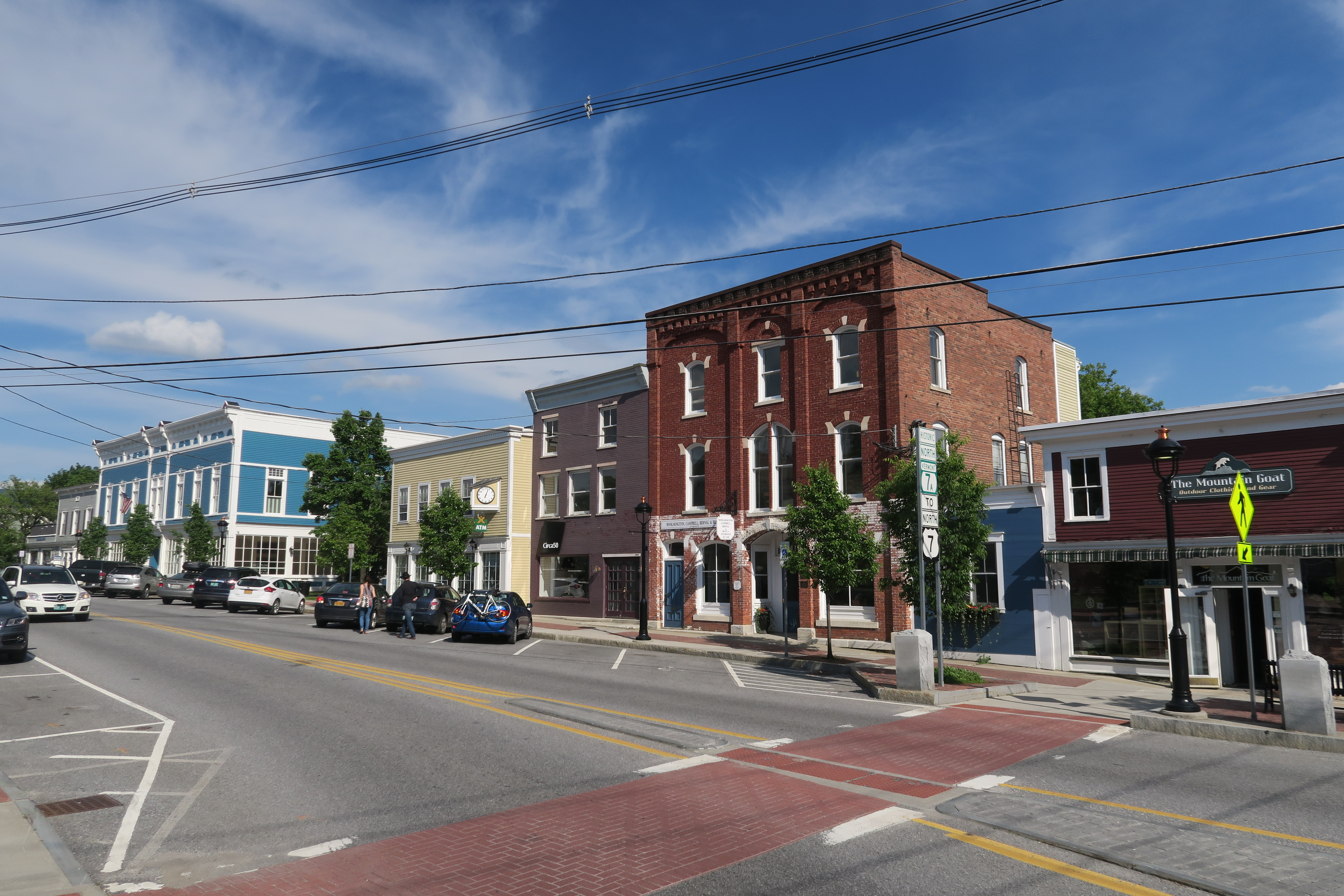
- Main Street

- Location within Vermont
- Coordinates: 43°10′37″N 73°03′25″W
- Country: United States
- State: Vermont
- County: Bennington
- Town: Manchester

Area
  - Total: 4.53 sq mi (11.74 km^{2})
  - Land: 4.52 sq mi (11.70 km^{2})
  - Water: 0.015 sq mi (0.04 km^{2})
- Elevation: 748 ft (228 m)

Population (2020)
  - Total: 2,145
  - Density: 469/sq mi (181.2/km^{2})
- Time zone: UTC-5 (Eastern (EST))
  - Summer (DST): UTC-4 (EDT)
- ZIP code: 05255
- Area code: 802
- FIPS code: 50-42925
- GNIS feature ID: 1461118

Manchester Center is a census-designated place (CDP) in the town of Manchester in Bennington County, Vermont, United States. As of the 2020 census, Manchester Center had a population of 2,145.

== Geography ==
Manchester Center is located in the northeast part of the town of Manchester. The CDP encompasses the community of Manchester Center as well as the area known as Manchester Depot to the east. The CDP is bordered by the incorporated village of Manchester to the southwest.

According to the United States Census Bureau, the Manchester Center CDP has a total area of 4.53 square miles (11.74 km^{2}), of which 4.52 square miles (11.70 km^{2}) is land and 0.02 square miles (0.04 km^{2}), or 0.36%, is water.

=== Climate ===
This climatic region is typified by large seasonal temperature differences, with warm to hot (and often humid) summers and cold (sometimes severely cold) winters. According to the Köppen Climate Classification system, Manchester Center has a humid continental climate, abbreviated "Dfb" on climate maps.

== Demographics ==
As of the census of 2000, there were 2,065 people, 912 households, and 534 families residing in the CDP. The population density was 176.0 people/km^{2} (456 people/mi^{2}). There were 1,158 housing units at an average density of 98.7 units/km^{2} (256 units/mi^{2}). The racial makeup of the town was 97.72% White, 0.24% African American, 0.34% Native American, 0.19% Asian, 0.58% from other races, and 0.92% from two or more races. Hispanic or Latino of any race were 1.60% of the population.

There were 912 households, out of which 28.3% had children under the age of 18 living with them, 42.7% were married couples living together, 12.5% had a female householder with no husband present, and 41.4% were non-families. 34.8% of all households were made up of individuals, and 14.5% had someone living alone who was 65 years of age or older. The average household size was 2.18 and the average family size was 2.83.

In the CDP, the age distribution of the population shows 23.1% under the age of 18, 4.8% from 18 to 24, 27.1% from 25 to 44, 24.6% from 45 to 64, and 20.4% who were 65 years of age or older. The median age was 42 years. For every 100 females, there were 83.6 males. For every 100 females age 18 and over, there were 79.6 males.

== Economy ==
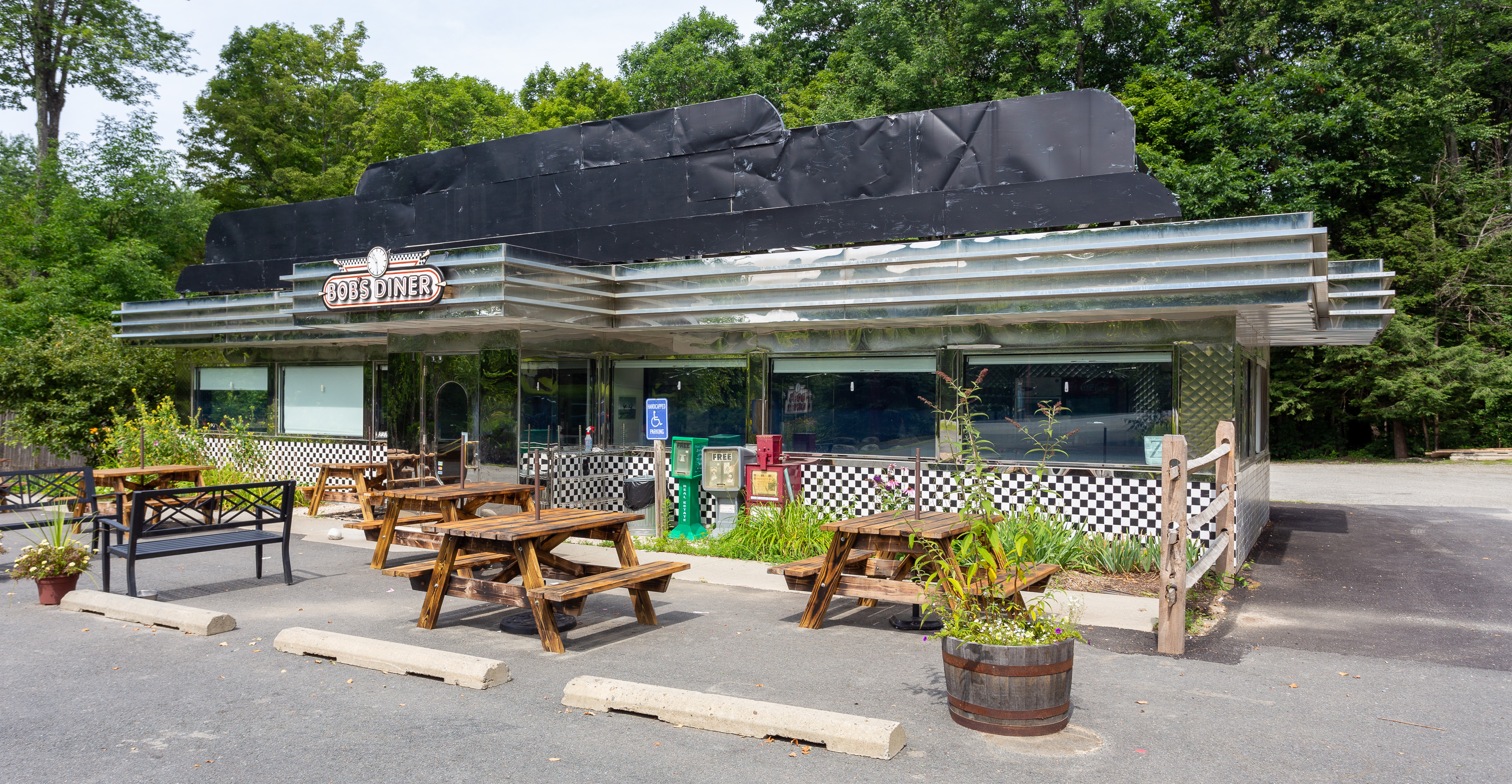
Bob's Diner in Manchester Center

=== Personal income ===
The median income for a household in the CDP was $38,125, and the median income for a family was $44,688. Males had a median income of $29,444 versus $21,570 for females. The per capita income for the CDP was $21,271. About 6.7% of families and 4.8% of the population were below the poverty line, including 4.1% of those under age 18 and 6.1% of those age 65 or over.

== Infrastructure ==
=== Transportation ===
U.S. Route 7, a super two freeway, passes through the eastern part of the CDP, with access from one interchange (VT 11 and VT 30). Vermont Routes 11 and 30 and Vermont Route 7A intersect in the village. VT 7A, the old alignment of US 7, leads north to East Dorset where it rejoins US 7, and south to Arlington and Bennington. VT 30 leads northwest to Dorset and Pawlet and southeast across the Green Mountains to Brattleboro. VT 11 leads east across the mountains to Springfield, Vermont.

The village installed traffic circles in two locations in 2012 to alleviate traffic congestion.

== Notable people ==
- Robert Todd Lincoln, son of the President, and his descendants, spent summers here.
- Everwood actor Treat Williams resided in Manchester Center at the time of his death.
