= New York State Route 67 =

State highway in eastern New York, US

New York State Route 67
- NY 67 highlighted in red and NY 915C in blue

Route information
- Maintained by NYSDOT, the cities of Amsterdam, Johnstown and Mechanicville, and the village of Ballston Spa
- Length: 86.55 mi (139.29 km)
- Existed: 1930–present

Major junctions
- West end: NY 5 in St. Johnsville
- NY 30A in Johnstown; NY 5 / NY 30 in Amsterdam; I-87 in Malta; US 4 / NY 32 in Mechanicville
- East end: VT 67 at the Vermont state line in Hoosick

Location
- Country: United States
- State: New York
- Counties: Montgomery, Fulton, Saratoga, Rensselaer, Washington

Highway system
- New York Highways; Interstate; US; State; Reference; Parkways
← NY 66	→ NY 68

New York State Route 67 (NY 67) is an 86.55-mile-long (139.29 km) east–west state highway in eastern New York, United States. The western terminus of the route is at an intersection with NY 5 in the town of St. Johnsville. Its eastern terminus is at the Vermont state line in Hoosick, where it continues eastward as Vermont Route 67 (VT 67).

== Route description ==
=== Montgomery and Fulton counties ===
NY 67 begins at an intersection with NY 5 east of the village of St. Johnsville in the town of the same name. It heads eastward across northern Montgomery County as New Turnpike Road to the Fulton County line, where maintenance of NY 67 shifted from the New York State Department of Transportation (NYSDOT) to the town of Ephratah until 2012. Thus, the 0.34-mile (0.55 km) segment of New Turnpike Road between the county line and NY 10 has no reference markers. This segment of the route also lacks any shoulders. At NY 10, maintenance of NY 67 returns to NYSDOT as it turns north to overlap NY 10 into the hamlet of Ephratah.

In Ephratah, NY 67 splits from NY 10 and heads east as a narrow and winding highway. It continues into the town of Johnstown, where it meets the eastern terminus of the aforementioned New Turnpike Road (an unimproved town road) at Eppie Corners and winds through hilly terrain through the hamlet of Keck's Center. It intersects the north end of NY 334 before passing into the city of Johnstown. In the western part of the city, NY 67 follows West Main Street for several blocks to William Street, where it is joined by NY 29. After crossing downtown, the overlap with NY 29 ends with NY 29 continuing straight (east) on East Main Street and NY 67 veering southeast onto East State Street. The route exits the city just southeast of a junction with NY 30A. NY 67 proceeds onward, passing the Fulton County Airport, Hamilton–Fulton–Montgomery BOCES, and Fulton–Montgomery Community College before reentering Montgomery County.

=== Second pass through Montgomery County ===
Once again in Montgomery County, NY 67 follows a winding, narrow path. One steep curve was eliminated in the early 2000s northwest of Fort Johnson. In Fort Johnson, NY 67 joins NY 5 toward Amsterdam.

In Amsterdam, NY 67 enters with NY 5 as West Main Street. After passing an unusual flashing traffic light at Guy Park Manor, a four-lane highway begins parallel to Main Street. Historically, NY 5 and NY 67 followed Main Street through the city. With the 1977 creation of the Amsterdam Mall, NY 5 and NY 67, together with NY 30, were re-routed onto splits comprising the Amsterdam Arterial. After a left exit for NY 30 southbound and a link to the Thruway, NY 67 follows underneath NY 30 southbound, then takes a left exit next to the mall. NY 67 then follows NY 30 North, crossing NY 5 westbound, then splitting off toward Ballston Spa, passing through the hamlet of Manny Corners, south of the village of Hagaman.

=== Saratoga County ===
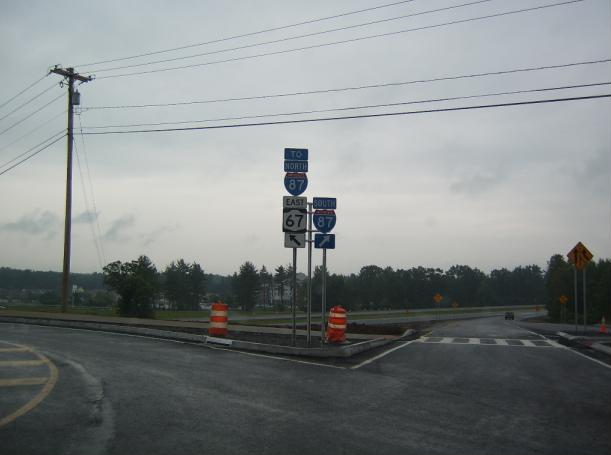
NY 67 at I-87

NY 67 enjoys a wider route, enabling faster driving and more gentle curves, passing south of the village of Galway. In Ballston Spa, NY 67 meets NY 50, turning south and overlapping for about a mile. NY 67 then splits off to the east, heading toward the Adirondack Northway at Malta.

In the Malta Area, NY 67 enters as Dunning Street. Immediately before Interstate 87 (I-87), there is a roundabout at State Farm Road. A second roundabout shortly thereafter handles the southbound ramp traffic of I-87 exit 12, with a third roundabout handling northbound on the other side. A fourth roundabout handles an intersection with Malta Commons and Kelch Drive, and a fifth handles the intersection with U.S. Route 9 (US 9), beginning the overlap with US 9.

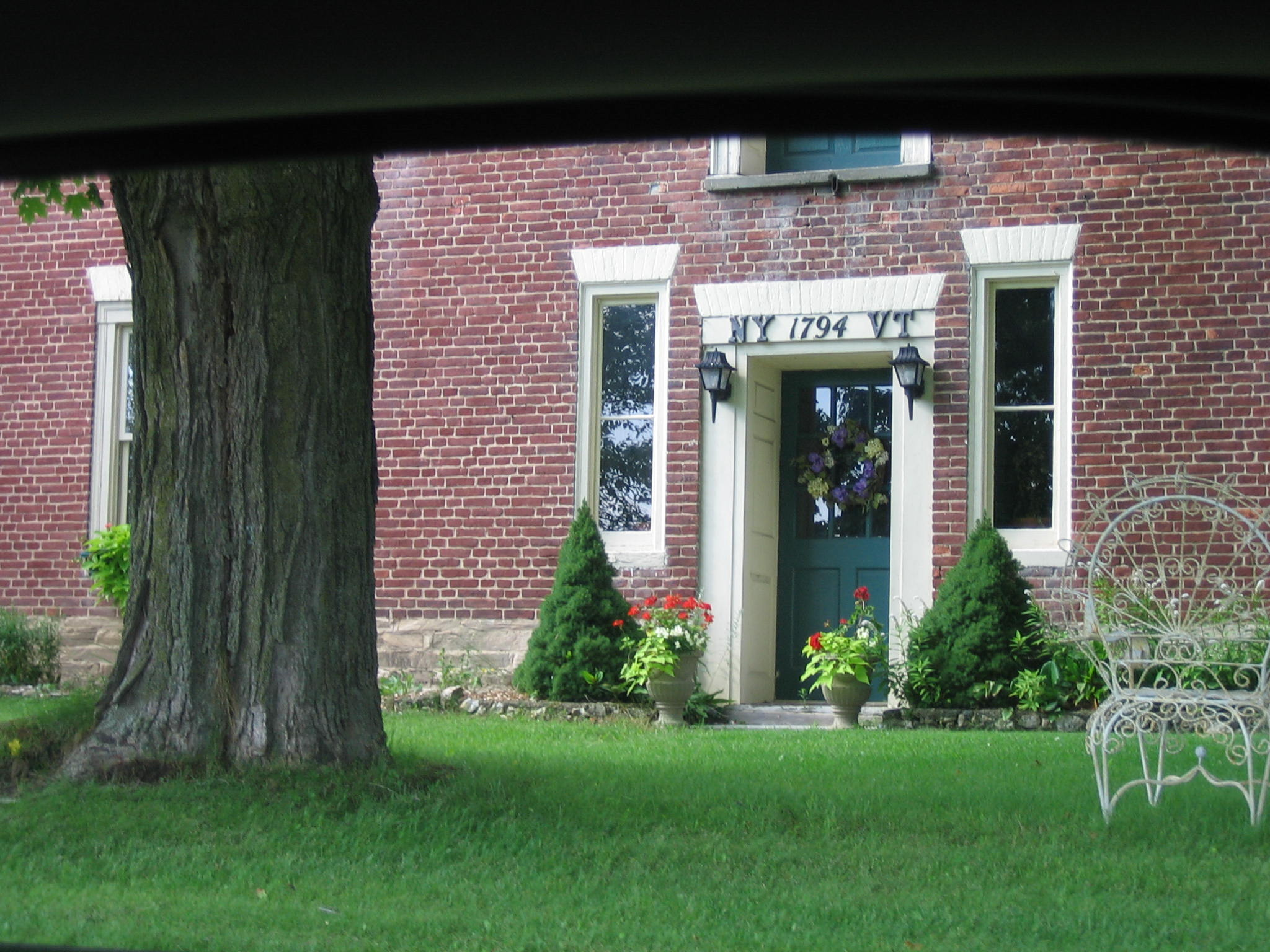
The David Mathews House, straddling the New York–Vermont state line located on NY–VT 67.

After the final roundabout, NY 67 turns south, concurrent with US 9 for 1.5 miles (2.4 km), just north of the village of Round Lake. Here, the route heads eastward, taking a winding path toward Mechanicville and the Hudson River. After entering the city, NY 67 becomes concurrent with US 4 and NY 32 for less than 0.1 miles (0.2 km), then heads east toward Schaghticoke, crossing the Hudson on the Mechanicville Bridge.

=== Rensselaer and Washington counties ===
Old Schaghticoke Road carries NY 67 eastward and uphill, meeting NY 40 as Reservoir Road. Turning left and overlapping, the routes enter Schaghticoke upon crossing the Hoosic River. Passing through the village, NY 67 splits right at the Schaghticoke Fairgrounds, where County Route 125 (CR 125), an old routing of NY 67, enters from the left. NY 67 turns to cross the Hoosic River again in Valley Falls, running south of the river through Buskirk and crossing again in Eagle Bridge to briefly enter Washington County.

NY 67 meets NY 22 in White Creek after 0.9 miles (1.4 km). Turning right, running concurrent for 0.6 miles (1.0 km), the paired routes re-enter Rensselaer County. Once back in Rensselaer County, the routes split at North Hoosick. Passing through farmland, NY 67 ends at the Vermont state line, continuing as VT 67.

== History ==
The portion of modern NY 67 between what is now NY 147 south of Galway and the southern end of the overlap with NY 50 south of Ballston Spa was originally designated as part of two legislative routes by the New York State Legislature in 1908. From Galway to Ballston Spa, what is now NY 67 was part of Route 37. The modern overlap with NY 50 was part of Route 25. In 1912, Route 37 was realigned between Kimball Corners and Saratoga Springs to use modern NY 29. Its former routing between Kimball Corners and Ballston Spa via Galway was redesignated as Route 37-a. Also added in 1912 was Route 37-b, a spur route that ran from Route 25 south of Ballston Spa east to what is now US 9 in Malta via current NY 67. The Route 37-a and Route 37-b designations were eliminated on March 1, 1921.

When the first set of posted routes in New York were assigned in 1924, the section of modern NY 67 between Round Lake and Mechanicville was designated as part of NY 6. Most of NY 6, including the section from Round Lake to Malta, was renumbered to US 9 in 1927. In the 1930 renumbering of state highways in New York, US 9 was realigned onto its modern alignment between Albany and Round Lake. Its former routing from Round Lake to Malta became part of the new NY 67, which extended west to NY 10 in Ephratah and east to the Vermont state line via Johnstown, Amsterdam, Ballston Spa, Stillwater, and Hoosick. From Galway to Malta, NY 67 utilized the former alignments of legislative Routes 25, 37-a and 37-b. Between Mechanicville and Schaghticoke, NY 67 initially ran concurrent with US 4 and NY 32 to Stillwater, where it turned east and followed what is now CR 125 across the Hudson River (via Stillwater Bridge) to NY 40 north of Schaghticoke in Rensselaer County.

On April 1, 1980, ownership and maintenance of NY 67 between the access road to lock 4 of the Champlain Canal and NY 40 was transferred from the state of New York to Rensselaer County as part of a highway maintenance swap between the two levels of government. One highway transferred from the county to the state at this time was Old Schaghticoke Road, which extended from the county line at Mechanicville east to NY 40 just southwest of Schaghticoke. NY 67 was realigned to follow the new state highway between Mechanicville and Schaghticoke while the county-maintained portion of its former alignment became CR 125. The short piece of NY 67's former routing between US 4 and NY 32 in Stillwater and the access road to Champlain Canal lock 4 remained state-maintained and became NY 915C, an unsigned reference route.

A second maintenance swap, this time between the state and Montgomery County, occurred on April 1, 1981. As part of the swap, ownership and maintenance of New Turnpike Road (CR 52) between NY 5 outside of St. Johnsville and the Fulton County line was transferred from Montgomery County to the state of New York. The new state highway became a westward extension of NY 67, which overlapped a section of NY 10 between Ephratah and NY 10's junction with New Turnpike Road. The 0.34-mile (0.55 km) section of New Turnpike Road between the Fulton County line and NY 10 was not transferred to the state and is still maintained by the town of Ephratah for several years. It was eventually transferred to NYSDOT in 2012

== Major intersections ==
County	Location	mi	km	Destinations	Notes
Montgomery	St. Johnsville	0.00	0.00	NY 5 (Mohawk Turnpike) – St. Johnsville, Nelliston	Western terminus
Fulton	Ephratah	6.11	9.83	NY 10 south (Ephratah Road) to I-90 Toll / New York Thruway	Southern terminus of NY 10 / NY 67 overlap
Fulton	Ephratah	7.74	12.46	NY 10 north – Caroga Lake, Dolgeville	Northern terminus of NY 10 / NY 67 overlap
Fulton	Town of Johnstown	14.98	24.11	NY 334 south	Northern terminus of NY 334
Fulton	City of Johnstown	16.66	26.81	NY 29 west (North Williams Street)	Western terminus of NY 29 / NY 67 overlap
Fulton	City of Johnstown	16.97	27.31	NY 29 east (East Main Street)	Eastern terminus of NY 29 / NY 67 overlap
Fulton	City of Johnstown	17.54	28.23	NY 30A (South Comrie Avenue) to I-90 Toll / New York Thruway – Fonda, Fultonville, Gloversville, Mayfield	
Montgomery	Fort Johnson	24.90	40.07	NY 5 west – Fonda	Western terminus of NY 5 / NY 67 overlap
Montgomery	City of Amsterdam	27.87	44.85	NY 5 east	Eastern terminus of NY 5 / NY 67 overlap
Montgomery	City of Amsterdam	27.94	44.97	NY 30 south to I-90 Toll / New York Thruway	Southern terminus of NY 30 / NY 67 overlap
Montgomery	City of Amsterdam	28.04	45.13	NY 5	
Montgomery	City of Amsterdam	28.15	45.30	NY 30 north (Market Street) – Broadalbin, Mayfield	Northern terminus of NY 30 / NY 67 overlap
Saratoga	Charlton	37.74	60.74	NY 147 (Sacandaga Road) – Galway, Scotia	
Saratoga	Ballston Spa	47.48	76.41	NY 50 north – Saratoga Springs	Northern terminus of NY 50 / NY 67 overlap
Saratoga	Ballston	48.37	77.84	NY 50 south – Clifton Park, Glenville, Scotia, Schenectady	Southern terminus of NY 50 / NY 67 overlap
Saratoga	Malta	51.70	83.20	I-87 – Albany, Montreal	Exit 12 (I-87); two roundabouts serve this interchange
Saratoga	Malta	52.15	83.93	US 9 north / CR 108 – Saratoga Springs, Saratoga Lake	Northern terminus of US 9 / NY 67 overlap; roundabout
Saratoga	Round Lake–Malta village/town line	53.73	86.47	US 9 south – Albany	Southern terminus of US 9 / NY 67 overlap; roundabout; northern terminus of Round Lake Bypass (unsigned NY 915J)
Saratoga	Round Lake–Malta village/town line	53.73	86.47	Round Lake Bypass (NY 915J) to I-87 south	Southern terminus of US 9 / NY 67 overlap; roundabout; northern terminus of Round Lake Bypass (unsigned NY 915J)
Saratoga	Mechanicville	60.03	96.61	US 4 south / NY 32 south to NY 146	Western terminus of US 4 / NY 32 / NY 67 overlap
Saratoga	Mechanicville	60.13	96.77	US 4 north / NY 32 north	Eastern terminus of US 4 / NY 32 / NY 67 overlap
Rensselaer	Town of Schaghticoke	66.13	106.43	NY 40 south – Troy	Western terminus of NY 40 / NY 67 overlap
Rensselaer	Village of Schaghticoke	67.68	108.92	NY 40 north – Middle Falls	Eastern terminus of NY 40 / NY 67 overlap
Washington	White Creek	80.00	128.75	NY 22 north – Cambridge	Western terminus of NY 22 / NY 67 overlap
Rensselaer	Hoosick	82.49	132.75	NY 22 south – Hoosick Falls	Hamlet of North Hoosick; eastern terminus of NY 22 / NY 67 overlap
Rensselaer	Hoosick	86.55	139.29	VT 67 east – North Bennington	Continuation into Vermont
1.000 mi = 1.609 km; 1.000 km = 0.621 mi: Concurrency terminus

== See also ==
- List of county routes in Rensselaer County, New York
