= Vermont Route 11 =

Highway in Vermont

Vermont Route 11
- VT 11 highlighted in red

Route information
- Maintained by VTrans
- Length: 42.154 mi (67.840 km)
- Existed: 1922–present

Major junctions
- West end: VT 7A / VT 30 in Manchester
- US 7 in Manchester; VT 100 in Londonderry; I-91 in Springfield
- East end: NH 11 at the New Hampshire state line in Charlestown, NH

Location
- Country: United States
- State: Vermont
- Counties: Bennington, Windham, Windsor

Highway system
- State highways in Vermont
← VT 10A	→ VT 12
← Route 10	N.E.	→ Route 12

Vermont Route 11 (VT 11) is a 42.154-mile-long (67.840 km) east–west state highway in Vermont, United States. The western end of the highway is at VT 7A in Manchester. The eastern end is at the New Hampshire border at the Cheshire Bridge over the Connecticut River, connecting Springfield and Charlestown, New Hampshire. The route continues into New Hampshire as New Hampshire Route 11, and then following that into Maine as Maine State Route 11. The three Routes 11, totaling 551.7 miles (887.9 km) in length, were once part of the New England Interstate system.

== Route description ==
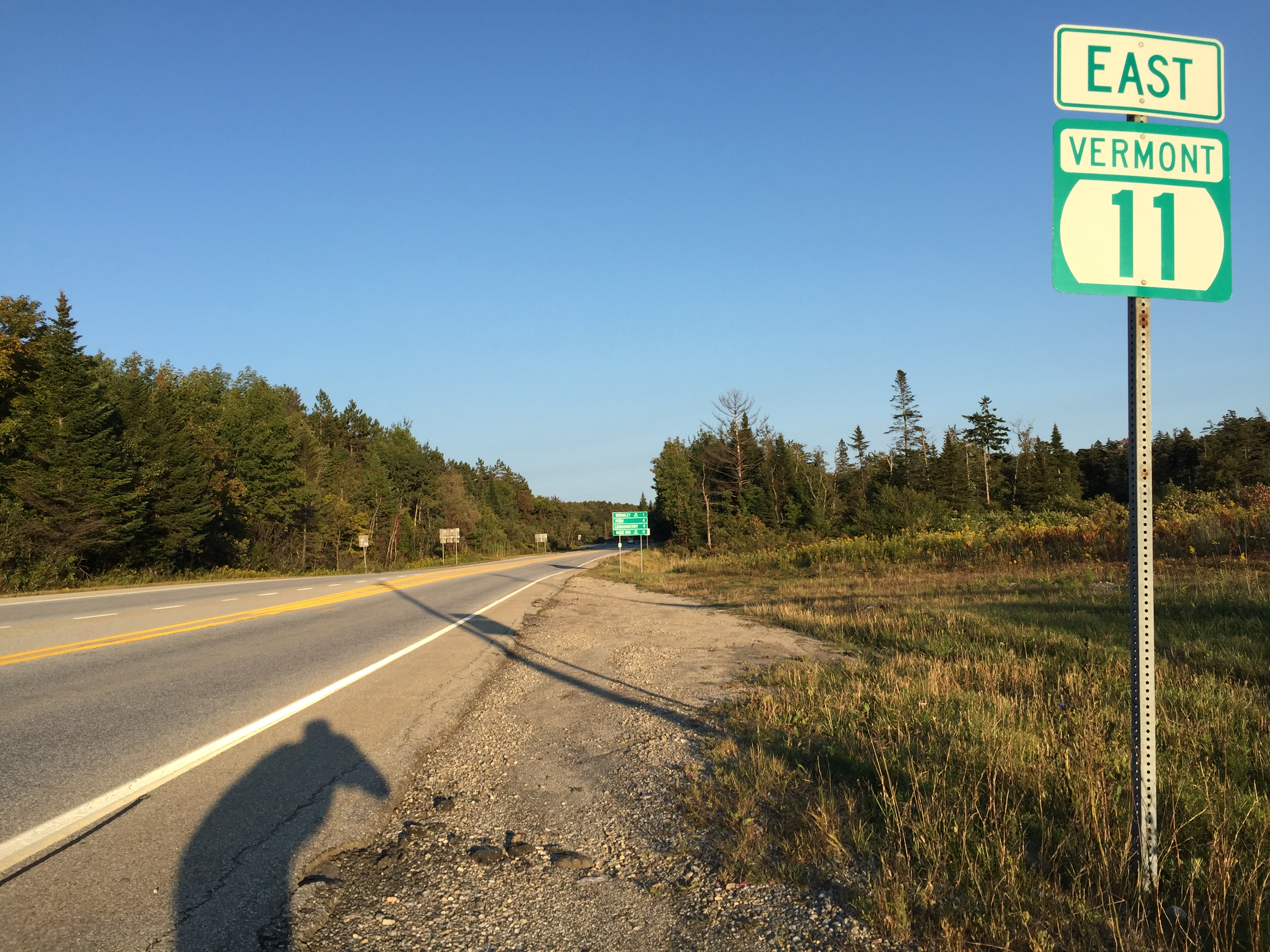
View east along VT 11 at its split from VT 30 in Winhall

VT 11 begins as Depot Street at an intersection with VT 7A and VT 30 in Manchester Center within the Batten Kill river valley at the edge of the Green Mountains. It proceeds eastward across railroad tracks and the US 7 expressway, intersecting it at Exit 4. VT 11 and VT 30 then proceed northeast and east following along the path of Bromley Brook for another five miles (8.0 km) into the northern edge of the town of Winhall, where VT 30 then separates to the southeast. VT 11 continues on its eastward track, passing through the Big Bromley Ski Area and town center of Peru, on its way to the town center of Londonderry. In Londonderry center, VT 11 is known as North Main Street and has a junction and short overlap with VT 100.

VT 11 continues past Londonderry center, passing by the Magic Mountain Ski Area, towards the village of North Windham. From here, VT 11 turns northward, entering the town of Andover, following the path of the Middle Branch Williams River. VT 11 follows the river for about eight miles (13 km), as it turns eastward again in the village of Simonsville and continues towards the town center of Chester. In Chester center, VT 11 runs along Main Street, South Main Street, and Pleasant Street, overlapping with VT 103. After crossing the main Williams River, VT 11 heads east for three miles (4.8 km) then enters the town of Springfield. Within the urban compact of Springfield, VT 11 uses Chester Road, River Street, Main Street, and Clinton Street. VT 11 continues past the urban area following the Black River towards the Connecticut River as a 4 lane, undivided surface arterial. About a mile before reaching the Connecticut River, VT 11 is joined by U.S. Route 5 for about 0.8 miles (1.3 km), with an interchange with I-91. After US 5 separates, VT 11 continues east for another 0.02 miles (32 m), reverting to 2 lanes, one each way, before ending at the Cheshire Bridge at the New Hampshire state line. The road continues into New Hampshire as New Hampshire Route 11.

== History ==
A portion of modern VT 11 in the town of Winhall was part of an early toll road known as the Peru Turnpike.

In 1922, the six New England states adopted a uniform road marking system that assigned route numbers from 1 to 99 for inter-state routes. VT 11 was originally assigned its designation as part of New England Interstate Route 11, which ran 173 miles (278 km) between New England Route 4 in Manchester, Vermont and New England Route 1 in Biddeford, Maine. Vermont formally established its state highway system in 1931, at which time the state took over maintenance of the western two-thirds of the route, between Manchester Center and Chester center, as well as the portion in Springfield along the Black River. The section from Chester center to Springfield center remained a town-maintained road until being transferred to the state in 1941.

VT 11 was extended south from Manchester Center to the New York state line west of Arlington by 1938, replacing VT 123. The portion of VT 11 between the state line and Arlington was co-designated as VT 313 from New York to Arlington by 1940, leading to the truncation of VT 11 back to Manchester Center between 1947 and 1952.

== Major intersections ==
County	Location	mi	km	Destinations	Notes
Bennington	Manchester	0.000	0.000	VT 7A / VT 30 north – Manchester Village, Dorset, Poultney	Roundabout; western terminus; western end of VT 30 concurrency; former US 7
Bennington	Manchester	1.317– 1.556	2.120– 2.504	US 7 – Rutland, Bennington	Partial cloverleaf interchange; exit 4 on US 7
Bennington	Winhall	6.403	10.305	VT 30 south – Stratton Mountain Ski Area, Brattleboro	Eastern end of VT 30 concurrency
Windham	Londonderry	14.755	23.746	VT 100 south – South Londonderry, Brattleboro	Western end of VT 100 concurrency
Windham	Londonderry	15.169	24.412	VT 100 north – Weston, Ludlow	Eastern end of VT 100 concurrency
Windham	Londonderry	19.421	31.255	VT 121 east – Grafton	Western terminus of VT 121
Windsor	Chester	29.537	47.535	VT 35 south (Grafton Street) – Grafton	Northern terminus of VT 35
Windsor	Chester	29.629	47.683	VT 103 north – Ludlow, Rutland	Western end of VT 103 concurrency
Windsor	Chester	30.016	48.306	VT 103 south (South Main Street) to I-91 – Rockingham	Eastern end of VT 103 concurrency
Windsor	Springfield	37.137	59.766	VT 106 north (South Street) – North Springfield, Woodstock, Rutland	Southern terminus of VT 106
Windsor	Springfield	37.761	60.770	VT 143 east (Summer Street)	Western terminus of VT 143
Windsor	Springfield	41.330	66.514	US 5 south (Missing Link Road) – Bellows Falls	Western end of US 5 concurrency
Windsor	Springfield	41.389– 41.756	66.609– 67.200	I-91 – White River Junction, Brattleboro	Partial cloverleaf interchange; exit 7 on I-91
Windsor	Springfield	42.134	67.808	US 5 north (Connecticut River Road) – Weathersfield Bow	Eastern end of US 5 concurrency
Windsor	Springfield	42.154	67.840	NH 11 east – Charlestown	Continuation into New Hampshire
1.000 mi = 1.609 km; 1.000 km = 0.621 mi: Concurrency terminus
