= North Bennington, Vermont =

- Village
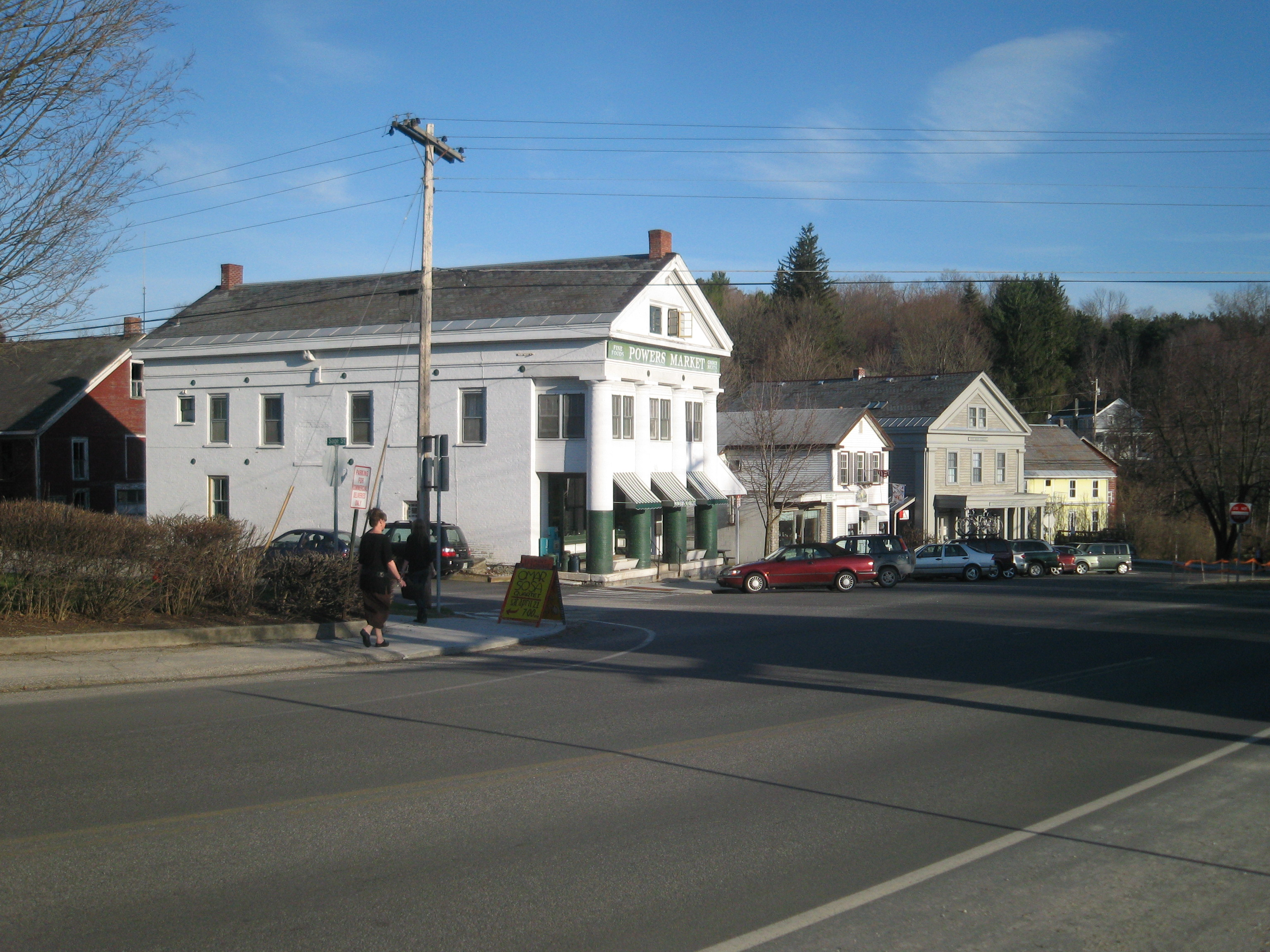
- Street scene in North Bennington

- Location within the state of Vermont
- Coordinates: 42°55′16″N 73°14′43″W
- Country: United States
- State: Vermont
- County: Bennington

Area
  - Total: 1.90 sq mi (4.92 km^{2})
  - Land: 1.87 sq mi (4.85 km^{2})
  - Water: 0.027 sq mi (0.07 km^{2})
- Elevation: 692 ft (211 m)

Population (2020)
  - Total: 1,716
  - Density: 916/sq mi (353.8/km^{2})
- Time zone: UTC-5 (Eastern (EST))
  - Summer (DST): UTC-4 (EDT)
- ZIP code: 05257
- Area code: 802
- FIPS code: 50-49075
- GNIS feature ID: 2378319
- Website: northbennington.org/village/
- North Bennington Historic District
- U.S. National Register of Historic Places
- U.S. Historic district
- Location: VT 67 and VT 67A, North Bennington, Vermont
- Coordinates: 42°55′48″N 73°14′35″W
- Architectural style: Greek Revival, Italianate
- NRHP reference No.: 80000328
- Added to NRHP: August 29, 1980

North Bennington is an incorporated village in the town of Bennington in Bennington County, Vermont, United States. The population was 1,716 at the 2020 census.

== History ==
The North Bennington Historic District was added to the National Register of Historic Places in 1980. The district covers an area of 112 acres (0.45 km^{2}) and includes 164 contributing buildings and two contributing sites. It is home to the Park-McCullough Historic House, a well-preserved, 35-room, Victorian country house. The H.C. White site, at the southern end of the village, was added to the Register in 2009.

== Geography ==
North Bennington is located in the northwest part of the town of Bennington and is bordered to the north by the town of Shaftsbury. The southern border of the village follows the Walloomsac River. Vermont Route 67 passes through the village, leading northeast to South Shaftsbury and west to the New York state line, where it becomes New York State Route 67, continuing on to North Hoosick. Vermont Route 67A intersects VT 67 in the center of North Bennington and leads southeast to downtown Bennington.

North Bennington's boundary with Bennington cuts across the grounds of Bennington College.

Bennington College occupies a hill on the southeast border of the village. The village is also home to two independent grade schools, The Village School of North Bennington (grades pre-K-6) and the progressive Southshire Community School (grades K-8).

According to the United States Census Bureau, the village has a total area of 1.89 square miles (4.89 km^{2}), of which 1.86 square miles (4.82 km^{2}) is land and 0.027 square miles (0.07 km^{2}), or 1.40%, is water.

== Demographics ==
Historical population
Census	Pop.	Note	%±
1900	670		—
1910	663		−1.0%
1920	818		23.4%
1930	933		14.1%
1940	992		6.3%
1950	1,327		33.8%
1960	1,437		8.3%
1970	984		−31.5%
1980	1,685		71.2%
1990	1,520		−9.8%
2000	1,428		−6.1%
2010	1,643		15.1%
2020	1,716		4.4%
U.S. Decennial Census

=== 2020 census ===
As of the 2020 census, North Bennington had a population of 1,716. The median age was 23.1 years. 13.7% of residents were under the age of 18 and 18.1% of residents were 65 years of age or older. For every 100 females there were 74.0 males, and for every 100 females age 18 and over there were 70.6 males age 18 and over.

98.5% of residents lived in urban areas, while 1.5% lived in rural areas.

There were 462 households in North Bennington, of which 22.9% had children under the age of 18 living in them. Of all households, 41.8% were married-couple households, 17.3% were households with a male householder and no spouse or partner present, and 32.5% were households with a female householder and no spouse or partner present. About 34.6% of all households were made up of individuals and 19.7% had someone living alone who was 65 years of age or older.

There were 520 housing units, of which 11.2% were vacant. The homeowner vacancy rate was 2.5% and the rental vacancy rate was 7.5%.

Racial composition as of the 2020 census
Race	Number	Percent
White	1,430	83.3%
Black or African American	47	2.7%
American Indian and Alaska Native	7	0.4%
Asian	72	4.2%
Native Hawaiian and Other Pacific Islander	0	0.0%
Some other race	51	3.0%
Two or more races	109	6.4%
Hispanic or Latino (of any race)	105	6.1%

=== 2010 census ===
At the 2010 census, there were 1,643 people, 464 households and 263 families residing in the village. The population density was 864.7 per square mile (342.3/km^{2}). There were 510 housing units at an average density of 283.3/sq mi (106.3/km^{2}). The racial makeup was 95.5% White, 3.0% African American, 0.7% Native American, 2.0% Asian, 0.1% Pacific Islander, 1.2% from other races, and 2.3% from two or more races. Hispanic or Latino of any race were 2.0% of the population.

There were 464 households, of which 25.6% had children under the age of 18 living with them, 44.2% were couples living together and joined in either marriage or civil union, 8.2% had a female householder with no husband present, 4.3% had a male householder with no female present, and 43.3% were non-families. 43.3% of all households were made up of individuals, and 19.4% had someone living alone who was 65 years of age or older. The average household size was 2.23 and the average family size was 2.90.

29.6% of the population were under the age of 19, 24.0% from 20 to 24, 19.7% from 25 to 44, 13.8% from 45 to 64, and 19.4% who were 65 years of age or older. The median age was 29 years. For every 100 females, there were 73.5 males. For every 100 females age 18 and over, there were 67.3 males.

The median household income was $39,861 and the median family income was $61,875. Males had a median income of $26,250 and females $29,063. The per capita income was $19,774. About 3.5% of families and 20.0% of the population were below the poverty line, including 6.5% of those under age 18 and 4.7% of those age 65 or over.

== Economy ==
North Bennington is home to several manufacturing companies, including Dion Snowshoes, National Hanger Company, PortaBrace and Sterling Gun Drills.

== Education ==
The village is served by the McCullough Free Library, a member of the Catamount Library Network.

== Transportation ==
=== Highways ===
North Bennington is crossed by:

- VT Route 67
- VT Route 67A

=== Bus ===
Local public transportation by bus is provided by the Green Mountain Express' Brown Line on weekdays.

=== Rail ===
Until 1953 the Rutland Railroad ran passenger trains Green Mountain Flyer and Mount Royal through North Bennington.

VTrans and NYSDOT have shown interest in restoring passenger train service to North Bennington on a new Amtrak route between Albany and Burlington via Rutland, also linking up nearby Mechanicville, New York and Manchester, Vermont. The new train would share much of its route with the Ethan Allen Express, likely running beyond Albany to New York City. As of 2021, the idea is listed simply as a "potential initiative" in the Vermont Rail Plan.

== Notable people ==
- Hiland Hall, U.S. congressman from Vermont
- Shirley Jackson, author (The Lottery, The Haunting of Hill House), lived and died in North Bennington.
- Jamaica Kincaid, author (Lucy); lived in North Bennington
- John G. McCullough, 49th Governor of Vermont
