= Bennington (CDP), Vermont =

Census-designated place in Vermont, United States

Bennington, Vermont
- Census-designated place
- Location within Vermont
- Coordinates: 42°52′40″N 73°11′06″W
- Country: United States
- State: Vermont
- County: Bennington
- Town: Bennington

Area
  - Total: 4.84 sq mi (12.53 km^{2})
  - Land: 4.80 sq mi (12.44 km^{2})
  - Water: 0.035 sq mi (0.09 km^{2})
- Elevation: 735 ft (224 m)

Population (2010)
  - Total: 9,074
  - Density: 1,890/sq mi (729.7/km^{2})
- Time zone: UTC-5 (Eastern (EST))
  - Summer (DST): UTC-4 (EDT)
- ZIP code: 05201
- Area code: 802
- FIPS code: 50-04750
- GNIS feature ID: 2378120

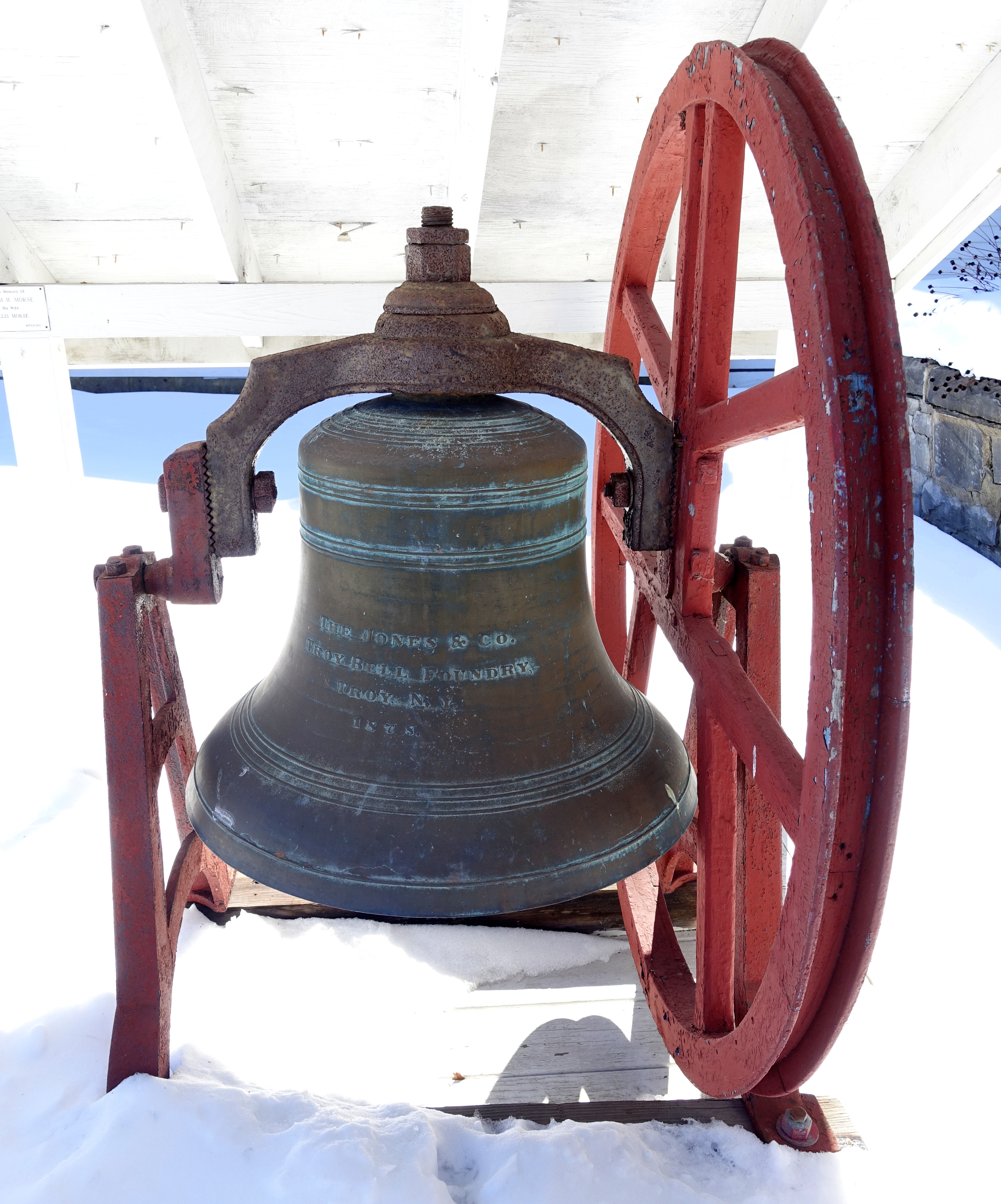
Bell manufactured by The Jones & Co. Troy Bell Foundry, Bennington, Vermont, USA

Bennington is a census-designated place (CDP) in Bennington County, Vermont, United States. It is located entirely within the town of Bennington. The population of the CDP was 9,074 at the 2010 census, or 57.6% of the population of the entire town.

== Geography ==
The Bennington CDP comprises the downtown area of the town of Bennington, ranging from the Walloomsac River/Roaring Branch/Walloomsac Brook on the north, to the village of Old Bennington and Monument Avenue on the west, to Jewett Brook, Morgan Street, South Stream Road and Gore Road on the south, and to the Woodford town line on the east. According to the United States Census Bureau, the CDP has a total area of 4.84 square miles (12.53 km^{2}), of which 4.80 square miles (12.44 km^{2}) is land and 0.035 square miles (0.09 km^{2}), or 0.74%, is water.

== Demographics ==
As of the census of 2010, there were 9,074 people, 3,833 households, and 2,145 families residing in the CDP. The population density was 720.2 people/km^{2} (1,865 people/mi^{2}). There were 4,122 housing units at an average density of 327.1 units/km^{2} (847 units/mi^{2}). The racial makeup of the CDP was 96.2% White, 1.0% Black or African American, 0.5% Native American, 0.6% Asian, 0.1% Pacific Islander, 0.4% from other races, and 1.3% from two or more races. Hispanic or Latino of any race were 1.7% of the population. There were 3,833 households, out of which 25.3% had children under the age of 18 living with them, 36.1% were married couples living together, 14.8% had a female householder with no husband present, and 44.0% were non-families. 27.7% of all households were made up of individuals with someone under the age of 18 living with them, and 29.0% had someone living alone who was 65 years of age or older. The average household size was 2.22 and the average family size was 2.85. In the CDP, the population was spread out, with 23.1% under the age of 19, 6.2% from 20 to 24, 23.2% from 25 to 44, 27.2% from 45 to 64, and 20.3% who were 65 years of age or older. The median age was 43 years. For every 100 females, there were 89.7 males. For every 100 females age 18 and over, there were 87.2 males. The median income for a household in the CDP was $38,803, and the median income for a family was $50,805. Males had a median income of $30,451 versus $22,135 for females. The per capita income for the CDP was $25,285. About 13.1% of families and 13.0% of the population were below the poverty line, including 19.4% of those under age 18 and 7.6% of those age 65 or over.
