= List of the oldest buildings in Vermont =

This article attempts to list the oldest buildings in the state of Vermont in the United States of America, including the oldest houses in Vermont and any other surviving structures from the eighteenth century period or the oldest of its type. Some dates are approximate and based on architectural studies and historical records, other dates are based on dendrochronology. All entries should include citation with reference to: architectural features; a report by an architectural historian; or dendrochronology.

== List ==
Building	Location	First Built	Notes
Mooar-Wright House	Pownal, Vermont	c. 1750-1767	Possibly the oldest house in Vermont and possible Dutch influence. Date not yet verified with dendrochronology.
Jedidiah Dewey House	Bennington, Vermont	c.a 1763-1765	Oldest house in Bennington, built for minister Possibly oldest in Vermont.
Elias Olcott House	Rockingham, Vermont	c. 1763	Oldest house in Rockingham; located in the City Dale neighborhood
Governor Hunt House	Vernon, Vermont	1764	Built by Jonathan Hunt in 1764. He was a Vermont pioneer and served as the state's second lieutenant governor. The house was dated through dendrochronology research in 2022. The oldest house in Vermont verified through dendrochronology.
William Harris House (Brattleboro, Vermont)	Brattleboro, Vermont	c. 1768	Possibly the oldest house in Vermont; Date not yet verified with dendrochronology.
Henry House (Bennington, Vermont)	Bennington, Vermont	1769	Reomodeled in 1798
The Walloomsac Inn	Bennington, Vermont	1771	Oldest inn in Vermont
Jehiel and Mary Webb House	Rockingham, Vermont	1775	second oldest house in Rockingham; located at 7 Meeting House Rd., Rockingham Village. also purported to be David Pulsifer Inn, which would make the building 10 years older
Old Constitution House	Windsor, Vermont	prior to 1777	birthplace of the Vermont Republic and the Constitution of the State of Vermont
Dutton House	Shelburne, Vermont	1782	Moved to grounds of Shelburne Museum from Cavendish, Vermont.
Hyde Log Cabin	Grand Isle, Vermont	1783	One of the oldest log cabins in U.S.
Gov. Jonas Galusha Homestead	Shaftsbury Center, Vermont	1783	well-preserved example of Federal period architecture
Eureka Schoolhouse	Springfield, Vermont	1785	Oldest schoolhouse in Vermont
Ethan Allen Homestead	Burlington, Vermont	1787	Home of Ethan Allen
Rockingham Meeting House	Rockingham, Vermont	1787-1801	Oldest church building in Vermont.
Rokeby	Ferrisburgh, Vermont	1780s	located on a 90-acre farm
Pearl House	Burlington, Vermont	1789	Oldest building in Burlington
Maple Hill Farm	Norwich, Vermont	c. 1789	Georgian farmhouse built by Peter Olcott; complex includes two contemporaneous English barns
Ye Olde Tavern, Vermont	Manchester Center, Vermont	1790	Oldest operating inn in Vermont
Old Stone House (Winooski, Vermont)	Winooski, Vermont	1790	Oldest house in Winooski
Dakin Family Farm House	Ferrisburgh, Vermont	1792	Originally Built by Timothy Dakin of the Dakin Farm family
Hathaway's Tavern	St. Albans (city), Vermont	1793	Oldest building in St. Albans
John Strong Mansion Museum	Addison, Vermont	1795	Construction started by 1795.
Warren Cottle House	South Woodstock, Vermont	1796	Construction started by 1796.
Farrar-Mansur House	Weston, Vermont	1797	Open as a museum
Grasse Mount	Burlington, Vermont	1804	Oldest campus building standing in its original form at the University of Vermont (the original oldest building, "Old Mill" was destroyed by fire in 1824, and reconstructed the next year).
Pulp Mill Covered Bridge	Middlebury and Weybridge, Vermont	c. 1808-1850	Oldest covered bridge in Vermont
Juniper Island Light	Juniper Island	1846	Oldest light house in Vermont

== See also ==
- Oldest buildings in America
- Timeline of architectural styles
