= State Route 346 (New York–Vermont) =

Highway in New York and Vermont, US

Route 346

Route information
- Maintained by NYSDOT and VTrans
- Length: 7.25 mi (11.67 km): NY 346: 2.62 mi; VT 346: 4.628 mi
- History: NY 346 assigned 1930; VT 346 designated VT 112 by 1926; renumbered to VT 346 in late 1930s

Major junctions
- West end: NY 22 in Petersburgh, NY
- South end: US 7 in Pownal, VT

Location
- Country: United States
- State: New York
- Counties: NY: Rensselaer; VT: Bennington

Highway system
- New York Highways; Interstate; US; State; Reference; Parkways
- State highways in Vermont
← NY 345	NY	→ NY 347
← VT 315	VT	→ VT F-1

New York State Route 346 (NY 346) and Vermont Route 346 (VT 346) are short, adjoining state highways in the northeastern United States. Together, they extend for a combined 7.25 miles (11.67 km) through the towns of Petersburgh in Rensselaer County, New York, and Pownal in Bennington County, Vermont. The bi-state highway begins at an intersection with NY 22 in the hamlet of North Petersburgh and heads generally southeastward across the New York–Vermont state line to a junction with U.S. Route 7 (US 7) in the village of Pownal. Both NY 346 and VT 346 parallel the Hoosick River.

The Vermont portion of the highway was originally designated as Vermont Route 112 by 1926. The New York continuation was assigned NY 346 as part of the 1930 renumbering of state highways in New York, and VT 112 was renumbered to VT 346 in the late 1930s to match the designation on the New York side. VT 346, the longer of the two routes at 4.628 miles (7.448 km) in length, is currently the highest-numbered state highway in Vermont.

== Route description ==
=== NY 346 ===
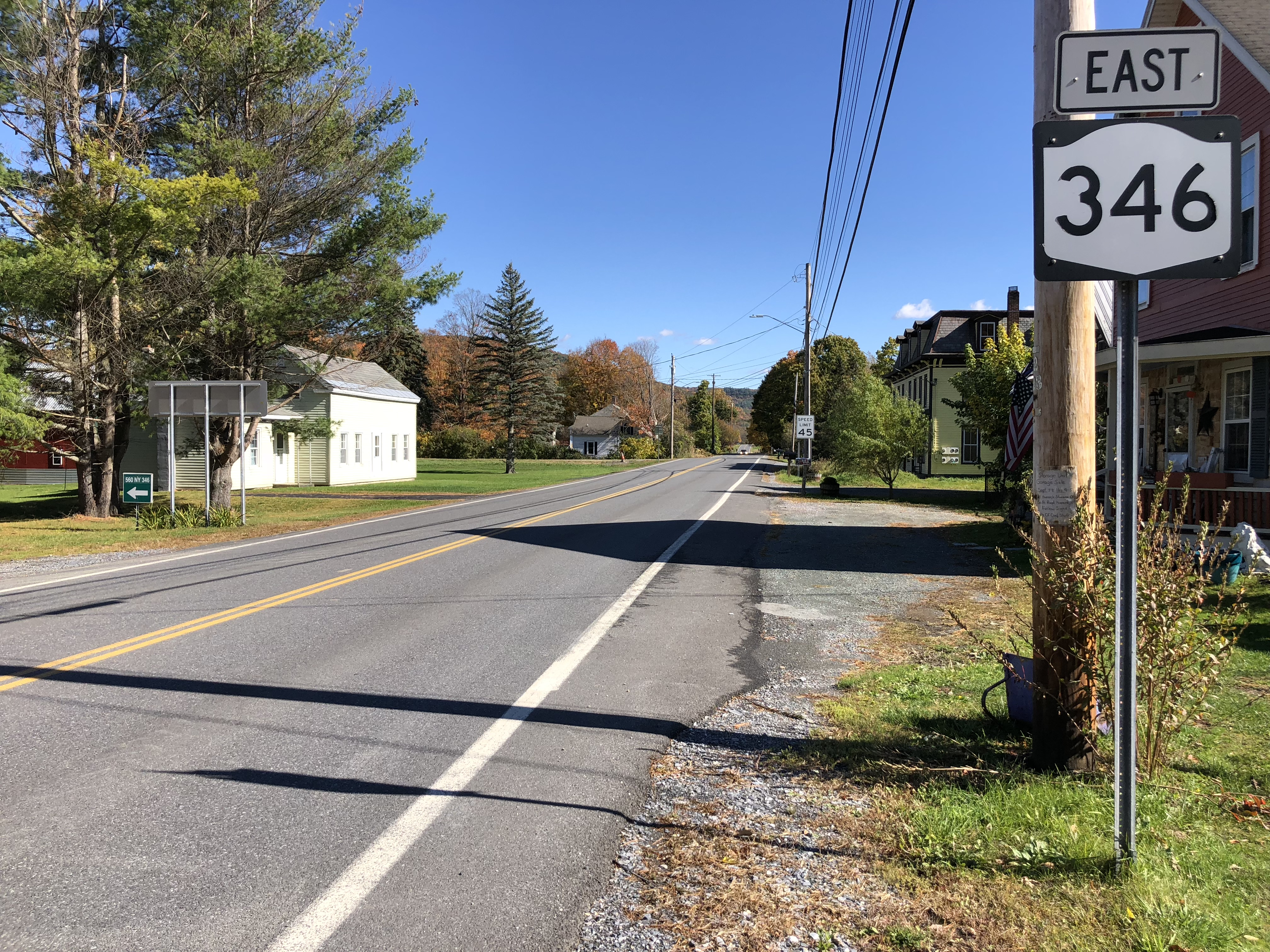
View east along NY 346 at NY 22 in North Petersburgh

NY 346 begins at an intersection with NY 22 southeast of the Rensselaer County State Forest in North Petersburgh, a hamlet within the town of Petersburgh. The route heads eastward out of the hamlet, crossing over the Little Hoosick River just east of North Petersburgh before following the Hoosic River eastward along the base of a valley surrounding the river. About 0.5 miles (0.8 km) east of the hamlet, NY 346 meets County Route 95 (CR 95), the only through road that NY 346 intersects between NY 22 and the Vermont state line. Past CR 95, NY 346 turns southeastward, paralleling both the Hoosick River and CR 96 on the other side of the river to the Vermont state line, where the highway becomes VT 346. Unlike NY 346, which is posted with east–west cardinal directions, VT 346 is signed as north–south.

=== VT 346 ===
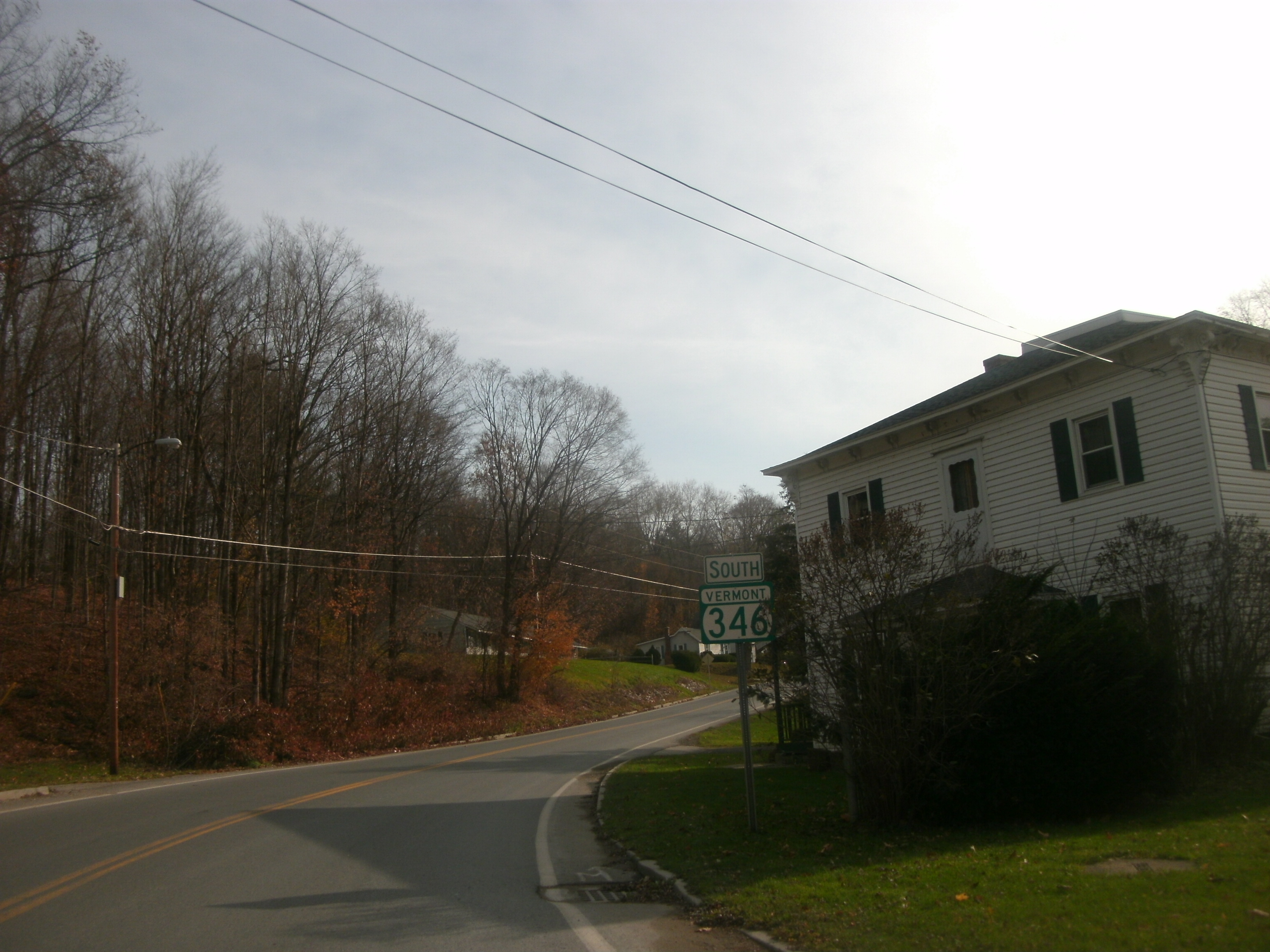
VT 346 in Pownal

While NY 346 follows the southern bank of the Hoosic River, VT 346 largely runs along the northern bank. The switch in positioning is made just east of the state line, where VT 346 crosses over the waterway. The route continues eastward, intersecting Indian Massacre Road, the continuation of CR 96, and crossing a Pan Am Railways-owned railroad line on its way to a junction with Lime Kiln Road, a local highway leading to the village of Pownal Center. At this point, VT 346 turns southward into the village of North Pownal. The route heads generally north–south through the community, running alongside both the Hoosic River and the Pan Am Railways line.

South of North Pownal, VT 346 heads through a more rural area of the town of Pownal, passing by farmland and open fields as it follows the river and the railroad toward the village of Pownal. Roughly 1 mile (1.6 km) north of the community, VT 346 also begins to follow US 7 (the Ethan Allen Highway), which runs parallel to VT 346 farther up the side of the river valley. US 7 descends the valley into Pownal, where both US 7 and VT 346 follow north–south routings through the small village. The two routes meet at a junction southeast of the village center, at which point VT 346 comes to an end. The average annual daily traffic of VT 346 is highest in Pownal, where the route handles around 2,800 cars per day as of 2012, and lowest between Church Street and Dean Road, where it dips to about 1,600 vehicles per day.

== History ==
The portion of the North Petersburgh–Pownal highway within the state of Vermont was originally designated as VT 112 by 1926. Its continuation into the state of New York was designated as NY 346 as part of the 1930 renumbering of state highways in New York. VT 112 was renumbered to VT 346 in the late 1930s to match the New York designation.

== Major intersections ==
State	County	Location	mi	km	Destinations	Notes
New York	Rensselaer	Petersburgh	0.00	0.00	NY 22 – Petersburgh, Hoosick Falls	Western terminus; hamlet of North Petersburgh
Hoosic River; New York–Vermont state line			2.62 0.000	4.22 0.000	Roadway becomes NY 346 westbound and VT 346 eastbound	
Vermont	Bennington	Pownal	4.628	7.448	US 7 – Pownal Ctr., Bennington, Williamstown MA	Southern terminus
1.000 mi = 1.609 km; 1.000 km = 0.621 mi: Concurrency terminus
