= North Pownal, Vermont =

Census-designated place in Vermont, United States

- Census-designated place
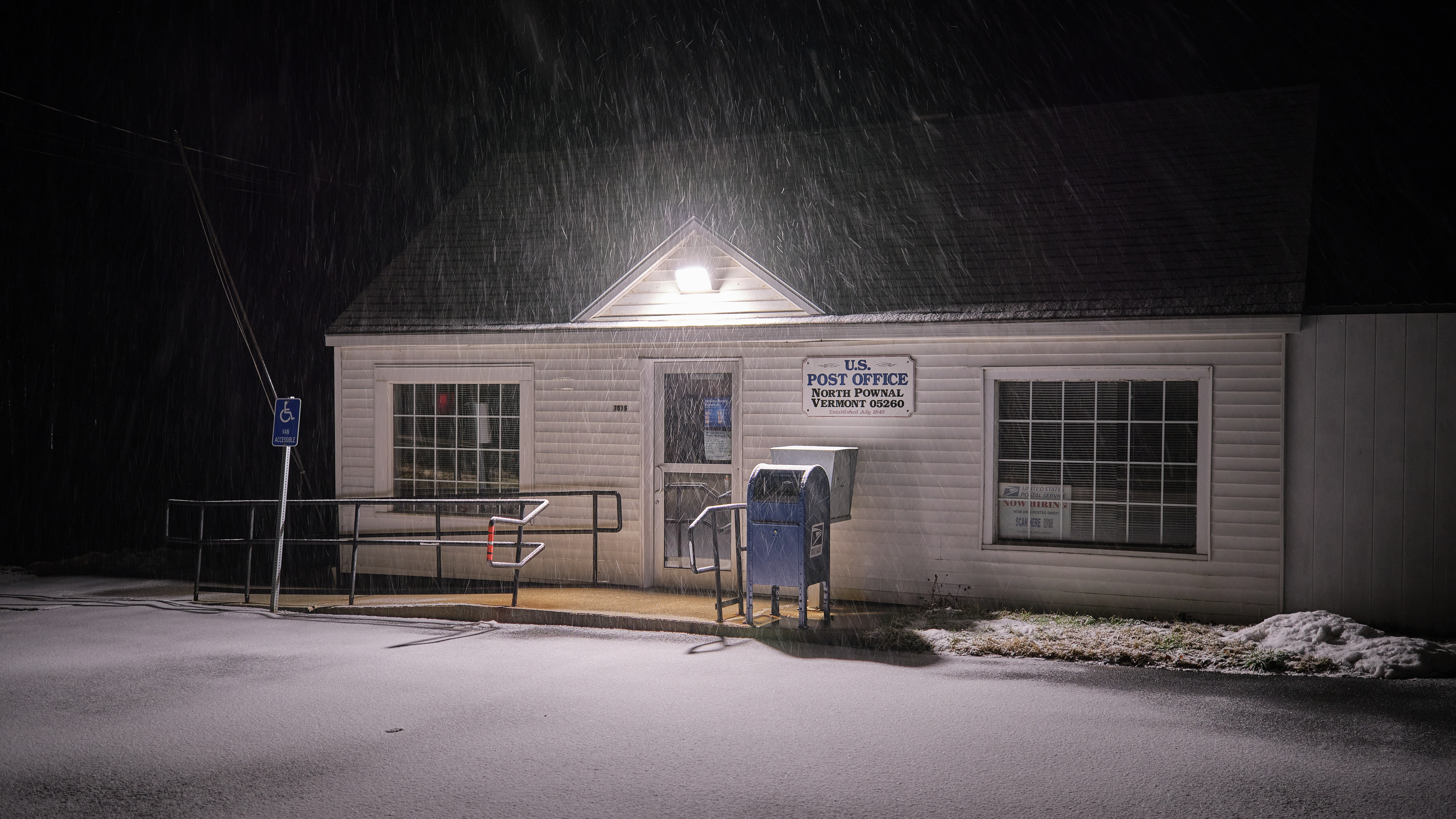
- Post office

- Location within Vermont Location within the United States
- Coordinates: 42°47′48″N 73°15′23″W
- Country: United States
- State: Vermont
- County: Bennington
- Town: Pownal

Area
  - Total: 1.21 sq mi (3.14 km^{2})
  - Land: 1.19 sq mi (3.08 km^{2})
  - Water: 0.019 sq mi (0.05 km^{2})
- Elevation: 755 ft (230 m)
- Time zone: UTC-5 (Eastern (EST))
  - Summer (DST): UTC-4 (EDT)
- ZIP Code: 05260
- Area code: 802
- FIPS code: 50-51325
- GNIS feature ID: 2807123

North Pownal is an unincorporated community and census-designated place (CDP) in the town of Pownal, Bennington County, Vermont, United States. As of the 2020 census, North Pownal had a population of 303. It was first listed as a CDP prior to the 2020 census.

The community is in southwestern Bennington County, in the western part of the town of Pownal, 1 mile (1.6 km) east of the Vermont–New York border. The Hoosic River, a west-flowing tributary of the Hudson River, flows through the center of the community. Vermont Route 346 is the main road through the village, leading southeast 3 miles (5 km) to U.S. Route 7 at Pownal village. To the northwest, VT 346/NY 346 leads 4 miles (6 km) to North Petersburg, New York.
