= Meeting House Farm =

- U.S. National Register of Historic Places
- Location within Vermont Location within the United States
- Location: 128 Union Village Rd., Norwich, Vermont
- Coordinates: 43°43′42″N 72°18′36″W
- Area: 90 acres (36 ha)
- Built: c. 1788
- NRHP reference No.: 100005061
- Added to NRHP: March 16, 2020

The Meeting House Farm is a historic farm property at 128 Union Village Road in Norwich, Vermont. Encompassing more than 90 acres (36 ha) of woodlands and pasture, the farm has more than 200 years of architectural history, including a late 18th-century farmhouse and an early 19th-century barn. The property was listed on the National Register of Historic Places in 2020.

== Description and history ==
Meeting House Farm is located in a rural setting in northern Norwich, with the main farm complex located on the east side of Union Village Road, about 1 mile (1.6 km) north of the Norwich village center. The farm house is a well crafted Georgian structure, two stories in height, built of timber frame construction and covered by a hipped roof. It has a two interior chimneys, and follows a conventional period floor plan with parlors on either side of a central stair hall. The front facade is symmetrical, with sash windows arrayed around a center entrance. The entrance is flanked by Doric pilasters and topped by a multilight transom window. Most of the associated farm complex dates to either late 19th or 20th century; there is an early 19th-century barn. The land of the farmstead is divided amongst pasture, farming acreage, and woodlots, in historic land patterns defined by stone walls and lanes.

The town of Norwich was established by New Hampshire Governor Benning Wentworth (as one of a series of New Hampshire Grants made pursuant to that colony's claim to the area) in 1761. This property was first developed by Thomas Murdock, an Irish immigrant, who settled the land in 1767. Murdock's first house was located across the street from the present house, which he also is credited with building, c. 1788. Murdock was a prominent local citizen, serving in town offices and in the state legislature. The surviving barn on the property was built by his son Constant, who acquired the town's first meeting house at auction in 1817 and used its timbers in its construction. Constant Murdock's heirs sold the property out of the family. It continues to be actively farmed in 2020.

== See also ==
- Maple Hill Farm, located just northeast of this farm
- National Register of Historic Places listings in Windsor County, Vermont
