= Pownal, Vermont =

- Town
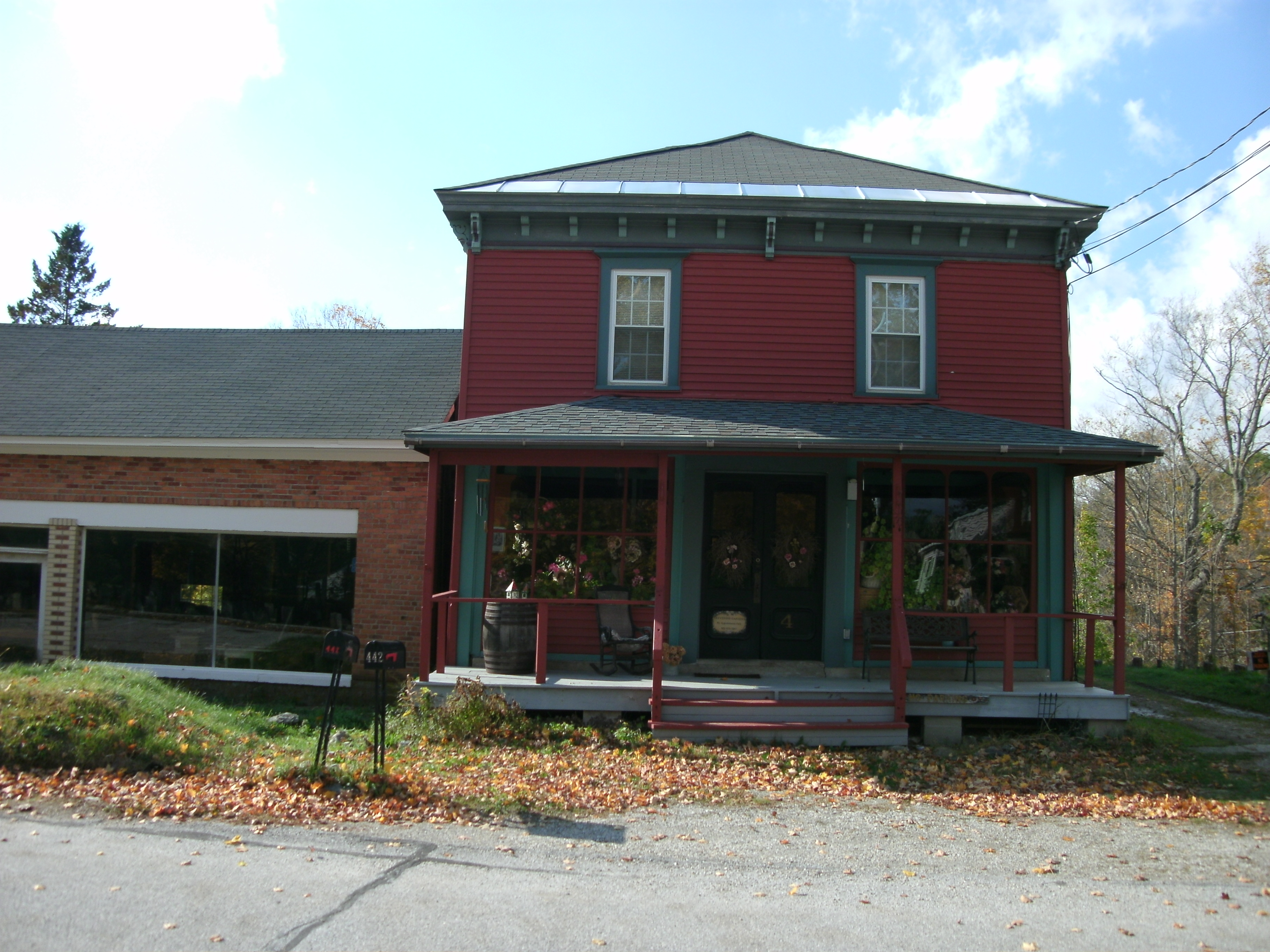
- Former Country Store

- Seal
- Motto: "Gateway to Vermont"
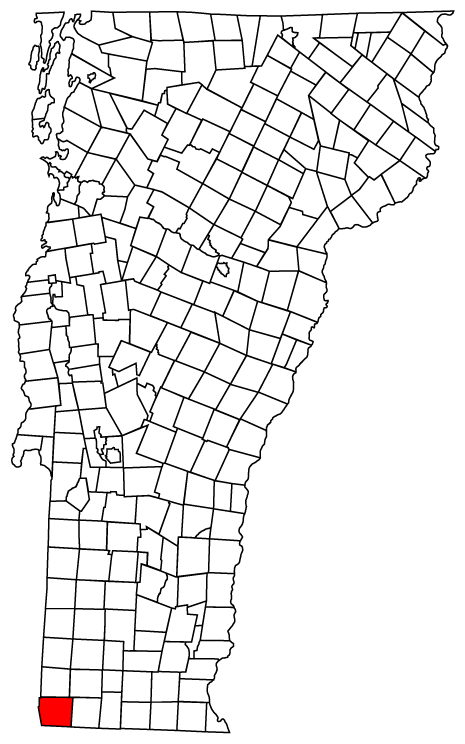
- Pownal, Vermont
- Coordinates: 42°46′30″N 73°14′45″W
- Country: United States
- State: Vermont
- County: Bennington
- Communities: Pownal; North Pownal; Pownal Center

Area
  - Total: 46.7 sq mi (121.0 km^{2})
  - Land: 46.4 sq mi (120.3 km^{2})
  - Water: 0.27 sq mi (0.7 km^{2})
- Elevation: 1,299 ft (396 m)

Population (2020)
  - Total: 3,258
  - Density: 70/sq mi (27.1/km^{2})
- Time zone: UTC-5 (Eastern (EST))
  - Summer (DST): UTC-4 (EDT)
- ZIP codes: 05261 (Pownal); 05260 (North Pownal); 05201 (Bennington)
- Area code: 802
- FIPS code: 50-57025
- GNIS feature ID: 1462179
- Website: www.townofpownal.org

Pownal is a town in Bennington County, Vermont, United States. As of the 2020 census, the town population was 3,258. The town of Pownal includes the villages of Pownal, North Pownal, and Pownal Center.

== History ==
During the Woodland period, the area was settled by the Mahican people, with others, such as the Mohawks, traveling across it. By the late 17th century, Europeans may have entered the area as a result of the establishment of the Dutch patroonship owned by Kiliaen van Rensselaer, the Manor of Rensselaerswyck, which extended west and east out of Albany and the fur trading community of Beverwyck. The southwestern corner of Pownal was part of the patroonship. Rensselaerswyck passed into English control in 1664. The first European settlers may have entered the area in the 1730s. Those settlers may have been Dutch or other Europeans who leased land within Rensselaerwyck. On January 28, 1760, New Hampshire Governor Benning Wentworth chartered Pownal, which he named after his fellow royal governor, Thomas Pownall of the Province of Massachusetts Bay.

Thereafter, settlers, primarily of English descent, began to arrive from Massachusetts, Connecticut and Rhode Island. In 1766, 185 male heads of households in Pownal sent a petition to George III, asking that their land claims be recognized and that the fees required to do so be waived. Since Wentworth had granted to settlers land that the Province of New York also claimed, legal and physical conflicts broke out between "Yorkers" and settlers in the New Hampshire Grants (or "The Grants"). As a result, a number of Pownal residents joined the Green Mountain Boys under Ethan Allen.

By the American Revolution, the town was deeply divided between "Yankees" and the Tories, those sympathetic to England, each of whom considered himself or herself a Loyalist. Tories were often arrested and imprisoned.

These tensions were strong enough that when British General John Burgoyne's Saratoga campaign brought conflict to the area, Vermonters fought on both sides. William Card, originally of Rhode Island, fought for the British at the Battle of Bennington along with four of his sons: Jonathan, Elisha, Philo (or possible Peleg), and Stephen. The battle, a virtually complete American victory, resulted in the capture of the elder Card and all four of his sons, but they were soon released. Three years later, William Card's grandsons Thomas and Jonathan would serve in a Vermont Patriot regiment.

By the end of the Revolution, most Tories had fled Pownal for safety among the United Empire Loyalists who resettled in Canada. The novel Memoir of a Green Mountain Boy starts and ends in Pownal during the early years of the Revolution.

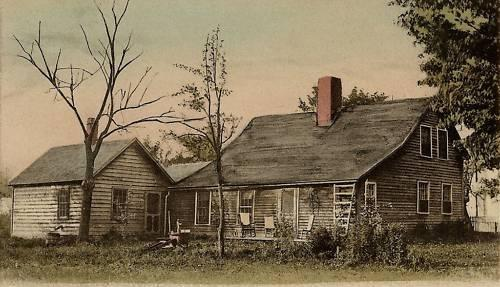
The Mooar-Wright House in 1909, one of the oldest houses in Vermont

The oldest house in both Pownal and Vermont is the Mooar-Wright House, possibly built in the 1750s. Some think it may have been built by John Defoe (or DeVoet), a Tory who was imprisoned in 1776, escaped, fought on the side of the British and Hessian forces at the Battle of Bennington, was captured, escaped again, and settled in Canada. Others believe the Mooar-Wright house was built by Charles Wright in 1765.

Pownal citizens have long prided themselves on their independent spirit. In 1789, a touring minister, the Rev. Nathan Perkins, described the town this way: " ... Pawnal ye first town, poor land – very unpleasant – very uneven – miserable set of inhabitants – no religion, Rhode Island haters of religion – Baptists, quakers, & some Presbyterians – no meeting house."

Today Pownal has five churches. The oldest church, Pownal Center Community Church, was organized in 1794 as the Union Church, serving both Baptists and Methodists, and open to any denomination. The first church was a log structure. It was replaced in 1849 by the present church, jointly owned by the town and church. This church has a unique history as it was deeded to the Town and three members of the church as part of gleebe lands by the King of England.

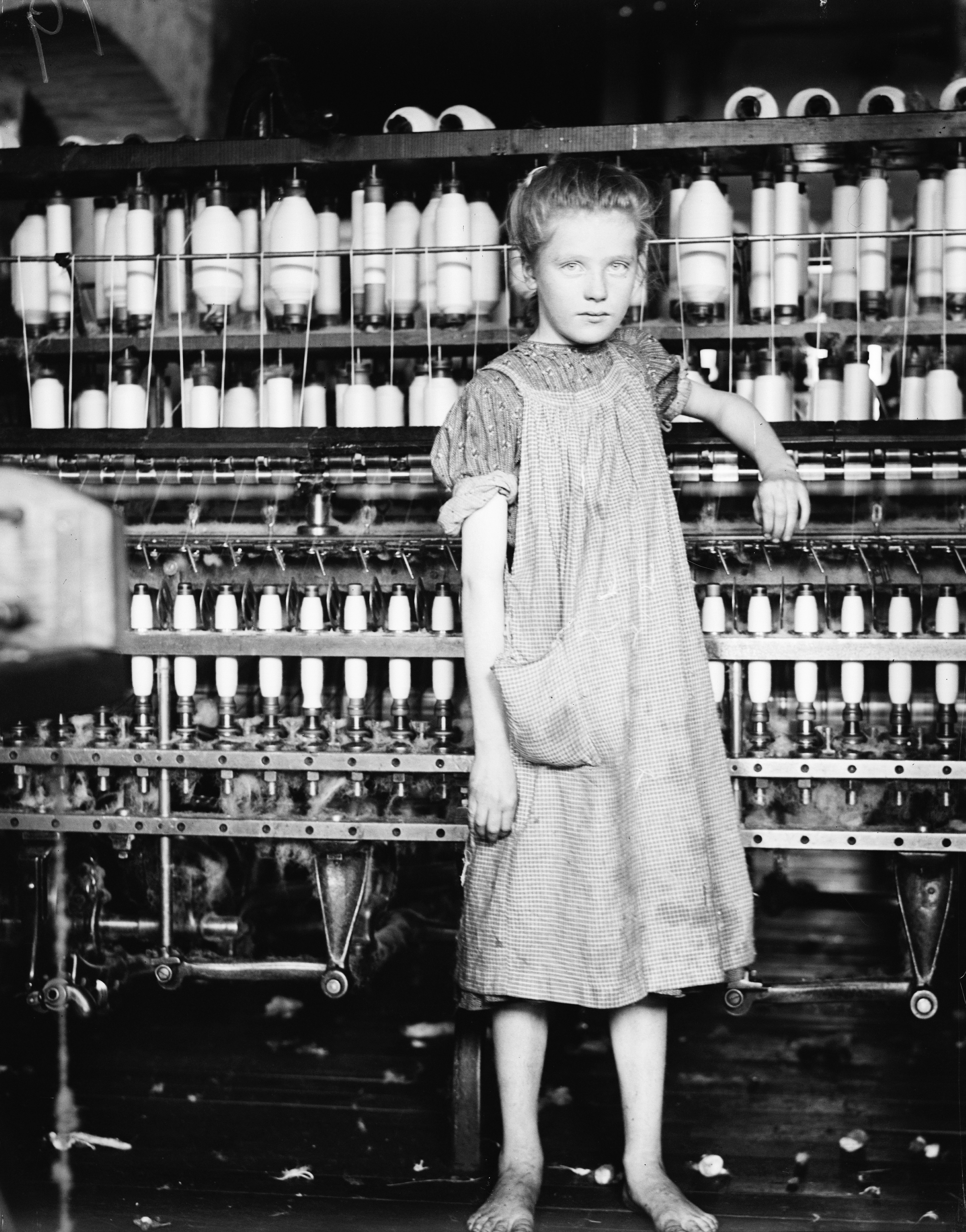
Addie Card, child laborer, from a 1910 photograph by Lewis Hine.

In 1851, Chester Arthur (later to become President of the United States), was appointed principal to an academy for boys. The academy prepared boys for college (and became the foundation for Arthur's future path to study law). Future President James Garfield also taught in North Pownal.

Both cotton mills and woolen mills operated during the 19th century. The wool industry reached its peak between 1820 and 1840, though farmers continued to raise sheep until the 20th century. On the Hoosic River in North Pownal, an 18th-century gristmill was replaced by a woolen mill that operated from 1849 until 1863, when it burned. The Plunkett & Barber Co. Mill, built in 1866, served as a cotton mill until 1930, becoming a tannery in 1937. It closed in 1988. Remediated as a Superfund site, the mill site is planned to become a recreation area.

During the early part of the 20th century, muckraking photographer, Lewis Hine, took a photograph of twelve-year-old Addie Card working in the mills, which Hine labeled as, "Anemic Little Spinner in North Pownal Cotton Mill, North Pownal, Vermont, August 1910". This photograph was featured on a U.S. stamp commemorating the passage of the first child labor laws (see the Keating–Owen Act). Elizabeth Winthrop has written a novel, Counting on Grace, inspired by Card's photograph and life.

The Berkshire Street Railway Company began trolley service from Williamstown to Bennington via Pownal on June 27, 1907. Service was discontinued in 1927. The brick power station still stands along Route 7.

Lime quarries operated in North Pownal until 1936. A rail car line extended from the southernmost quarry to the mill on the west side of Route 346, where the stone was crushed and packaged for shipment.

The Green Mountain Race Track opened in 1963. The track offered both thoroughbred and standardbred horse racing until 1977, and greyhound racing from 1976 to 1992. Since closing as a racetrack, the site has hosted live events occasionally, including a rock concert in the Lollapalooza series in 1996, and antique car shows from 2005 to 2008. As of April 2022, the racetrack appears to be unused and fallen into disrepair.

=== Camp Ilium ===
The YMCA's Camp Ilium was in Pownal. Ilium is notable because on September 10, 1910, S. F. Lester of Troy, New York, became the first person to hold the Scouting leadership position of Scoutmaster (approved by the BSA). He received his certification from the BSA headquarters in New York City. In 1910 he led a group of 30 scouts to the camp. Camp Ilium was the starting point of the Boy Scout Movement for Pownal and Troy, New York.

== Geography ==
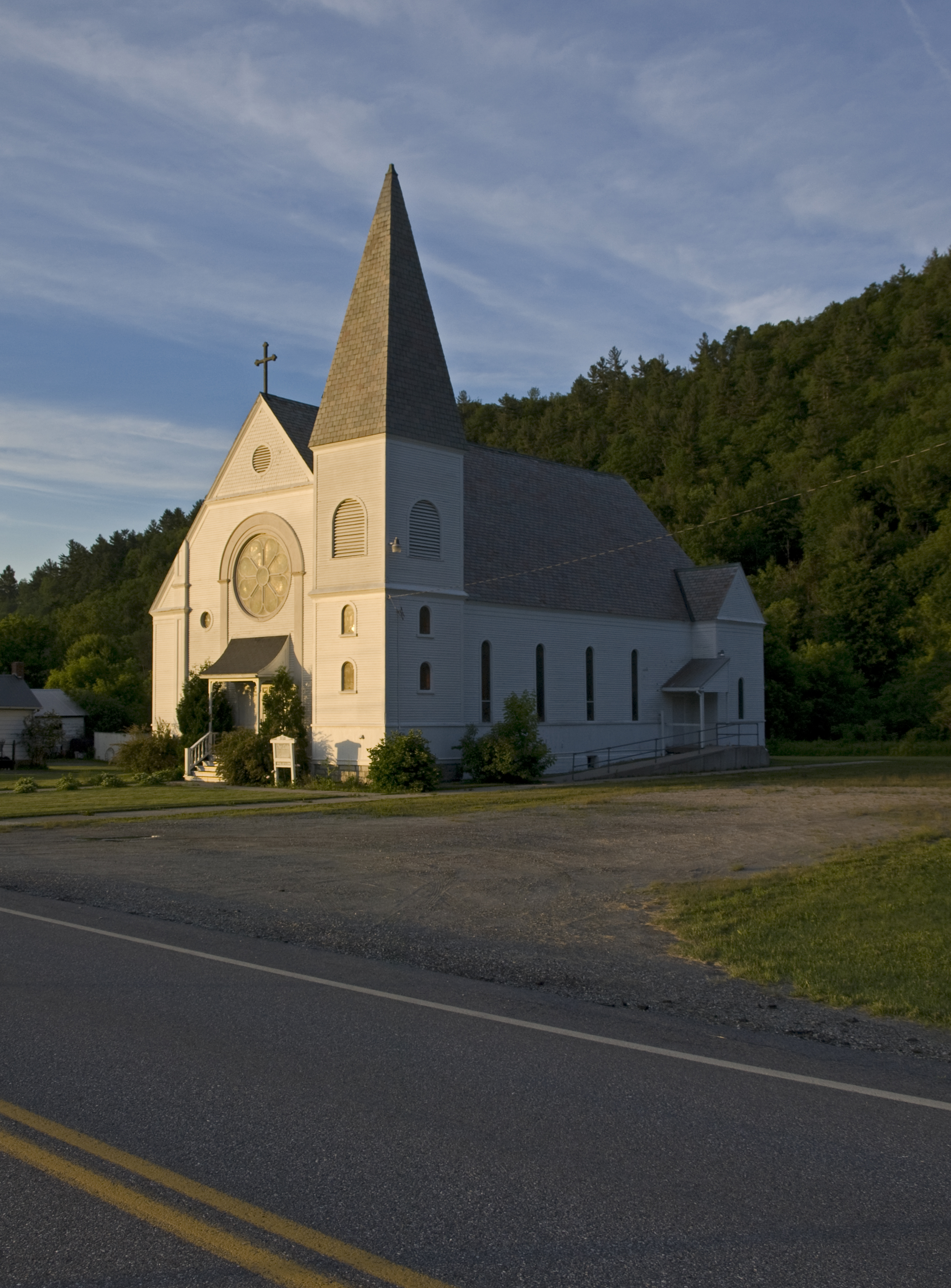
Church of Our Lady of Lourdes, North Pownal

Pownal is the southwesternmost town in Vermont; it is bordered by Williamstown, Massachusetts, to the south and Petersburgh, New York, to the west. Pownal also borders the towns of Stamford to the east, Woodford to the northeast, and Bennington to the north. It is closer to Hartford, Connecticut than it is to Burlington.

According to the United States Census Bureau, the town has a total area of 46.7 square miles (121.0 km^{2}), of which 46.4 square miles (120.3 km^{2}) is land and 0.27 square miles (0.7 km^{2}), or 0.58%, is water. Pownal is drained by the Hoosic River, a tributary of the Hudson River.

The town is crossed by two state-maintained highways: U.S. Route 7, which is the town's main road; and Vermont Route 346, a short route that begins at U.S. 7 at the village of Pownal and runs northwestward (along the Hoosic River) to the New York state line.

The Long Trail, America's oldest long-distance hiking trail, begins in Pownal on the border with Massachusetts within the Green Mountain National Forest. The trail in that location is also part of the Appalachian Trail. It was created by and is managed by the Green Mountain Club.

=== Climate ===
This climatic region is typified by large seasonal temperature differences, with warm to hot (and often humid) summers and cold (sometimes severely cold) winters. According to the Köppen Climate Classification system, Pownal has a humid continental climate, abbreviated "Dfb" on climate maps.

Historical population
Census	Pop.	Note	%±
1790	1,746		—
1800	1,692		−3.1%
1810	1,655		−2.2%
1820	1,812		9.5%
1830	1,835		1.3%
1840	1,613		−12.1%
1850	1,742		8.0%
1860	1,731		−0.6%
1870	1,705		−1.5%
1880	2,019		18.4%
1890	1,919		−5.0%
1900	1,976		3.0%
1910	1,599		−19.1%
1920	1,396		−12.7%
1930	1,425		2.1%
1940	1,402		−1.6%
1950	1,453		3.6%
1960	1,509		3.9%
1970	2,441		61.8%
1980	3,269		33.9%
1990	3,485		6.6%
2000	3,560		2.2%
2010	3,527		−0.9%
2020	3,258		−7.6%
U.S. Decennial Census

== Demographics ==
As of the census of 2000, there were 3,560 people, 1,373 households, and 1,010 families residing in the town. The population density was 76.3 people per square mile (29.5 people/km^{2}). There were 1,563 housing units at an average density of 33.5 units per square mile (12.9 units/km^{2}). The racial makeup of the town was 97.84% White, 0.28% African American, 0.42% Native American, 0.56% Asian, 0.20% from other races, and 0.70% from two or more races. Hispanic or Latino of any race were 0.42% of the population.

There were 1,373 households, out of which 34.0% had children under the age of 18 living with them, 58.0% were married couples living together, 11.4% had a female householder with no husband present, and 26.4% were non-families. 19.7% of all households were made up of individuals, and 6.3% had someone living alone who was 65 years of age or older. The average household size was 2.59 and the average family size was 2.95.

In the town, the age distribution of the population shows 25.4% under the age of 18, 7.6% from 18 to 24, 28.9% from 25 to 44, 27.0% from 45 to 64, and 11.1% who were 65 years of age or older. The median age was 38 years. For every 100 females, there were 103.2 males. For every 100 females age 18 and over, there were 96.0 males.

The median income for a household in the town was $39,149, and the median income for a family was $41,006. Males had a median income of $30,753 versus $24,212 for females. The per capita income for the town was $17,669. About 8.5% of families and 9.6% of the population were below the poverty line, including 16.9% of those under age 18 and 1.8% of those age 65 or over.

== Notable people ==
- Chester A. Arthur, 21st president of the United States, taught penmanship in Pownal school.
- Samuel S. Ellsworth, U.S. Congressman from New York
- James Fisk, businessman of the mid- to late-1800s
- Abraham B. Gardner, Lieutenant Governor of Vermont
- James A. Garfield, 20th president of the United States, taught penmanship in Pownal school.
- Barbara Howes, poet
- Margaret Krieger, tried as a witch in 1785
- Amby McConnell, Major League Baseball player
