= Pownal (CDP), Vermont =

Census-designated place in Vermont, United States

Pownal, Vermont
- Census-designated place
- Location within Vermont Location within the United States
- Coordinates: 42°45′55″N 73°14′08″W
- Country: United States
- State: Vermont
- County: Bennington
- Town: Pownal

Area
  - Total: 0.52 sq mi (1.34 km^{2})
  - Land: 0.51 sq mi (1.33 km^{2})
  - Water: 0.0077 sq mi (0.02 km^{2})
- Elevation: 597 ft (182 m)
- Time zone: UTC-5 (Eastern (EST))
  - Summer (DST): UTC-4 (EDT)
- ZIP Code: 05261
- Area code: 802
- FIPS code: 50-56950
- GNIS feature ID: 2807124

Pownal is an unincorporated community and census-designated place (CDP) in the town of Pownal, Bennington County, Vermont, United States. It was first listed as a CDP prior to the 2020 census.

It is located in southwestern Bennington County, in the southwestern part of the town of Pownal, 1.5 miles (2.4 km) north of the Vermont–Massachusetts border. The Hoosic River, a westward-flowing tributary of the Hudson River, forms the western edge of the village. Vermont Route 346 passes through the center of the village, leading northwest 3 miles (5 km) to North Pownal. It has its southern terminus in the eastern part of Pownal village, at U.S. Route 7, which leads north 9 miles (14 km) to Bennington and south 5 miles (8 km) to Williamstown.
