= Margaret Krieger =

American accused of witchcraft (c. 1724 – 1790)

- Born: Margarette Schumaker; 1723 or 1724; Williamstown, Massachusetts, U.S.
- Died: February 2, 1790 (aged 66); Williamstown, Massachusetts, U.S.
- Occupation: Mill owner

Margaret Krieger (1723 or 1724 – February 2, 1790) also known as Widow Krieger, was the only recorded person to undergo a witch trial in Vermont. At the time, she was a widowed mill owner from Pownal. After surviving the alleged trial, Krieger moved back to Williamstown, Massachusetts, her birthplace.

== Early life and career ==
Margarette Schumaker was born about 1724 in Williamstown, Massachusetts. She may have been descended from Dutch immigrants who began settling along the Hoosic River in the 1600s. She married Johann Juri Krieger (born c. 1708) in 1741 at the First Reformed Church in Albany, New York.

The Kriegers built a mill in Pownal, Vermont, and developed land along the Hoosic River. They were labeled squatters in the records of English colonists in the 1760s, but the English granted them ownership rights to the land. The Kriegers had three sons, who moved back to Williamstown and started another mill there.

In 1785, Johann died, and Margarette became known as Widow Krieger. She ran her sawmill alone after Johann's death.

== Witch trial ==
In 1785, Krieger allegedly survived Vermont's only known witch trial.

After Krieger's husband died, her neighbors began to accuse her of being an extraordinary woman who possessed extraordinary powers. She was called before Pownal's town safety committee on charges of witchcraft. The committee heard testimony from her neighbors and decided to put her on a trial by ordeal. They let her choose from climbing a tree before it was chopped down or trying her by water, and if she survived either ordeal she would be deemed a witch and executed. The committee cut a hole through the ice on the Hoosic River and pushed Krieger in, and she sank to the bottom of the river. Seeing this as sign of innocence, they pulled her out of the water, and Krieger survived the trial.

=== Analysis ===
The oldest recorded source describing Krieger's alleged witch trial is from 1867, around 80 years after the described events. It is within historian T.E. Brownell's description of early Pownal history in the compilation The Vermont Historical Gazetteer. Krieger's life beyond the trial is documented in town historical records.

Joyce Held of the Pownal Historical Society and Jamie Franklin of the Bennington Museum argue that Krieger was targeted by her neighbors as an excuse to claim her sawmill. Held also attributed the accusations of "extraordinary" behavior to fear and jealousy over Krieger's ability to run a mill as a single woman without a husband. Local legend also explains the accusations as a response to Krieger's unusual economic success after becoming widowed. Jeff Belanger, who produced the "Witchcraft" episode of New England Legends with Tony Dunne, believed that the rise in witch trials in New England around this time was due to settlers' escalating hysteria and religious condemnation during their wars with Native Americans.

== Later life ==
Krieger returned to Williamstown after the trial and lived with her sons. She died in 1790 and was buried in Williamstown.

== Legacy ==
In Pownal, Krieger lived below a cliffside rock formation that is now locally known as Krieger Rocks, or Witches Rocks. Allegedly, the witch trial took place below the rocks as well. Krieger's survival of her trial has been a longstanding local legend around Pownal.

Krieger is mentioned in the 2017 New England Legends episode, "Witchcraft", and featured in the 2023 episode, "Ghosts and Witches".

In 2021, residents of Pownal began an annual Witches Walk in Krieger's honor. It crosses the North Pownal Bridge over the Hoosic River.

On September 16, 2023, Pownal dedicated a historical marker to Krieger. It is placed below Krieger Rocks along the Hoosic River.
