= Juniper Island (Lake Champlain) =

Island in the United States of America

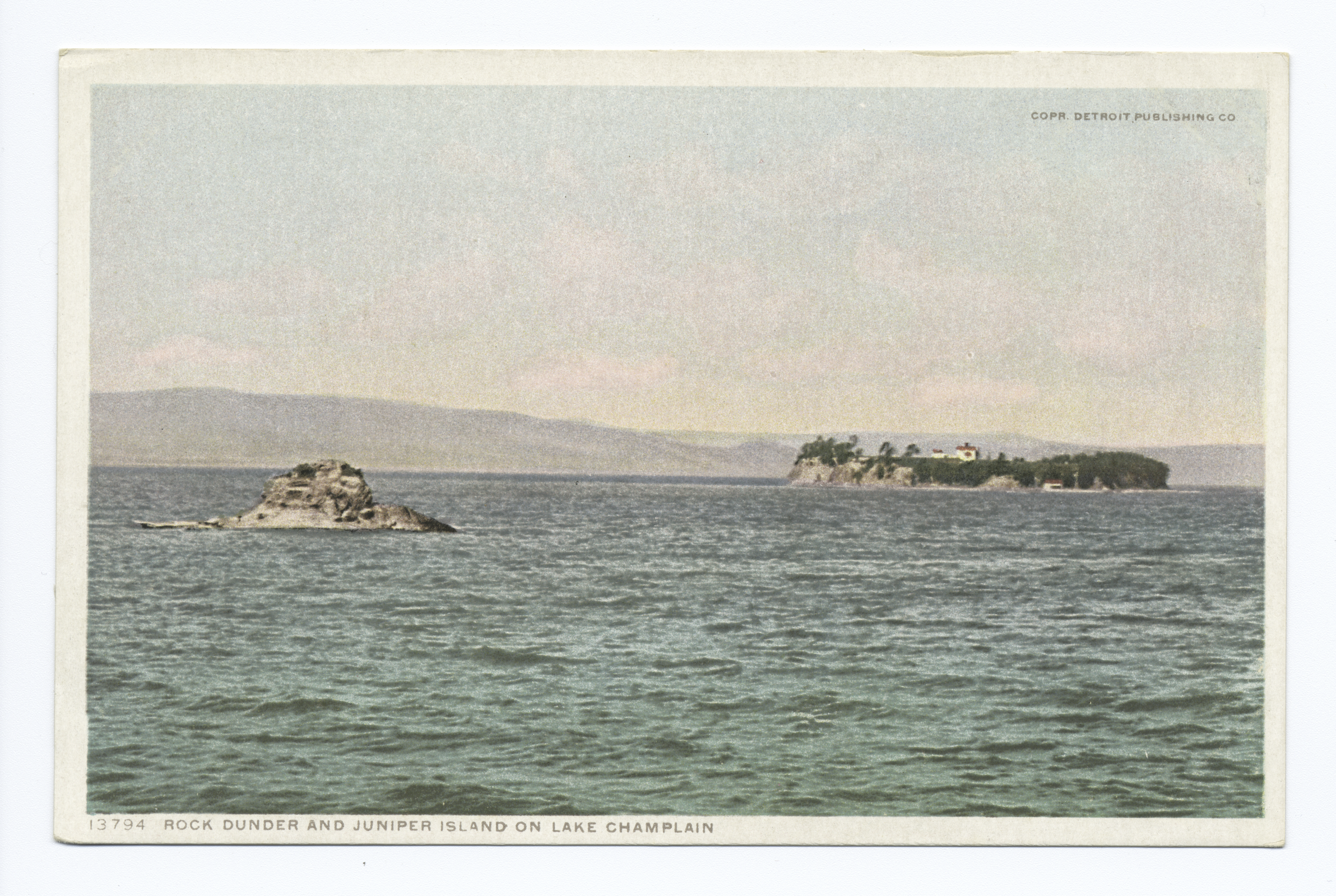
- Rock Dunder (left) and Juniper Island, from a late 19th-century postcard
- Interactive map of Juniper Island (Lake Champlain)

Geography
- Location: Lake Champlain
- Coordinates: 44°27′00″N 73°16′36″W
- Area: 13 acres (5.3 ha)

Administration
- United States
- State: Vermont
- County: Chittenden
- City: Unincorporated Gore

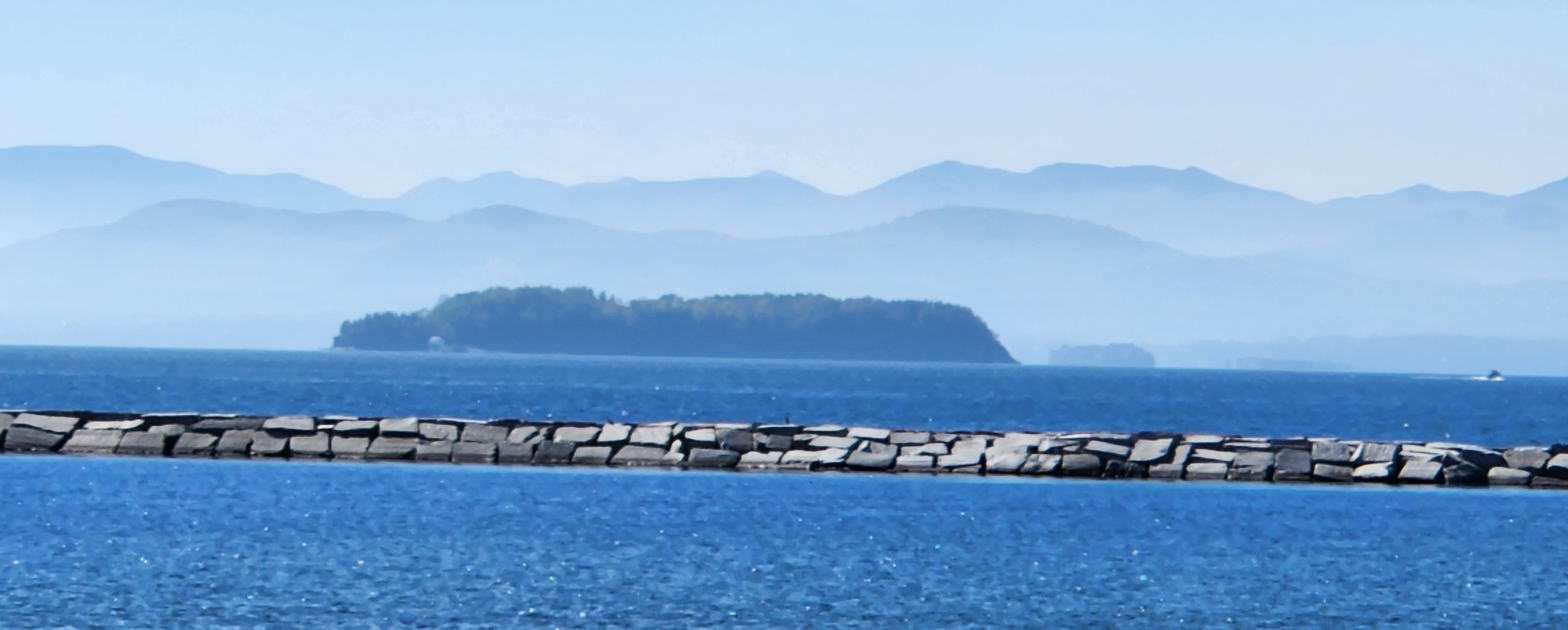
Juniper Island in 2022, as seen from Burlington, VT

Juniper Island is a 13-acre (53,000 m^{2}) island in Lake Champlain, approximately 3.15-mile (5.07 km) southwest of Burlington, Vermont's King Street Ferry Dock. The island is home to the Juniper Island Lighthouse, and is prominently visible in Lake Champlain from anywhere along the Burlington waterfront. The State of Vermont purchased the island for $200 in 1825 and ceded it to the federal government. A 30-foot (9.1 m) brick tower and keeper's house were constructed. Up to that point, lanterns hung on trees by landowners up and down the lake had served navigation; this would be the first true lighthouse on the lake.

Apparently, due to poor workmanship, materials, or both, the original lighthouse had to be replaced less than twenty years later. That second lighthouse (a 25-foot (7.6 m) tower consisting of four cast iron rings) is still there, though retired, and is the oldest cast-iron lighthouse remaining in the US.

A 60-foot (18 m) skeleton tower light took over in 1954. Two years later, Juniper Island was sold at auction to state senator Fred Fayette. The keeper's house was severely damaged by fire in 1962 and not repaired, though the tower and a separate shed for a fog bell were undamaged.

Fayette's family inherited the property, and in 2001 they constructed a new dwelling using nearly 18,000 bricks salvaged from the ruins of the original house. Two years later a new, taller tower replaced that of 1954. The family plans to restore the old tower, but it is unlikely to be relit (as has been done with other lights on the lake) since trees on the island obscure it from the water.
