= Mooar-Wright House =

Historic house in Vermont, US

Coordinates: 42.766757°N 73.240798°W

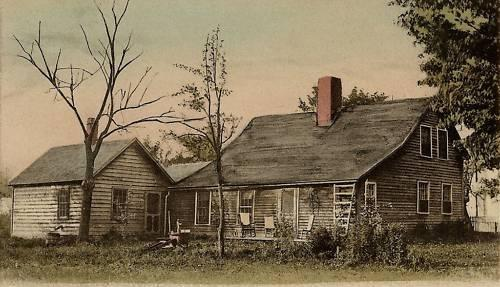
- Alternative names: Defoe-Mooar-Wright House

General information
- Type: House
- Town or city: Pownal, Vermont
- Country: United States
- Completed: c. 1750 or 1764

Mooar-Wright House (also known as the Defoe-Mooar-Wright House) is a historic house in Pownal, Vermont that is one of the oldest in Vermont. The house was built in c. 1750 or 1764.) and is possibly the oldest house in Vermont. Some believe that the house was built by the Dutch, and others believe that it was built by John Defoe, a British loyalist imprisoned there. The construction date has not yet been verified with dendrochronology.
