= Hyde Log Cabin =

Historic house in Vermont, United States

- U.S. National Register of Historic Places
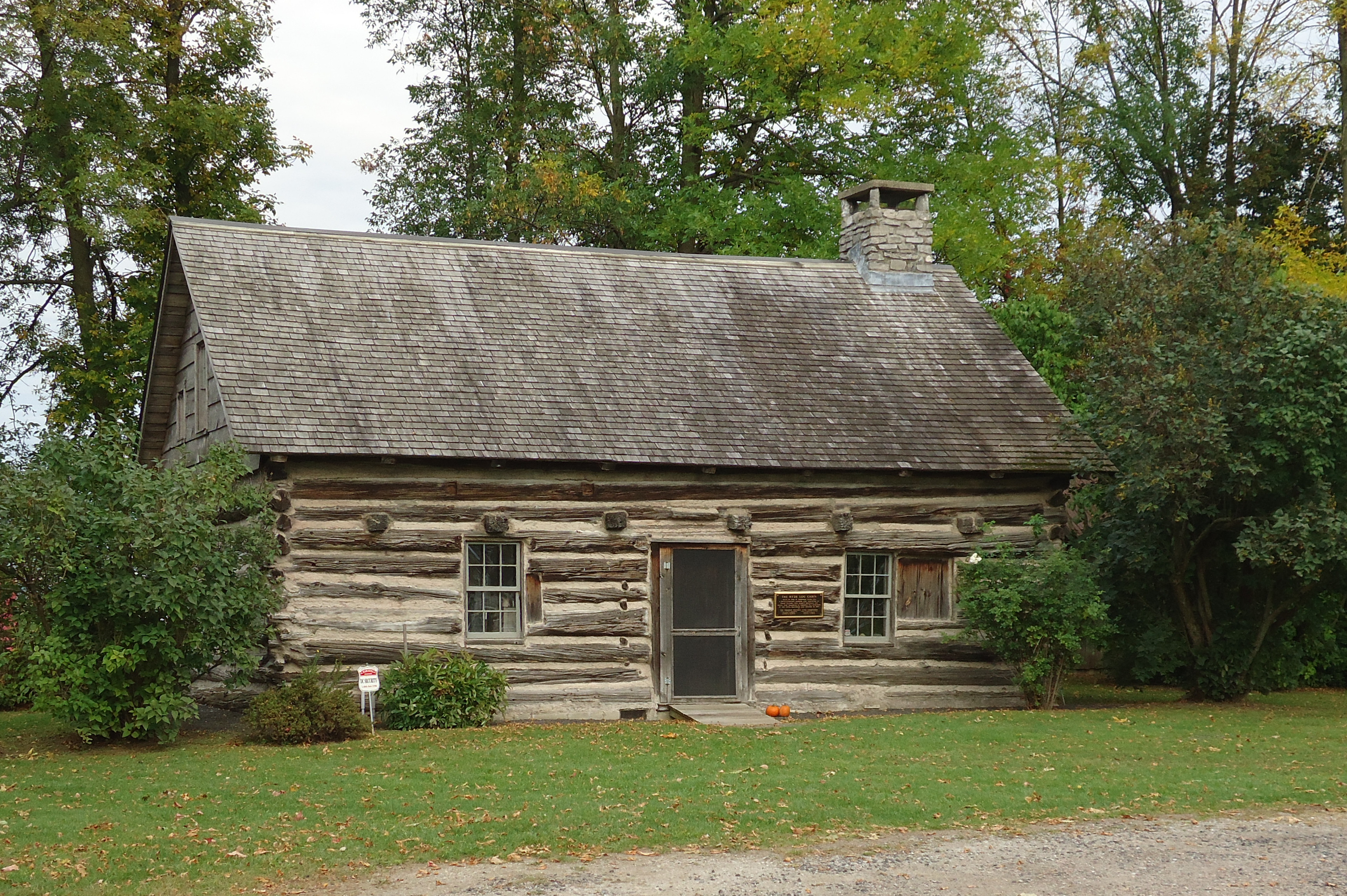

- Location within Vermont Location within the United States
- Location: U.S. 2, Grand Isle, Vermont
- Coordinates: 44°43′34″N 73°17′32″W
- Area: 1 acre (0.40 ha)
- Built: 1783
- Architectural style: Log Cabin
- NRHP reference No.: 71000057
- Added to NRHP: March 11, 1971

The Hyde Log Cabin is a historic log cabin on U.S. Route 2 in Grand Isle, Vermont, United States. It was built in 1783, and occupied by the Hyde family for 150 years. Believed to be one of the oldest log cabins in the US, it was added to the National Register of Historic Places in 1971.

== Description and history ==
The Hyde Log Cabin stands on the east side of US Route 2 north of Grand Isle center and just north of the Grand Isle Elementary School, sharing a lot with a small wood-frame 1814 schoolhouse. The cabin is a modest single-story structure, fashioned out of peeled cedar logs measuring between 14 and 18 inches in diameter. The building footprint is 20 by 25 feet (6.1 m × 7.6 m), and it is covered with a gabled roof. The interior consists of a single chamber with a loft space above. Its massive stone chimney is a 20th-century reconstruction of the original, the building having been moved about 2 miles (3.2 km) from its original location.

The cabin was built in 1783 by Jedediah Hyde Jr., who surveyed the Grand Isle Area for Ira and Ethan Allen, who had acquired large tracts of land in the region. Hyde raised ten children in this cabin, and it was subsequently owned and occupied by members of the Hyde family for 150 years. In 1946 it was moved to its present location, and has undergone several rounds of restoration. It is owned by the state and operated as a historic house museum by the Grand Isle Historical Society, open on weekends between May and October.

== See also ==
- National Register of Historic Places listings in Grand Isle County, Vermont
- List of the oldest buildings in Vermont
