= Long Trail School =

Coordinates: 43.27025°N 73.09824°W

Location
- 1045 Kirby Hollow Road Dorset; Dorset, Vermont 05251; United States

Information
- Type: Private, International Baccalaureate
- Established: 1975
- Founders: David Wilson
- Head of school: Colin Igoe
- Staff: 11
- Teaching staff: 32
- Grades: 6-12
- Enrollment: 223
- Colors: Red, white, black
- Athletics: Softball, Baseball, Soccer, Rock Climbing, Basketball, Golf, Skiing, Cross-Country, Track and Field Ultimate Frisbee
- Mascot: Mountain Lion
- Nickname: LTS
- Accreditation: Vermont State Board of Education, NEASC
- Newspaper: Trailmix
- Yearbook: The Trail
- Website: http://www.longtrailschool.org

Long Trail School is an independent college-preparatory coeducational day school serving students in grades 6-12 located in Dorset, Vermont, United States. The school provides financial aid to qualified students. Many area students are eligible for some amount of tax-funded tuition assistance.

== History ==
David Wilson founded Long Trail School in 1975 with an original class of 14 students in the rented space of the Dorset Sportsman’s Club.

The school, which serves grades 6-12, has consistently grown; 200 students were enrolled for the 2019-20 academic year.

Notable changes over the years have included the acquisition and construction the 60,000 sq ft (5,600 m^{2}) facility with winding hallways and small classrooms, two common rooms, offices, a library, a 220-seat theater, art studios, presentation spaces, and a gymnasium. In 2019 a new building was opened entitled "The Field House". It is an athletics center.

== About the school ==
Long Trail School has drawn students from over 38 towns in Vermont and neighboring New York state, and from 20 foreign countries.

As of May 14, 2010, Long Trail School is the first school in Vermont to be officially inducted as an International Baccalaureate school.

=== Academics ===
Class sizes currently average 8-12 students, though classes with only a single student are not unheard of at Long Trail. Academic standards are high by comparison to other local schools, with test scores consistently above state and local averages. Even after offering IB courses, Long Trail continues to offer some Advanced Placement classes, many independent study opportunities and student-demanded classes.

=== The arts ===
Long Trail offers musical, visual, and theatrical arts.

=== Athletics ===
Long Trail offers athletic teams for middle and upper school students in soccer, cross-country, golf, basketball, dance rock climbing, track and field and ultimate frisbee.

In 2004, Long Trail made the transition to Division IV varsity athletics.

== LTSummer ==
LTSummer is a day camp held by Long Trail School every summer. The camp is divided into several programs for different age groups.
