= Petersburgh United Methodist Church =

Historic church in New York, United States

- U.S. National Register of Historic Places
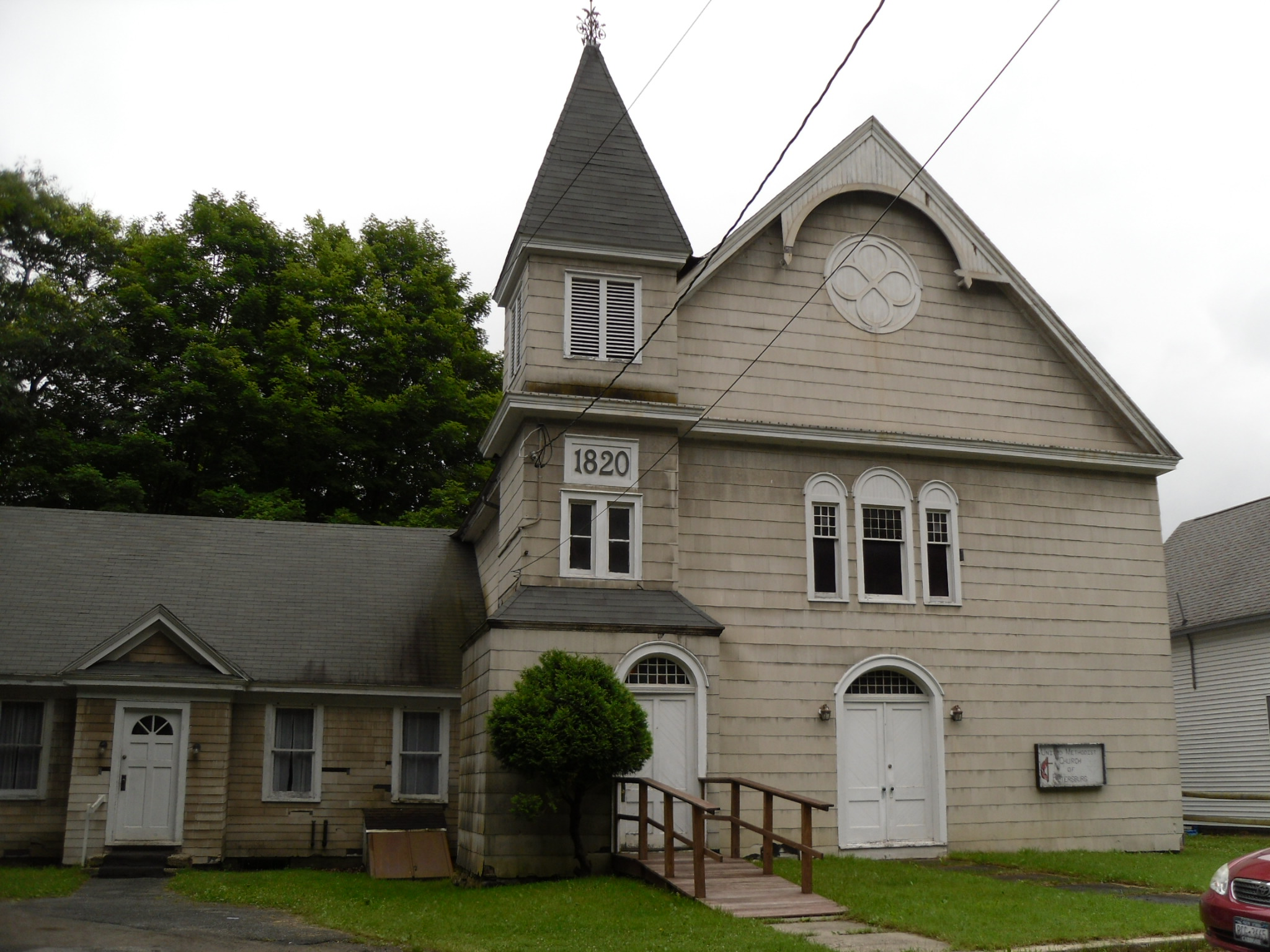
- Petersburgh United Methodist Church, June 2010

- Location within New York Location within the United States
- Location: 12 Head of Lane Rd., Petersburgh, New York
- Coordinates: 42°45′8″N 73°20′44″W
- Area: less than one acre
- Built: 1820
- Architectural style: Queen Anne
- NRHP reference No.: 03001354
- Added to NRHP: January 2, 2004

Petersburgh United Methodist Church is a historic Methodist church at 12 Head of Lane Road in Petersburgh, Rensselaer County, New York. It was originally built in 1820 and modified to its present Queen Anne style appearance in 1892. The original meeting house style building measures 48 feet long and 36 feet wide. In 1892, the 45 feet tall bell tower was added and a more steeply pitched roof was added over the original roof. An annex was completed in 1938.

It was listed on the National Register of Historic Places in 2004.
