= Lydia Baxter =

American poet

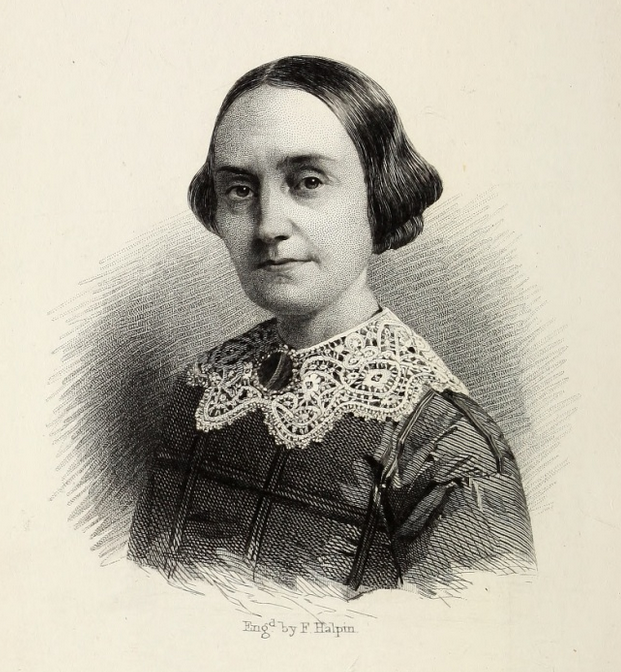
- Born: Lydia Odell; September 2, 1809; Petersburgh, New York
- Died: January 23, 1874 (aged 64); New York City
- Occupations: poet, hymnwriter
- Spouse: John C. Baxter
- Writing career
- Notable work: "The Gate Ajar for Me"

Signature
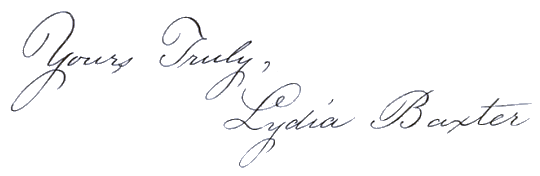

Lydia Baxter (née, Odell; September 2, 1809 – January 23, 1874) was an American poet and hymnwriter. She is chiefly remembered as the author of "The Gate Ajar for Me" and other Sunday school hymns, which became widely known and very popular. This song in particular, and some events associated with it, influenced Ira D. Sankey, American gospel singer and composer, to write his first hymn.

== Early life and education ==
Lydia Odell was born at Petersburgh, New York, September 2, 1809. She had at least one sibling, a sister, Mary. She was educated in the district school of Petersburgh.

== Career ==
She became a Christian while very young, studying under the Rev. Eber Tucker, a Baptist home missionary. She soon spread her influence in her native town, by the fact that her conversion, in connection with that of her younger sister, led to the organization of a Baptist church in that place. There, she became a successful Sunday school teacher.

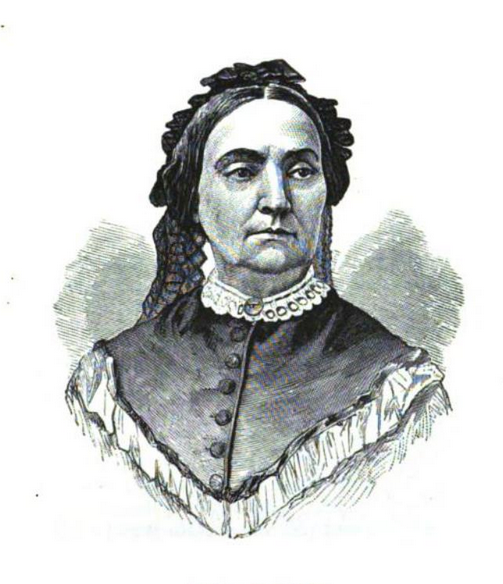
Lydia Baxter

After her marriage to Col. John C. Baxter (1807-1877), the rest of her life was spent in New York City. Principally through her influence, her husband became a Christian a few years after their marriage. Her affiliation was with the Baptist Church.

For many years, Baxter contributed one or more hymns to the anniversary collections of the New York and Baptist Sunday school Unions, in May, which were generally sung in the various churches. Most of the published collections of Sunday school hymns of the day contained liberal selections written by Baxter. Many of her hymns had a worldwide circulation. One, entitled "The Gates Ajar", after becoming popular in the United States and England, was sung throughout Scotland, too. In 1855, she published a book of poems, principally of a religious character, entitled Gems by the Wayside (New York, Sheldon, Lamport & Blakeman, 1855).

== Personal life ==
For nearly thirty years, Baxter's disability kept her bed-ridden much of the time, often the victim of excruciating pain. She died in New York City, January 23, 1874.

== "The Gate Ajar for Me" ==
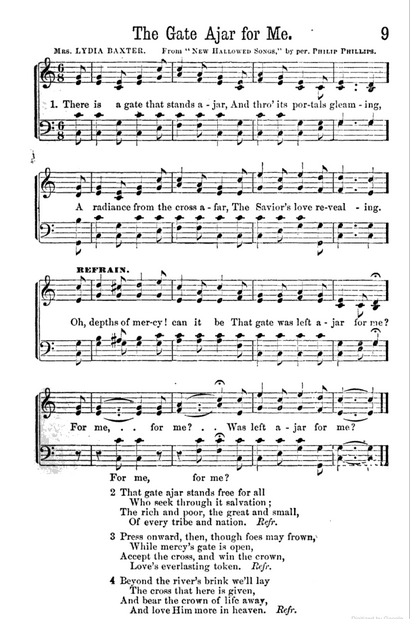
"The Gate Ajar for Me"

Baxter wrote the lyrics for "The Gate Ajar for Me" about three years before her death in New York City in 1874. It was set to music by S. J. Vai.

"There is a gate that stands ajar,
And through its portals gleaming."

This hymn was often used in religious meetings in Great Britain, 1873–74. It was sung at the watch-night service in 1873, the night before New Year's, in the Free Assembly Hall of Edinburgh. A young woman who was present —Maggie Lindsay, of Aberdeen, Scotland— was much impressed by the hymn, and those seated by her side heard her exclaim, "O, heavenly Father, is it true that the gate is standing ajar for me? If it is so, I will go in." That night, she became a Christian disciple. The next day, she called on her pastor, the Rev. J. H. Wilson, minister of the Barclay Church, and told him of her decision. He was greatly pleased, and advised her to tell her school mates of her experience. This she did, and succeeded in converting several of them. Scarcely a month later, on January 28, 1874, Maggie took a train bound for her home, but she never reached it. The train in which she was riding collided with mineral wagon at Manuel Junction. A number of passengers were killed, and Maggie was found in the wreckage. In one of her hands was a copy of Ira D. Sankey's Sacred Songs and Solos, opened at Maggie's favorite hymn, "There is a gate that stands ajar", the page of which was stained with her blood. She was carried into a cottage near the station, where she lingered a few days before her death, frequently heard singing on the couch the chorus of the hymn so dear to her, "For me, for me! was left ajar for me!". In commemoration of this event, which touched Sankey so deeply, he wrote his first hymn, "Home at last", which he also set to music.

== Selected works ==
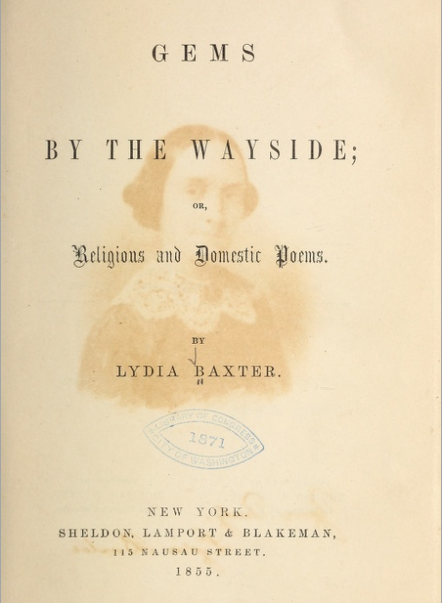
Gems By the Wayside, 1855

Her best known hymns are:

- One by one we cross the river, 1866
- Take the name of Jesus with you, 1870
- The Master is coming, 1870
- There is a gate that stands ajar, 1872
- In the fadeless spring-time, 1872
- Cast thy net again, my brother, 1873
- Go, work in my vineyard, 1873
- I'm weary, I'm fainting, my day's work is done, 1873
- I'm kneeling, Lord, at mercy's gate, 1879
