= Hudson–Hoosic Watershed =

Coordinates: 42.91°N 73.37°W

The Hudson–Hoosic Watershed is a drainage basin in the Northeastern United States. It is located in the Vermont At Large Congressional District, Massachusetts 1st Congressional District, and New York 20th and 21st Congressional Districts.
