= Juniper Island Light =

Lighthouse in Vermont, US

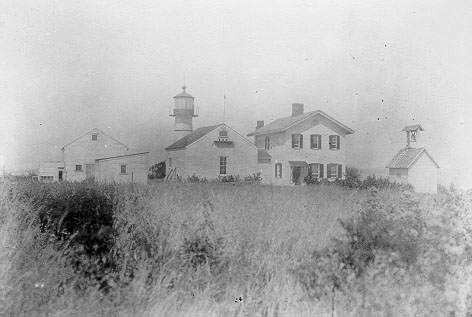
- The station in 1916 (USCG)
- Location: on Juniper Island on Lake Champlain, west of Burlington, Vermont
- Coordinates: 44.4500°N 73.2763°W

Tower
- Constructed: 1826 (first tower); 1846 (current tower)
- Construction: cast iron
- Height: 25 feet (7.6 m)
- Shape: cylindrical

Light
- Deactivated: 1954
- Lens: fourth order Fresnel lens

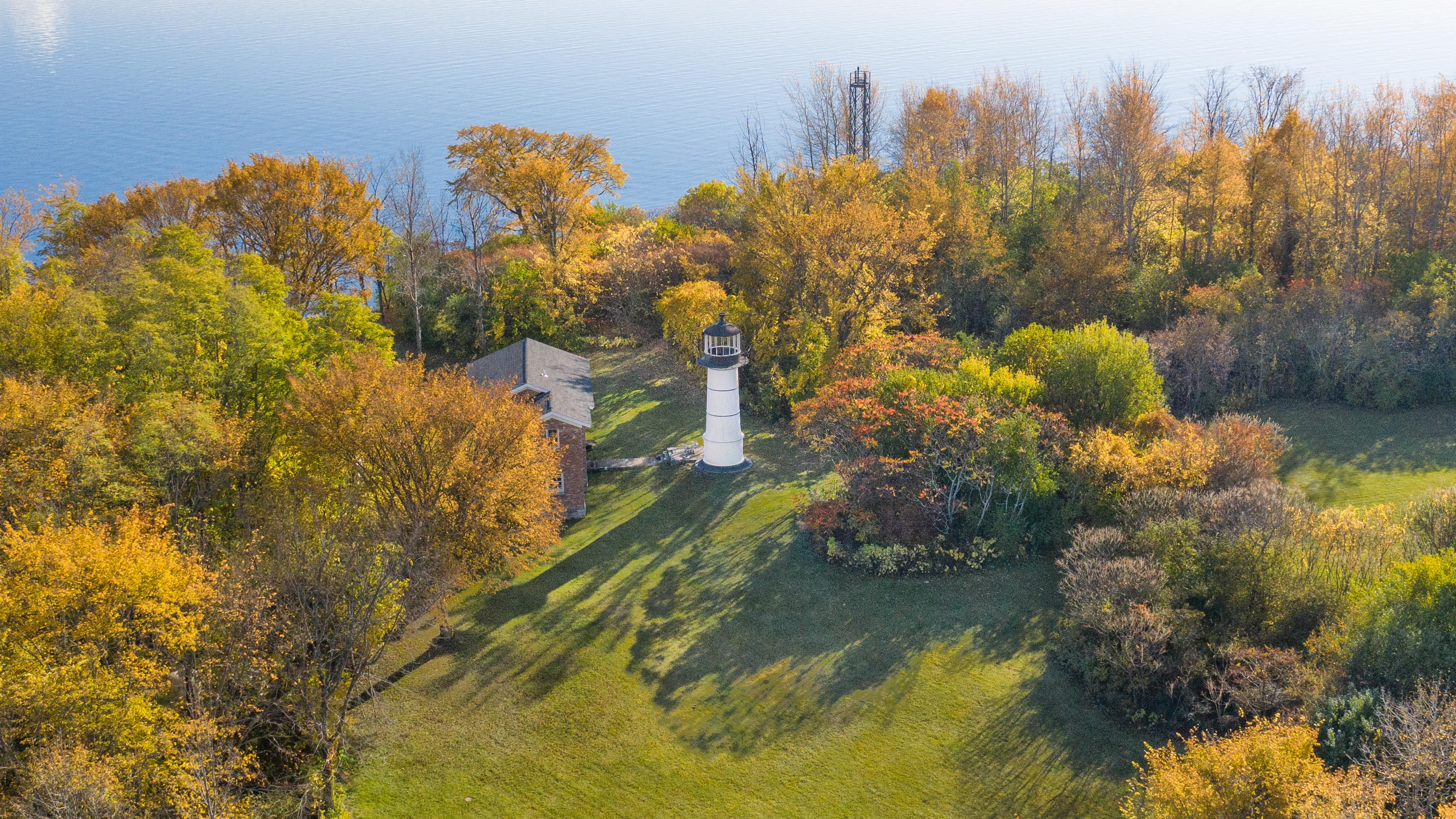
An aerial photo of Juniper Island Lighthouse during the fall season.

The Juniper Island Light on Juniper Island in Vermont is the oldest light station on Lake Champlain and the oldest surviving cast iron lighthouse in the United States.

== History ==
A light station was established on the island in 1826, displacing a private beacon consisting of a lantern on a post. The tower constructed was of brick, 30 feet tall, and lit with the lamp and reflector system typical of the period. The light was intended to indicate to ships the proximity of Burlington's harbor. This tower was reported to be in disrepair by 1838.

A new tower, also 30-foot (9.1 m) tall, was constructed in 1846. This tower was constructed of four rings of cast iron, attached to a brick keeper's house through a passageway. This tower originally retained the old light's beacon, but was upgraded with a fourth-order Fresnel lens in 1853. Early in the next century, the island was used as a storage depot for fuel, buoys, and other items.

The light was deactivated in 1954 in favor of a steel tower placed closer to the water, and the island as a whole was sold at auction to state senator Fred Fayette. Unfortunately the keeper's house was severely damaged by fire in 1962, though the tower and a separate shed for a fog bell were undamaged. Fayette's family inherited the property, and in 2001 they reconstructed the house using bricks from the remains of its predecessor. Two years later a new, taller tower replaced that of 1954. The family plans to restore the old tower, but it is unlikely to be relit (as has been done with other lights on the lake) since trees on the island obscure it from the water.
