= Ye Olde Tavern, Vermont =

Restaurant in Manchester Center, Vermont, United States

Coordinates: 43.1782°N 73.0513°W

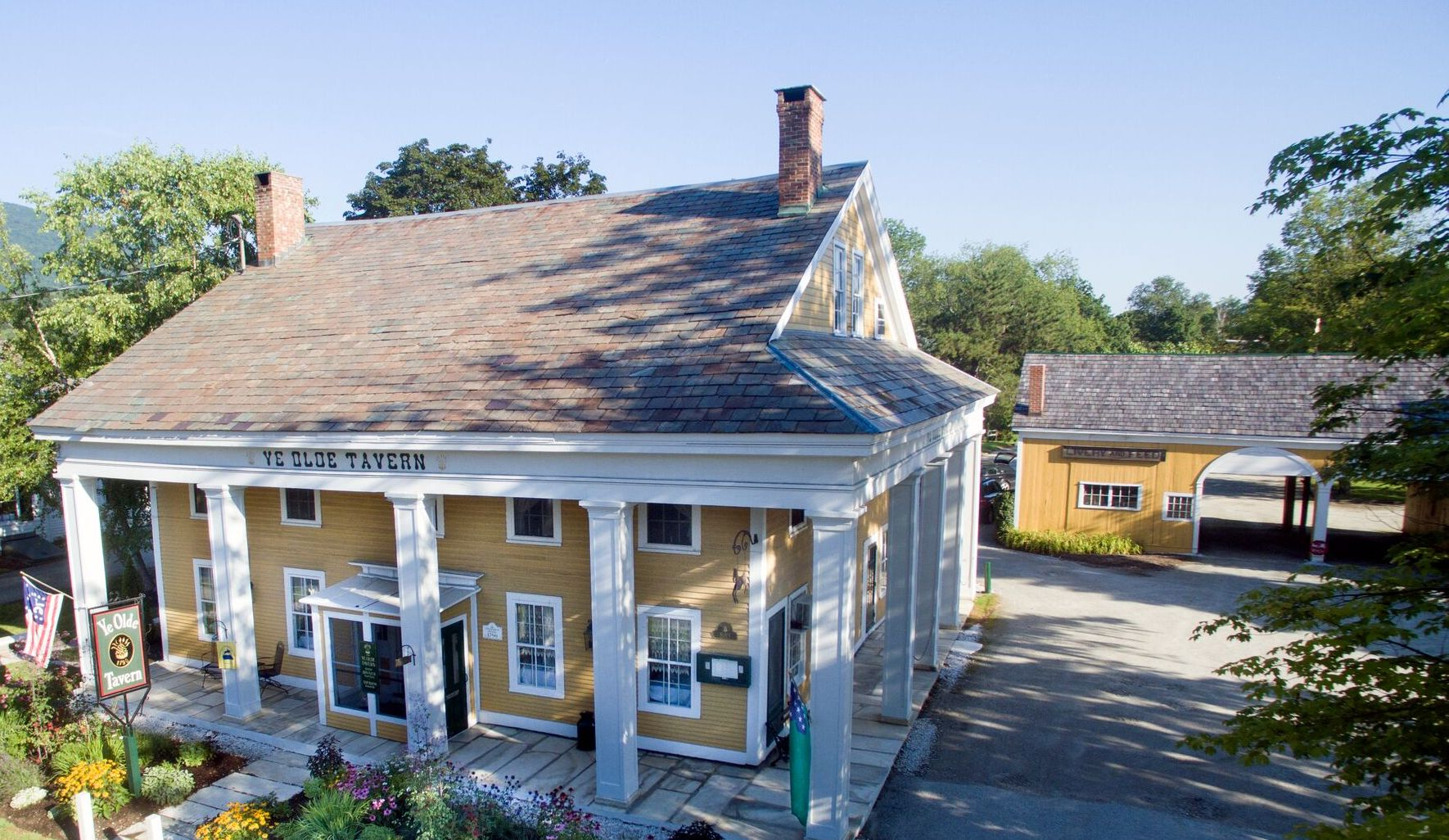
Historic Ye Olde Tavern

Ye Olde Tavern is a restaurant in Manchester Center, Vermont, US, that is listed on the Vermont Register of Historic Places. It was built by Aaron Sheldon from Dorset, Vermont, in 1790, making it the oldest inn in the state of Vermont. It was also one of the first buildings in Manchester to house telephone lines, and was once "the headquarters for the movement to license the sale of 'spirituous beverages'." It began as a tavern in 1790 called The Stagecoach Inn, before becoming Lockwood's Hotel circa 1850. In 1860, the building was renamed Thayer's Hotel by the new owner, Steven Thayer. It became the Fairview Hotel in 1902 and, in 1934, it was a hotel and antique shop run by the new owner Walter Clemons. In 1975, it was renamed Ye Olde Tavern by Peter and Susan Palmer, who renovated the place in time for the 1976 United States Bicentennial.

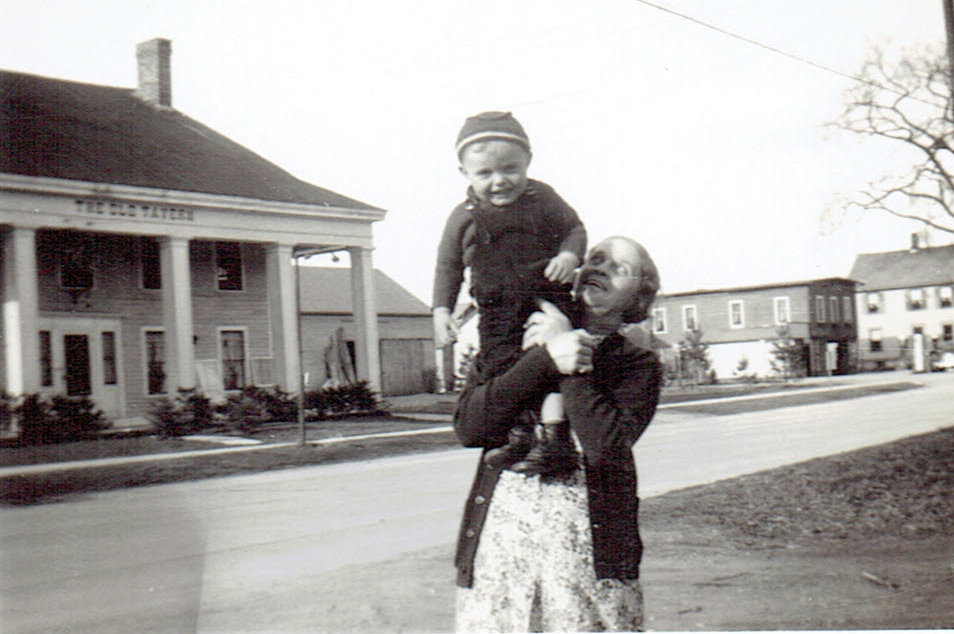
Bessie Elmer with her grandson Bob Wellman in front of Ye Olde Tavern, c. 1920s

Mark and Diedre Radicioni became the proprietors of Ye Olde Tavern around 1993. They took it over after losing their Grabbers Restaurant in Manchester to a fire. During their time as proprietors, Ye Olde Tavern was named the 1996 Restaurant of the Year by the National Restaurant Academy in the "Most Outstanding Value" category.

Michael and Minna Brandt have been the proprietors of Ye Olde Tavern since November 2001. The restaurant has a colonial setting and Michael Brandt commented, "When people step into the Ye Olde Tavern, it's like stepping back in time. The experience whisks you away to a bygone era." The tavern currently has seven dining rooms, two of which are upstairs, with ninety seats and a full bar.

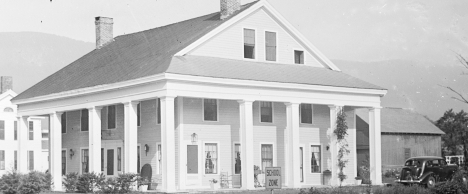
Early 1900s photo from Cemetery Road

In 2012, Ye Olde Tavern was recognized as a "Green Restaurant" by the State of Vermont.

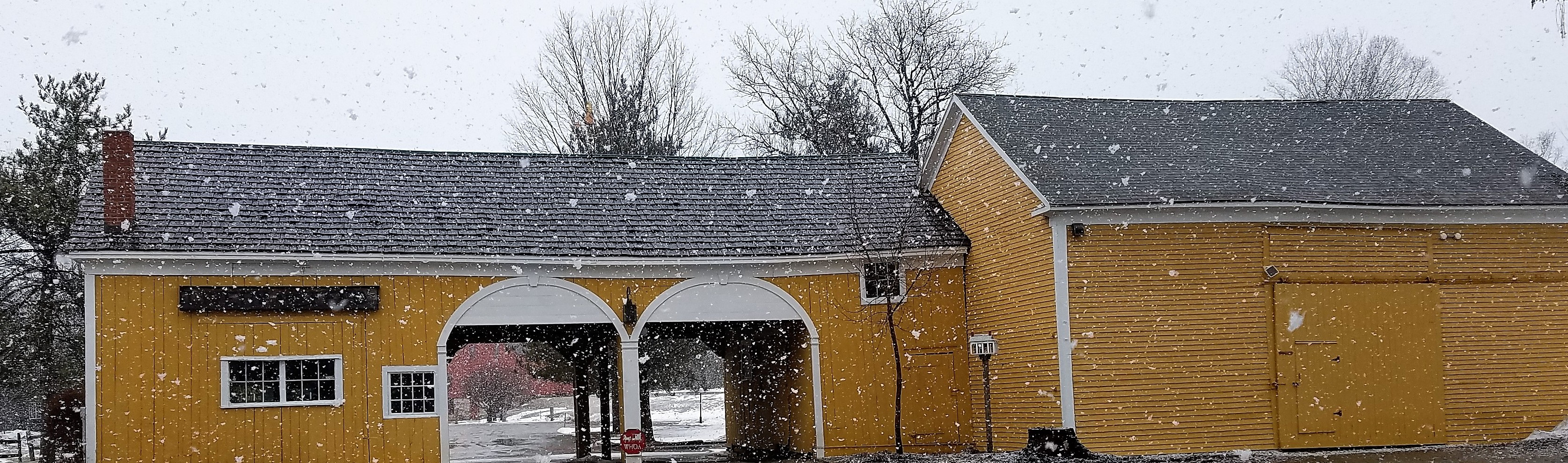
Ye Olde Tavern's historic barn during a snow, c. 2017

The Tavern's slogan is "Wining & Dining since 1790".

== Gallery ==
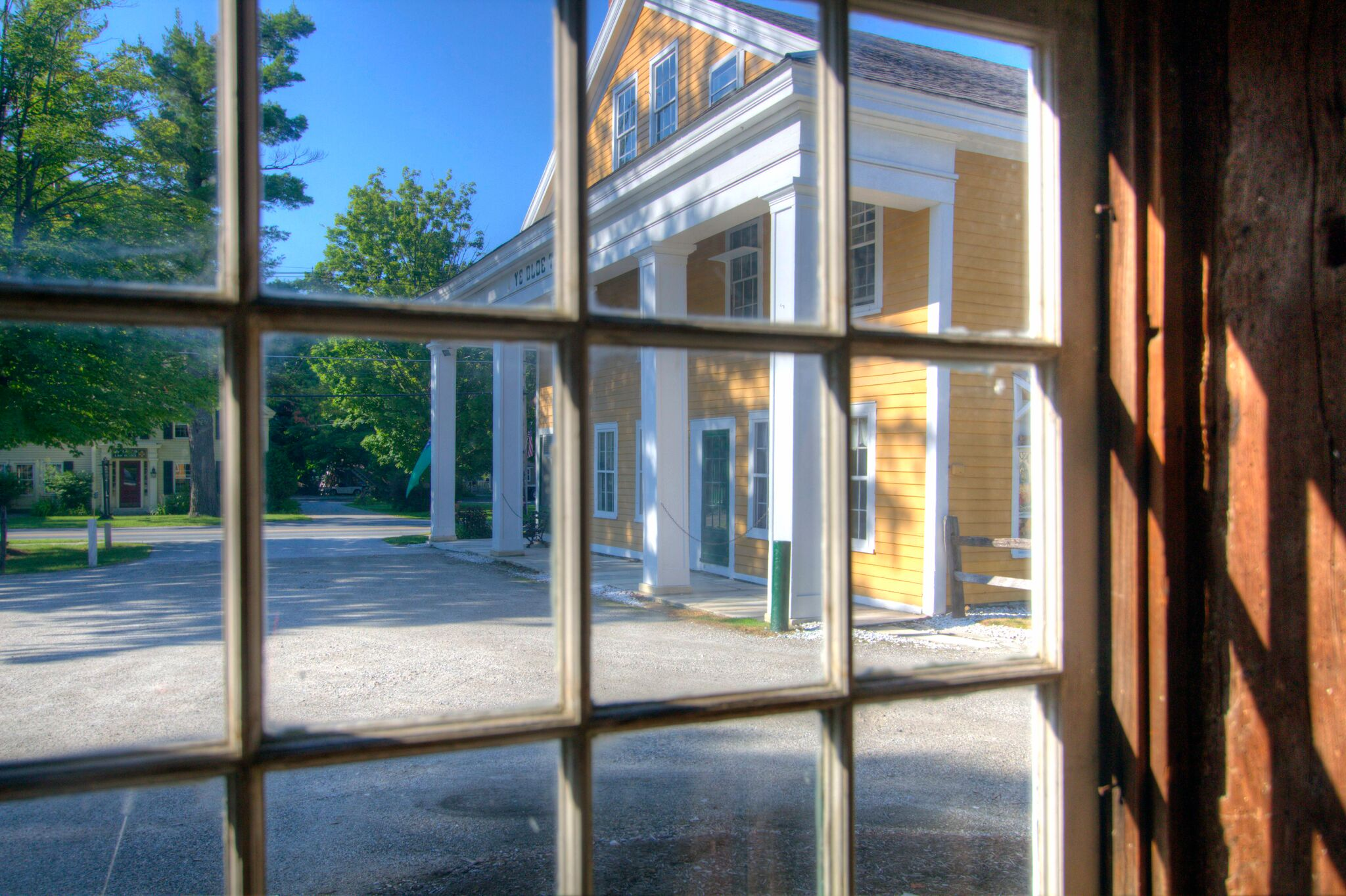
Ye Olde Tavern view from the barn

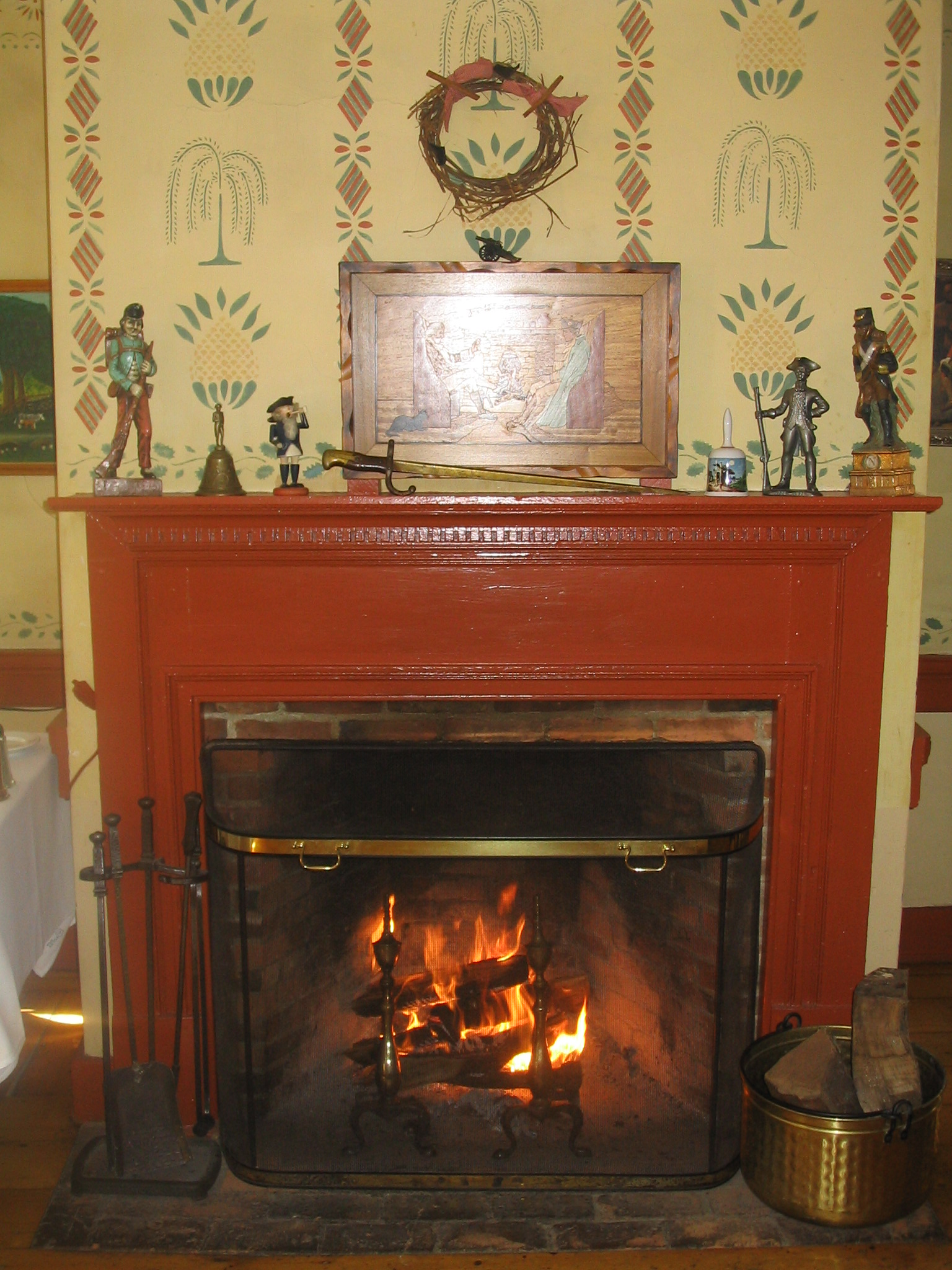
Fireplace in the Taproom with Moses Eaton stencil

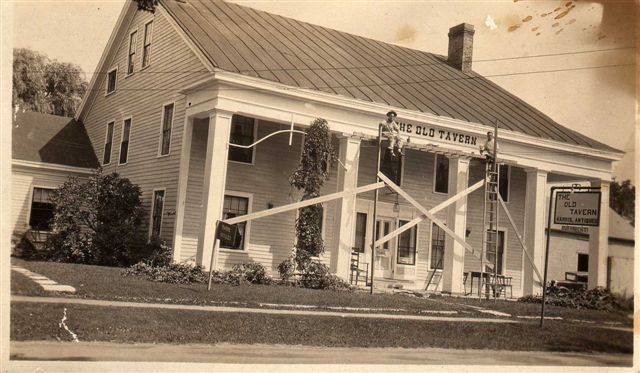
Tavern then named "The Old Tavern" being painted, circa 1940

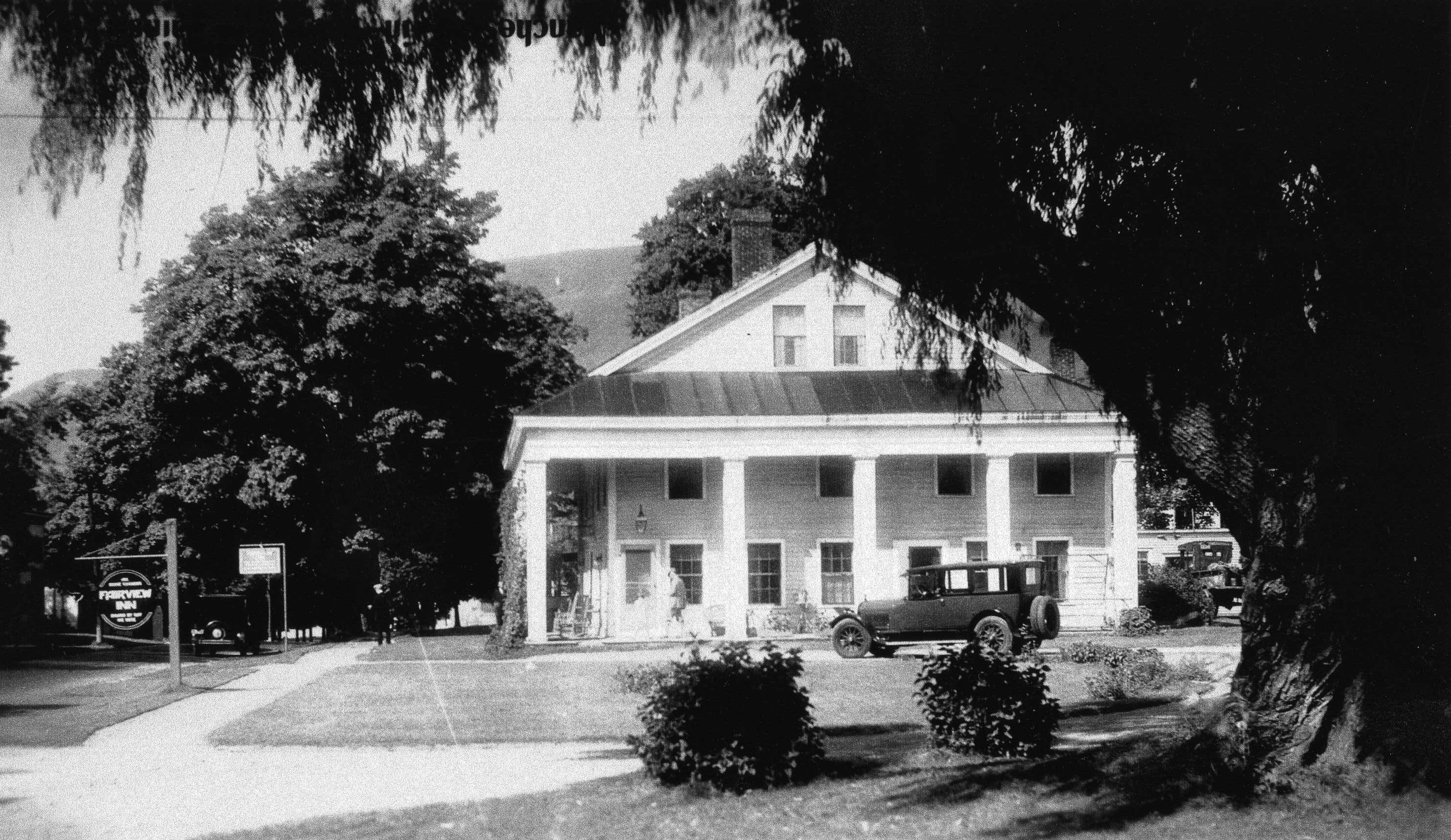
Side view of the Tavern, then named "Fairview Inn" circa 1930s

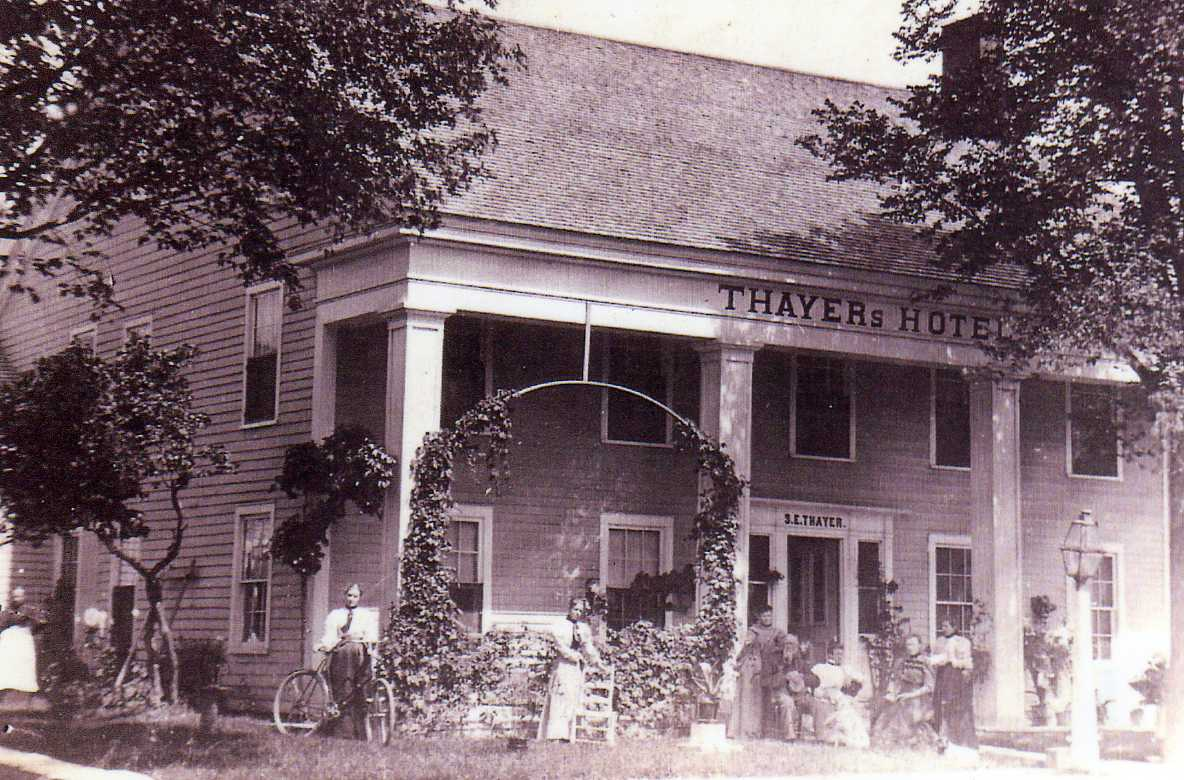
Tavern, then named "Thayer's Hotel," circa 1900

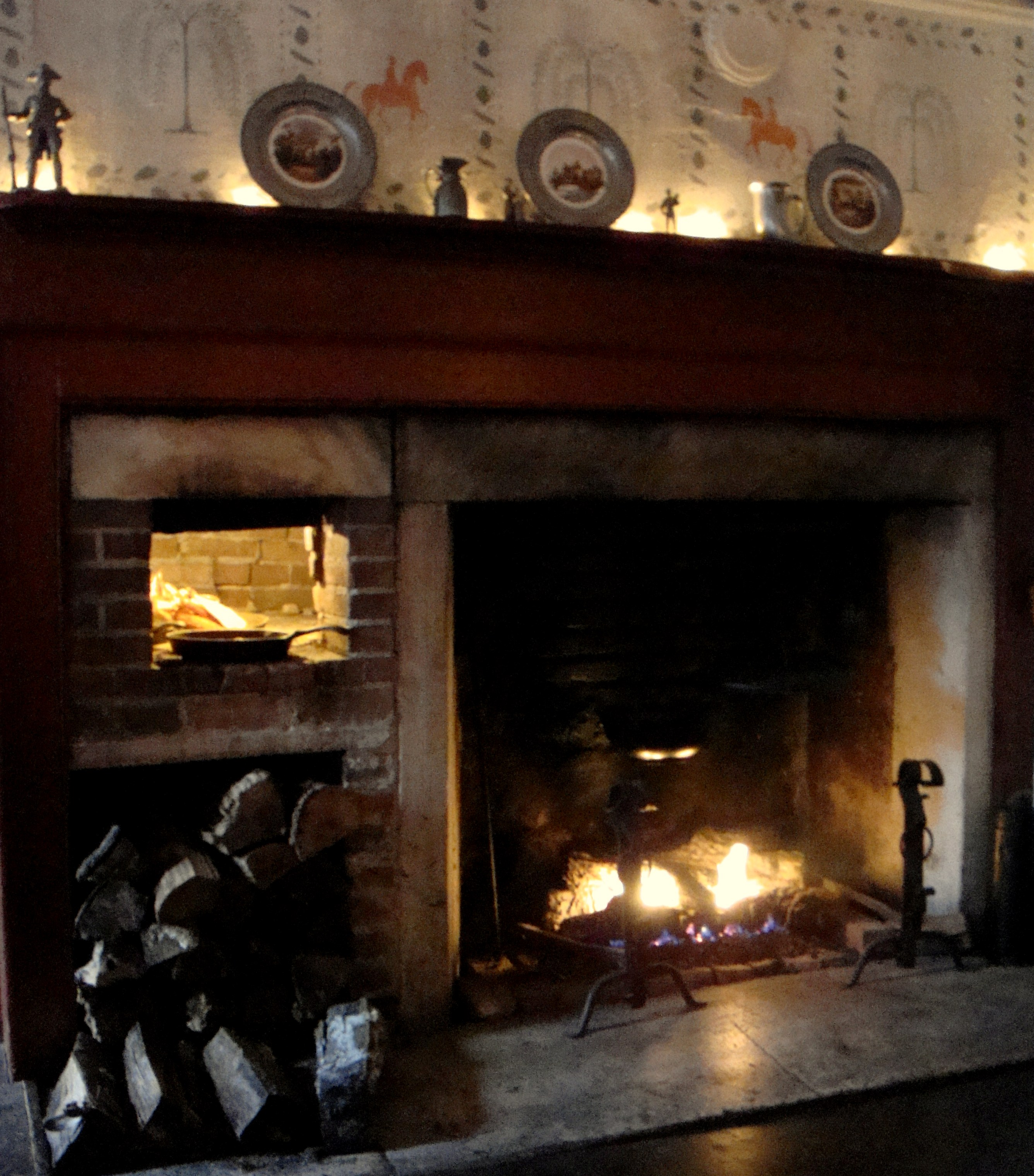
c. 1790 Hearth Fireplace, still works to this day

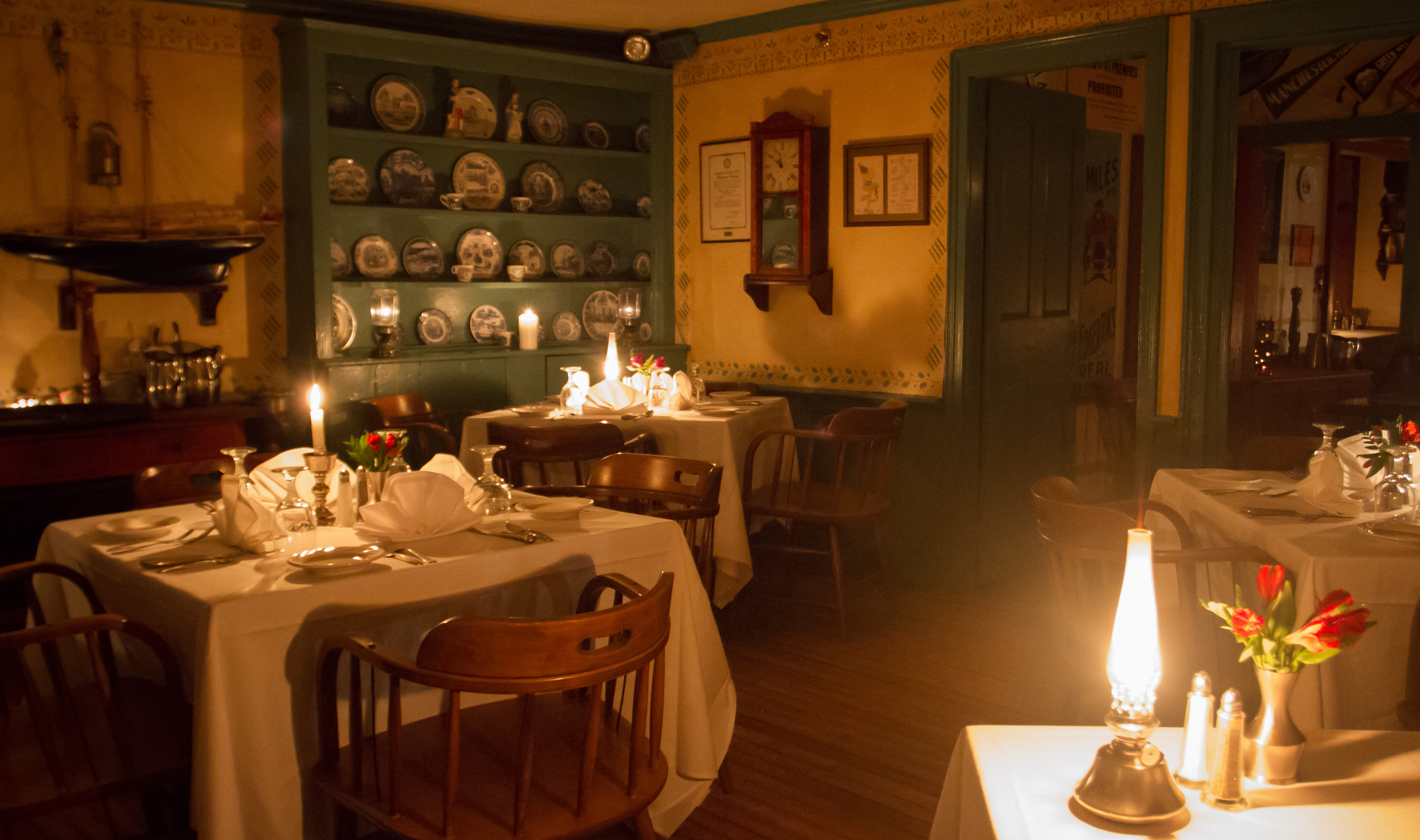
Originally where the Front Desk was is now a dining room.

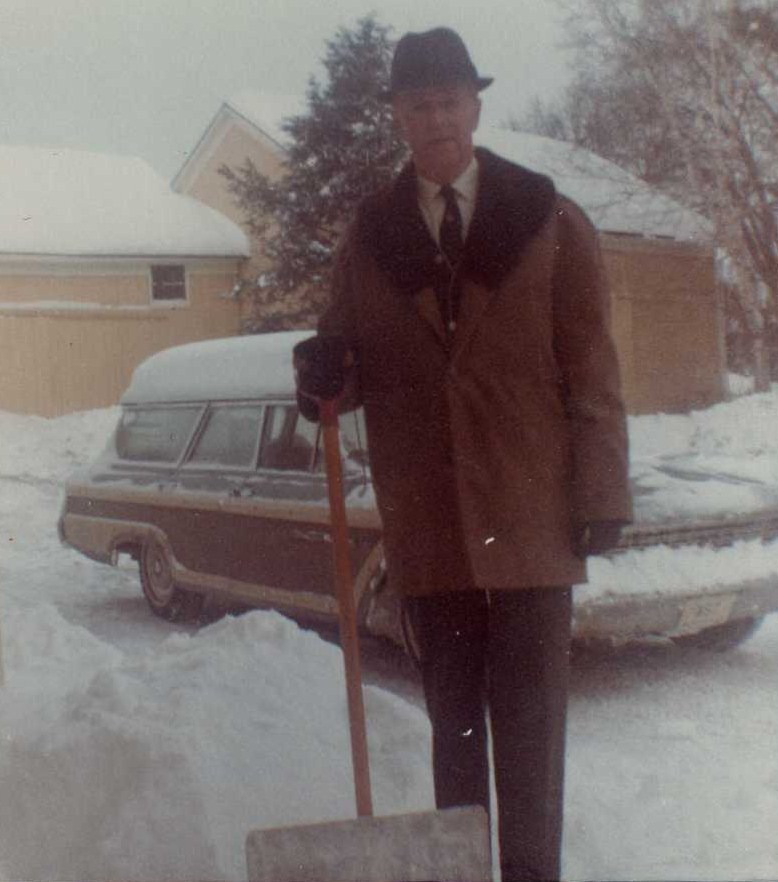
Walter Clemons was the proprietor of Ye Olde Tavern c. 1930s – 1974.
