= Old Stone House (Winooski, Vermont) =

Historic house in Vermont, United States

- U.S. National Register of Historic Places
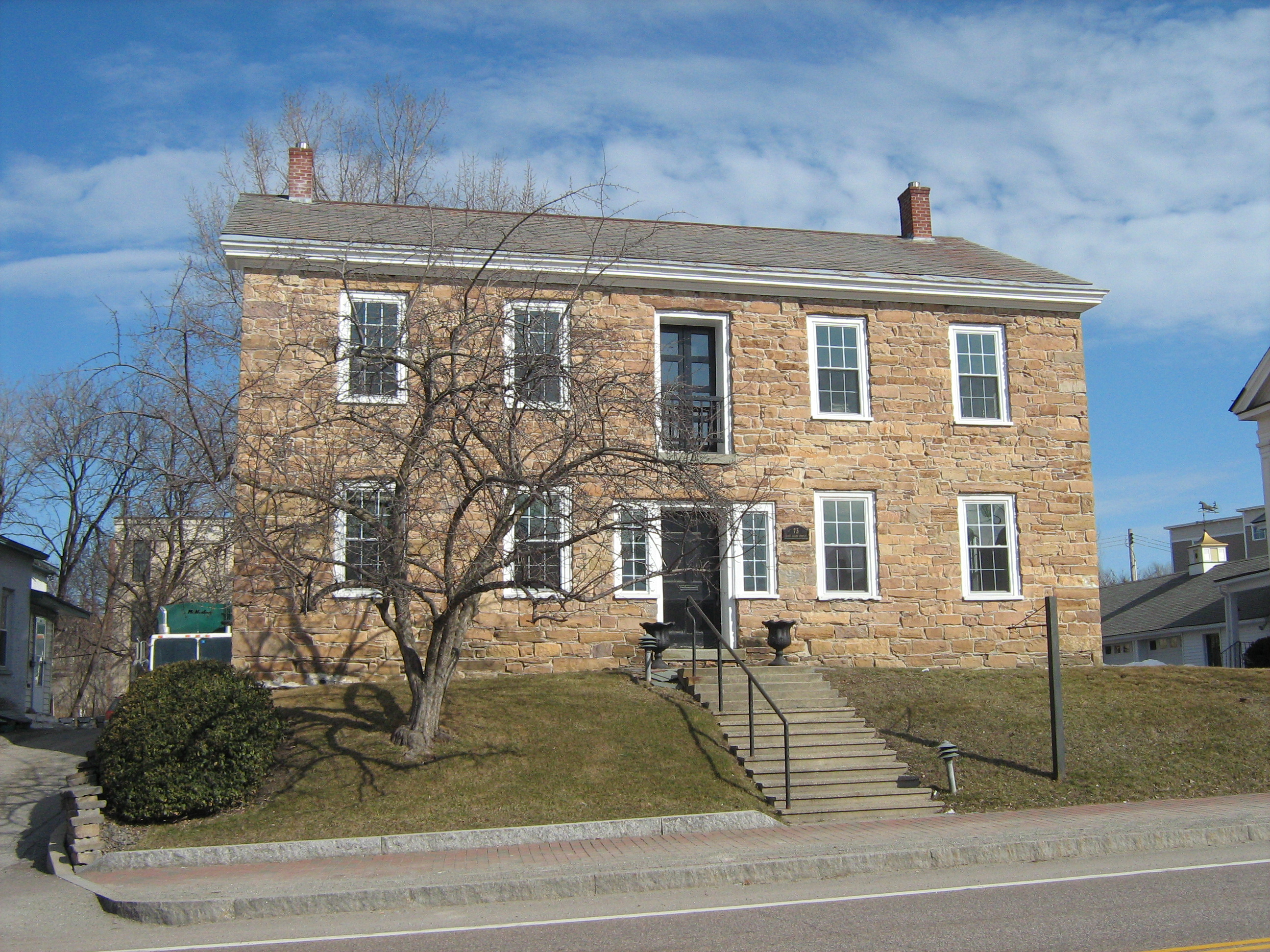

- Location within Vermont Location within the United States
- Location: 73 E. Allen St., Winooski, Vermont
- Coordinates: 44°29′28″N 73°11′1″W
- Area: less than one acre
- Built: 1789
- NRHP reference No.: 73000271
- Added to NRHP: May 8, 1973

The Old Stone House is a historic house at 73 East Allen Street in central Winooski, Vermont. Built around 1790, it is the city's oldest building. It has served as a tavern, as a residence, and now supports professional offices. It was listed on the National Register of Historic Places in 1973.

== Description and history ==
The Old Stone House stands a short way east of Winooski's central Rotary Park, on the north side of East Allen Street between Cascade Way and Abenaki Way. It is a 2 1/2-story structure, built out of rough-cut stone and capped by a side gable roof. It has a five-bay front facade, with sash windows in the outer bays set in rectangular openings. The front entrance is at the center, flanked by wide sidelight windows, and there is a second doorway above on the second level, set at a recess with an iron balustrade across the lower part of the opening. A wood-frame addition, nearly as old as the main block, extends to the rear.

The house was supposedly built around 1790 by Roswell Butler, and is the city's only surviving building from the period immediately following the American Revolutionary War. It served as a public accommodation (at times a tavern, but also for some time as a hotel) until 1826, with the rear addition added in 1793. It was then converted into a multi-unit residential apartment house, a use that was abandoned in the 1960s. It now houses professional offices.

== See also ==
- National Register of Historic Places listings in Chittenden County, Vermont
