= Pownal Center, Vermont =

Census-designated place in Vermont, United States

- Census-designated place
- Location within Vermont Location within the United States
- Coordinates: 42°47′52″N 73°13′17″W
- Country: United States
- State: Vermont
- County: Bennington
- Town: Pownal

Area
  - Total: 1.56 sq mi (4.03 km^{2})
  - Land: 1.56 sq mi (4.03 km^{2})
  - Water: 0 sq mi (0.0 km^{2})
- Elevation: 961 ft (293 m)
- Time zone: UTC-5 (Eastern (EST))
  - Summer (DST): UTC-4 (EDT)
- ZIP Code: 05261 (Pownal)
- Area code: 802
- FIPS code: 50-57100
- GNIS feature ID: 2807125

Pownal Center is an unincorporated community and census-designated place (CDP) in the town of Pownal, Bennington County, Vermont, United States. It was first listed as a CDP prior to the 2020 census. As of the 2020 census, Pownal Center had a population of 437.

It is located in southwestern Bennington County, in the geographic center of the town of Pownal. U.S. Route 7 is the main road through the village, leading north 6 miles (10 km) to Bennington and south 8 miles (13 km) to Williamstown, Massachusetts.
