= Maple Hill Farm =

- U.S. National Register of Historic Places
- Location within Vermont Location within the United States
- Location: 65 Maple Hill Road, Norwich, Vermont
- Coordinates: 43°44′6″N 72°18′4″W
- Area: 41.7 acres (16.9 ha)
- Built: c. 1789
- NRHP reference No.: 100005062
- Added to NRHP: March 16, 2020

The Maple Hill Farm is a historic farm property at 65 Maple Hill Road in Norwich, Vermont. Encompassing more than 40 acres (16 ha) of woodlands and pasture, the farm has more than 200 years of architectural history, including a late 18th-century farmhouse built by Peter Olcott, and two barns from that period. It remained an active farm property until 1966. The property was listed on the National Register of Historic Places in 2020.

== Description and history ==
Maple Hill Farm is located in a rural setting in northern Norwich, with the main farm complex located on the north side of Maple Hill Road between Union Village Road and Willey Hill Road. The farm house is a well-crafted Georgian structure, two stories in height, built of timber-frame construction and covered by a hipped roof. It has a two interior chimneys, and follows a conventional period floor plan with parlors on either side of a central stair hall. The farm complex includes three barns: two of these are English barns dating to the period of house (c. 1789), while the third is an early 20th-century dairy barn. The complex also includes a henhouse and corn crib. The farmland is divided into open fields and wood lots. The property is also believed to include the first homesite of Peter Olcott, located near the corner of Maple Hill and Union Village Roads.

The town of Norwich was established by New Hampshire Governor Benning Wentworth (as one of a series of New Hampshire Grants made pursuant to that colony's claim to the area) in 1761. Peter Olcott, a native of Connecticut, was one of the town's early proprietors, who moved to the town in 1772 with his family. He established a shop on land that he had purchased, and it formed part of what became Norwich's first town center. Olcott served in the American Revolutionary War, sat on the Governor's Council of the Vermont Republic, and as lieutenant governor of the state of Vermont. Olcott's family retained ownership of the farm only until 1835. The farm was given its name by the Coleman family, who purchased the property in 1870. Its use as a farm was ended in 1966 with the auctioning off of its equipment.

== See also ==
- National Register of Historic Places listings in Windsor County, Vermont
