= Hoosic River =

Hoosic River Hoos-ick
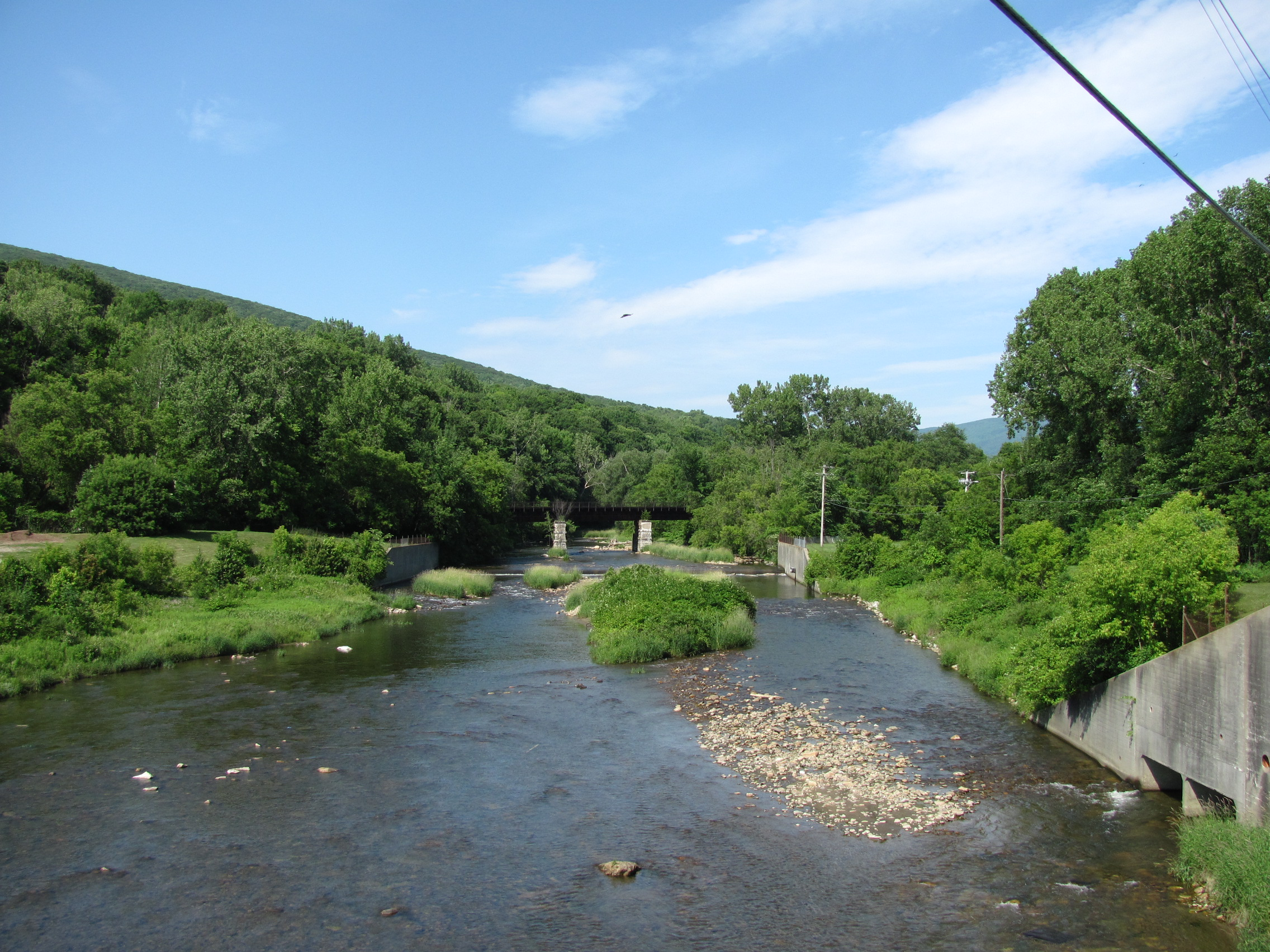
- Hoosic River in North Adams, Massachusetts

Location
- Country: United States
- State: Massachusetts, Vermont, New York
- Region: Hudson Valley

Physical characteristics
- Source: Cheshire Reservoir
  - location: Cheshire, Massachusetts
  - coordinates: 42°33′14″N 73°9′56″W
  - elevation: 970 ft (300 m)
- Mouth: Hudson River
  - location: Schaghticoke, New York
  - coordinates: 42°55′40″N 73°39′29″W
  - elevation: 65 ft (20 m)
- Length: 76 mi (122 km)
- Basin size: 720 mi^{2} (1,900 km^{2})
- Discharge
  - location: Eagle Bridge, New York
  - minimum: 160 cu ft/s (4.5 m^{3}/s)
  - maximum: 3,300 cu ft/s (93 m^{3}/s)

Basin features
- Tributaries
  - left: Green River, Little Hoosic River
  - right: North Branch Hoosic River, Walloomsac River

The Hoosic River, also known as the Hoosac, the Hoosick (primarily in New York) and the Hoosuck (mostly archaic), is a 76.3-mile-long (122.8 km) tributary of the Hudson River in the northeastern United States. The different spellings are the result of varying transliterations of the river's original Algonquian name. It can be translated either as "the beyond place" (as in beyond, or east of, the Hudson) or as "the stony place" (perhaps because the river's stony bottom is usually exposed except in spring, or perhaps because local soils are so stony).

== Watershed ==
The Hoosic River watershed is formed from tributaries originating in the Berkshire Hills of Massachusetts, the Green Mountains of Vermont, and the Taconic Mountains. The main (South) Branch of the river begins on the west slope of North Mountain and almost immediately fills the man-made Cheshire Reservoir in Berkshire County, Massachusetts. From there, the river flows north, west, and northwest, through the towns of Cheshire and Adams, the city of North Adams, and the town of Williamstown. It then travels through Pownal in the southwest corner of Vermont, after which it enters Rensselaer County, New York. There, it flows through the towns of North Petersburg and Hoosick, where it passes over a hydroelectric power dam in the village of Hoosick Falls. (There are also dams in Johnsonville, Valley Falls, and Schaghticoke.) The river provides the northwest border of the town of Pittstown, then flows through the town of Schaghticoke with its villages of Valley Falls and Schaghticoke before it terminates at its confluence with the Hudson 14 miles (23 km) above the city of Troy.

== Tributaries ==
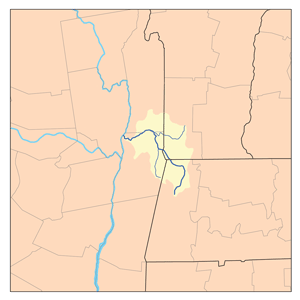
Map of the Hoosic River Watershed

- North Branch Hoosic River
- Green River
- Little Hoosick River
- Walloomsac River - Native American name, also Wal-loom-sac
- Owl Kill
- Wampecack Creek - Native American name, also Po-quam-pa-cak
- Tomhannock - Native American name, also Tom-he-nack
  - Sunkouissa Creek - Native American name, also Sank-an-is-sick

== See also ==
- List of rivers of Massachusetts
- List of rivers of New York
- List of rivers of Vermont
- Hudson–Hoosic Watershed
