= Petersburgh, New York =

Petersburgh
- Town
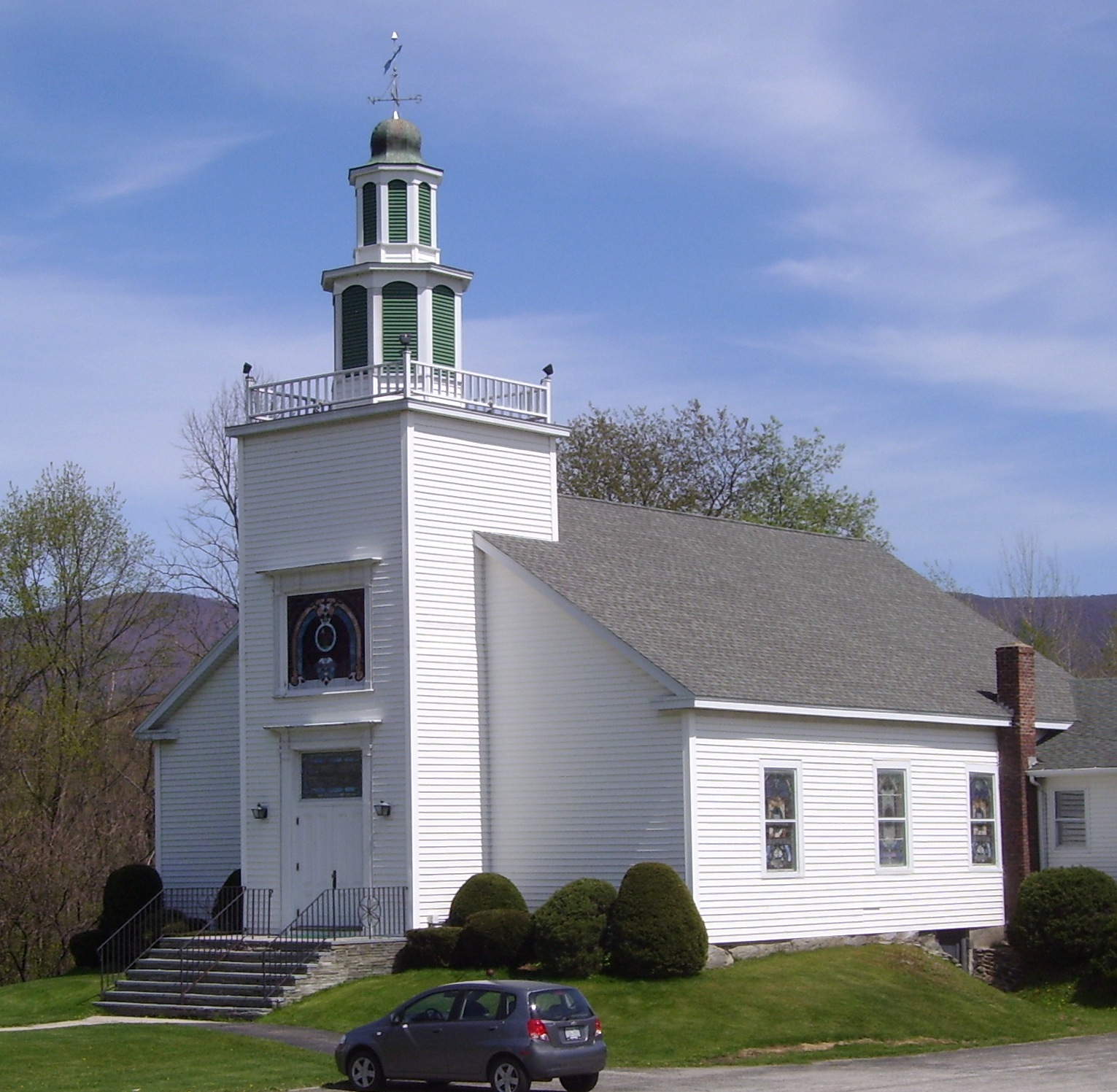
- Petersburg Baptist Church on Route 22 (2012)

- Location in Rensselaer County and the state of New York.
- Coordinates: 42°46′6″N 73°20′36″W
- Country: United States
- State: New York
- County: Rensselaer

Area
  - Total: 41.61 sq mi (107.78 km^{2})
  - Land: 41.61 sq mi (107.78 km^{2})
  - Water: 0.0039 sq mi (0.01 km^{2})
- Elevation: 554 ft (169 m)

Population (2020)
  - Total: 1,372
- Time zone: UTC-5 (Eastern (EST))
  - Summer (DST): UTC-4 (EDT)
- ZIP code: 12138
- Area code: 518
- FIPS code: 36-57441
- GNIS feature ID: 0979359

Petersburgh is a town located in the northeast section of Rensselaer County, New York, United States. The population was 1,372 at the 2020 census. The town was named after an early settler named Peter Simmons.

== History ==
The area was settled around the middle of the 18th century and was part of the Manor of Rensselaerswyck. The town was created in 1791 from the Town of Stephentown. The size of this town was diminished by the formation of other towns in the county, including the Towns of Berlin and Lansingburgh in 1806, and Grafton and Nassau in 1807.

The Petersburgh United Methodist Church was listed on the National Register of Historic Places in 2004.

== Geography ==
According to the United States Census Bureau, the town has a total area of 41.6 square miles (108 km^{2}), all land. To the east, the town borders on the states of Massachusetts and Vermont.

The Taconic Mountains cover the eastern portion of the town, while the Rensselaer Plateau covers the west. The Little Hoosick River joins the Hoosic River in the northern part of the town.

== Demographics ==
Historical population
Census	Pop.	Note	%±
1820	2,248		—
1830	2,011		−10.5%
1840	1,901		−5.5%
1850	1,908		0.4%
1860	1,698		−11.0%
1870	1,732		2.0%
1880	1,785		3.1%
1890	1,461		−18.2%
1900	1,449		−0.8%
1910	1,238		−14.6%
1920	1,066		−13.9%
1930	976		−8.4%
1940	955		−2.2%
1950	1,010		5.8%
1960	989		−2.1%
1970	1,187		20.0%
1980	1,369		15.3%
1990	1,461		6.7%
2000	1,563		7.0%
2010	1,525		−2.4%
2020	1,372		−10.0%
U.S. Decennial Census

As of the census of 2000, there were 1,563 people, 587 households, and 433 families residing in the town. The population density was 37.6 inhabitants per square mile (14.5/km^{2}). There were 695 housing units at an average density of 16.7 units per square mile (6.4 units/km^{2}). The racial makeup of the town was 98.08% White, 0.19% African American, 0.06% Native American, 0.90% Asian, 0.19% from other races, and 0.58% from two or more races. Hispanic or Latino of any race were 0.45% of the population.

There were 587 households, out of which 33.9% had children under the age of 18 living with them, 62.9% were married couples living together, 7.2% had a female householder with no husband present, and 26.1% were non-families. 21.1% of all households were made up of individuals, and 7.8% had someone living alone who was 65 years of age or older. The average household size was 2.66 and the average family size was 3.07.

In the town, the population was spread out, with 26.2% under the age of 18, 6.5% from 18 to 24, 28.3% from 25 to 44, 26.4% from 45 to 64, and 12.5% who were 65 years of age or older. The median age was 39 years. For every 100 females, there were 103.3 males. For every 100 females age 18 and over, there were 99.3 males.

The median income for a household in the town was $45,909, and the median income for a family was $49,125. Males had a median income of $35,500 versus $25,208 for females. The per capita income for the town was $21,249. About 9.8% of families and 12.3% of the population were below the poverty line, including 16.8% of those under age 18 and 10.3% of those age 65 or over.

== Communities and locations ==
- North Petersburgh – A hamlet in the northern part of the town on Routes 22 and 346. The Steller Homestead is found at the intersection of Route 22 and Rabbit College Road. The U.S. Postal Service treats the name as unacceptable in mailing addresses, preferring "Petersburg".
- Petersburgh (or Petersburg) – A hamlet on Routes 2 and 22, including the town hall. It was formerly called "South Petersburg" and "Rensselaer Mills", and USPS prefers the Petersburg spelling.
- The following hamlets are not officially recognized by USPS:
  - Petersburgh Junction – By the northern town line.
  - Stillman – Northwest of Petersburgh village on Route 2.

== Notable person ==
- Lydia Baxter (1809–1874), poet
