= Arlington Village Historic District =

Arlington Village Historic District may refer to:

- Arlington Village Historic District (Arlington, Virginia), List of RHPs in VA|listed on the NRHP in Virginia
- Arlington Village Historic District (Arlington, Vermont), listed on the NRHP in Vermont
- East Arlington Village Historic District, Arlington, Vermont, listed on the NRHP in Vermont
