= USS Catamount =

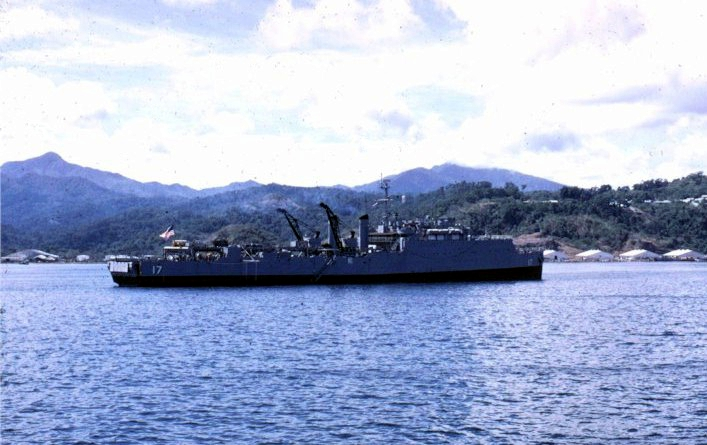
- USS Catamount (LSD-17) at Subic Bay, Philippines, in 1967.

History

United States
- Name: USS Catamount
- Namesake: Catamount Tavern in Old Bennington, Vermont
- Launched: 27 January 1945
- Commissioned: 9 April 1945
- Decommissioned: 31 March 1970
- Stricken: 15 October 1976
- Fate: Sold for scrap, 4 December 1975

General characteristics
- Displacement: 7,930 tons (loaded), 4,032 tons (light draft)
- Length: 457 ft 9 in (139.5 m) overall
- Beam: 72 ft 2 in (22.0 m)
- Draft: 8 ft 2½ in (2.5 m) fwd, 10 ft ½ in (3.1 m) aft (light); 15 ft 5½ in (4.7 m) fwd, 16 ft 2 in (4.9 m) aft (loaded)
- Propulsion: 2 Babcock & Wilcox boilers, 2 Newport News Shipbuilding Steam Turbines, 2 propeller shafts - each shaft 3,700 hp, at 240 rpm total shaft horse power 7,400, 2 11 ft 9 in diameter, 9 ft 9 in pitch propellers
- Speed: 17 knots (31 km/h)
- Range: 8,000 nmi. at 15 knots; (15,000 km at 28 km/h)
- Boats & landing craft carried: 3 × LCT (Mk V or VI); each w/ 5 medium tanks or; 2 × LCT (Mk III or IV); each w/ 12 medium tanks or; 14 × LCM (Mk III); each w/ 1 medium tank; or 1,500 long tons cargo or; 47 × DUKW or; 41 × LVT or; Any combination of landing vehicles and landing craft up to capacity
- Capacity: 22 officers, 218 men
- Complement: 17 officers, 237 men (ship); 6 officers, 30 men (landing craft)
- Armament: 1 × 5 in / 38 cal. DP gun; 2 × 40 mm quad AA guns; 2 × 40 mm twin AA guns; 16 × 20 mm AA guns
- Aircraft carried: modified to accommodate helicopters on an added portable deck

USS Catamount (LSD-17) was a Casa Grande-class dock landing ship of the United States Navy, named in honor of the Catamount Tavern in Old Bennington, which served as headquarters for Ethan Allen's Green Mountain Boys while making their plans against the New Yorkers and the British. The Catamount was also the meeting place of Vermont's only form of government then: the Vermont Council of Safety.

Catamount was launched on 27 January 1945 by Newport News Shipbuilding and Dry Dock Co., Newport News, Va., sponsored by Mrs. Dave E. Satterfield, Jr.; commissioned on 9 April 1945 and reported to the U.S. Pacific Fleet.

Catamount sailed out of Pearl Harbor on 16 June 1945 laden with landing craft for Guam and Eniwetok. Through the remainder of the war, she ferried landing craft, dredges, and other equipment from Espiritu Santo to Kwajalein, Guam, and the Philippines. On 19 August she cleared Guam with special equipment to be used in the occupation of Japan, and on 26 August she stood up Tokyo Bay. Here she operated a boat pool and tended landing craft until 6 October, when she cleared on the first of two voyages to Manila to ferry troops and boats for the Japanese occupation. After a final voyage from Guam to Samar, Catamount cleared for San Francisco and Norfolk, where she arrived 11 February 1946. Joining the Atlantic Fleet, Catamount took part in amphibious training and midshipman cruises until the outbreak of the Korean War.

== Korean War ==
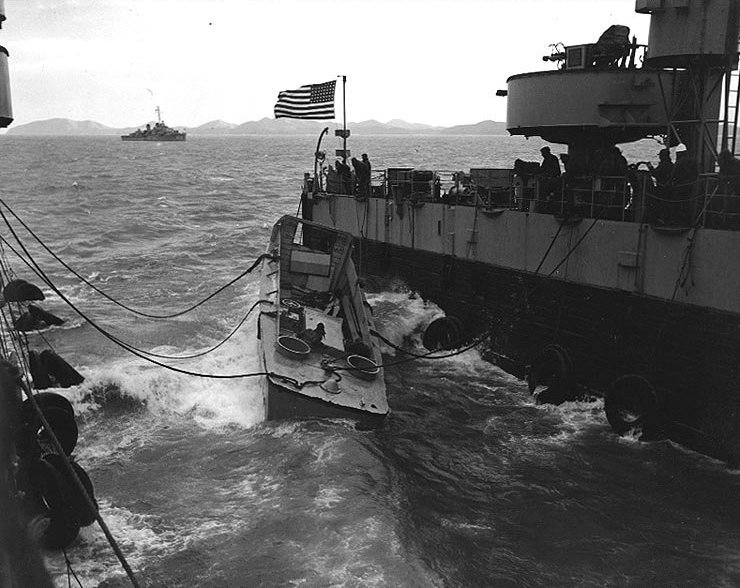
An LCVP bucks in the well of Catamount, during mine clearance operations off Chinnampo, North Korea, in November 1950. The destroyer USS Forrest Royal (DD-872) is in the background.

Leaving Norfolk on 15 August 1950, Catamount called at San Diego en route Kobe where she embarked marines bound for the invasion of Inchon. In the landings at Wonsan, Catamount sailed with the important repair and salvage group. It was in November 1950, that Catamount achieved a notable first, when, as part of Commander Stephen M. Archer's Task Element 95.69, she became the first LSD to take part in minesweeping operations, at Chinnampo, port city of P'yŏngyang. It was essential that this port be opened so that the advancing U.S. Eighth Army ashore could be supplied by sea, and all types of minesweepers were summoned for the urgent task. Catamount served as tanker and supply ship to this varied fleet, as well as mothering a swarm of LCVPs which were able to sweep waters too shallow for larger craft.

In December 1950, Catamount took part in the withdrawal of marines and soldiers from Hungnam to Pusan, then returned to Yokosuka, Japan to replenish. She returned to tend landing craft at Korean ports through April 1951, when she began duty transporting equipment and supplies from Sasebo to Inchon and Pusan. On 31 May, she cleared Yokosuka for an overhaul at San Diego.

Catamount had two more tours of duty in the Korean War, from 3 November 1951 to 24 July 1952, and from 29 October 1952 to 8 April 1953. She made her first post-war tour from 5 August 1953 to 18 April 1954. During each of these tours, she tended small craft, and transported personnel, as well as taking part in exercises off Japan and Okinawa. From her base at San Diego, she conducted local operations, and in the summer of 1954, made two voyages to Naknek, Alaska, with landing craft and oil barges.

== 1955 – 1965 ==
On 3 January 1955, Catamount cleared for the Far East once again, arriving at Yokosuka 25 January. Almost at once she sailed for the Taiwan Straits to take part in the evacuation of the Tachen Islands early in February. She returned to San Diego 24 April. After local operations, she spent 16 January to 30 August 1956 in the central Pacific in Operation Redwing, a series of nuclear tests. In the summer of 1957, Catamount sailed from Seattle on resupply missions to stations of the Distant Early Warning Line (DEW Line) in the Arctic.

From 12 June to 8 December 1958, she cruised in the Far East once more, returning for duty off the coast of southern California. Among her assignments was qualifying helicopter pilots in landings on ships of her type, and participating in amphibious landing exercises based on the relatively new concept of vertical envelopment. Special operations off the northwest coast of the United States and British Columbia in the spring and summer of 1959 preceded a deployment to Hawaii for amphibious training. Later in the year she was overhauled in Portland, Oregon, returning to operations from San Diego 25 March 1960.

After a brief period of operations and supplementary overhaul in San Diego, Catamount sailed on 25 June on a special mission, carrying landing craft to southern Chile, devastated by the Great Chilean earthquake. Transferred to the Chilean Navy, these landing craft provided critically needed transportation in regions where piers had been destroyed by tsunami. Catamount returned to San Diego on 13 August, operated on the west coast and on 22 November sailed for another tour with the U.S. 7th Fleet in the Far East.

== Vietnam War ==
Catamount served several tours in the Vietnam War.

Catamount was decommissioned on 31 March 1970, and struck from the Naval Register on 15 October 1976. She was sold for scrapping, 4 December 1975 by the Defense Reutilization and Marketing Service (DRMS) for $178,148.15 to Max Rouse & Sons, Beverly Hills, Calif.

Catamount received seven battle stars for Korean War service and seven campaign stars for Vietnam War service.
