= Martin Chester Deming =

American businessman and politician (1789–1851)

Member of the Vermont House of Representatives for Arlington
- In office 1830–1832
- Preceded by: Anson Canfield
- Succeeded by: Asahel Hurd

Personal details
- Born: February 15, 1789 Arlington, Vermont Republic
- Died: June 21, 1851 (aged 62) Arlington, Vermont, U.S.
- Party: National Republican (until c. 1834); Whig (after 1835)
- Spouse: Pamela Baker (m. 1813)
- Children: 5, including Sylvester
- Education: Middlebury College (AB, AM)

Martin Chester Deming (February 15, 1789 – June 21, 1851) was an American businessman, railroad magnate, and politician who served in the Vermont House of Representatives from 1830 until 1832, representing the town of Arlington in Bennington County. He was a member of the National Republican Party and the Whig Party. In addition to his political career, Deming also held key positions in the regional banking and railroad industries.

== Biography ==
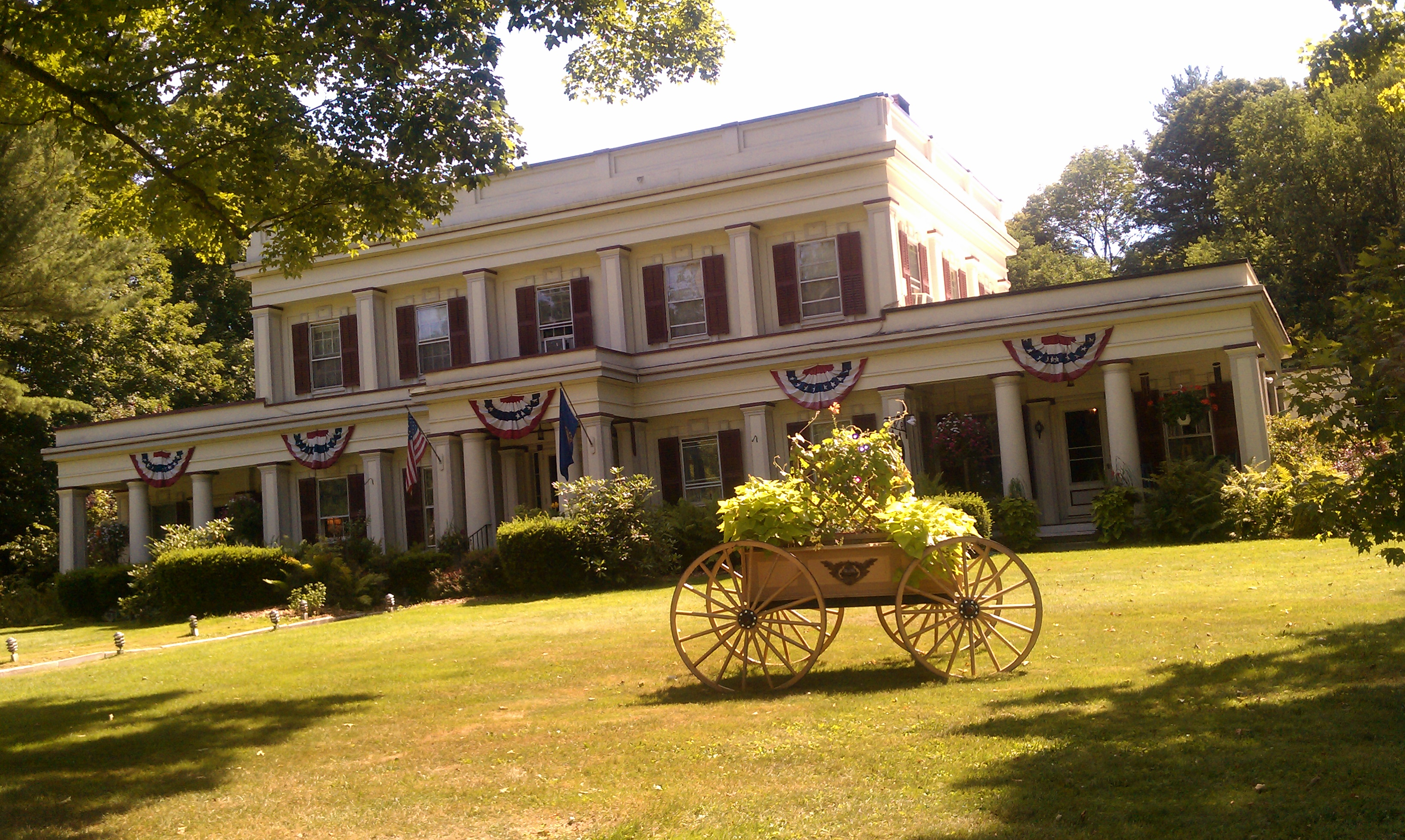
The Martin Deming House in 2010

Martin Chester Deming was born on February 25, 1789, in the town of Arlington, Vermont. His parents were Sylvester and Chloe Hard Deming. After graduating from Middlebury College in 1812 with both a bachelor's and a master's degree, he began working as a merchant and became a partner in the law firm Judson and Deming. During this period, he also held several prominent positions in Arlington: from 1816 until 1823, he was the town's postmaster, and he also served as a selectman at some point. In 1828, the Vermont General Assembly appointed him one of Arlington's justices of the peace.

Deming was elected to represent Arlington in the Vermont House of Representatives in 1830. He was re-elected in 1831, and left office in 1832. While in the legislature, he served on the Ways and Means Committee. A member of the National Republican Party, Deming was appointed one of three members of the party's Bennington County committee at the 1832 state party convention. He later became a member of the Whig Party, attending state and county party conventions in 1835, 1840, and 1850. Deming was also a substitute member of Vermont's delegation to the 1844 Whig National Convention in Baltimore, Maryland. From 1836 until 1838, he served as the judge of probate for the District of Manchester.

A prominent businessman in the region, Deming held several key positions with local banks. He was a commissioner of the Bank of Bennington and the Battenkill Bank, and was a member of the board of directors of the Bank of Manchester and the Bennington County Mutual Fire Insurance Company. In addition, he owned land across Vermont, and was president of the Stratton Turnpike Company. Deming was also a key figure in the Vermont railroad industry. In 1849, he was the presiding officer of a meeting in which it was decided to connect Bennington and Rutland via a railroad running through the Batten Kill valley. The following year, he was named to the first board of directors of the Western Vermont Railroad; through his position, he convinced the railroad to travel directly through Arlington Village instead of following a route through East Arlington.

In 1839, Deming ran as a Whig candidate for the Vermont Senate. Due to his bank connections, he was heavily criticized by the Vermont Gazette, who accused his campaign of being influenced by the banks. The newspaper also wrote that Deming did not have "one principle or feeling in harmony with republicanism, a drop of democratic blood never warmed [his] heart", and that he was an aristocrat "trained in the old federal doctrine". Deming was defeated by the Democratic Party ticket. In 1841, Deming ran for the Council of Censors, an irregularly elected body that conducted periodic oversight reviews of the state government. Campaigning in support of President William Henry Harrison's economic reform movement, he was elected, receiving 8,504 votes. While on the council, he was tasked with oversight over the state legislature and taxes and expenditures. In 1850, Deming was a member of the Vermont Constitutional Convention.

Deming died in Arlington on June 21, 1851. His house in the town, the Martin Deming House, was constructed in 1848. Considered by the Society of Architectural Historians to be "a remarkable example of Greek Revival domestic architecture", the house cost $4,800 to build, "an astronomical amount for the period in rural Vermont"; upon seeing its "ostentatious character", his father allegedly became so outraged that he threatened to burn it down. The house remained in the family until 1925, when it was sold and converted into an inn, now known as the Arlington Inn. The Martin Deming House is a contributing structure to the Arlington Village Historic District.

On April 15, 1813, Deming married Pamela Baker, and they had five children. One of his sons, Sylvester Deming, served in the Vermont House of Representatives in 1863 and 1864. Deming was a prominent member of the Episcopal Church in Vermont, and was a delegate to the church's state convention in 1822.
