= Gideon Adams =

Loyalist and Upper Canada politician

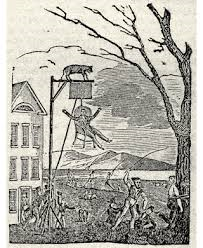
- A woodcut of the father of Gideon Adams, Dr. Samuel Adams, the future British Loyalist and American Revolutionary War, military leader of Adams' Rangers, who was publicly humiliated in 1774, by being tied to a chair and hung from the sign of the Catamount Tavern, in Arlington, New Hampshire Grants, in present-day Vermont, for falling out of favor with his enemies, the Green Mountain Boys, over land dealings, in early Vermont
- Born: 1755; Connecticut Colony, British North America, British Empire, present-day Connecticut
- Died: (1834 aged 79); South Gower Township, Upper Canada, British North America, British Empire, present-day North Gower Township, Ontario, Canada
- Occupations: farmer, soldier, politician
- Relatives: Dr. Samuel Adams (father), 3 brothers

Gideon Adams (February 11, 1755 – June 20, 1834) was a farmer, soldier, Justice of the Peace and politician in Upper Canada, British North America, British Empire, now Ontario, Canada.

Gideon Adams was born in Connecticut, in 1755 and moved with his family, in 1764, to Arlington, in the New Hampshire Grants. He served, during the American Revolution, as an ensign, in his father's British Loyalist, military company, Adams' Rangers, and later, as a Lieutenant, with Jessup's Loyal Rangers. Following the war, along with other, Loyalist families, Gideon Adams and his family settled in Edwardsburg Township, later moving to South Gower Township, Upper Canada, British North America, British Empire, now North Gower Township, Ontario, Canada in 1818. Adams was named a justice of the peace, in the Eastern District of Ontario in 1796. He also, served, as a major, in the local, Canadian militia, during the War of 1812. Adams represented Grenville, in the 6th Parliament of Upper Canada. Gideon Adams died, in South Gower Township, Upper Canada, in 1834.
