= AMHS =

AMHS may refer to:

== Schools ==
- Academic Magnet High School
- Albertus Magnus High School
- Alexander Mackenzie High School
- Alexandria Monroe High School
- Amityville Memorial High School
- Arabia Mountain High School
- Archbishop MacDonald High School
- Archbishop McCarthy High School
- Archbishop Mitty High School
- Archbishop Molloy High School
- Archbishop Murphy High School
- Arlington Memorial High School
- Auburn Mountainview High School
- August Martin High School
- Avon Middle High School, a high school in Norfolk County, Massachusetts

== Other ==
- Aeronautical Message Handling System or more precisely ATS Message Handling System (air traffic control)
- Alaska Marine Highway System
- Anatomically modern Homo sapiens
- Automated Message Handling System
- Automated Material Handling System; see FOUP
