= Adams' Rangers =

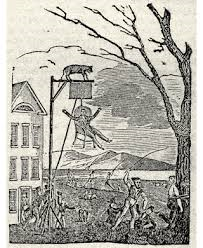
- A woodcut of Dr. Samuel Adams, the future British Loyalist and American Revolutionary War military leader of Adams' Rangers, who was publicly humiliated in 1774 by being tied to a chair and hung from the sign of the Catamount Tavern in Arlington, New Hampshire Grants, in present-day Vermont, for falling out of favor with his enemies, the Green Mountain Boys, over land dealings in early Vermont
- Active: 1777-1780
- Country: Great Britain
- Allegiance: Great Britain
- Branch: Loyalist local volunteer corps
- Type: infantry (auxiliary troops)
- Role: scouting
- Size: company (70 men) and officers
- Part of: British Army under generals John Burgoyne, Simon Fraser, Baron Riedesel
- Garrison/HQ: Province of Quebec
- Nickname(s): Adams’ Company of Rangers
- Engagements: American Revolutionary War: Saratoga Campaign (1777); Battle of Saratoga (1777)

Commanders
- Notable commanders: Captain Samuel Adams Captain Jeptha Hawley; Lieutenant Simpson Jenne Ensign Gideon Adams

Adams' Rangers, also known as Adams’ Company of Rangers, were a British Loyalist local volunteer corps and independent military company raised to support the British Army during the American Revolutionary War. Led by Dr. Samuel Adams of Arlington, New Hampshire Grants (now Vermont), the Rangers made their most significant contribution to the British war effort by serving with the ill-fated Burgoyne Expedition in the Saratoga campaign of 1777.

== Company formed ==
The soldiers of Adams's Rangers were recruited primarily from the region of the New Hampshire Grants (also known by the Patriots as the Republic of Vermont), with the largest number of recruits coming from Arlington under heavy opposition from the majority Patriot population and their old enemies, the Patriot Green Mountain Boys. Dr. Adams later stated that he had raised 70 men for the company. Either late in the Burgoyne campaign or in early 1778, the Rangers absorbed a body of soldiers from the Bateaux Service, under Jeptha Hawley, who was also from Arlington.

== Campaigns ==
In 1777, Adams' Rangers were a part of the scouting service during the Saratoga Campaign. Very little has been recorded concerning the activities of the unit during the disastrous campaign, but Loyalist claims made by men of the Ranger company described piloting the army, running dispatches between British commanders, raiding cattle from Rebel farms, and defending Loyalist farms from Patriot foraging parties.

After the British Army's defeat and surrender at Saratoga, Adams' Rangers and other Loyalist units were allowed to retreat to the Province of Quebec. For the next three years Adams' men, like most other Loyalist troops in Canada, were occupied with garrison duty and employed in work parties improving the defences of the Province. Several of the soldiers and their families lived at the refugee camp at the Machiche, near Trois-Rivières, Quebec. In early 1778, the company numbered 37 all-ranks — by mid-1780, their number had been reduced to 27.

== Company Officers ==
Captains
Dr. Samuel Adams of Arlington, New Hampshire Grants Jeptha Hawley of Arlington, New Hampshire Grants
Lieutenant
Simpson Jenne of Clarendon, Vermont Arlington, New Hampshire Grants
Ensign
Gideon Adams of Arlington, New Hampshire Grants

== Company disbanded ==
Frustrated by lack of prospects and dispersement of his men around the Province, Captain Adams demanded to be allowed to join his company to Robert Rogers' King's Rangers or go to New York to serve in the Central department. When his demands were refused, Adams disbanded his men in late October 1780. Following the dissolution of the Adam's Rangers, a few of the men from the company joined the King's Rangers, but the majority were absorbed into McAlpin's Corps, a collection of under-strength Loyalist units. In November 1781, these British units were consolidated into a new Provincial regiment, the Loyal Rangers, commanded by Major Edward Jessup.

== Resettled in British Canada ==
Following the war, a few of Adam's men returned to the United States. Some settled in Quebec around Sorel, but most were granted land in southeastern Ontario along the St. Lawrence River. The largest concentration of former Adam's Company men settled in Ernestown and Edwardsburg Townships.
