= Samuel Adams (Loyalist) =

British loyalist of the American Revolution (1730–1810)

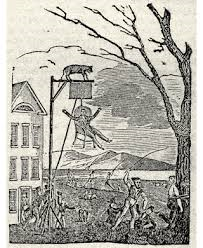
- A woodcut of the 1774 public humiliation of Dr. Samuel Adams, the British Loyalist and American Revolutionary War military leader of Adams' Rangers. Adams was tied to a chair and hung from the sign of the Catamount Tavern in Arlington, New Hampshire Grants, in present-day Vermont, for falling out of favor with his enemies, the Green Mountain Boys, over land dealings in early Vermont
- Born: 1730; Stratford, Fairfield County, Connecticut Colony, British North America, British Empire, present-day Stratford, Fairfield County, Connecticut
- Died: January 1810 (aged 79–80); Edwardsburgh, Upper Canada, British North America, present-day Edwardsburgh, Ontario, Canada
- Other name: Dr. Samuel Adams
- Occupations: Physician, surgeon, farmer, land owner, soldier
- Years active: 1777–1783
- Children: 4 sons; Gideon Adams
- Military career
- Allegiance: Great Britain
- Branch: British Army
- Service years: 1776-1777
- Rank: Captain
- Commands: Adams' Rangers
- Conflicts: American Revolutionary War: Lake Champlain Campaign (1776); Battle of Valcour Island (1776); Saratoga Campaign (1777); Battle of Saratoga (1777)

Dr. Samuel Adams (1730 – January, 1810) was a physician, surgeon, farmer, land owner, and loyalist soldier, from Arlington, Vermont.

== Early life ==
Samuel Adams was born in Stratford, Fairfield County, Connecticut Colony, British North America, British Empire, now Stratford, Fairfield County, Connecticut, in 1730.

== New Hampshire Grants ==
In 1764, he moved with his family to Arlington in the New Hampshire Grants. On several occasions, Adams served as representative and negotiator, for Arlington and the other surrounding towns.

== Conflict with Green Mountain Boys ==
In 1774, Adams came into conflict with Ethan Allen's Green Mountain Boys for dissenting with their land title policy. After a brief trial, Adams' captors had him tied to a chair and hung from the sign post, of the Catamount Tavern, as a public humiliation.

== American Revolutionary War service ==
In 1776, Dr. Adams was captured by Whigs, for his British Loyalist sympathies and he and his sons were imprisoned. Adams escaped and fled north, to Canada, reaching the British lines, in Quebec. Joining the King's Army, Adams served, during the Battle of Valcour Island, during Lake Champlain Campaign, in 1776 and raised an independent, Loyalist company, known as Adams' Rangers, which served, under British General John Burgoyne, in the Saratoga campaign of 1777. Four of Adams' sons served in his ranger company, with his eldest son Gideon Adams, acting as ensign.

== Exile in British Canada ==
Following the war, Adams and his sons settled in the province of Upper Canada now present-day Southeastern Ontario, Canada alongside other disbanded British Loyalist troops and their families. Adams ran a tavern in Montreal, serving British troops and expatriates.

== Death ==
In January, 1810, Samuel Adams died in Edwardsburgh, Upper Canada, British North America, British Empire, now Edwardsburgh, Ontario, Canada, at the age of 80.
