= Arlington (CDP), Vermont =

Census-designated place in Vermont, United States

Arlington, Vermont
- Census-designated place
- Location within Vermont
- Coordinates: 43°03′51″N 73°08′10″W
- Country: United States
- State: Vermont
- County: Bennington
- Towns: Arlington, Sunderland

Area
  - Total: 3.74 sq mi (9.68 km^{2})
  - Land: 3.68 sq mi (9.53 km^{2})
  - Water: 0.058 sq mi (0.15 km^{2})
- Elevation: 814 ft (248 m)

Population (2010)
  - Total: 1,213
  - Density: 330/sq mi (127.3/km^{2})
- Time zone: UTC-5 (Eastern (EST))
  - Summer (DST): UTC-4 (EDT)
- ZIP codes: 05250 (Arlington); 05252 (East Arlington)
- Area code: 802
- FIPS code: 50-01375
- GNIS feature ID: 2378119
- Arlington Village Historic District
- U.S. National Register of Historic Places
- U.S. Historic district
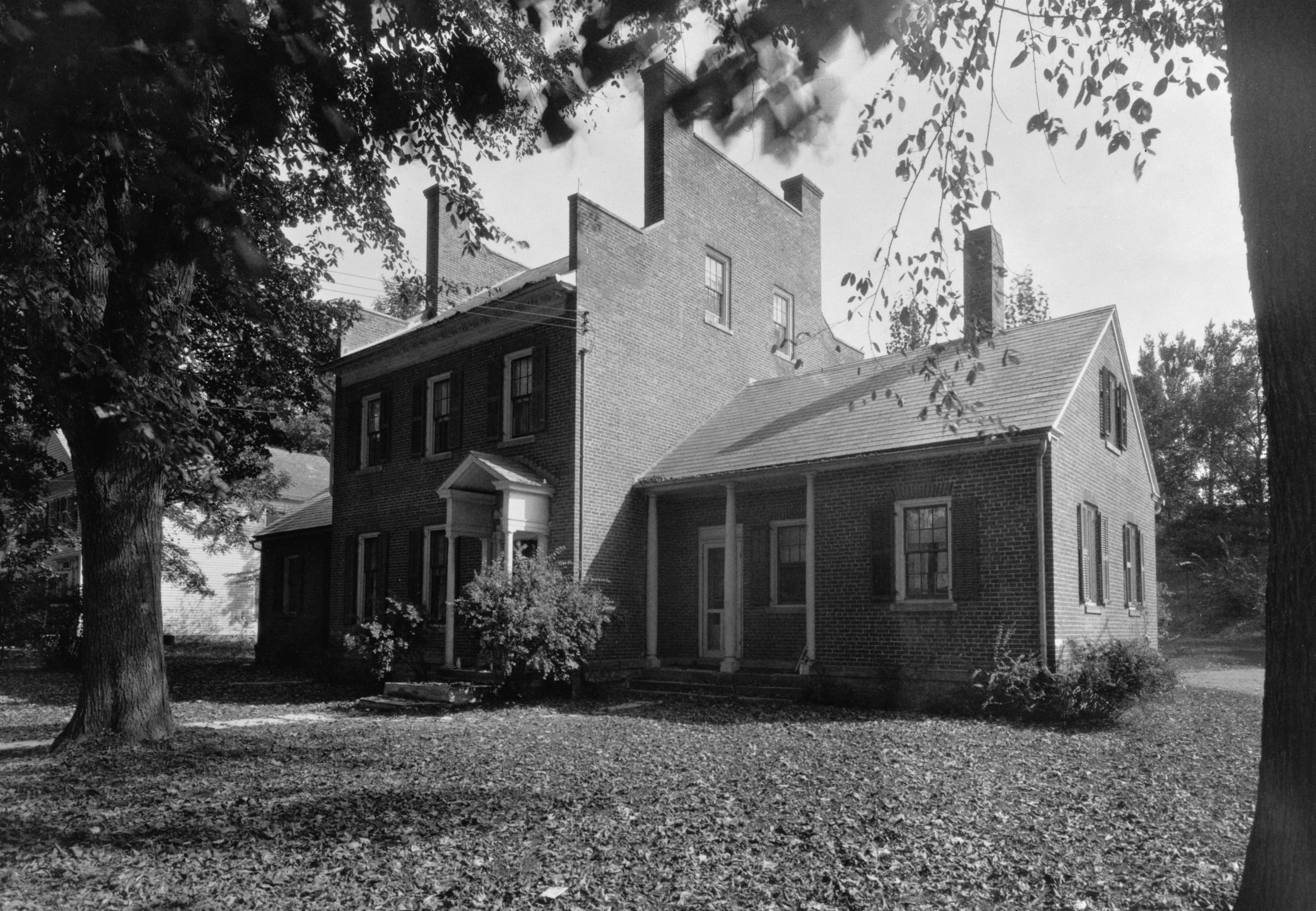
- The Smith-Canfield House, a prominent house in the district
- Location: Roughly Main St., School St., E. Arlington Rd., and Battenkill Dr., Arlington, Vermont
- Coordinates: 43°4′22″N 73°9′23″W
- Area: 180 acres (73 ha)
- Architect: William Passman, et al.
- Architectural style: Colonial Revival, Greek Revival, Federal
- NRHP reference No.: 89001936
- Added to NRHP: November 02, 1989

Arlington is a census-designated place (CDP) in the towns of Arlington and Sunderland, Bennington County, Vermont, United States. The population was 1,213 at the 2010 census.

In 1989, the Arlington Village Historic District was listed on the National Register of Historic Places. The district covers an area of 180 acres (73 ha) and includes 190 contributing buildings and sites in the village center. In addition to historical and architectural significance, the district is also noted for being the place where composer Carl Ruggles spent the later years of his life. The buildings in the district provide examples of Colonial Revival, Greek Revival, and Federal styles. The St. James Episcopal Church (1829–30), the second oldest Gothic Revival church in Vermont, is located in Arlington village. In the early 20th century, the village was an important industrial center with several mills and factories, many of which were washed away by flooding in 1927. The village also has unusual sections of marble sidewalks, laid using stone from nearby quarries.

== Geography ==
The Arlington CDP covers Arlington village, the primary settlement in the town of Arlington, and extends eastward to include the community of East Arlington, reaching partially into the town of Sunderland. Arlington village is located on the south bank of the Batten Kill in the Valley of Vermont, with the Taconic Mountains to the west and the Green Mountains to the east.

Vermont Route 7A is the main road through the village, leading north to Manchester and south to Bennington. Vermont Route 313 leads west from the village center, to West Arlington and the New York state line. U.S. Route 7 bypasses the village to the east, with access from VT 313 south of the village.

According to the United States Census Bureau, the CDP has a total area of 3.7 mi^{2} (9.6 km^{2}), all land.

== Demographics ==
As of the census of 2000, there were 1,199 people, 516 households, and 327 families residing in the CDP. The population density was 125.5 people/km^{2} (325 people/mi^{2}). There were 599 housing units at an average density of 62.7 units/km^{2} (162 units/mi^{2}). The racial makeup of the CDP was 97.25% White, 0.50% Black, 0.08% Native American, 0.67% Asian, 0.17% Pacific Islander, 0.08% from other races, and 1.25% from two or more races. Hispanic of any race were 0.25% of the population.

There were 516 households, out of which 26.4% had children under the age of 18 living with them, 49.6% were married couples living together, 10.1% had a female householder with no husband present, and 36.6% were non-families. 31.6% of all households were made up of individuals, and 15.1% had someone living alone who was 65 years of age or older. The average household size was 2.32 and the average family size was 2.92.

In the CDP, the population was spread out, with 22.4% under the age of 18, 7.3% from 18 to 24, 26.5% from 25 to 44, 26.7% from 45 to 64, and 17.1% who were 65 years of age or older. The median age was 41 years. For every 100 females, there were 87.6 males. For every 100 females age 18 and over, there were 84.5 males.

The median income for a household in the CDP was $32,321, and the median income for a family was $41,607. Males had a median income of $26,731 versus $20,000 for females. The per capita income for the CDP was $20,357. About 9.4% of families and 8.9% of the population were below the poverty line, including 13.6% of those under age 18 and 6.5% of those age 65 or over.

== See also ==
- National Register of Historic Places listings in Bennington County, Vermont
