= First Congregational Church of Bennington =

Historic church in Vermont, United States

- Old First Congregational Church of Bennington
- U.S. National Register of Historic Places
- U.S. Historic district – Contributing property
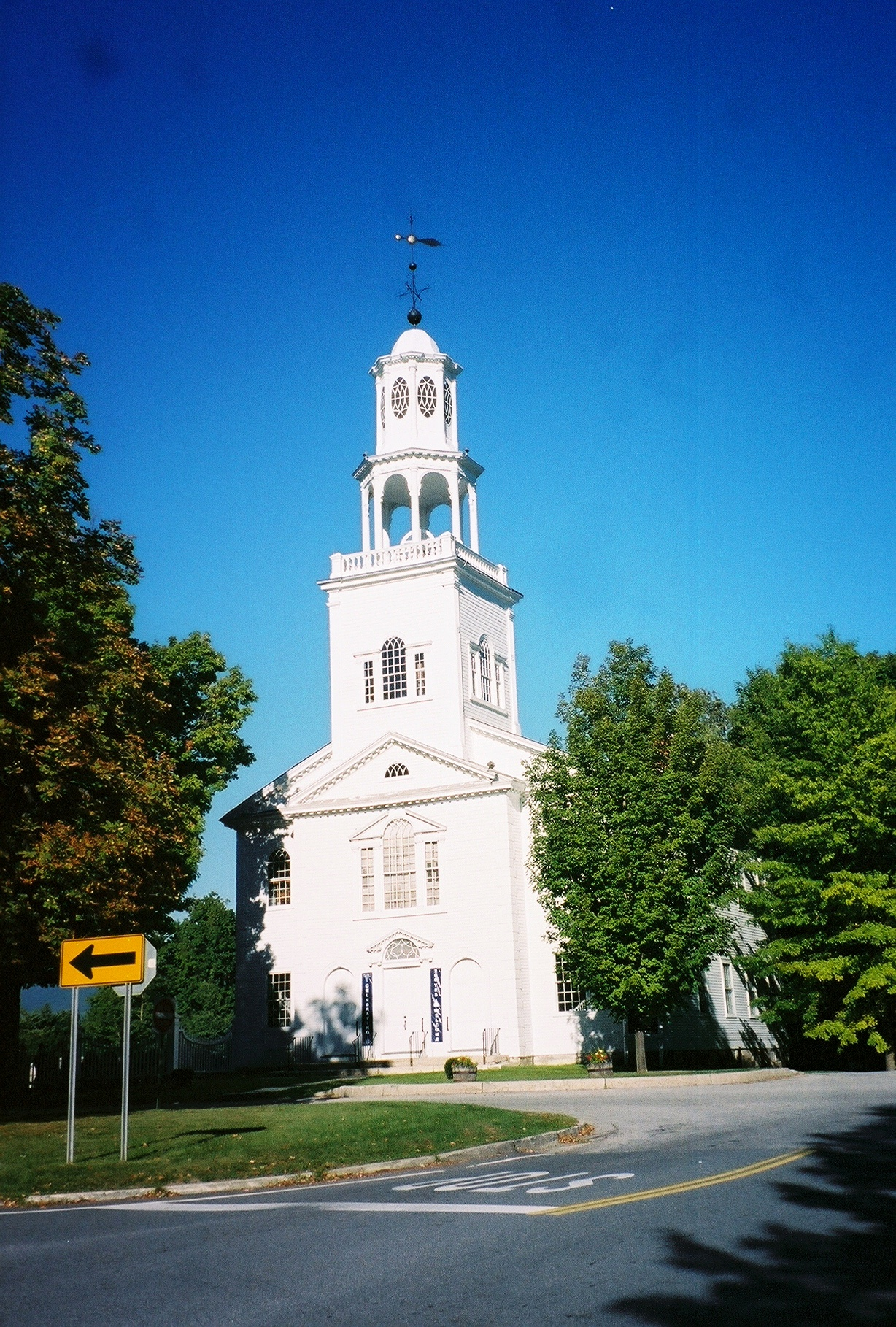
- September 2005

- Location within Vermont Location within the United States
- Location: 1 Monument Circle, Bennington, Vermont
- Coordinates: 42°53′0″N 73°12′48″W
- Area: 1.5 acres (0.61 ha)
- Built: 1805
- Architect: Lavius Fillmore
- Architectural style: Georgian, Federal
- Part of: Old Bennington Historic District (ID84000030)
- NRHP reference No.: 73000186

Significant dates
- Added to NRHP: April 24, 1973
- Designated CP: October 4, 1984

The First Congregational Church of Bennington, also known as the Old First Church, is a historic church in Old Bennington, Vermont. The congregation was organized in 1762 and the current meeting house was built in 1805. The building, one of the state's best examples of Federal period religious architecture, was added to the National Register of Historic Places in 1973.

== Description ==
The Old First Church occupies a prominent position facing the green in the center of Old Bennington, at the junction of Monument Avenue and Church Lane near the southern end of the green. It is a two-story rectangular wood-frame structure, with a projecting entry vestibule and multi-stage tower.

The gabled roof has a modillioned eave, and the exterior is finished in wooden clapboards with quoined corners. The entry vestibule is also gabled, with two round-arch entrances flanking a larger central entrance, which is topped by a rounded transom and gable.

The second level of the vestibule has a large Palladian window with broken pediment above, including a half-round window. The tower has pilastered corners, with a smaller Palladian window in the first stage, an open second stage octagonal belfry, and an octagonal cupola at the top.

== History ==
In 1762, the church congregation was organized.

In 1766, the congregation's first meeting house was built.

In 1805, due to increased participation, the current building, with a seating capacity of 650 persons, was built, funded by the sale of pews and local levies. It was designed by builder Lavius Fillmore, who apparently borrowed heavily from Plate 35 of Asher Benjamin's The Country Builder's Assistant.

== Bennington Centre Cemetery ==
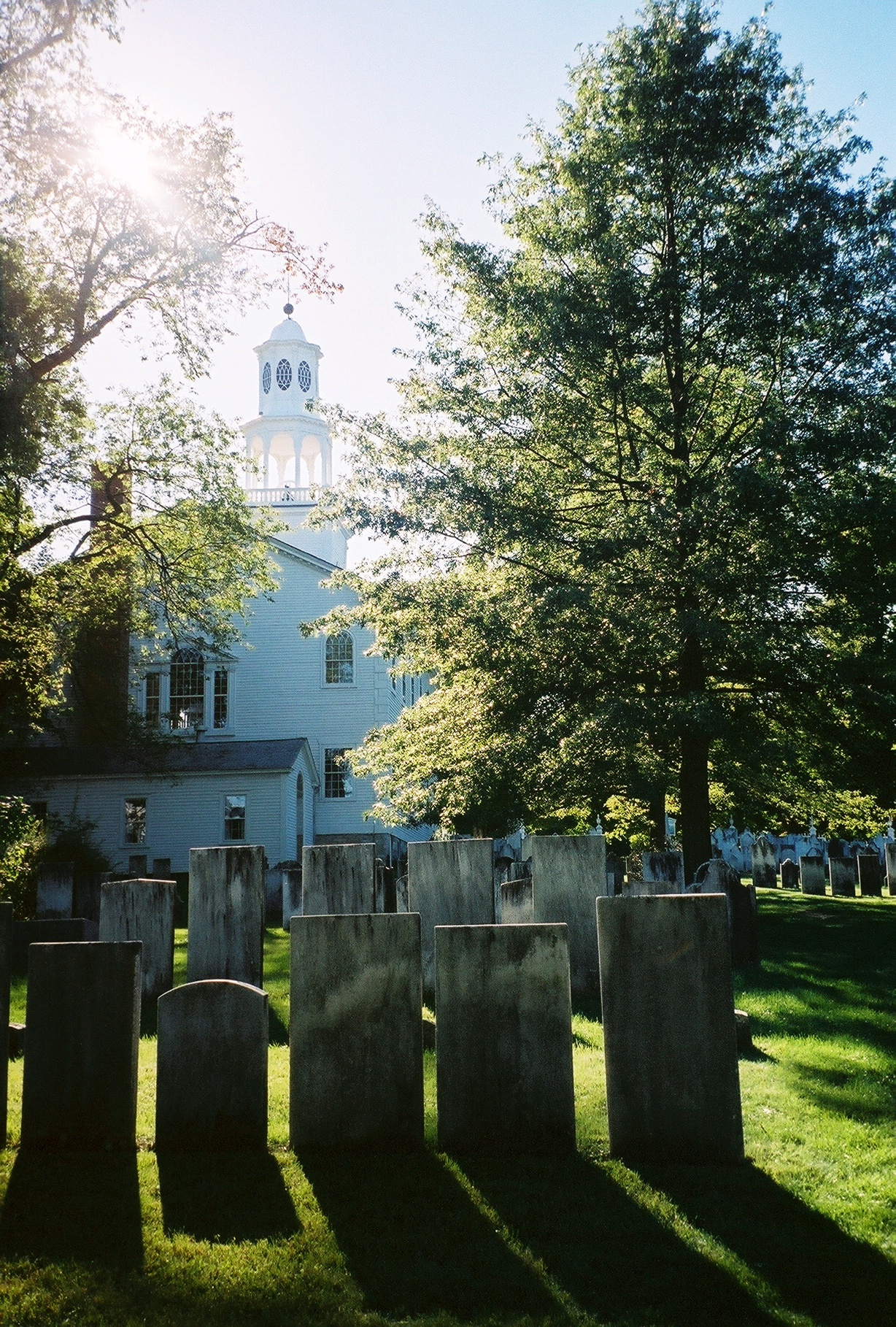
View from cemetery in rear (September 2005).

The adjacent Bennington Centre Cemetery was designated by the Vermont legislature as "Vermont's Sacred Acre".

The cemetery is often mistakenly referred to as the Old Bennington Cemetery, but, other than being adjacent to and established in the same year, has no provenance with the church.

It is the burial site of poet Robert Frost.

== See also ==
- National Register of Historic Places listings in Bennington County, Vermont
