= Arlington Village Historic District (Arlington, Virginia) =

Historic district in Virginia, United States

- U.S. National Register of Historic Places
- U.S. Historic district
- Virginia Landmarks Register
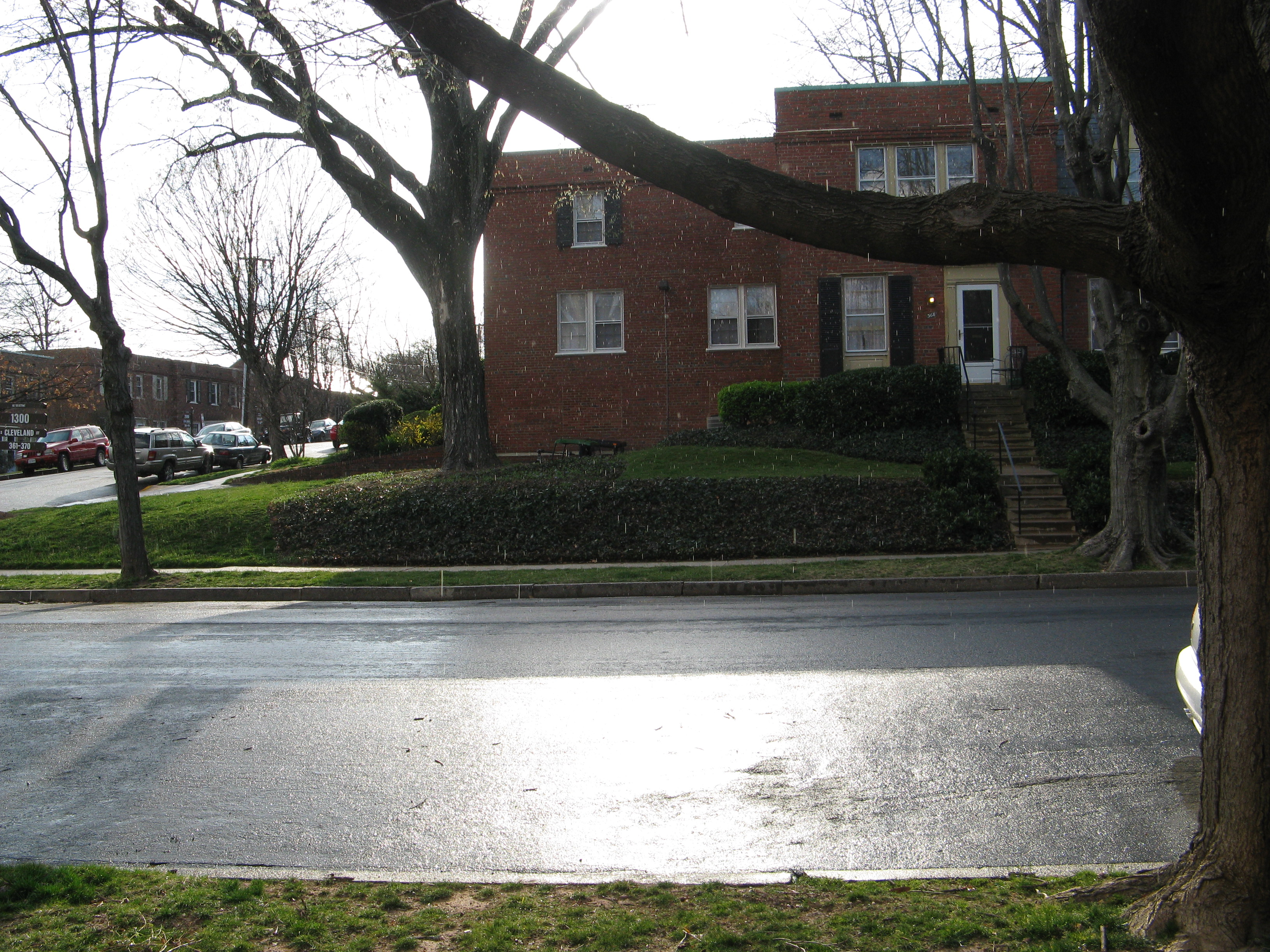
- Arlington Village, March 2012

- Location within District of Columbia Location within Virginia Location within the United States
- Location: S. 13th St., S. 13 Rd., S. 16th St., S. Barton S., S. Cleveland St. and Edgewood St., Arlington, Virginia
- Coordinates: 38°51′33″N 77°5′2″W
- Area: 53 acres (21 ha)
- Built: 1936-1939
- Architect: Ring, Gustave; Warwick, Harvey
- Architectural style: Colonial Revival
- MPS: Garden Apartments, Apartment Houses and Apartment Complexes in Arlington County, Virginia MPS
- NRHP reference No.: 03000215
- VLR No.: 000-0024

Significant dates
- Added to NRHP: April 11, 2003
- Designated VLR: December 4, 2002

The Arlington Village Historic District is a national historic district located at Arlington County, Virginia. It contains 657 contributing buildings (including 656 apartment units) in a residential neighborhood in South Arlington. The area was constructed in 1939, and is a planned garden apartment community that incorporates recreational areas, open spaces, a swimming pool, and courtyards within five superblocks. It also includes a shopping center consisting of six stores. The garden apartments are presented as two-story, brick rowhouses with Colonial Revival detailing. There are three building types distinguished by the roof form: flat, gambrel, or gable. Arlington Village was the first large-scale rental project in Arlington County and the first Federal Housing Administration-insured garden apartment development. It was listed on the National Register of Historic Places in 2008.

== Land acquisition and beginning of development ==
Arlington Village was the sixth FHA project built by Gustave Ring in 1939. It was designed by Harvey Warwick, a Washington architect who had designed Colonial Village with Ring in 1935. Ring and Warwick applied the concept of the successful Colonial Village to Arlington Village. Gustav Ring, born in Weston, West Virginia in 1910, grew up in Washington and graduated from George Washington University with a degree in engineering. In July 1939, Ring, now a successful businessman, had developed $37 million of the FHA's $100 million of rental housing insurance. For Arlington Village in 1939, Ring bought thirty-three acres of potato patch from B. M. Smith across from the Hull house for $362,000, with the rest of the fifty-three acres purchased from a number of other parties. He believed the location was key for Washington suburban expansion.

== Site design ==
The site was divided into five superblocks, with attention paid to the site's topography and a desire to retain as many natural characteristics of the area as possible. The superblocks were delineated by South Barton Street, South Cleveland Street, Sixteenth street, and Edgewood street. There were 590 paved and lined parking spaces along these streets. In the five superblocks, the designers concentrated undulating strings of 661 apartments on 12% of the space, leaving about forty-seven acres for green space, parks, recreation areas, yards, roads, parking spaces and service. The apartments were spaced around courts, the biggest being the "H" court. Each apartment had a front court and a private back court. The front court elevations were designed with Attic medallions, varying colonial door and window surrounds, porches, shutters, gambrel roofs of slate, dormers, and careful landscaping. The back court elevations are plain and have almost no details. There were 357 one-bedroom, 271 two-bedroom, and 33 three-bedroom apartments.

Ring sold the development to New England Life in 1950, at that time he had increased his original investment 666%. In 1979 Arlington Village resold for $9.7 million and is now worth twice that.

== Notable people ==
The family of Congressman Albert Gore Sr. had a Washington, DC area residence in Arlington Village. Vice President Al Gore lived in Arlington Village until he was about four years old.
