= Sunderland, Vermont =

- Town
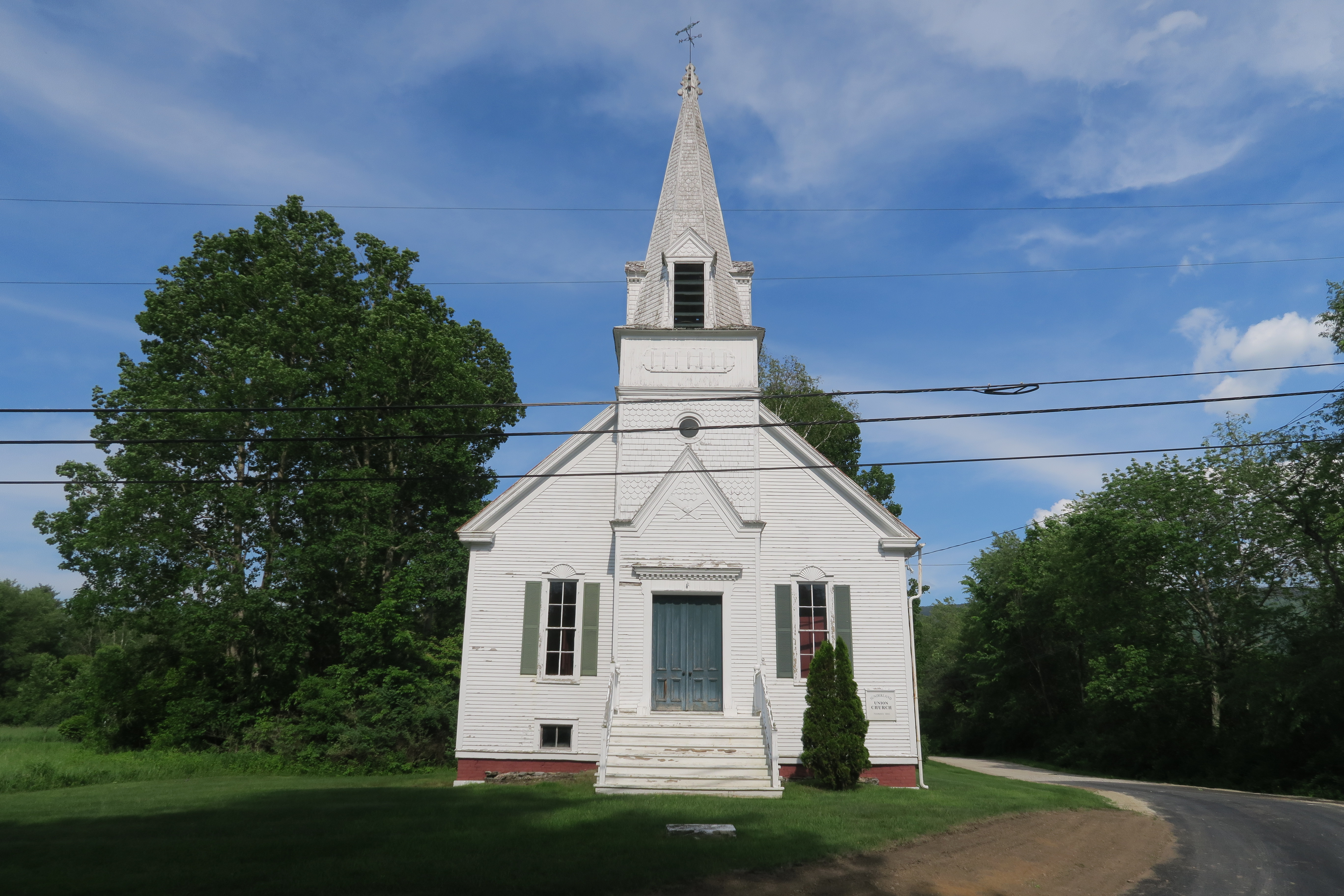
- Sunderland Union Church

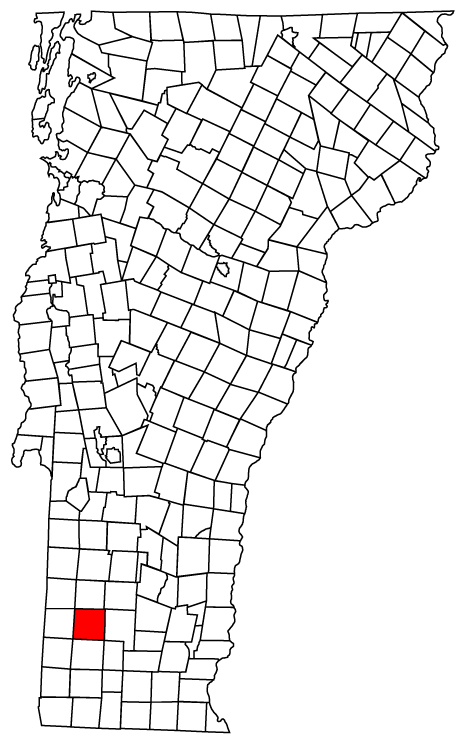
- Sunderland, Vermont
- Coordinates: 43°05′15″N 73°04′42″W
- Country: United States
- State: Vermont
- County: Bennington
- Communities: Sunderland; Chiselville; East Kansas; Kansas

Area
  - Total: 45.6 sq mi (118.2 km^{2})
  - Land: 45.3 sq mi (117.4 km^{2})
  - Water: 0.31 sq mi (0.8 km^{2})
- Elevation: 2,457 ft (749 m)

Population (2020)
  - Total: 1,056
  - Density: 23/sq mi (9/km^{2})
- Time zone: UTC-5 (Eastern (EST))
  - Summer (DST): UTC-4 (EDT)
- ZIP codes: 05252 (East Arlington); 05250 (Arlington)
- Area code: 802
- FIPS code: 50-71425
- GNIS feature ID: 1462223
- Website: www.sunderlandvt.org

Sunderland is a town in Bennington County, Vermont, United States. The population was 1,056 at the 2020 census. It is home to the mail-order company Orvis.

== Geography ==
Sunderland is located on the eastern side of Bennington County, approximately halfway between the northern and southern ends of the county. It is bordered by the town of Manchester to the north, Arlington to the west, the unincorporated town of Glastenbury to the south, and the town of Stratton in Windham County to the east.

According to the United States Census Bureau, the town has a total area of 45.6 square miles (118.2 km^{2}), of which 45.3 square miles (117.4 km^{2}) is land and 0.31 square miles (0.8 km^{2}), or 0.69%, is water. Most of the town is occupied by the plateau and western escarpment of the Green Mountains, while the Valley of Vermont occupies the western edge of the town. Most of the town drains westward to the Batten Kill, a tributary of the Hudson River, but the southeastern corner of the town drains south via the Glastenbury River to the Deerfield River, a tributary of the Connecticut River.

The western side of the town is traversed by U.S. Route 7 and Vermont Route 7A, as well as Vermont Route 313, a short connector. The Long Trail and Appalachian Trail cross the southeastern part of the town, near the crest of the Green Mountains.

== Demographics ==
Historical population
Census	Pop.	Note	%±
1790	414		—
1800	557		34.5%
1810	576		3.4%
1820	496		−13.9%
1830	463		−6.7%
1840	437		−5.6%
1850	479		9.6%
1860	567		18.4%
1870	553		−2.5%
1880	655		18.4%
1890	633		−3.4%
1900	518		−18.2%
1910	494		−4.6%
1920	409		−17.2%
1930	375		−8.3%
1940	442		17.9%
1950	493		11.5%
1960	566		14.8%
1970	601		6.2%
1980	768		27.8%
1990	872		13.5%
2000	850		−2.5%
2010	956		12.5%
2020	1,056		10.5%
U.S. Decennial Census

As of the census of 2000, there were 850 people, 350 households, and 252 families residing in the town. The population density was 18.7 people per square mile (7.2/km^{2}). There were 473 housing units at an average density of 10.4 per square mile (4.0/km^{2}). The racial makeup of the town was 98.82% White, 0.12% Black, 0.94% Asian, and 0.12% from two or more races. Hispanic of any race were 0.59% of the population.

There were 350 households, out of which 30.3% had children under the age of 18 living with them, 58.0% were married couples living together, 8.9% had a female householder with no husband present, and 28.0% were non-families. 23.1% of all households were made up of individuals, and 12.9% had someone living alone who was 65 years of age or older. The average household size was 2.43 and the average family size was 2.87.

In the town, the population was spread out, with 23.4% under the age of 18, 4.6% from 18 to 24, 27.1% from 25 to 44, 26.7% from 45 to 64, and 18.2% who were 65 years of age or older. The median age was 42 years. For every 100 females, there were 91.9 males. For every 100 females age 18 and over, there were 92.0 males.

The median income for a household in the town was $40,500, and the median income for a family was $47,500. Males had a median income of $32,250 versus $25,083 for females. The per capita income for the town was $19,453. About 6.0% of families and 9.7% of the population were below the poverty line, including 19.0% of those under age 18 and 3.6% of those age 65 or over.

== Notable people ==
- Frances "Fanny" Allen (1784–1819), first woman of New England birth to become a nun
- John W. Brownson, state congressman and senator from New York
- Jeremiah Evarts, missionary and activist; opponent of the 1830 Indian Removal Act
- Lucy Terry, African American poet and writer, resided and died in Sunderland
