= Arlington, Vermont =

- Town
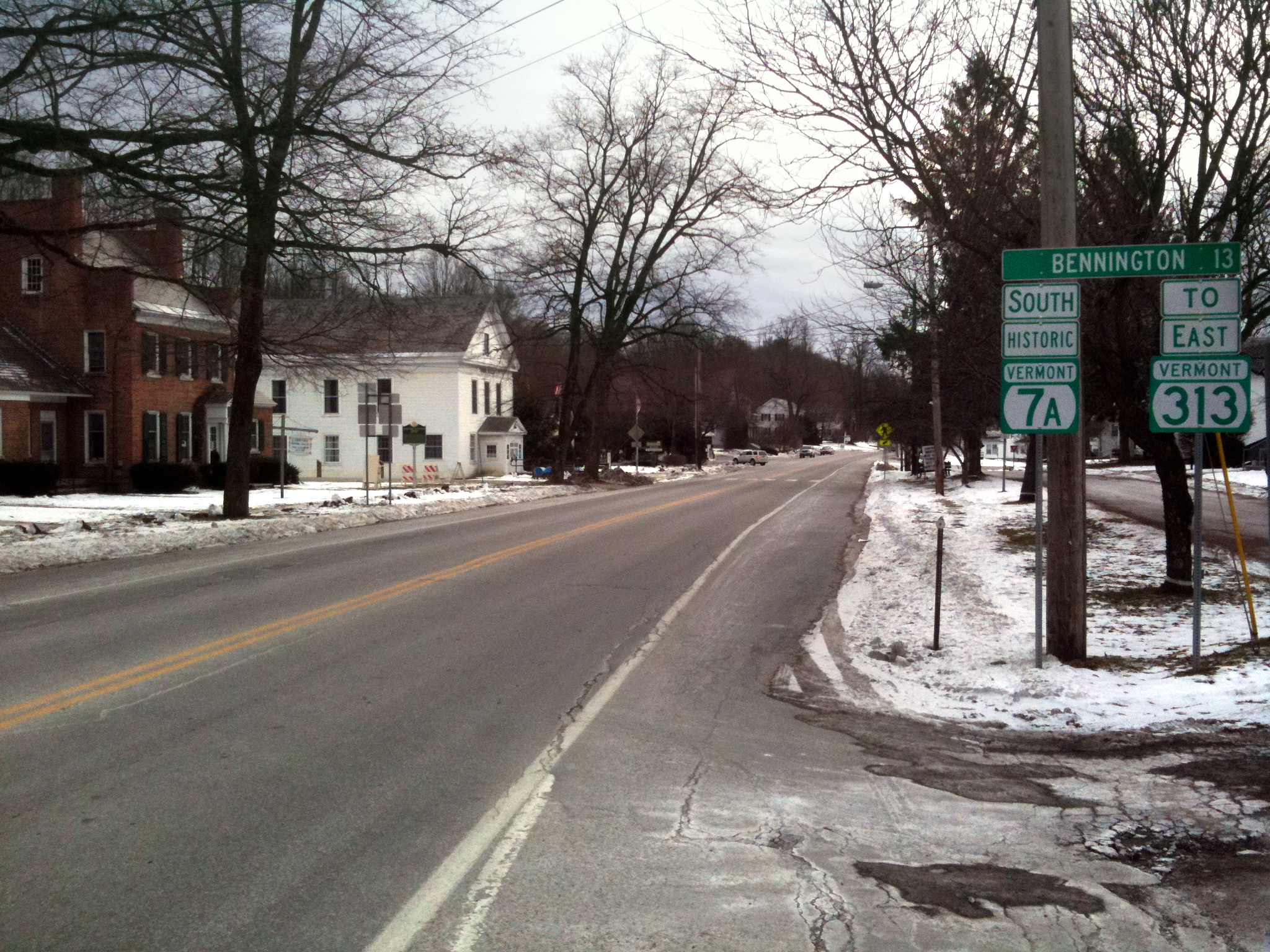
- Downtown Arlington

- Seal

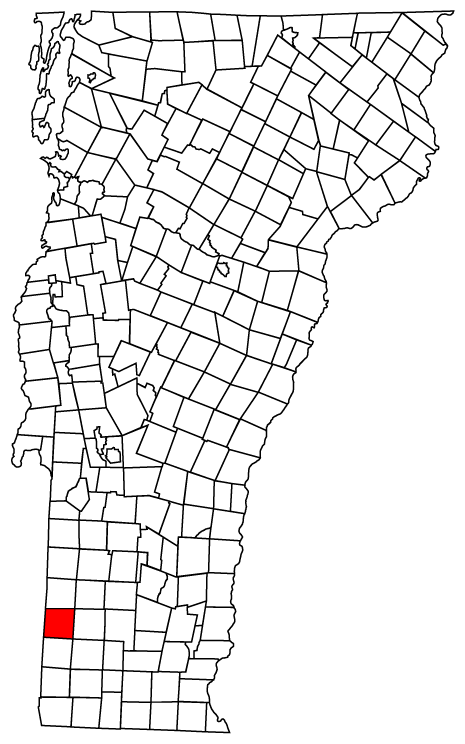
- Arlington, Vermont
- Coordinates: 43°04′26″N 73°14′10″W
- Country: United States
- State: Vermont
- County: Bennington
- Communities: Arlington; East Arlington; West Arlington

Area
  - Total: 42.4 sq mi (109.9 km^{2})
  - Land: 42.2 sq mi (109.4 km^{2})
  - Water: 0.19 sq mi (0.5 km^{2})
- Elevation: 1,237 ft (377 m)

Population (2020)
  - Total: 2,457
  - Density: 58/sq mi (22.4/km^{2})
- Time zone: UTC−5 (Eastern (EST))
  - Summer (DST): UTC−4 (EDT)
- ZIP Codes: 05250 (Arlington); 05252 (East Arlington)
- Area code: 802
- FIPS code: 50-01450
- GNIS feature ID: 1462027
- Website: www.arlingtonvt.org

Arlington is a town in Bennington County, Vermont, United States. The population was 2,457 at the 2020 census.

== History ==
The town of Arlington was chartered July 28, 1761, by New Hampshire Governor Benning Wentworth, as part of the New Hampshire Grants. In 1777, Arlington became the first capital of the Vermont Republic.

Among the first settlers in Arlington were Captain Jehiel Hawley and his family, who had settled there by 1764. They were Anglicans and had fled Roxbury, Connecticut, because of the oppressive requirements of the established Congregational church. At a Proprietor's meeting in 1764, the town voted to give 50 acres (20 hectares) of land to any man who would set up a gristmill in what is now East Arlington. This offer was accepted by Remember Baker (first cousin of Ethan Allen), who built a grist and sawmill.

In the years leading up to the American Revolution, both New York and New Hampshire laid claim to lands comprising current-day Vermont. The Province of New York began to grant land in 1765, lagging New Hampshire by four years. Arlington was, for the most part, settled by Anglicans from Roxbury, Newtown, and Milford, Connecticut, with ownership rights derived from the New Hampshire Grants.

When settlers with New York grants arrived, conflicts ensued. Among other things, the residents of Arlington relied on the militancy of Ethan Allen to discourage those touting New York grants. Ethan Allen and his group were known by their friends as the Green Mountain Boys. They were relatively effective in promoting the cause of New Hampshire grantees, although legal ownership was not settled monetarily for many years.

Several members of the Green Mountain Boys lived in Arlington before the American Revolution, including Thomas Chittenden, Seth Warner and Remember Baker, who was the first town clerk. Gideon Hard, a congressman from New York, was born in Arlington. During the American Revolutionary War, the Patriot soldiers of the Green Mountain Boys rallied against Loyalist opposition in the town. British Loyalist citizens in Arlington, united under the leadership of Dr. Samuel Adams, organized an independent military unit, Adams' Rangers, to support the British war effort in the region. In 1777, Adams' men saw action, fighting for British General John Burgoyne at the Battle of Saratoga in the Province of New York and were soundly defeated.

== Geography ==
Arlington lies in the Valley of Vermont between the Taconic Range to the west and the Green Mountains to the east, with most of Arlington's land mass lying in the Taconic Range. Five prominent peaks are located within the town: Grass Mountain, Spruce Peak, The Ball (also locally referred to as West Mountain), Red Mountain, and Big Spruce Mountain. The highest peak is Grass Mountain at elevation 3,109 ft (948 m).

According to the United States Census Bureau, the town has a total area of 42.4 square miles (109.9 km^{2}), of which 42.2 square miles (109.4 km^{2}) is land and 0.19 square miles (0.5 km^{2}), or 0.45%, is water. The Battenkill, famous for trout fishing, flows through the center of town.

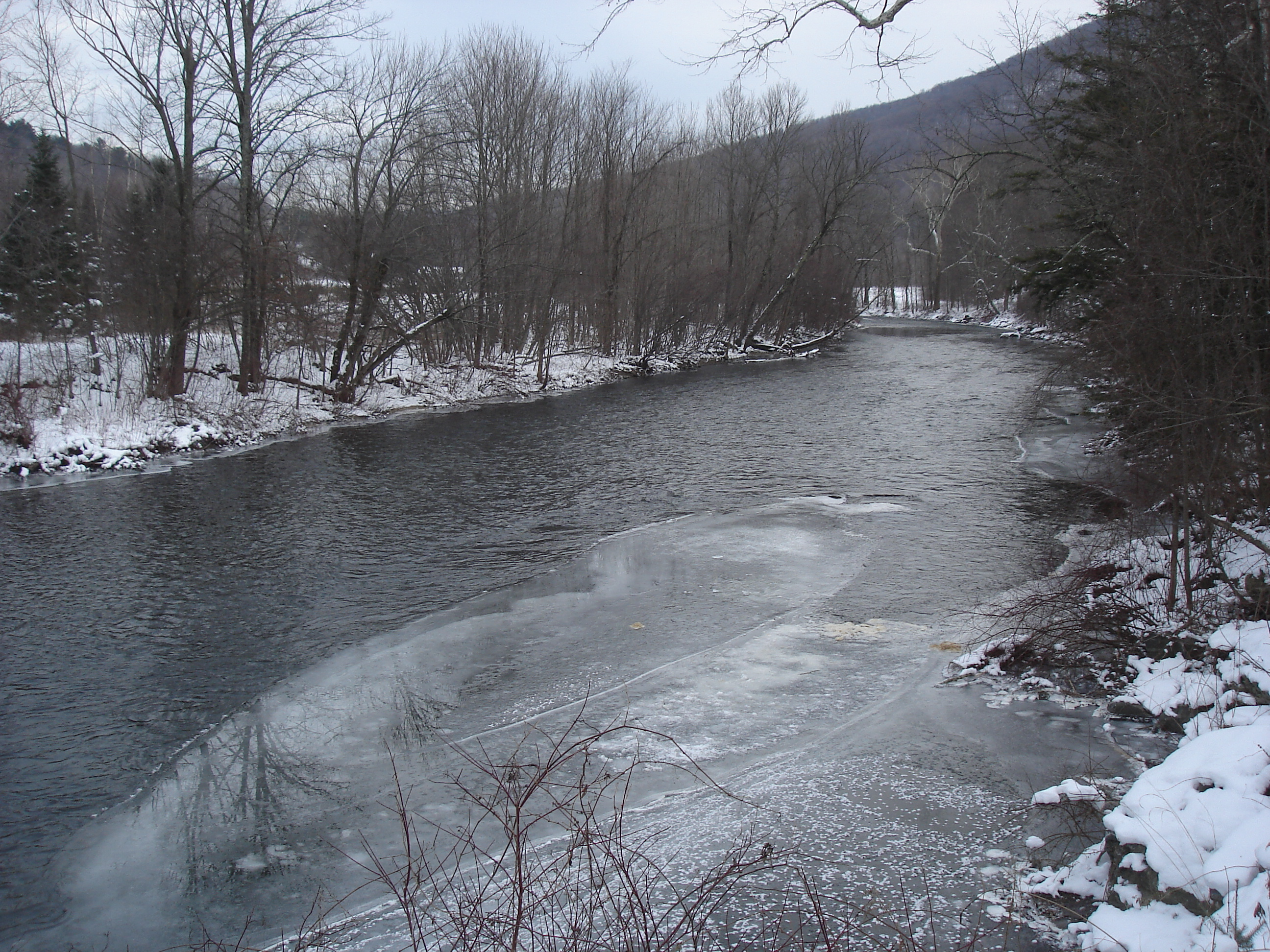
The Battenkill as it flows through West Arlington

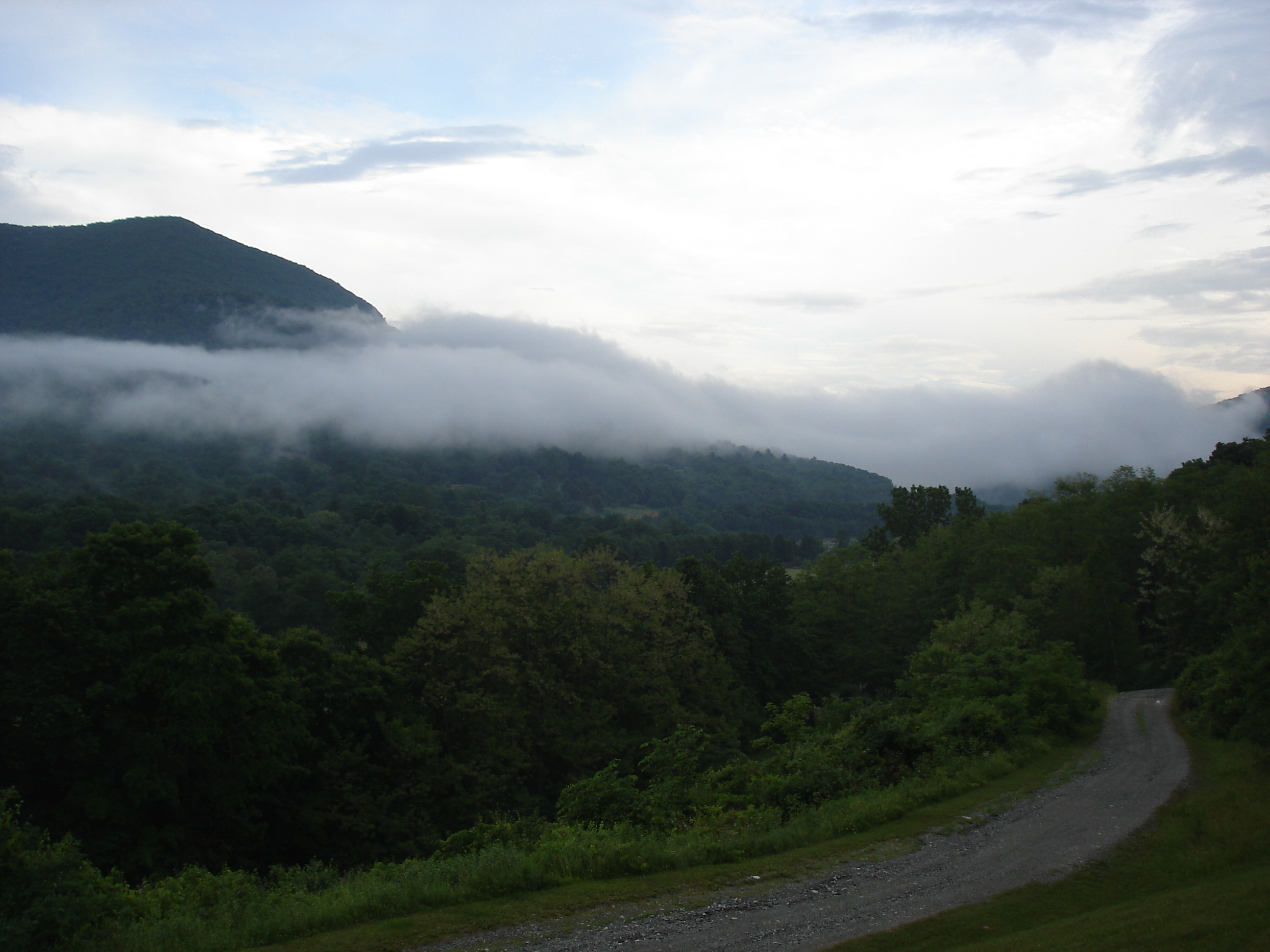
Fog over the Battenkill in West Arlington

Climate data for Arlington, Vermont
Month	Jan	Feb	Mar	Apr	May	Jun	Jul	Aug	Sep	Oct	Nov	Dec	Year
Mean daily maximum °C	−1.9	0.9	4.9	12.4	18.8	24.1	25.8	25.1	20.9	14.1	7.7	1.3	12.9
Daily mean °C	−7.2	−5.3	−1.0	5.9	11.9	16.9	19.2	18.3	13.8	7.7	2.7	−3.4	6.7
Mean daily minimum °C	−12.5	−11.6	−6.9	−0.6	5.5	9.8	12.5	11.7	6.8	1.3	−2.3	−8.2	0.5
Average precipitation mm	86.4	71.1	91.4	88.9	109.2	119.4	116.8	111.8	96.5	109.2	101.6	101.6	1,201.4
Average snowfall cm	49.8	42.2	33.0	10.4	—	—	—	—	—	1.5	10.2	43.7	190.8
Mean daily maximum °F	28.6	33.6	40.8	54.3	65.8	75.4	78.4	77.2	69.6	57.4	45.9	34.3	55.2
Daily mean °F	19.0	22.5	30.2	42.6	53.4	62.4	66.6	64.9	56.8	45.9	36.9	25.9	44.1
Mean daily minimum °F	9.5	11.1	19.6	30.9	41.9	49.6	54.5	53.1	44.2	34.3	27.9	17.2	32.9
Average precipitation inches	3.40	2.80	3.60	3.50	4.30	4.70	4.60	4.40	3.80	4.30	4.00	4.00	47.30
Average snowfall inches	19.6	16.6	13.0	4.1	—	—	—	—	—	0.6	4.0	17.2	75.1
Average precipitation days	14.7	11.2	13.5	12.6	14.3	13.3	12.6	11.8	11.0	12.3	12.9	14.7	154.9
Average snowy days	10.6	8.7	7.3	2.3	—	—	—	—	—	0.4	3.0	9.0	41.3

== Demographics ==
Historical population
Census	Pop.	Note	%±
1790	991		—
1800	1,597		61.2%
1810	1,463		−8.4%
1820	1,354		−7.5%
1830	1,207		−10.9%
1840	1,035		−14.3%
1850	1,084		4.7%
1860	1,146		5.7%
1870	1,636		42.8%
1880	1,532		−6.4%
1890	1,352		−11.7%
1900	1,193		−11.8%
1910	1,307		9.6%
1920	1,370		4.8%
1930	1,441		5.2%
1940	1,418		−1.6%
1950	1,463		3.2%
1960	1,605		9.7%
1970	1,934		20.5%
1980	2,184		12.9%
1990	2,299		5.3%
2000	2,397		4.3%
2010	2,317		−3.3%
2020	2,457		6.0%
U.S. Decennial Census

As of the census of 2000, there were 2,397 people, 1,009 households, and 676 families residing in the town. The population density was 56.5 people per square mile (21.8/km^{2}). There were 1,200 housing units at an average density of 28.3 per square mile (10.9/km^{2}). The racial makeup of the town was 98.08% White, 0.25% Black, 0.08% Native American, 0.42% Asian, 0.08% Pacific Islander, 0.21% from other races, and 0.88% from two or more races. Hispanic of any race were 0.46% of the population.

There were 1,009 households, out of which 28.5% had children under the age of 18 living with them, 56.3% were couples living together and joined in either marriage or civil union, 8.1% had a female householder with no husband present, and 33.0% were non-families. Of all households, 27.9% were made up of individuals, and 12.8% had someone living alone who was 65 years of age or older. The average household size was 2.38 and the average family size was 2.90.

In the town, the population was spread out, with 23.0% under the age of 18, 6.0% from 18 to 24, 26.2% from 25 to 44, 28.3% from 45 to 64, and 16.5% who were 65 years of age or older. The median age was 42 years. For every 100 females, there were 93.6 males. For every 100 women age 18 and over, there were 88.1 men.

The median income for a household in the town was $40,590, and the median income for a family was $49,412. Males had a median income of $31,250 versus $22,199 for females. The per capita income for the town was $23,277. About 6.4% of families and 7.2% of the population were below the poverty line, including 9.3% of those under age 18 and 7.2% of those age 65 or over.

== Education ==
Schools in Arlington include Arlington Memorial School, a high school with some 250 students.

== Economy ==
One of the largest employers for residents of Arlington is the Orvis company in neighboring Sunderland.

Mack Moulding is the largest employer in Arlington by far. Orvis has its offices in Sunderland and a retail outlet in Manchester Center.

== Notable people ==
- Samuel Adams, early Vermont settler and British Loyalist
- Remember Baker, early Vermont settler and Green Mountain Boy
- Holly Bakke, Former New Jersey Commissioner of Banking and Insurance
- Alec Baldwin, Actor (secondary residence)
- Thomas Chittenden, first governor of Vermont and first and third governor of the Vermont Republic
- Martin Chester Deming, businessman and member of the Vermont House of Representatives
- Chick Evans, baseball player
- Dorothy Canfield Fisher, educator; credited with bringing the Montessori method to the US
- Michael J. Fox lived in Arlington, also, was married in Arlington
- Gideon Hard, former U.S. Congressman
- Norman Rockwell, painter and illustrator; lived in Arlington
- Carl Ruggles, composer and painter
- Mead Schaeffer, painter and illustrator for major magazines
- Don Trachte, cartoonist known for his work on the comic strip Henry
- Seth Warner, early Vermont settler and Green Mountain Boy

== See also ==
- Charterhouse of the Transfiguration
- Kelly Stand Road
