= Arlington Memorial School =

Arlington Memorial High School

Location
- 529 East Arlington Rd; Arlington, VT 05250; 43.065604°N 73.151264°W

Information
- Type: Secondary school
- Established: 1941
- Principal: Sarah Merrill
- Grades: 6-12
- Enrollment: 220
- Affiliation: New England Association of Schools and Colleges
- Athletic Conference: Marble Valley League C & D
- Website: Official website

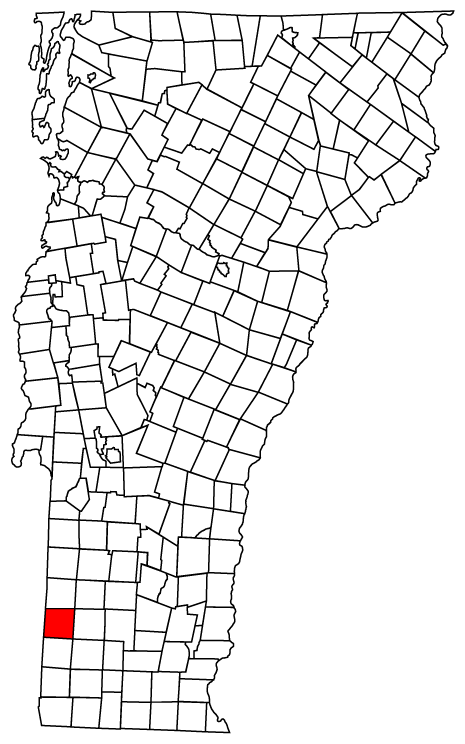
Arlington, Vermont

Arlington Memorial High School is a rural high school (grades 6–12) in Arlington, Bennington County, Vermont and part of the Arlington School District. In 2018, it had about 220 students and a faculty of 35 teachers.

In 2018, Arlington Memorial School received the honor of 2nd Highest Academic Achieving High School in Vermont by U.S. News & World Report. This gave the high school a silver medal. In 2017, Arlington Memorial School was named a “Best High School in America” by U.S. News & World Report. This also gave the shigh school a silver medal.

The new Mack Performing Arts Center and Wes Carlson Studio for Dance and Theater is used by students and community members alike. Its 140-seat theatre, courtyard, and stage provide the venue for a variety of events.

== History ==
In 1921, Arlington Memorial School was constructed. In 1922, students were then moved into the new Town high school. This was the first high school of the Town of Arlington, rather than the individual districts of Arlington. An 1892 legislation act of the Vermont Legislature required towns to address the means of education, rather than the districts of each town. The school was named in memorial to all of the Arlington Veterans of every war. Before Arlington Memorial school was constructed, students from each district school would have to take the train to North Bennington or Manchester in order to attend upper-level classes.

=== Arlington Memorial School fire ===
On November 9, 1940, Arlington Memorial school burned down. The town was quick to assemble and addressed the disaster in two stages. The first stage was the short term, students would meet in family homes in order to graduate on time. While the second, long-term goal, was to build a new building on top of the old one. The old building was starting to get overcrowded and the fire could be considered a blessing and a curse.

== Arlington athletics ==
Arlington Memorial High School competes in the Marble Valley League Class D Division. They are also a Division 4 Vermont High School. The Boys Soccer Team currently competes in a Marble Valley League Class C schedule due to the dominance of the Class D league in past years. The Boys Overall record in 2017 was 8–5–1 as of April 4, 2018. They lost in the Quarter-Finals in 2017 to South Royalton of the Central Vermont League. The Girls Soccer team recently just won the Division 4 Vermont State Title. The Girls overall record in the 2017 season was 14–0 not including the playoff games. With the playoff games, the girls are 18–0, making a perfect, undefeated season. To the surprise of many, Arlington also has a relatively successful baseball team. In the 2021 season, the Varsity boys team posted a record of 11-2 in the regular season, winning the Marble Valley League. After winning a quarterfinal game against Rivendell Academy, they were eliminated from playoff contention in the semifinal round by Blue Mountain Union High School, finishing with a 12-3 overall record.

== Arlington Athletics State Championships ==
=== Baseball State Championships ===
- 1989 Baseball Champions
- 1990 Baseball Champions
- 1995 Baseball Champions

=== Basketball State Championships ===
- 1971 Boys Basketball Champions
- 1983 Boys Basketball Champions
- 1984 Boys Basketball Champions
- 1985 Boys Basketball Champions
- 1989 Boys Basketball Champions
- 1990 Girls Basketball Champions
- 1991 Girls Basketball Champions
- 1991 Boys Basketball Champions
- 1992 Boys Basketball Champions
- 1993 Girls Basketball Champions
- 1998 Girls Basketball Champions
- 1998 Boys Basketball Champions
- 2000 Girls Basketball Champions
- 2001 Girls Basketball Champions
- 2003 Girls Basketball Champions
- 2003 Boys Basketball Champions
- 2004 Girls Basketball Champions
- 2005 Girls Basketball Champions

=== Soccer State Championships ===
- 1982 Boys Soccer Champions
- 1984 Boys Soccer Champions
- 1985 Boys Soccer Champions
- 1986 Boys Soccer Champions
- 1989 Girls Soccer Champions
- 1989 Boys Soccer Champions
- 1990 Girls Soccer Champions
- 1990 Boys Soccer Champions
- 1991 Girls Soccer Champions
- 1992 Girls Soccer Champions
- 1995 Boys Soccer Champions
- 2002 Girls Soccer Champions
- 2009 Girls Soccer Champions
- 2017 Girls Soccer Champions
- 2018 Girls Soccer Champions
- 2018 Boys Soccer Champions
- 2023 Girls Soccer Champions

=== Softball State Championships ===
- 1983 Softball Champions
- 1984 Softball Champions
- 1985 Softball Champions
- 1986 Softball Champions
- 1987 Softball Champions
- 1989 Softball Champions
- 1990 Softball Champions
- 1993 Softball Champions
- 1999 Softball Champions
- 2001 Softball Champions

== School awards ==
- 2007 - Named a “Best High School in America” by U.S. News & World Report (silver medal)
- 2008 - Named a “Best High School in America” by U.S. News & World Report (bronze medal)
- 2009 - AP Scores Above State & National Average
- 2009 - 5th Highest State Scores for NECAP Science
- 2009 - 3rd Highest State Scores for NECAP Reading & Writing
- 2009 - Named a "Top School" by The Johns Hopkins University
- 2010 - 3rd Highest Academic Achieving High School in Vermont
- 2013 - Named a “Best High School in America” by U.S. News & World Report (silver medal)
- 2016 - 4th Highest Academic Achieving High School in Vermont
- 2016 - Named a “Best High School in America” by U.S. News & World Report (silver medal)
- 2017 - Named a “Best High School in America” by U.S. News & World Report (silver medal)
- 2017 - 2nd Highest Academic Achieving High School in Vermont by U.S. News & World Report (silver medal)
