= Old Bennington, Vermont =

- Village
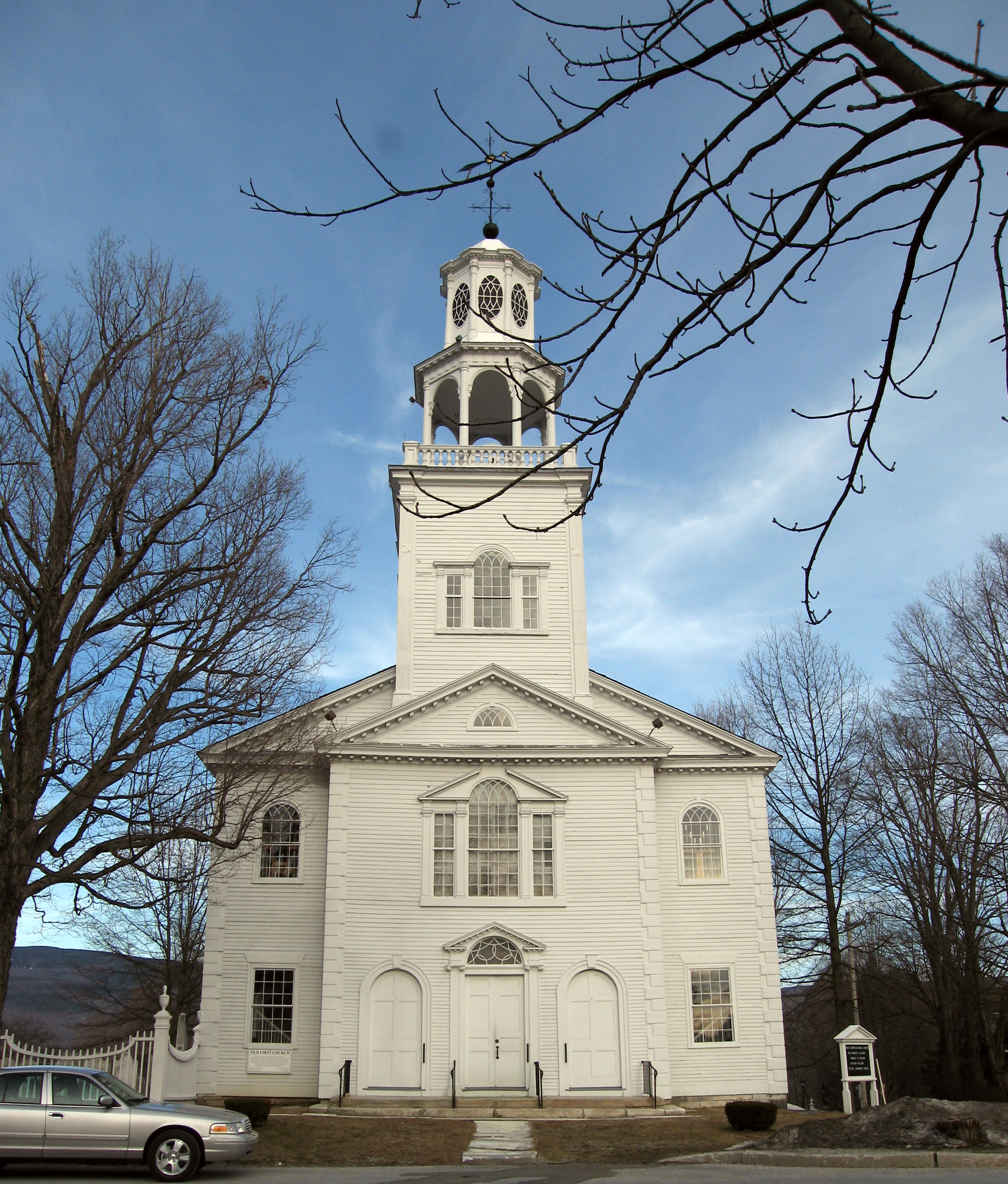
- The Congregational Church in Old Bennington

- Location within the state of Vermont
- Coordinates: 42°53′05″N 73°12′51″W
- Country: United States
- State: Vermont
- County: Bennington

Area
  - Total: 0.37 sq mi (0.95 km^{2})
  - Land: 0.37 sq mi (0.95 km^{2})
  - Water: 0 sq mi (0.00 km^{2})
- Elevation: 801 ft (244 m)

Population (2020)
  - Total: 156
  - Density: 430/sq mi (160/km^{2})
- Time zone: UTC-5 (Eastern (EST))
  - Summer (DST): UTC-4 (EDT)
- ZIP Code: 05201 (Bennington)
- Area code: 802
- FIPS code: 50-53125
- GNIS feature ID: 2378323
- Website: https://oldbennington.org/

Old Bennington is a village in Bennington County, Vermont, United States. It is located entirely within the town of Bennington. As of the 2020 census, the village had a population of 156.

The village and its surrounding area were added to the National Register of Historic Places in 1984 as Old Bennington Historic District. It is roughly bounded by the former Rutland railroad bed, Monument Avenue, West Road, Seminary Lane, Elm Street, and Fairview Street. The district is noted for its well-preserved Revolutionary War-era homes, and is significant as one of the earliest settlements in Vermont. The centerpieces of the district are the Old First Church (built in 1806 and restored in 1937) and the Bennington Battle Monument.

== Geography ==
Old Bennington is located near the geographic center of the town of Bennington, on a hill overlooking downtown Bennington, which lies to the east. Vermont Route 9 passes through the village, leading east into downtown Bennington and west to the New York state line.

According to the United States Census Bureau, the village has a total area of 0.37 square miles (0.95 km^{2}), all land.

== Demographics ==
Historical population
Census	Pop.	Note	%±
1900	215		—
1910	42		−80.5%
1920	152		261.9%
1930	174		14.5%
1940	169		−2.9%
1950	198		17.2%
1960	205		3.5%
1970	268		30.7%
1980	353		31.7%
1990	279		−21.0%
2000	232		−16.8%
2010	139		−40.1%
2020	156		12.2%
U.S. Decennial Census

As of the census of 2000, there were 232 people, 101 households, and 62 families residing in the village. The population density was 533.6 people per square mile (208.3/km^{2}). There were 118 housing units at an average density of 271.4/sq mi (106.0/km^{2}). The racial makeup of the village was 93.10% White, 3.88% African American, 0.86% Asian, and 2.16% from two or more races. Hispanic or Latino of any race were 2.59% of the population.

There were 101 households, out of which 27.7% had children under the age of 18 living with them, 58.4% were married couples living together, 1.0% had a female householder with no husband present, and 38.6% were non-families. 28.7% of all households were made up of individuals, and 19.8% had someone living alone who was 65 years of age or older. The average household size was 2.30 and the average family size was 2.89.

In the village, the age distribution of the population shows 23.3% under the age of 18, 4.7% from 18 to 24, 17.7% from 25 to 44, 29.3% from 45 to 64, and 25.0% who were 65 years of age or older. The median age was 48 years. For every 100 females, there were 88.6 males. For every 100 females age 18 and over, there were 83.5 males.

The median income for a household in the village was $67,500, and the median income for a family was $85,776. Males had a median income of $66,250 versus $48,750 for females. The per capita income for the village was $40,884. About 3.6% of families and 4.3% of the population were below the poverty line, including 4.3% of those under the age of eighteen and 4.4% of those 65 or over.

== Notable people ==
- William Ellery Channing, a leading Unitarian theologian; died in Old Bennington
- Robert Frost, poet
- Esther Morgan McCullough, author and musician, is buried at Old Bennington Cemetery
- Brevet Lieutenant Colonel Martin Scott, U.S. Army officer who was killed in action in the Mexican–American War
