= Catamount Tavern =

Tavern in Old Bennington, Vermont, United States

Coordinates: 42.885894°N 73.21368°W

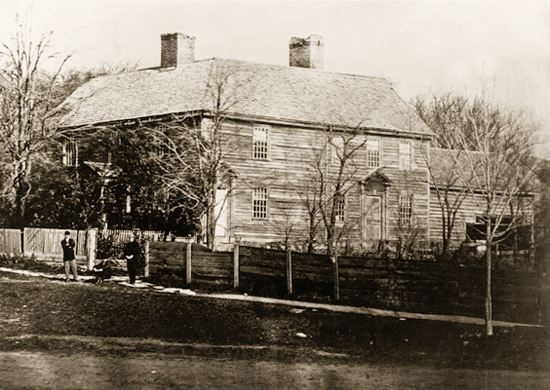
- The Catamount Tavern in a late 19th-century photograph

General information
- Town or city: Old Bennington, Vermont
- Country: United States
- Completed: 1769

The Catamount Tavern was a tavern in Old Bennington, Vermont, United States. Originally known as Fay's House, it is marked now by a granite and copper statue placed in 1896. It was built 1769 and burned in 1871. During the tavern's 102 years of existence, it was the site of many important events in Vermont's colonial and revolutionary history.

It was, for instance, the site of the public hanging of New York grantee and Queen's Rangers member David Redding. Arrested for horse-theft, he managed to escape while being transported to Albany, New York. But he was re-arrested very soon and taken to Bennington, where, after a trial in the tavern, he was sentenced to be hanged in a field adjacent to the tavern. A local merchant, John Burnham, delayed the execution by pointing out that Redding had been tried by six rather than twelve men. Colonel Ethan Allen advised the crowd depart to return the day fixed for the execution in the act of the governor and council, adding with an oath, and according to Dr. John Spargo who wrote a book on the hanging which can be found in the Bennington Museum library, "you shall see somebody hung, for if Redding is not hung, I will be hung myself." Upon this assurance, the uproar ceased and the crowd dispersed. Redding was sentenced to hang on June 11, 1778 and his bones, after many years of being used for research and being kept in a drawer, were laid to rest 200 years later in the Old First Church Cemetery.

The name Catamount Tavern came about when Settlers from Bennington Vermont posted a stuffed catamount on the tavern's signpost to repel the New Yorkers who claimed their land. The Catamount served as headquarters for the Green Mountain Boys while making their plans against the New Yorkers and the British. Ethan Allen planned the capture of Fort Ticonderoga here; John Stark planned British General Burgoyne's defeat here, eventually leading to the Battle of Bennington. The Catamount was also the meeting place of Vermont's only form of government then, in 1775, the Vermont Council of Safety.

== Bibliography ==
- (1892). Appletons' Annual Cyclopædia and Register of Important Events of the Year. New York: Appleton.
- Holbrook, Stewart (1940). Ethan Allen. New York: Macmillan.
- Perry, A. H. (1891). Scotch-Irish in New England. Boston: Cushing.
- Wilbur, LaFayette (1899). Early History of Vermont. Jericho, Vt: Roscoe.
