= East Arlington Village Historic District =

Historic district in Vermont, United States

- U.S. National Register of Historic Places
- U.S. Historic district
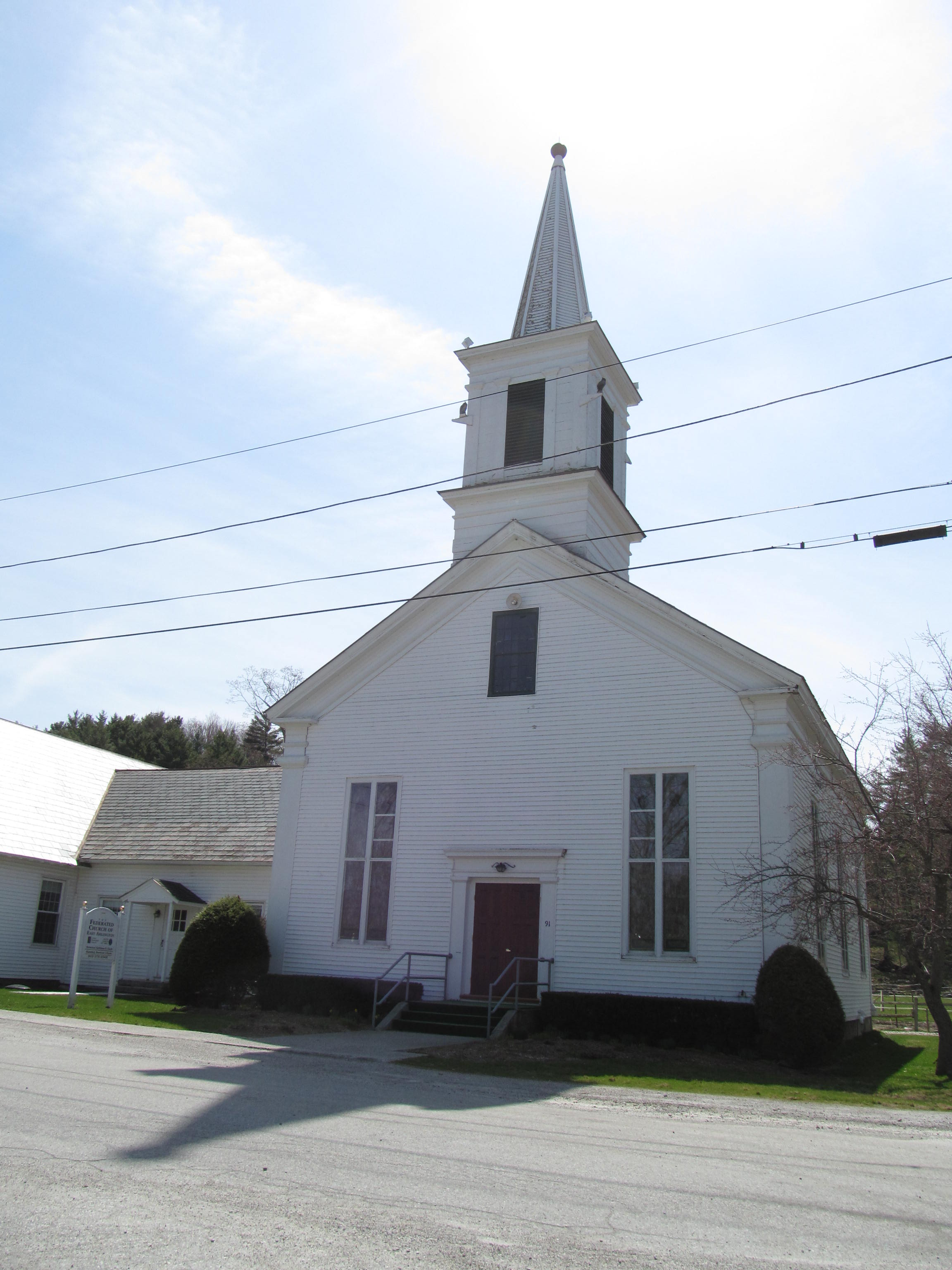

- Location within Vermont Location within the United States
- Location: Roughly bounded by Old Mill, Ice Pond, E. Arlington, and Warm Brook Rds., Maple and Pleasnt Sts., and the Lane, Arlington and Sunderland, Vermont
- Coordinates: 43°3′42″N 73°8′40″W
- Area: 140 acres (57 ha)
- Built: 1778
- Built by: Multiple, including James W. Tynan
- Architectural style: Colonial Revival, Queen Anne, Greek Revival
- NRHP reference No.: 96000689
- Added to NRHP: July 5, 1996

The East Arlington Village Historic District encompasses the historic core of a 19th-century village in Arlington and Sunderland, Vermont, United States. It is centered on Old Mill Road, and developed as a mill village beginning in the 18th century. It was listed on the National Register of Historic Places in 1996.

== Description and history ==
East Arlington is located in central eastern Arlington, a town on Vermont's western border with New York, and overlaps slightly into neighboring Sunderland. It is north of Vermont Route 313 and west of United States Route 7, the major north–south route through western Vermont. The village was settled in the 1760s, and is one of the earliest colonial settlements in the state. Settlers were drawn by the water power provided by Peter's Branch and Warm Brook, which powered the area's industries into the early 20th century. The village was bypassed by the railroad (which runs to the west, by Arlington's central village), and its water power was relatively modest, leading to a decline in industrial activity. In the early 20th century, the Hale Company expanded operations, despite these limitations; portions of its mill complex still survive.

The historic district is organized around the village's major roadways, which are East Arlington Street and Ice Pond Road, running roughly east–west, and Warm Brook Road and Old Mill Road, which run generally north–south, with a further extension along Kansas Road into Sunderland to the east. Most of the buildings in the district are Greek Revival in style, an indication of the village's most significant period of growth (in the second quarter of the 19th century), although earlier Federal and later Italianate and Queen Anne styles are also represented. Most of these are vernacular in expression, and a number of buildings have been at least partly compromised by the application of 20th-century siding. There is no central common or open green space, a typical feature of many New England villages, and there is only one church, the 1845-48 Greek Revival Congregational Church.

== See also ==
- National Register of Historic Places listings in Bennington County, Vermont
