= Brookline-Newfane Bridge =

- Bridge 19
- U.S. National Register of Historic Places
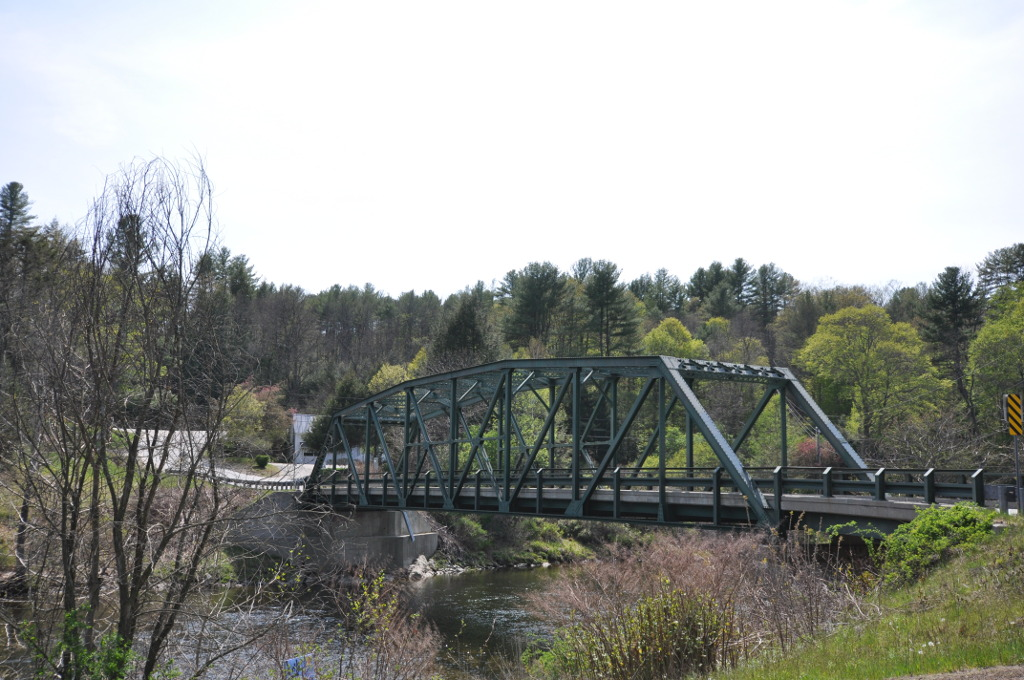

- Location within Vermont Location within the United States
- Location: Grassy Brook Rd., Brookline, Vermont
- Coordinates: 42°59′50″N 72°38′16″W
- Area: less than one acre
- Built: 1928
- Architectural style: Camelback through truss
- MPS: Metal Truss, Masonry, and Concrete Bridges in Vermont MPS
- NRHP reference No.: 07001025
- Added to NRHP: September 28, 2007

The Brookline-Newfane Bridge is a historic bridge spanning the West River between Brookline and Newfane, Vermont on Grassy Brook Road. It is a camelback through truss bridge, built in 1928 by the Berlin Construction Company in the wake of Vermont's devastating 1927 floods. The bridge was listed on the National Register of Historic Places in 2007 as Bridge 19, at which time it was one of seven surviving camelback bridges in the state. It last underwent a major rehabilitation in 2003–4.

== Description and history ==
The Brookline-Newfane Bridge is located on the West River, which forms the town line between northeastern Newfane and southwestern Brookline. The road it carries is called Grassy Brook Road (or Town Highway 1) in Brookline and Radway Hill Road (Town Highway 4) in Newfane. The bridge, which is owned jointly by the two towns, is the principal means of access to Brookline from the south, and Grassy Brook Road is the town's principal thoroughfare. It is a camelback through truss iron structure, with a main span of 160 feet (49 m) and a total width of 20 feet 9 inches (6.32 m). A steel I-beamed approach span of 30 feet (9.1 m) provides access to the bridge on the Brookline side.

A bridge has probably stood on this site as early as 1782, when the road linking the two towns was surveyed. It is not known how many bridges have stood there; the bridge destroyed by the 1927 flooding was a Town lattice truss bridge. Following that flooding, temporary bridges were hastily assembled at this site; they were washed away during thaw floods in January 1928. The present bridge was built in spring 1928. The Berlin Construction Company, who built it, was in some ways a successor to the Berlin Iron Bridge Company, having been formed by employees of that company after its acquisition by the American Bridge Company. The bridge was built on older abutments, raising them to a point 2 inches (5.1 cm) below the 1927 flood's high water mark.

== See also ==
- National Register of Historic Places listings in Windham County, Vermont
- List of bridges on the National Register of Historic Places in Vermont
