= List of non-authentic covered bridges in Vermont =

The State of Vermont has the highest number of covered bridges per square mile in the United States. Replica covered bridges have also been built throughout the state to capture the essence of the historic bridges. Non-authentic covered bridges are those that do not use traditional truss construction. Usually they are built with stringer construction. This list is bound to be incomplete as "backyard bridges", as most of these can be, are not publicized.

== Bridge access by the public ==
The "access" column indicates whether the bridge is publicly accessible or not.

- Public bridges: There are some bridges in this list that are truly public... bridges at parks, etc. Other bridges that are technically privately owned, but on property generally open to the public (condominium projects, hotels, stores, etc.) are also listed as "public". It can be assumed that easy access to these bridges without trespassing is possible.
- Private bridges: Bridges that are definitely privately owned and not open to the public are marked as "private", despite whether or not visitors are welcomed. In the case of these bridges, it is noted (when known) whether they can be seen or accessed from public land (a road) without trespassing.

== GPS coordinates ==
Longitude and latitude coordinates are given when confirmed either by personal observation or satellite imagery.

== The list ==
Name	County	Location	Built	Length (ft)	Crosses	Access	Coordinates	Photo	Notes
Hemingway	Addison	Granville	1973	20'	unknown stream	Private			
Casey	Addison	Starksboro	1991	16'	Baldwin Brook	Private			
Gilley	Addison	Starksboro	1991	12'	unknown brook	Private			
Little Otter Creek	Addison	Ferrisburgh	1973	16'	Little Otter Creek	Private	44°10′46.2″N 73°11′43.8″W		
Heath	Addison	Waltham	?	11'	pond outlet	Private	44°08′35″N 73°13′20″W		
Kreffer Crossing	Bennington	Sandgate	1976	39'	Green River on Sandgate Road	Private			
Grace Christian School	Bennington	Bennington	1979	30'	Furnace Brook	Public	42°53′42″N 73°11′54″W		
Armstrong	Bennington	Bennington	1985	40'	Jewett Brook	Private			
Gregory	Bennington	Manchester	?	30'	Unknown brook	Private			
Bennington Covered Bridge Museum	Bennington	Bennington	2003	?	on dry land	Public			This bridge may be authentic since it is at a covered bridge museum. Confirmation needed.
Bondville Fair	Bennington	Winhall	2004	24'	on dry land	Public			This "bridge" uses Town lattice construction, but it has no floor, so is it really a bridge?
Jeudevine Falls	Caledonia	Hardwick	2001	24'	brook	Private	44.548796°N 72.371911°W		
Joe's Pond	Caledonia	West Danville	1977	37'	outlet of Joe's Pond	Public	44°24′30″N 72°11′42″W		
Riverside Park	Chittenden	Jericho	1972	37'	Browns River	Public	44°30′59″N 72°56′48″W		
LaRue	Chittenden	Underhill	1982	40'	Browns River	Private	44°31′01″N 72°55′38″W		
Circus Building	Chittenden	Shelburne	?	21'	on a path	Public			at Shelburne Museum, paid admission required
Potbin	Chittenden	Underhill	?	8'	pond outlet	Private			
P&S Country Furniture Barn	Essex	Concord	c1980	18'	pond outlet	Public	44°26′40″N 71°55′04″W		
Jackson	Essex	Lemington	c1970	16'	Jones Brook	Private			
Nelson	Essex	Lunenburg	1990	16'	unknown brook	Private			
Beebe	Franklin	St. Albans	1968	17'	pond outlet	Private	44°47′36″N 73°02′43″W		can be seen from the road
Mediaway	Franklin	Montgomery	1981	25'	unknown brook	Public(?)	44°53′07″N 72°32′23″W		Looks to be at a place of business, visible from the road
Sylvester	Franklin	Montgomery	2000	14'	pond outlet	Private	44.881497°N 72.658795°W		Fairly close to road
Blondin	Franklin	Montgomery	1996	24'	pond outlet	Private	44°52′28″N 72°39′29″W		Might be able to photograph from the road with a long telephoto lens
Homestead	Franklin	Franklin	1993	17'	unknown brook	Private			
Pont De Columb Un	Franklin	Franklin	2001	16'	unknown brook	Private	44°59′57″N 72°56′22″W		Not sure which of these two bridges is "Un" and which is "Deux"
Pont De Columb Deux	Franklin	Franklin	2001	16'	unknown brook	Private	44°59′56″N 72°56′21″W		Both can be seen from the road on the same property
Granger	Franklin	Franklin	1972	16'	unknown brook	Private			
Pattees	Franklin	Enosburg	1979	22'	unknown brook	Private	44°51′53.1″N 72°45′44.5″W		May be able to photograph from the road with a long telephoto lens
Edward's	Lamoille	Belvidere	?	?	brook	Private	44.737185°N 72.735929°W		
White Caps	Lamoille	Stowe	1970	56'	West Branch of Waterbury River on Brook Road	Public	44.497104°N 72.745314°W		Entrance to residential area. Concrete deck, but authentic Howe trusses supporting dead load.
Sidewalk	Lamoille	Stowe	1973	150'	Waterbury River on Vermont Route 108	Public	44°27′59″N 72°41′17″W		
unknown	Lamoille	Stowe	?	?	unknown brook	Private	44.483134°N 72.663622°W		
Mountain Road Motel	Lamoille	Stowe	1975	15'	unknown brook	Public	44.473172°N 72.698845°W		
Morse Mill	Lamoille	Cambridge	1988	45'	Brewster River	Private	44°35′18.3″N 72°47′28.8″W		Can be seen from road
Lynch & Burt	Lamoille	Waterville	1992	12'	unknown brook on Village Green	Public	44°41′22.5″N 72°46′8.1″W		
Adair	Lamoille	Waterville	1987	17'	pond inlet	Private			
Gentle Giants Sleigh & Carriage Rides	Lamoille	Stowe	?	?	swampy area	Public	44.49314°N 72.741366°W		
Golden Eagle Resort #1	Lamoille	Stowe	?	8'	unknown brook	Public			
Golden Eagle Resort #2	Lamoille	Stowe	1999	12'	unknown brook	Public			
Weltman	Lamoille	Morristown	1972	32'	Sterling Brook	Private			
Faith	Lamoille	Waterville	1998	10'	pond outlet	Private	44°41′11″N 72°46′10″W		can be seen from the road
Kneeland Beauty Salon	Lamoille	Hyde Park	?	10'	Unknown brook	Public			
Braley	Orange	Tunbridge	1990	20'	artificial pond	Private	43°55′19″N 72°24′31″W		may be able to photograph with long telephoto lens not to be confused with the Braley Covered Bridge
Roystan	Orange	Newbury	1996	21'	unnamed brook	Private			
unknown	Orange	Newbury	?	?	unnamed brook	Private	44.092228°N 72.093074°W		
Driscoll	Orange	Fairlee	?	8'	pond	Private			
English Rose Inn	Orleans	Westfield	1973	14'	pond outlet	Public	44°53′16.5″N 72°32′8.6″W		
Auger Sugarmill	Orleans	Barton	1988	40'	Barton River	Private	44°43′43″N 72°11′11″W		on private road, but may be able to access
St. Onge	Orleans	Lowell	1988	32'	ditch	Private			
Quesnell	Orleans	Lowell	1999	8'	ditch	Private	44°46′25″N 72°27′25.4″W		easily seen on side of road
Neshobe Golf Club	Rutland	Brandon	1986	39'	Neshobe River	Public	43°48′39.5″N 73°04′28″W		can be seen from road, might be able walk onto course to get closer?
Borrelli	Rutland	Mount Holly	?	16'	pond	Private			
Pat Bailey	Rutland	Pittsford	2014	?	pond	Public			At New England Maple Museum
Getzinger	Washington	Moretown	?	?	unknown brook	Private	44.222345°N 72.710795°W		
Battleground	Washington	Fayston	1974	51'	Mill Brook	Public	44°12′03″N 72°53′42″W		entry to condominium complex
Chamberlin	Washington	Northfield	1956	19'	tributary of Stony Brook	Private	44°08′55″N 72°43′05.5″W		easily seen close to road Not to be confused with Chamberlin Covered Bridge
Best Western	Washington	Waterbury	1962	50'	mountain stream	Public	44°20′43″N 72°44′59.2″W		
Floyd Fitch #1	Washington	Calais	1962	10'	Pekin Brook	Private			
Floyd Fitch #2	Washington	Calais	1984	12'	Pekin Brook	Private			
Rea	Washington	Calais	1992	13'	ditch	Private			
Santa's Sweetheart	Windham	Putney	1957	29'	unnamed brook	Public			At Santa's Land theme park.
Santa's Land Railroad	Windham	Putney	1962	18'	unnamed brook	Public			At Santa's Land theme park.
Santa's Land Swan	Windham	Putney	1990	19'	unnamed brook	Public			At Santa's Land theme park.
Covered Bridge Lodge	Windham	Dover	1964	38'	Blue Brook	Private			Can be seen from the road
Grafton Cheese Factory	Windham	Grafton	1967	62'	South Branch Saxtons River	Public	43°09′59″N 72°36′47″W		
Great American Recreation Cafe	Windham	Wilmington	1977	34'	Bill Brook	Public	42°54′32″N 72°50′50″W		
Island Properties	Windham	Jamaica	1989	62'	West River	Private?	43°05′23.5″N 72°46′05.5″W		Was the entrance to an apparently abandoned condominium project... may be private drive now??
John Tyler Sherwin	Windham	Brattleboro	1988	16'	drainage ditch	Public			At Living Memorial Park
Dummerston School	Windham	Dummerston	1994	12'	ditch	Public			
Chase	Windham	Brattleboro	1962	16'	unknown brook	Private			
Snow	Windham	Stratton	1998	62'	ski trail	Public	43°06′40″N 72°55′00″W		Entrance to condominium development
Hermitage Road	Windham	Dover	2009	50'	Cold Brook	Public	42°55′42″N 72°53′20″W		
Kindle Farm School	Windham	Townshend	2006	17'	ditch	Public	43°01′11″N 72°39′27.5″W		
Noway Farm	Windsor	Barnard	1981	13'	Gulf Stream	Private			
Seven Cedars Farm	Windsor	Barnard	1985	24'	Pond Brook	Private	43°45′14″N 72°37′58″W		
Quechee	Windsor	Hartford	1970	85'	Ottauquechee River on Waterman Hill Road	Public	43.645427°N 72.419059°W		Steel stringer construction. Rebuilt in 2013 after damage caused by Hurricane Irene.
Mill Brook	Windsor	Reading	2009	59'	Mill Brook	Private	43.48243°N 72.551485°W		
Green Mountain Horse Association	Windsor	Woodstock	1998	6'	dry land	Public			

=== Destroyed by Hurricane Irene ===
The following bridges were destroyed by Hurricane Irene on August 28, 2011 and removed from this list:

- Giorgetti Covered Bridge formerly in Pittsfield
- Toll Covered Bridge formerly in Dover
- Pickle Barrel Covered Bridge formerly in Sherburne
- Spring Hill Farm Covered Bridge formerly in Barnard
- Seven Cedars Farm formerly in Barnard (Visited by Dan Brock )

The Giorgetti and Pickle Barrel covered bridges were not destroyed by Hurricane Irene. They still stand today. Source is my visiting these sites after Hurricane Irene. By Dan Brock

=== Other losses ===
- The Hayes Covered Bridge formerly in Brookline was removed due to rot in November 2010 and removed from this list.
- The Deer Park Covered Bridge formerly in Bennington is reportedly gone and was removed from this list.

== See also ==
- List of covered bridges in Vermont
- List of bridges on the National Register of Historic Places in Vermont
- List of Vermont-related topics
