= Gilead Brook Bridge =

- U.S. National Register of Historic Places
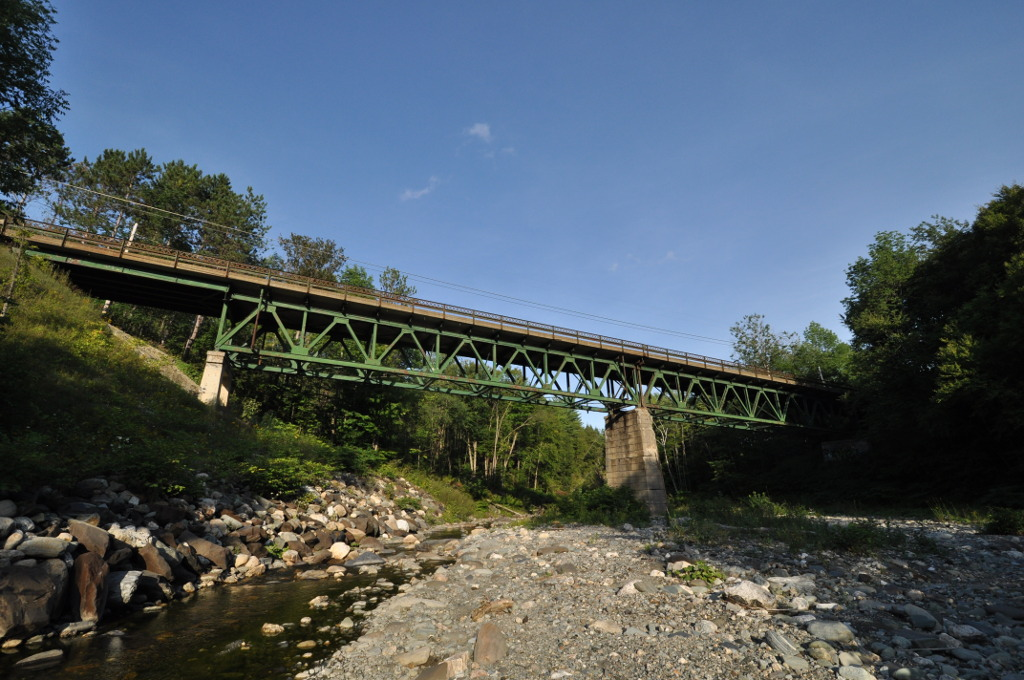

- Location within Vermont Location within the United States
- Location: VT 12 over Gilead Brook, Bethel, Vermont
- Coordinates: 43°52′25″N 72°38′52″W
- Area: less than one acre
- Built: 1928
- Architectural style: Warren deck truss bridge
- MPS: Metal Truss, Masonry, and Concrete Bridges in Vermont MPS
- NRHP reference No.: 90001492
- Added to NRHP: October 11, 1990

The Gilead Brook Bridge was an historic bridge which carried Vermont Route 12 across Gilead Brook north of the center of Bethel, Vermont. Built in 1928, it was one of four multi-span Warren deck truss bridges built in the state after extensive flooding in 1927. It was listed on the National Register of Historic Places in 1990. It was replaced in 2019-2020.

== Description and history ==
The Gilead Brook Bridge is located in northern Bethel, carrying Vermont Route 12 across Gilead Brook just south of its junction with Gilead Brook Road. It is a four-span Warren deck truss bridge, resting on concrete abutments and piers. It is 326 feet (99 m) long and 26 feet (7.9 m) wide, and rises about 33 feet (10 m) above the brook. The trusses are assembled with rivets, and the approach spans consist of rolled I-beams with extra plates on the lower flange for additional reinforcement. The bridge deck is concrete, with concrete curbs, and carries two lanes of traffic.

The bridge was built in 1928 as part of a major bridge-building program after extensive flooding in the state in 1927. At that time, Route 12 was one of the major north-south routes in the White River valley between White River Junction and Montpelier. It is one of only four Warren deck truss bridges built at the time, and is nearly identical to the former Ottauquechee River Bridge, which carried United States Route 5 in Hartland. These types of trusses were used by the state to replace the longest spans, and was well suited to the deep stream bed and inclined route of the roadway.

== See also ==
- National Register of Historic Places listings in Windsor County, Vermont
- List of bridges on the National Register of Historic Places in Vermont
