= Winooski Street Bridge =

- Bridge 31
- U.S. National Register of Historic Places
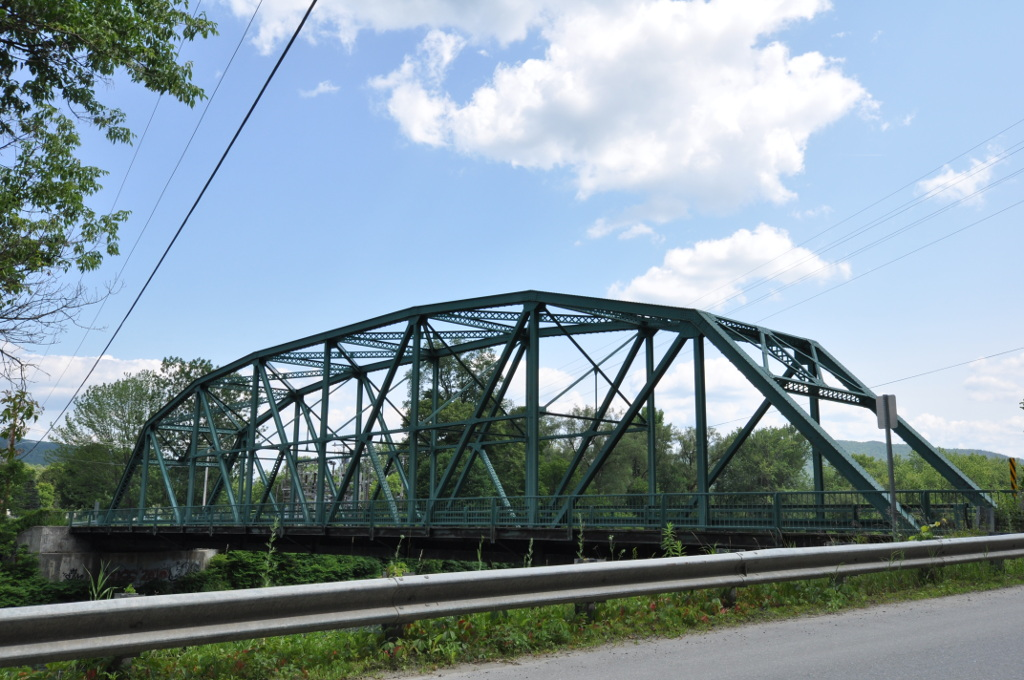

- Location within Vermont
- Location: Winooski St., Duxbury and Waterbury, Vermont
- Coordinates: 44°20′21″N 72°45′51″W
- Area: less than one acre
- Built: 1928
- Built by: Bethlehem Steel
- Architectural style: Parker through truss
- MPS: Metal Truss, Masonry, and Concrete Bridges in Vermont MPS
- NRHP reference No.: 06000703
- Added to NRHP: August 9, 2006

The Winooski Street Bridge is a historic bridge carrying Winooski Street across the Winooski River between Duxbury and Waterbury, Vermont. Built in 1928, it is a Parker through truss, one of only two of this type on the Winooski River and an increasingly rare bridge type in the state. It was listed on the National Register of Historic Places in 2006 as Bridge 31.

== Description and history ==
The Winooski Street Bridge is located in southern Waterbury and northern Duxbury, where the west-flowing Winooski River forms the border between the two communities. It is located a short way south of downtown Waterbury and west of the rural center of Duxbury, and is one of two bridges joining the two communities (the other carries United States Route 2 further to the east). Winooski Street runs south from downtown Waterbury to the bridge, at whose southern end River Street in Duxbury parallels the river. The bridge is a single-span Parker through truss, 202 feet (62 m) long, set on concrete abutments which are themselves set partially on remnants of older stone abutments. It has a width of 25.5 feet (7.8 m), and has a sidewalk cantilevered onto the downstream (western) side. The bridge deck is concrete laid on steel stringers and floor beams.

The bridge was built in 1928 after Vermont's devastating 1927 floods, which destroyed more than 1,200 bridges. The state embarked on a massive construction program, in which largely standardized designs and construction methods were used to build replacement bridges. This bridge was designed by H.L. Shoemaker, and its truss elements were fabricated by the Bethlehem Steel. Its abutments were rebuilt in the 1970s, and the bridge itself underwent rehabilitation in the 2000s.

The first bridge on the site was probably a covered bridge, built c. 1890. By 1924, it had been replaced by a steel truss bridge, which was washed away by the 1927 flood.

== See also ==
- National Register of Historic Places listings in Washington County, Vermont
- List of bridges on the National Register of Historic Places in Vermont
