= Bridge 12 =

- U.S. National Register of Historic Places
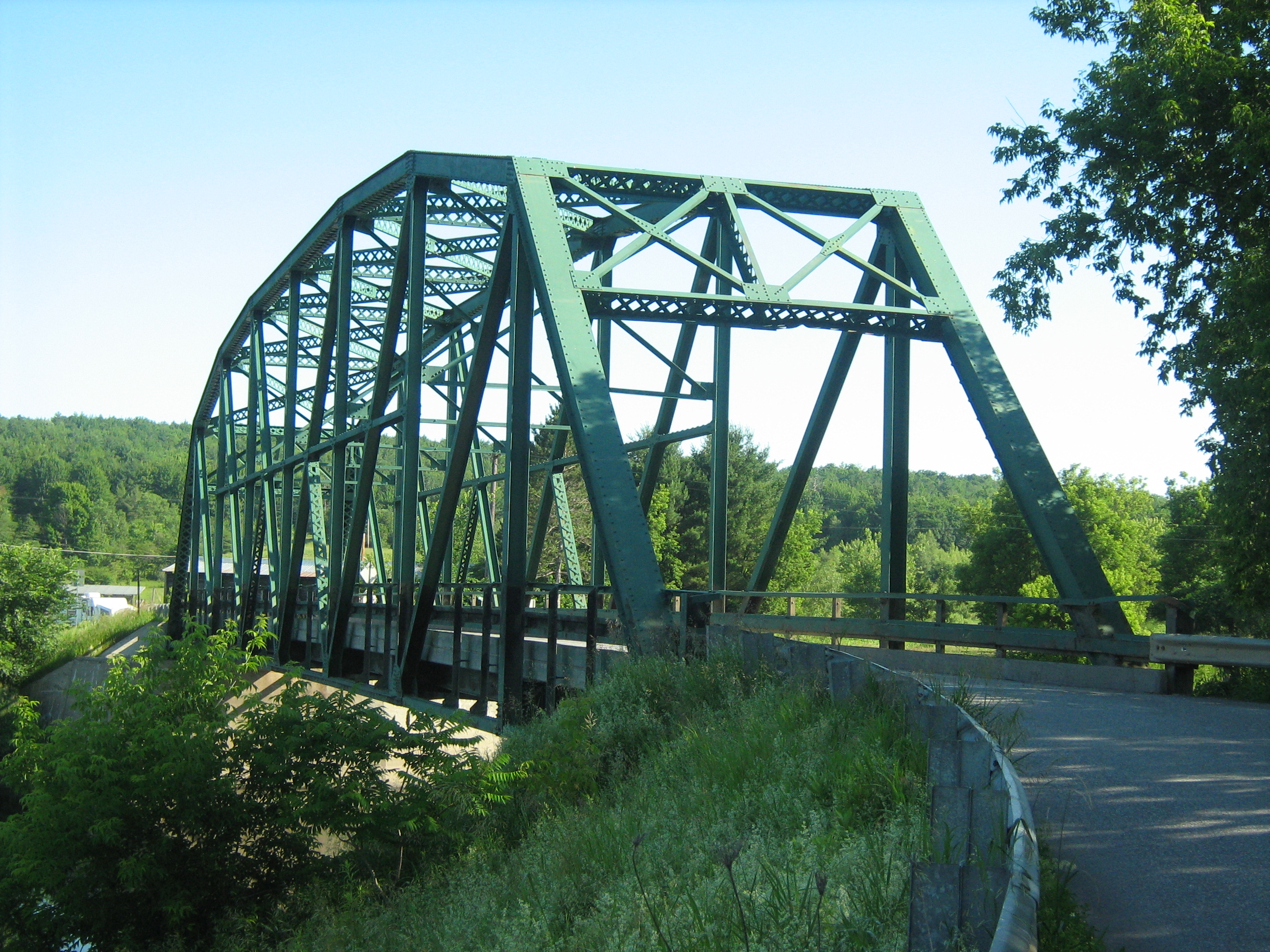

- Location within Vermont Location within the United States
- Location: Boston Post Rd., Enosburg, Vermont
- Coordinates: 44°55′11″N 72°45′26″W
- Area: less than one acre
- Built: 1929
- Architectural style: Parker through truss
- MPS: Metal Truss, Masonry, and Concrete Bridges in Vermont MPS
- NRHP reference No.: 07001299
- Added to NRHP: December 20, 2007

Bridge 12 is a historic Parker through truss bridge, carrying Boston Post Road across the Missisquoi River in Enosburg, Vermont. Built in 1929 in the wake of Vermont's devastating 1927 floods, it is one a shrinking number of surviving truss bridges on the river. It was listed on the National Register of Historic Places in 2007.

== Description and history ==
Bridge 12 is located in a rural area of northern Enosburg, northeast of the village of Enosburgh Falls. It carries Boston Post Road (Town Highway 2) across the Missisquoi River, just south of its junction with Vermont Route 105, a major regional east-west road. The bridge is 204 feet (62 m) long, and rests on concrete abutments. It has an overall width of 18 feet 9 inches (5.72 m), and a roadway width of 16 feet 6 inches (5.03 m). Each truss has eight triangular panels, the central ones stiffened by counter-diagonal struts, and reaching a maximum depth of 32 feet 7.5 inches (9.944 m). The trusses are joined together by a network of sway bracing. The bridge deck is concrete resting on a network of steel stringers and floor beams.

The bridge was built in 1929 to a state-approved design by L.H. Shoemaker, and the truss elements were fabricated by the Lackawanna Steel Construction Company of Buffalo, New York. The crossing site probably had a number of timber-frame bridges, the earliest definitively dated to the 1870s. The bridge was built in the wake of floods that washed away more than 1,200 bridges in Vermont, and accelerated the standardization of bridge construction in the state. This is one of a small number of surviving truss bridges on the Missisquoi River.

== See also ==
- National Register of Historic Places listings in Franklin County, Vermont
- List of bridges on the National Register of Historic Places in Vermont
