= Middlebury Gorge Concrete Arch Bridge =

- U.S. National Register of Historic Places
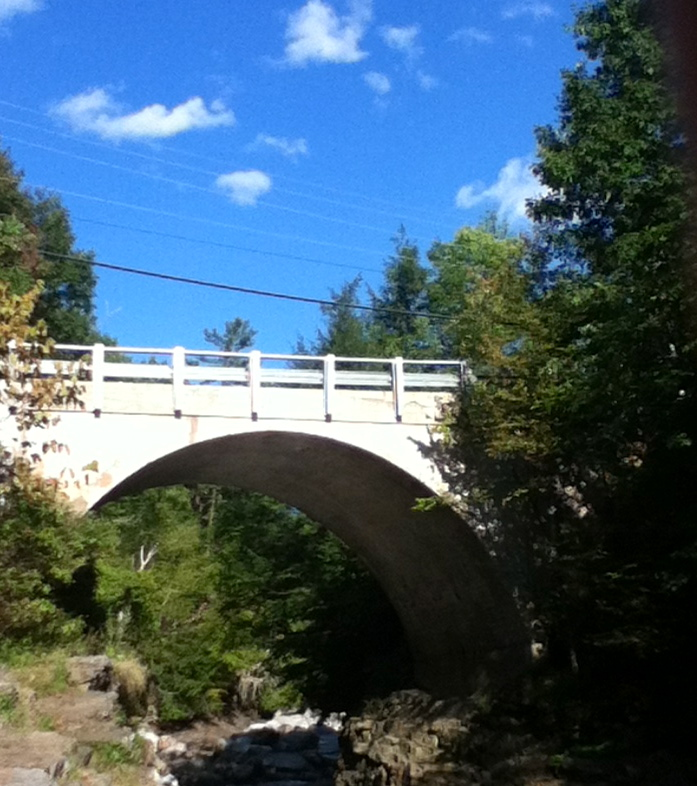

- Location within Vermont Location within the United States
- Location: VT 125 over the Middlebury River, Middlebury, Vermont
- Coordinates: 43°58′12″N 73°5′11″W
- Area: less than one acre
- Built: 1924
- Architectural style: Concrete arch bridge
- MPS: Metal Truss, Masonry, and Concrete Bridges in Vermont MPS
- NRHP reference No.: 91001604
- Added to NRHP: November 14, 1991

The Middlebury Gorge Concrete Arch Bridge is a historic concrete arch bridge, carrying Vermont Route 125 over the Middlebury River in eastern Middlebury, Vermont. The bridge was built in 1924, and is a well-preserved example of an early concrete bridge. It was listed on the National Register of Historic Places in 1991.

== Description and history ==
The Middlebury Gorge Concrete Arch Bridge is located in the upland area of eastern Middlebury, carrying Vermont Route 125 across a narrow gorge en route to one of three passes across the Green Mountains in eastern Addison County. The bridge consists of a basically semicircular arch made out of poured reinforced concrete. Its span is 42 feet (13 m), with a total structure length of 49 feet (15 m). It is 34 feet (10 m) in height and has a width of 24 feet (7.3 m), carrying two lanes of traffic. The sides of the bridge are simply decorated, with a beltcourse running along the length of the top, and paneled pilastered pillars at the corners.

The bridge was built in 1924, and is one of the state's few such bridges to predate (and survive) its devastating 1927 floods. The bridge's scenic siting was judged a better setting for a more monumentally appearing arch bridge than the then-common alternative, a metal truss bridge. The bridge was built out of eight separately poured concrete sections, using locally sourced materials. Its principal defect is the loss of one of the corner posts.

== See also ==
- National Register of Historic Places listings in Addison County, Vermont
- List of bridges on the National Register of Historic Places in Vermont
