= Woodstock Warren Through Truss Bridge =

- U.S. National Register of Historic Places
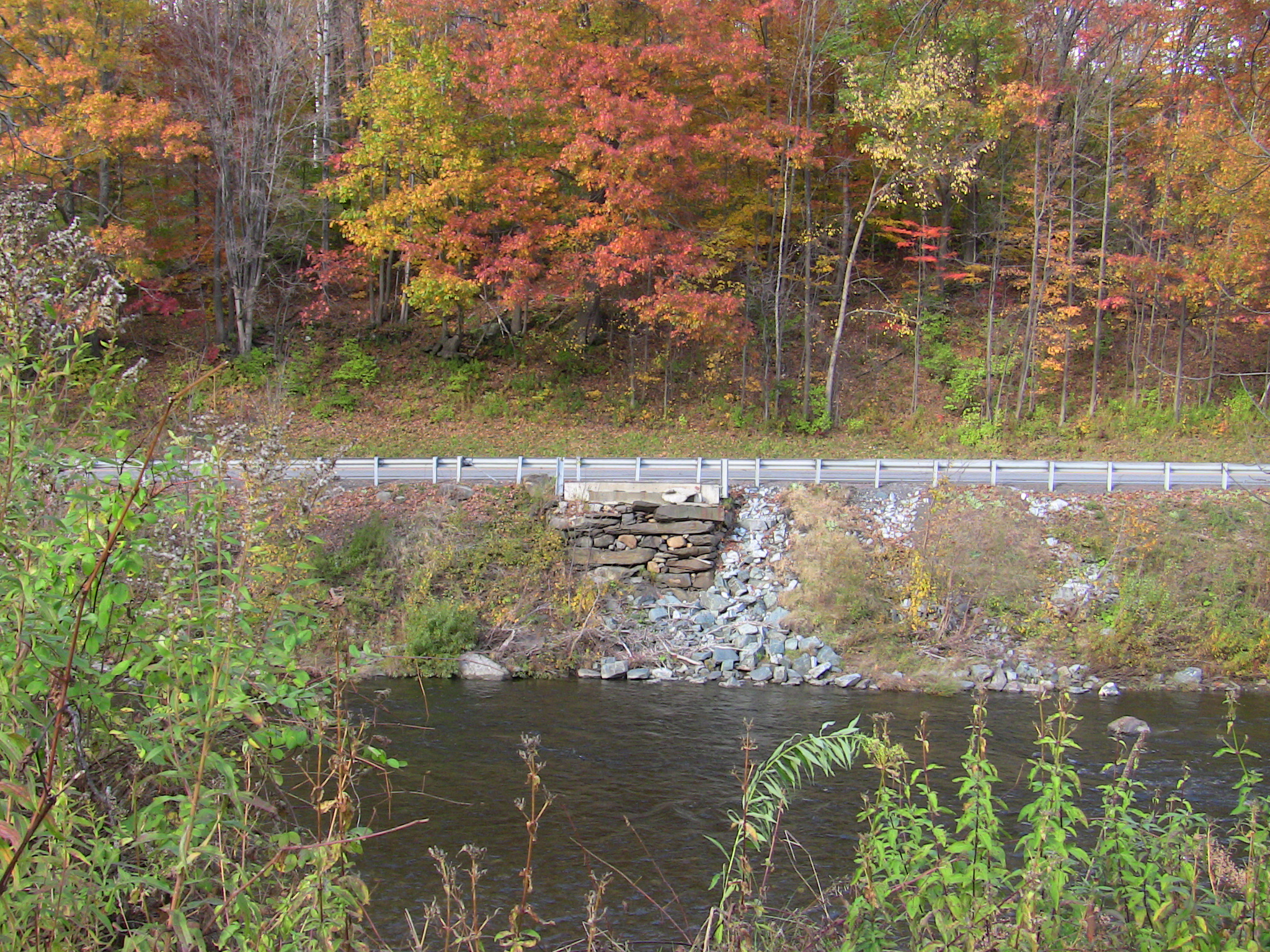
- Surviving bridge abutment adjacent to US 4

- Location within Vermont Location within the United States
- Nearest city: Woodstock, Vermont
- Coordinates: 43°36′1″N 72°35′22″W
- Area: less than one acre
- Built: 1925
- Architectural style: Warren through truss
- MPS: Metal Truss, Masonry, and Concrete Bridges in Vermont MPS
- NRHP reference No.: 92000987
- Added to NRHP: August 18, 1992

The Woodstock Warren Through Truss Bridge was a historic iron bridge that carried Bridges Road (Town Highway 24) across the Ottauquechee River in western Woodstock, Vermont. The bridge was built in 1925, and was a rare example of the state of a double-intersection Warren through truss. The bridge was swept away by flooding caused by Hurricane Irene in 2011; it was listed on the National Register of Historic Places in 1992.

== Description and history ==
The Woodstock Warren Through Truss Bridge stood in western Woodstock, roughly midway between the villages of West Woodstock and Bridgewater. The Ottauquechee River flows east in this area, and its route is closely paralleled on the north by U.S. Route 4. On the southern side of the river, Bridges Road runs west from the West Woodstock Bridge, and now ends at the point where this bridge once stood. The bridge was a single-span structure 121 feet (37 m) long, with a roadway width of 12.2 feet (3.7 m) and a portal clearance of 16.4 feet (5.0 m). The bridge's supporting Warren trusses deviated from typical instances of the form by having additional diagonal members that increased the bridge's carrying capacity.

The bridge was probably built in 1925, when the town was making a number of improvements to its transportation infrastructure. The bridge survived Vermont's devastating floods of 1927, but was washed away in 2011 by floods caused by the remnants of Hurricane Irene.

== See also ==
- National Register of Historic Places listings in Windsor County, Vermont
- List of bridges on the National Register of Historic Places in Vermont
