= Bridge 15 =

- U.S. National Register of Historic Places
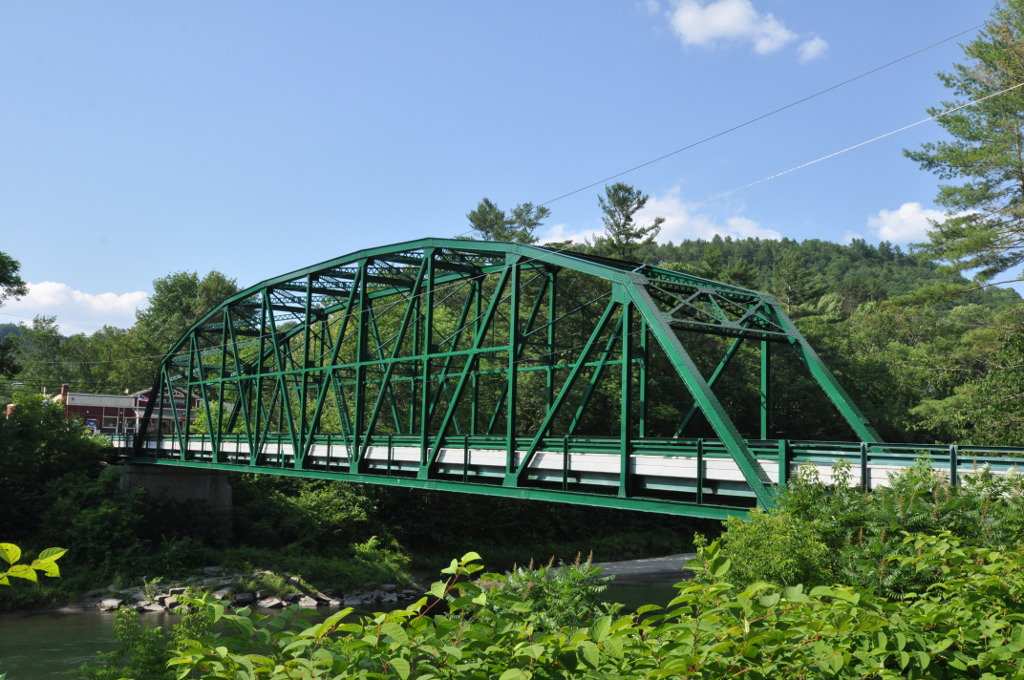

- Location within Vermont Location within the United States
- Location: F.A.S. Hwy 177 (River Rd.), Sharon, Vermont
- Coordinates: 43°46′55″N 72°27′36″W
- Area: less than one acre
- Built: 1928
- Architect: American Bridge Company
- Architectural style: Parker through truss
- MPS: Metal Truss, Masonry, and Concrete Bridges in Vermont MPS
- NRHP reference No.: 08000792
- Added to NRHP: August 19, 2008

Bridge 15, also known locally as the River Bridge, spans the White River in Sharon, Vermont. Built in 1928, this multi-span Parker truss bridge is one of a shrinking number of White River crossings of this type. It was listed on the National Register of Historic Places in 2008.

== Description and history ==
Bridge 15 is located in central Sharon, west of the village center. It spans the White River at a point upstream from a southward bend in the river, with the river flowing roughly north of east at the crossing point. The bridge connects Vermont Route 14 on the north side to River Road and Station Road on the south side. It has three spans, the central one a Parker truss 220 feet (67 m) in length. The outer spans are of steel girder construction, and give the structure a total length of 324 feet (99 m). The bridge has a width of 22 feet 9 inches (6.93 m), with a roadway width of 20 feet (6.1 m) (two lanes). The Parker truss has a central depth of 37 feet (11 m), and a portal depth of 14 feet 7 inches (4.45 m).

The bridge was built in 1928, following devastating 1927 floods that destroyed more than 1,200 bridges in the state. The Parker truss was one of the standardized designs adopted by the state for spans of this length. The bridge was built on the site where bridges have stood since 1869, providing the only access within Sharon between parts separated by the river. The bridge that was washed away in 1927 was probably also a metal truss span, documented in a 1909 photograph. At one time there were five Parker truss bridges spanning the river in Sharon and its neighboring communities; at the time of this bridge's listing on the National Register, only three survived. One of those, the National Register-listed West Hartford Bridge, was replaced by a modern structure in 2006.

== See also ==
- National Register of Historic Places listings in Windsor County, Vermont
- List of bridges on the National Register of Historic Places in Vermont
