= Bridge 9 (Sheldon, Vermont) =

- U.S. National Register of Historic Places
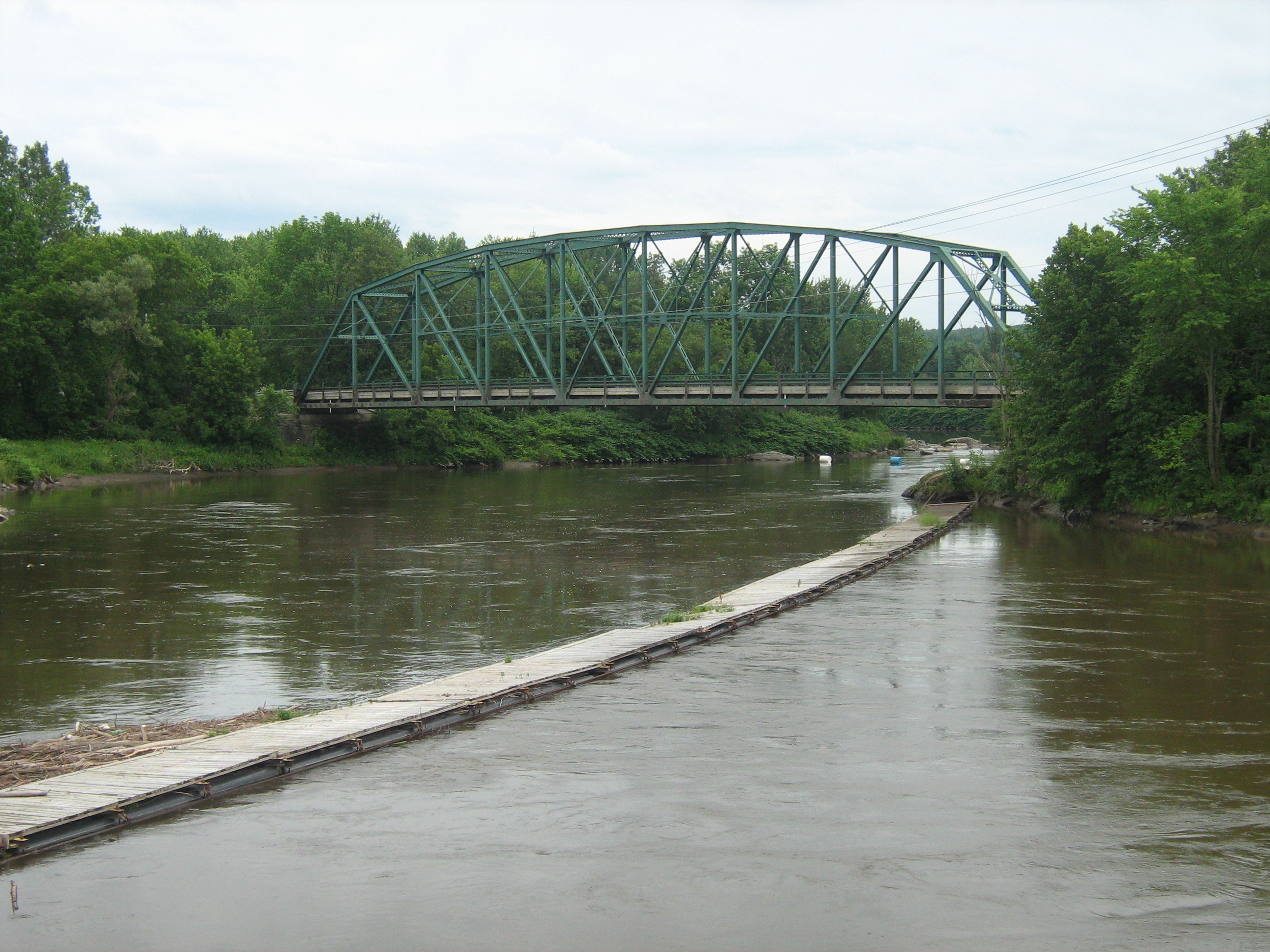

- Location within Vermont Location within the United States
- Location: Shawville Rd., Sheldon, Vermont
- Coordinates: 44°54′42″N 72°58′22″W
- Area: less than one acre
- Built: 1928
- Built by: Lackawanna Steel Construction Co.
- Architectural style: Parker through truss
- MPS: Metal Truss, Masonry, and Concrete Bridges in Vermont MPS
- NRHP reference No.: 07001298
- Added to NRHP: December 20, 2007

Bridge 9 is a historic Parker through truss bridge, carrying Shawville Road across the Missisquoi River in Sheldon, Vermont. Built in 1928 after Vermont's devastating 1927 floods, it is one of the few surviving Parker truss bridges on the Missisquoi. It was listed on the National Register of Historic Places in 2007.

== Description and history ==
Bridge 9 is located just northeast of the village of Sheldon Springs, carrying Shawville Road over the Missisquoi River between that village and the rural hamlet of Shawville. It is a single-span Parker through truss structure, 250 feet (76 m) in length, resting on stone and concrete abutments. The bridge has nine truss panels, those at the center reaching a total height of 38 feet (12 m). The bridge is 18 feet 3 inches (5.56 m) wide, with a roadway width of 16 feet (4.9 m). The bridge deck is concrete laid on steel floor beams supported by steel stringers.

The bridge was built in 1928 to plans by the Lackawanna Steel Construction Company of Buffalo, New York, replacing an 1888 wrought iron suspension bridge. The site, just above Bancroft Falls on the river, has had a bridge of some type since the late 18th century. The bridge is of a type standardized by state engineers for bridges longer than 250 feet (76 m), during the post-flood construction period, in which more than 1,200 bridges were built.

== See also ==
- National Register of Historic Places listings in Franklin County, Vermont
- List of bridges on the National Register of Historic Places in Vermont
