= South Street Bridge =

South Street Bridge could refer to:

- South Street Bridge (Poultney, Vermont)
- South Street Bridge (Philadelphia, Pennsylvania)
