= Stockbridge Four Corners Bridge =

- U.S. National Register of Historic Places
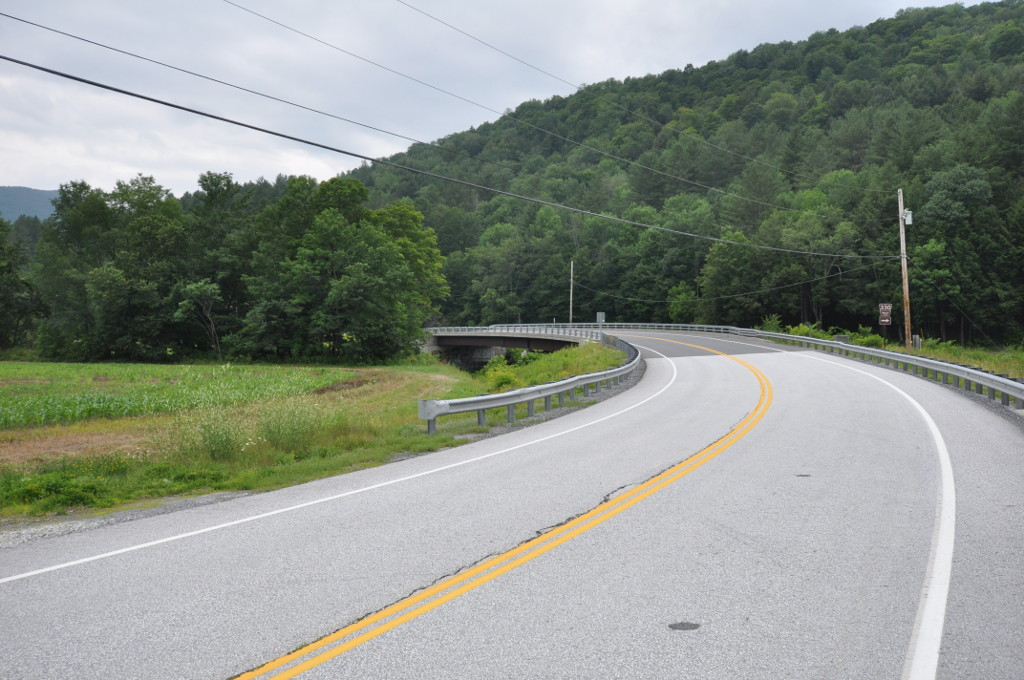
- The modern deck girder bridge at the site

- Location within Vermont Location within the United States
- Location: VT 100 over the White R., Stockbridge, Vermont
- Coordinates: 43°46′56″N 72°45′30″W
- Area: less than one acre
- Built: 1929
- Built by: Berlin Construction Co.
- Architectural style: Pratt through truss
- MPS: Metal Truss, Masonry, and Concrete Bridges in Vermont MPS
- NRHP reference No.: 91001611
- Added to NRHP: November 14, 1991

The Stockbridge Four Corners Bridge is a steel girder bridge carrying Vermont Route 100 across the White River near the village of Stockbridge Four Corners in Stockbridge, Vermont. The bridge is a 2009 replacement for 1929 Pratt through truss bridge, which was listed on the National Register of Historic Places in 1991. The historic bridge replaced an older covered bridge destroyed by Vermont's devastating 1927 floods.

== Site and modern bridge ==
The bridge site is locate just southwest of the village of Stockbridge Four Corners, which is formed by a right-angle turn of Vermont Route 100 and its junction with Stockbridge Common Road and Blackmer Boulevard. Vermont 100 runs west from the junction, and then crosses the river before bending to parallel the river running further southwest. The present bridge, constructed in 2008-2009, is a steel girder bridge whose deck is integrated into its abutments. The bridge is curved to accommodate the transition from the crossing to the southwest continuation of the roadway.

== Historic bridges ==
Early bridges were built on the site by the town. A covered bridge was washed away from the site by Vermont's devastating floods of 1927, which caused particularly severe damage in the White River valley. In 1929, the state retained the Berlin Construction Company to build a Pratt through truss at the site; it was built out of steel I-beams and placed on rubblestone abutments that were later reinforced with concrete footings. It was of a standardized design developed by the state in the wake of the floods to more effectively produce the many bridges requiring replacement.

== See also ==
- National Register of Historic Places listings in Windsor County, Vermont
- List of bridges on the National Register of Historic Places in Vermont
