= Winooski River Bridge =

- U.S. National Register of Historic Places
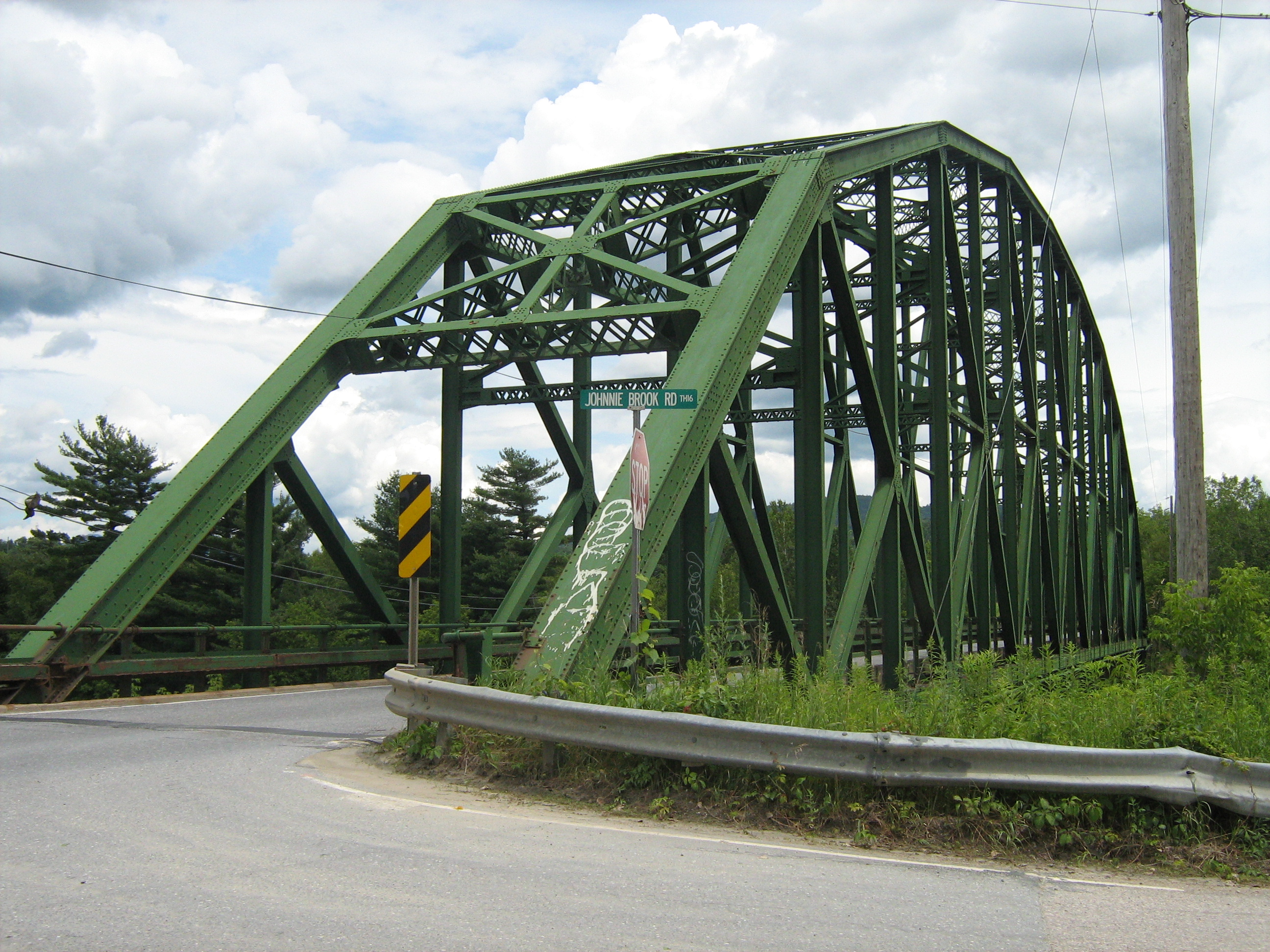

- Location within Vermont Location within the United States
- Location: US 2 over the Winooski River, Richmond, Vermont
- Coordinates: 44°25′24″N 73°1′1″W
- Area: less than one acre
- Built: 1929
- Built by: American Bridge Co.
- Architectural style: Pennsylvania through truss
- MPS: Metal Truss, Masonry, and Concrete Bridges in Vermont MPS
- NRHP reference No.: 90000775
- Added to NRHP: May 30, 1990

The Winooski River Bridge, also known locally as the Checkered House Bridge, is a historic Pennsylvania through truss bridge, carrying U.S. Route 2 (US 2) across the Winooski River in Richmond, Vermont. Built in 1929, it is one of only five Pennsylvania trusses in the state, and was the longest bridge built in the state's bridge-building program that followed massive flooding in 1927. The bridge was listed on the National Register of Historic Places in 1990.

== Description and history ==
The Winooski River Bridge stands in a somewhat rural area of western Richmond, set roughly east–west across the Winooski River just north of the bridges carrying Interstate 89 (I-89). It is a single-span Pennsylvania through truss structure, 368 feet (112 m) in length and 21 feet (6.4 m) wide. Its portals have a clearance of 17 feet (5.2 m), and the bridge stands about 32 feet (9.8 m) above the water on concrete abutments. Its trusses have extra reinforcing sub-struts to improve its performance under heavy loads.

The bridge was built in 1929, as part of a major bridge-building program by the state, following flooding in 1927 that destroyed more than 1,200 bridges. The state sought to use standardized designs for as many of the replacement bridges as possible. This bridge, built by the American Bridge Company, is one of the small number that does not follow a standard design, due to difficulties in fitting the standard design to the site. It is the longest single span of the 1,600 bridges built in the three-year rebuilding program, and is one of just five Pennsylvania truss bridges in the state.

== See also ==
- National Register of Historic Places listings in Chittenden County, Vermont
- List of bridges on the National Register of Historic Places in Vermont
