= Great Flood of 1927 =

Great Flood of 1927 may refer to:

- Great Mississippi Flood of 1927
- Great Vermont Flood of 1927
