= West Hartford Bridge =

- U.S. National Register of Historic Places
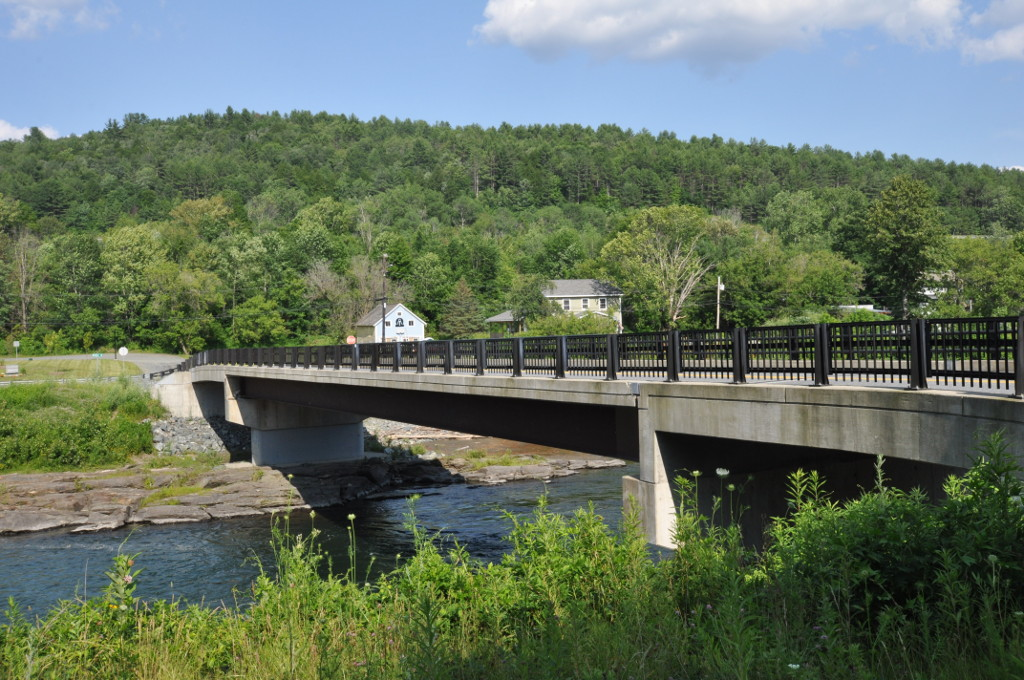
- The modern steel girder bridge

- Location within Vermont
- Location: Town Hwy. 14 at VT 14 over the White R., Hartford, Vermont
- Coordinates: 43°42′44″N 72°25′6″W
- Area: less than one acre
- Built: 1929
- Architectural style: Parker Through Truss
- MPS: Metal Truss, Masonry, and Concrete Bridges in Vermont MPS
- NRHP reference No.: 92001524
- Added to NRHP: October 29, 1992

The West Hartford Bridge is a steel deck girder bridge carrying Town Highway 4 (the Quechee-West Hartford Road) across the White River in the village of West Hartford, Vermont. It was built by the town with state assistance in 2006, replacing a Parker through truss bridge built by the state after Vermont's devastating 1927 floods. The 1929 bridge was listed on the National Register of Historic Places in 1992.

== Setting ==
The West Hartford Bridge is located near the southern end of the linear village of West Hartford, stretched out along Vermont Route 14 several miles upriver (north) from White River Junction, Hartford's economic hub. The bridge provides a connection between West Hartford and the village of Quechee to the south, and historically provided access to other parts of West Hartford village which were washed away in the 1927 floods. The bridge crosses the river in an east–west orientation.

== Historic bridges ==
The 1929 bridge was a Parker through truss structure, built out of rolled steel I-beams riveted together. It was virtually identical to the bridge in Sharon, several miles upriver, which was built about the same time. It was 220 feet (67 m) long and 21.3 feet (6.5 m) wide, with poured concrete abutments. The 1927 floods, the worst in the state's history, washed away all of the bridges along the White River downstream from Rochester, in the foothills of the Green Mountains. This bridge and that in Sharon were part of a massive building program orchestrated with federal, state, and local funds, that saw the construction of about 1,600 bridges in the space of a few years.

== See also ==
- National Register of Historic Places listings in Windsor County, Vermont
- List of bridges on the National Register of Historic Places in Vermont
