= List of bridges on the National Register of Historic Places in Vermont =

This is a list of bridges and tunnels on the National Register of Historic Places in the U.S. state of Vermont.

Name	Image	Built	Listed	Location	County	Type
Arlington Green Covered Bridge	Arlington Covered Bridge	1852	1973-08-28	Arlington; 43°6′16″N 73°13′14″W	Bennington	Town lattice truss
Bartonsville Covered Bridge		1871	1973-07-02	Rockingham; 43°13′27″N 72°32′12″W	Windham	Town lattice truss, destroyed in 2011 by flash flooding from Hurricane Irene.
Bedell Covered Bridge		1866	1975-05-28	Newbury; 44°2′53″N 72°4′20″W	Orange	Burr arch truss; destroyed by windstorm in 1979
Bennington Falls Covered Bridge		1889	1973-08-28	Bennington; 42°54′46″N 73°14′3″W	Bennington	Town lattice truss
Best's Covered Bridge	Best's Covered Bridge	1889	1973-07-02	Windsor; 43°27′19″N 72°30′58″W	Windsor	
Bloomfield-Nulhegan River Route 102 Bridge	Bloomfield-Nulhegan River Route 102 Bridge	1937	1991-11-14	Bloomfield; 44°45′10″N 71°38′48″W	Essex	Pratt through truss
Bowers Covered Bridge	Bowers Covered Bridge	1919	1973-08-28	Windsor; 43°27′42″N 72°29′29″W	Windsor	Tied Arch, washed 200 feet downstream in 2011 in Hurricane Irene flooding; rebuilt
Bradley Covered Bridge	Bradley Covered Bridge	1878	1977-06-13	Lyndon; 44°32′31″N 72°0′38″W	Caledonia	Queenpost truss
Braley Covered Bridge		ca. 1904	1974-06-13	Randolph; 43°55′42″N 72°33′26″W	Orange	multiple Kingpost truss
Bridge 12	Bridge 12	1929	2007-12-20	Enosburg; 44°55′11″N 72°45′26″W	Franklin	Parker through truss
Bridge 15		1928	2008-8-19	Sharon	Windsor	Parker through truss
Bridge 19	Bridge 19	1928	2007-09-28	Brookline; 42°59′50″N 72°38′16″W	Windham	Camelback through truss; aka Brookline-Newfane Bridge.
Bridge 22	Bridge 22	1934	2010-11-30	Bradford	Orange	
Bridge 26	Bridge 26	1908	2006-06-07	Weybridge; 44°4′23″N 73°11′39″W	Addison	Riveted lattice truss
Bridge 31		1928	2006-08-09	Waterbury; 44°20′21″N 72°45′51″W	Washington	Parker through truss
Bridge 4		1923	2009-11-5	Poultney	Rutland	
Bridge 6	Bridge 6	1928	2007-12-20	Johnson; 44°38′3″N 72°41′5″W	Lamoille	Pratt through truss
Bridge 9	Bridge 9	1928	2007-12-20	Sheldon; 44°54′42″N 72°58′22″W	Franklin	Parker through truss
Bridge No. 27		1918	2006-01-11	Berlin; 44°11′22″N 72°38′27″W	Washington	Warren pony truss
Bridge Number VT105-10		1947	2018-12-11	Sheldon; 44°54′06.0″N 72°57′06.0″W	Franklin	Four-span girder
Bridgewater Corners Bridge		1928	1992-10-29	Bridgewater; 43°35′12″N 72°39′25″W	Windsor	Pratt Through Truss Bridge
Brown Covered Bridge		1880	1974-01-21	Shrewsbury; 43°33′58″N 72°55′10″W	Rutland	Town lattice truss
Burrington Covered Bridge	Burrington Covered Bridge		1974-06-13	Lyndon; 44°33′13″N 71°58′12″W	Caledonia	Queenpost truss
Cedar Swamp Covered Bridge		1864, 1865	1974-09-10	West Salisbury; 43°55′05.4″N 73°10′26″W	Addison	Town lattice truss; destroyed by fire in 2016
Center Road Culvert		1899	2020-03-02	East Montpelier; 44°17′09.3″N 72°31′18.7″W	Washington	Stone box culvert
Centre Covered Bridge	Centre Covered Bridge	1872, 1873	1974-06-20	Lyndon; 44°32′36″N 72°0′6″W	Caledonia	Paddleford truss
Chamberlin Mill Covered Bridge	Chamberlin Mill Covered Bridge	1881	1974-07-30	Lyndon; 44°30′59″N 72°1′0″W	Caledonia	Queenpost truss
Cilley Covered Bridge	Cilley Covered Bridge	1883	1974-09-10	Tunbridge; 43°52′59″N 72°30′17″W	Orange	multiple Kingpost truss
Coburn Covered Bridge		1851	1974-10-09	East Montpelier; 44°16′51″N 72°27′18″W	Washington	Queenpost truss
Colburn Bridge	Colburn Bridge	1899	1990-10-11	Pittsford; 43°42′25″N 73°1′17″W	Rutland	Masonry arch bridge
Cold River Bridge	Cold River Bridge	1928	1991-11-14	Clarendon; 43°34′12″N 72°57′59″W	Rutland	Parker through truss; demolished.
Columbia Covered Bridge		1912	1976-12-12	Lemington; 44°51′12″N 71°33′5″W	Essex	Howe truss
Comstock Covered Bridge	Comstock Covered Bridge	1883	1974-11-19	Montgomery; 44°53′59″N 72°38′39″W	Franklin	Town lattice truss
Cooley Covered Bridge	Cooley Covered Bridge	1849	1974-01-24	Pittsford; 43°41′24″N 73°1′45″W	Rutland	Town lattice truss
Cornish-Windsor Covered Bridge		1866	1976-11-21	Windsor; 43°28′26″N 72°23′1″W	Windsor	Town lattice truss
Creamery Covered Bridge	Creamery Covered Bridge	1879	1973-08-28	Brattleboro; 42°50′58″N 72°35′12″W	Windham	Town lattice truss
Dean Covered Bridge	Dean Covered Bridge	ca. 1840	1974-09-10	Brandon; 43°46′43″N 73°5′51″W	Rutland	Town lattice truss; destroyed by arsonist in 1986
Depot Covered Bridge	Depot Covered Bridge	ca. 1840	1974-01-21	Pittsford; 43°42′34″N 73°2′36″W	Rutland	Town lattice truss
Douglas & Jarvis Patent Parabolic Truss Iron Bridge	Douglas & Jarvis Patent Parabolic Truss Iron Bridge	1887	1974-03-21	Highgate Falls; 44°56′3″N 73°2′53″W	Franklin	Parabolic Truss Iron
East Fairfield Covered Bridge		ca. 1865	1974-11-19	East Fairfield; 44°47′8″N 72°51′49″W	Franklin	Queenpost truss
East Putney Brook Stone Arch Bridge	East Putney Brook Stone Arch Bridge	1902	1976-12-12	East Putney; 42°59′9″N 72°28′9″W	Windham	Masonry arch
East Shoreham Covered Railroad Bridge		1897	1974-06-13	Shoreham; 43°51′33″N 73°15′22″W	Addison	
Fairfax Covered Bridge		1865	1974-11-05	Fairfax; 44°39′49″N 73°0′39″W	Franklin	Town lattice trusses
Fisher Covered Railroad Bridge	Fisher Covered Railroad Bridge	1908	1974-10-01	Wolcott; 44°31′56″N 72°25′43″W	Lamoille	Louvered Monitor Type
Flint Covered Bridge	Flint Covered Bridge	1845	1974-09-10	Tunbridge; 43°56′56″N 72°27′31″W	Orange	Queenpost truss
Follett Stone Arch Bridge Historic District	Follett Stone Arch Bridge Historic District - Negro Brook Bridge	ca. 1894, ca. 1910	1976-12-12	Townshend	Windham	Four stone arch bridges
Foundry Bridge	Foundry Bridge	1889	2007-07-11	Tunbridge; 43°54′52″N 72°28′37″W	Orange	Warren pony truss
Fuller Covered Bridge	Fuller Covered Bridge	1890	1974-12-23	Montgomery; 44°54′13″N 72°38′23″W	Franklin	Town lattice trusses
Gates Farm Covered Bridge		1897	1974-11-19	Cambridge; 44°38′44″N 72°52′23″W	Lamoille	Timber Burr arch truss
Gifford Covered Bridge		1904	1974-07-30	East Randolph; 43°55′0″N 72°33′25″W	Orange	multiple Kingpost truss
Gilead Brook Bridge		1928	1990-10-11	Bethel; 43°52′25″N 72°38′52″W	Windsor	Warren deck truss bridge
Gold Brook Covered Bridge	Emilys Bridge	ca. 1844	1974-10-01	Stowe; 44°26′25″N 72°40′49″W	Lamoille	timber Howe truss
Gorham Covered Bridge	Gorham Covered Bridge	1841	1974-02-12	Proctor; 43°40′48″N 73°2′17″W	Rutland	Town lattice truss
Gould's Mill Bridge	Gould's Mill Bridge	1929	2006-02-01	Springfield; 43°16′22″N 72°27′16″W	Windsor	Baltimore through truss
Great Eddy Covered Bridge		1833	1974-09-06	Waitsfield; 44°11′22″N 72°49′26″W	Washington	Burr truss
Green River Covered Bridge	Green River Covered Bridge	ca. 1870, ca. 1875	1973-08-28	Guilford; 42°46′31″N 72°40′4″W	Windham	Town lattice truss
Greenbanks Hollow Covered Bridge	Greenbanks Hollow Covered Bridge		1974-06-13	Danville; 44°22′38″N 72°7′20″W	Caledonia	Queenpost truss
Grist Mill Covered Bridge			1974-06-13	Cambridge; 44°38′11″N 72°49′32″W	Lamoille	Timber Burr arch truss
Hall Covered Bridge	Hall Covered Bridge	1867	1973-08-28	Bellows Falls; 43°8′12″N 72°29′16″W	Windham	Town lattice truss
Halpin Covered Bridge		1850	1974-09-10	Middlebury; 44°3′0″N 73°8′28″W	Addison	Town Lattice Truss
Hammond Covered Bridge		1842	1974-01-21	Pittsford; 43°43′14″N 73°3′14″W	Rutland	Town lattice truss
Hectorville Covered Bridge	Hectorville Covered Bridge	ca. 1860, ca. 1890	1974-11-20	Montgomery; 44°51′13″N 72°36′50″W	Franklin	Town lattice truss Disassembled and stored awaiting restoration
Henry Covered Bridge		ca. 1835	1973-08-28	Bennington; 42°54′45″N 73°15′18″W	Bennington	Town lattice truss
Holmes Creek Covered Bridge		c. 1870	1974-09-06	Charlotte; 44°19′59″N 73°17′40″W	Chittenden	king post with tied arch
Hopkins Covered Bridge	Hopkins Covered Bridge	1875	1974-11-20	Enosburg; 44°55′15″N 72°40′23″W	Franklin	Town lattice truss
Howe Covered Bridge	Howe Covered Bridge	1879	1974-09-10	Tunbridge; 43°51′53″N 72°29′58″W	Orange	multiple Kingpost truss
Hutchins Covered Bridge	Hutchins Covered Bridge	1883	1974-12-30	Montgomery; 44°51′30″N 72°36′45″W	Franklin	Town lattice trusses
Iron Bridge at Howard Hill Road	Iron Bridge at Howard Hill Road (2007 replacement)	1890; replaced 2007	1982-09-09	Cavendish; 43°24′16″N 72°34′32″W	Windsor	Historic bridge is Pratt through truss, replaced in 2007; now in storage
Jaynes Covered Bridge	Jaynes Covered Bridge	ca. 1877	1974-10-01	Waterville; 44°42′43″N 72°45′23″W	Lamoille	
Jeffersonville Bridge	Jeffersonville Bridge	1931	1991-11-14	Cambridge; 44°38′57″N 72°49′51″W	Lamoille	Parker through truss
Kendron Brook Bridge		ca. 1810	1992-08-27	Woodstock; 43°34′53″N 72°30′55″W	Windsor	Masonry arch bridge
Kidder Covered Bridge	Kidder Covered Bridge	ca. 1870	1973-07-02	Grafton; 43°10′8″N 72°36′21″W	Windham	Queenpost through truss
Kingsbury Covered Bridge		1904	1974-07-30	East Randolph; 43°52′52″N 72°34′56″W	Orange	multiple Kingpost truss
Kingsley Covered Bridge		ca. 1870	1974-02-12	Clarendon; 43°31′25″N 72°56′30″W	Rutland	Town lattice truss
Lamoille River Route 15-A Bridge	Lamoille River Route 15-A Bridge	1928	1991-11-14	Morristown; 44°33′51″N 72°34′1″W	Lamoille	Pratt through truss; bridge dismantled in 2007
Larkin Covered Bridge	Larkin Covered Bridge	1902	1974-07-30	Tunbridge; 43°55′22″N 72°27′56″W	Orange	multiple kingpost truss
Lincoln Covered Bridge	Lincoln Covered Bridge	1877	1973-08-28	Woodstock; 43°36′2″N 72°34′10″W	Windsor	Pratt truss system
Longley Covered Bridge	Longley Covered Bridge	1863	1974-12-30	Montgomery; 44°54′25″N 72°39′21″W	Franklin	Town lattice trusses
Lower Cox Brook Covered Bridge		1872	1974-10-15	Northfield; 44°10′21″N 72°39′12″W	Washington	Queenpost truss
Lyme–East Thetford Bridge	Lyme–East Thetford Bridge	1937	2020-03-27	East Thetford; 43.812144°N 72.1831°W	Orange	Parker truss
Marble Bridge		1915	1991-11-14	Proctor; 43°39′40″N 73°2′2″W	Rutland	Reinforced concrete bridge
Martin Covered Bridge	Martin Covered Bridge	1890	1974-10-09	Marshfield; 44°17′7″N 72°24′48″W	Washington	Single span Queenpost truss
Martin's Mill Covered Bridge	Martin's Mill Covered Bridge	ca. 1880	1973-08-28	Hartland; 43°31′56″N 72°23′47″W	Windsor	Town lattice truss
Medburyville Bridge	Medburyville Bridge	ca. 1896	1990-11-08	Wilmington; 42°52′16″N 72°55′12″W	Windham	Warren through truss
Middlebury Gorge Concrete Arch Bridge	Middlebury Gorge Concrete Arch Bridge	1924	1991-11-14	Middlebury; 43°58′12″N 73°5′11″W	Addison	Concrete arch bridge
Middlesex-Winooski River Bridge	Middlesex-Winooski River Bridge (modern replacement)	1928	1991-11-14	Middlesex; 44°18′22″N 72°41′48″W	Washington	Pratt through truss bridge; destroyed by Hurricane Irene
Mill Covered Bridge (Belvidere)	Mill Covered Bridge	1890	1974-11-19	Belvidere; 44°29′31″N 72°44′29″W	Lamoille	Queenpost truss
Mill Covered Bridge	Mill Covered Bridge (Tunbridge)	1883	1974-07-30	Tunbridge; 43°53′29″N 72°29′31″W	Orange	multiple Kingpost truss; destroyed by ice in 1999 and replicated in 2000
Missisquoi River Bridge	Missisquoi River Bridge	1929	1990-10-11	Richford; 45°0′49″N 72°35′16″W	Franklin	Parker through truss bridge
Montgomery Covered Bridge	Montgomery Covered Bridge	ca. 1877, ca. 1887	1974-10-18	Waterville; 44°42′20″N 72°45′39″W	Lamoille	
Morgan Covered Bridge	Morgan Covered Bridge	1887	1974-11-19	Belvidere; 44°44′36″N 72°43′37″W	Lamoille	
Mount Orne Covered Bridge		1911	1976-12-12	Lunenburg; 44°27′38″N 71°39′12″W	Essex	Howe truss
Moxley Covered Bridge	Moxley Covered Bridge	1886, 1887	1974-09-10	Chelsea; 43°57′25″N 72°27′49″W	Orange	
Northfield Falls Covered Bridge		1872	1974-08-13	Northfield; 44°10′20″N 72°39′18″W	Washington	Town lattice truss
Old Schoolhouse Bridge	Old Schoolhouse Bridge	ca. 1871	1971-03-31	Lyndon; 44°30′57″N 72°0′38″W	Caledonia	
Orne Covered Bridge	Orne Covered Bridge		1974-11-20	Coventry; 44°51′38″N 72°16′28″W	Orleans	Paddleford truss
Ottauquechee River Bridge	Ottauquechee River Bridge (modern replacement)	ca. 1930	1990-10-11	Hartland; 43°36′9″N 72°21′17″W	Windsor	Warren deck truss bridge; has been replaced by modern steel girder bridge
Pine Brook Covered Bridge		1855	1974-06-13	Waitsfield; 44°12′21″N 72°47′32″W	Washington	Kingpost truss
Piermont Bridge		1928	2001-06-06	Bradford; 43°58′41.0″N 72°06′43.3″W	Orange	Pennsylvania through truss
Poland Covered Bridge		1887	1974-10-09	Cambridge; 44°39′4″N 72°48′54″W	Lamoille	Timber Burr truss
Power House Covered Bridge		1870	1974-10-09	Johnson; 44°37′51″N 72°41′5″W	Lamoille	
Pulp Mill Covered Bridge		ca. 1820	1974-09-10	Middlebury; 44°1′29″N 73°10′41″W	Addison	Burr arch truss
Quechee Gorge Bridge	Quechee Gorge Bridge	1911, 1933	1990-10-11	Hartford; 43°38′16″N 72°24′32″W	Windsor	Metal deck truss bridge
Quinlan's Covered Bridge		1849	1974-09-10	East Charlotte; 44°16′35″N 73°11′4″W	Chittenden	Burr arch truss
Red Covered Bridge		1896	1974-10-16	Morristown; 44°31′7″N 72°40′40″W	Lamoille	Queenpost truss
Rice Farm Road Bridge	Rice Farm Road Bridge	1892	1995-11-07	Dummerston; 42°54′58″N 72°36′48″W	Windham	Warren Through Truss Bridge
River Road Covered Bridge	River Road Covered Bridge	1910	1974-11-19	North Troy; 44°57′21″N 72°23′39″W	Orleans	Town Lattice Truss; collapsed from damage caused by fire on February 6, 2021
Sacketts Brook Stone Arch Bridge	Sacketts Brook Stone Arch Bridge	1906	1976-12-12	Putney; 42°58′29″N 72°31′5″W	Windham	
Samuel Morey Memorial Bridge	The Samuel Morey Memorial Bridge	1936, 1938	1997-12-08	Fairlee; 43°54′25.8″N 72°08′22.3″W	Orange	Steel Arch
Sanderson Covered Bridge	Sanderson Covered Bridge	ca. 1838	1974-06-13	Brandon; 43°47′22″N 73°6′45″W	Rutland	Town Lattice Truss
Scott Covered Bridge	Scott Covered Bridge	1870	1973-08-28	Townshend; 43°2′53″N 72°41′50″W	Windham	Town lattice truss
Scribner Covered Bridge			1974-10-01	Johnson; 44°38′20″N 72°38′57″W	Lamoille	Queenpost Truss
Seguin Covered Bridge		ca. 1850	1974-09-06	Charlotte; 44°17′20″N 73°9′3″W	Chittenden	Burr arch truss; spelled "Sequin" in the National Register
Silk Covered Bridge		ca. 1840	1973-08-28	Bennington; 42°54′34″N 73°13′33″W	Bennington	Town lattice truss
Simpsonville Stone Arch Bridge	Simpsonville Stone Arch Bridge	ca. 1909	1977-04-11	Townshend; 43°4′13″N 72°39′19″W	Windham	
Slaughter House Covered Bridge		1872	1974-06-13	Northfield; 44°10′7″N 72°39′17″W	Washington	Queenpost truss
South Newfane Bridge	South Newfane Bridge	1939	1992-09-08	Newfane; 42°56′16″N 72°42′18″W	Windham	Pratt through-truss bridge
Spaulding Bridge	Spaulding Bridge	1905	2006-01-11	Cavendish; 43°22′57″N 72°36′31″W	Windsor	Parker pony truss
Stockbridge Four Corners Bridge	Stockbridge Four Corners Bridge (modern replacement)	1929	1991-11-14	Stockbridge; 43°46′56″N 72°45′30″W	Windsor	Pratt through truss; replaced in 2009
Stony Brook Covered Bridge		1899	1974-11-20	Northfield; 44°7′16″N 72°41′25″W	Washington	Kingpost truss
Swanton Covered Railroad Bridge	Swanton Covered Railroad Bridge	1898	1973-06-18	Swanton; 44°55′00″N 73°07′41″W	Franklin	Town-Pratt dbl lattice truss Destroyed by arson 1987
Taftsville Covered Bridge	Taftsville Covered Bridge	1836	1973-08-28	Woodstock; 43°38′23″N 72°28′5″W	Windsor	Queenpost through truss
Thetford Center Covered Bridge	Thetford Center Covered Bridge		1974-09-17	Thetford; 43°49′55″N 72°15′12″W	Orange	Haupt patent truss
Union Village Covered Bridge	Union Village Covered Bridge	1867	1974-09-17	Thetford; 43°47′19″N 72°15′17″W	Orange	multiple Kingpost truss
Upper Cox Brook Covered Bridge		1872	1974-10-01	Northfield; 44°10′25″N 72°39′20″W	Washington	Queenpost truss
Upper Falls Covered Bridge	Upper Falls Covered Bridge	ca. 1870	1973-08-28	Perkinsville; 43°23′55″N 72°31′21″W	Windsor	Town lattice truss
Village Covered Bridge		ca. 1877	1974-12-16	Waterville; 44°41′24″N 72°46′16″W	Lamoille	
Warren Covered Bridge		1879, 1880	1974-08-07	Warren; 44°6′40″N 72°51′26″W	Washington	Queenpost truss
Waterman Covered Bridge	Waterman Covered Bridge	1868	1974-06-13	Johnson; 44°36′33″N 72°41′4″W	Lamoille	Queenpost trusses; collapsed in 1982 and demolished
West Dummerston Covered Bridge	West Dummerston Covered Bridge	1872	1973-05-08	Dummerston; 42°56′12″N 72°36′49″W	Windham	Town lattice truss
West Hartford Bridge	West Hartford Bridge (modern replacement)	1929	1992-10-29	Hartford; 43°42′44″N 72°25′6″W	Windsor	Parker Through Truss; replaced in 2006
West Hill Covered Bridge	West Hill Covered Bridge	1860, 1890	1974-12-31	Montgomery; 44°52′3″N 72°38′53″W	Franklin	Town lattice
West Milton Bridge		1902	1992-09-08	Milton; 44°37′56″N 73°10′18″W	Chittenden	Double-span through truss Removed. Moved to site of former Swanton Covered Railroad Bridge.
West Townshend Stone Arch Bridge	West Townshend Stone Arch Bridge	ca. 1910	1977-04-18	West Townshend; 43°5′3″N 72°42′36″W	Windham	
West Woodstock Bridge	West Woodstock Bridge	1900	1992-08-27	West Woodstock; 43°36′51″N 72°32′36″W	Windsor	Pennsylvania through truss
Willard Covered Bridge	Willard Covered Bridge	ca. 1870	1973-08-28	Hartland; 43°35′37″N 72°21′1″W	Windsor	Town lattice truss
Williams River Route 5 Bridge	Williams River Route 5 Bridge	1929	1991-11-14	Rockingham; 43°10′57″N 72°27′36″W	Windham	Warren deck truss bridge
Williamsville Covered Bridge	Williamsville Covered Bridge	ca. 1870	1973-08-14	Newfane; 42°56′34″N 72°41′17″W	Windham	Town lattice truss
Winooski River Bridge	Winooski River Bridge	1929	1990-05-30	Richmond; 44°25′24″N 73°1′1″W	Chittenden	Pennsylvania through truss
Woodstock Warren Through Truss Bridge		ca. 1925	1992-08-18	Woodstock; 43°36′1″N 72°35′22″W	Windsor	Warren through truss; swept away by Hurricane Irene
Worrall Covered Bridge		1870	1973-07-16	Rockingham; 43°12′42″N 72°32′9″W	Windham	Town lattice truss

== See also ==
- List of covered bridges in Vermont
- List of non-authentic covered bridges in Vermont
