= Brave Little State of Vermont speech =

1928 remarks by U.S. President Calvin Coolidge

Detail of Coolidge's Brave Little State of Vermont speech inscribed in marble at the Hall of Inscriptions of the Vermont State House.

The Brave Little State of Vermont speech is a name given to remarks delivered by Vermont native and U.S. President Calvin Coolidge at Bennington on September 21, 1928. Coolidge was touring his home state by train to assess progress of recovery following the devastating 1927 flood. Considered taciturn and nicknamed "Silent Cal," Coolidge demonstrated unusual emotion in delivering his extemporaneous response to the human suffering and loss he had witnessed.

Text of Coolidge's remarks follow:

My fellow Vermonters:

For two days we have been traveling through this state. We have been up the East side, across and down the West side. We have seen Brattleboro, Bellows Falls, Windsor, White River Junction and Bethel. We have looked toward Montpelier. We have visited Burlington and Middlebury. Returning we have seen Rutland.

I have had an opportunity of visiting again the scenes of my childhood. I want to express to you, and through the press to the other cities of Vermont, my sincere appreciation for the general hospitality bestowed upon me and my associates on the occasion of this journey.

It is gratifying to note the splendid recovery from the great catastrophe which overtook the state nearly a year ago. Transportation has been restored. The railroads are in a better condition than before. The highways are open to traffic for those who wish to travel by automobile.

Vermont is a state I love. I could not look upon the peaks of Ascutney, Killington, Mansfield, and Equinox, without being moved in a way that no other scene could move me. It was here that I first saw the light of day; here I received my bride, here my dead lie pillowed on the loving breast of our everlasting hills.

I love Vermont because of her hills and valleys, her scenery and invigorating climate, but most of all because of her indomitable people. They are a race of pioneers who have almost beggared themselves to serve others. If the spirit of liberty should vanish in other parts of the Union, and support of our institutions should languish, it could all be replenished from the generous store held by the people of this brave little state of Vermont.

Coolidge's remarks were well received at Bennington and in the following days as his remarks were published in Vermont newspapers. The last line, "this brave little state of Vermont," received the most notice, and became a popular moniker for the state, showing up in speeches and toasts by Democrats and Republicans alike. It was echoed by many in the wake of disastrous floods caused by Hurricane Irene in 2011. The last four lines of the speech can be found incised in marble in the Hall of Inscriptions at the Vermont State House. The speech is also inscribed at his birthplace, the Calvin Coolidge Homestead District in Plymouth Notch.
