= Spaulding Bridge =

- U.S. National Register of Historic Places
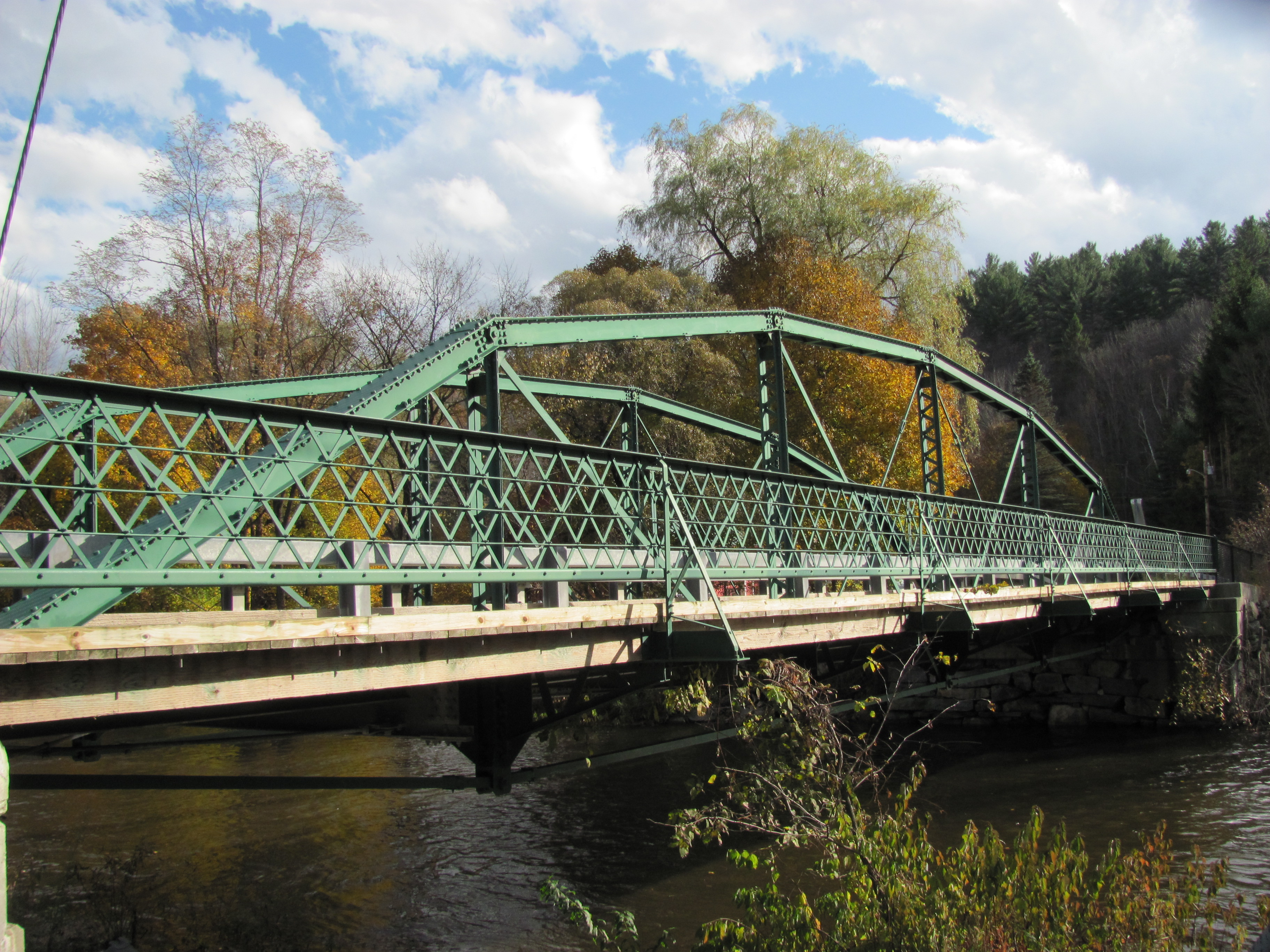

- Location within Vermont Location within the United States
- Location: Mill St., Cavendish, Vermont
- Coordinates: 43°22′57″N 72°36′31″W
- Area: less than one acre
- Built: 1905
- Built by: Norton, Henry
- Architectural style: Parker pony truss
- MPS: Metal Truss, Masonry, and Concrete Bridges in Vermont MPS
- NRHP reference No.: 05001522
- Added to NRHP: January 11, 2006

The Spaulding Bridge is a historic Parker pony truss bridge carrying Mill Street across the Black River in Cavendish, Vermont. Built in 1905, it is one of the state's few surviving examples of a metal truss bridge built before state aid and standardization of bridge types became widespread in Vermont. It was listed on the National Register of Historic Places in 2006.

== Description and history ==
The Spaulding Bridge is located just south of the village center of Cavendish, carrying Mill Street toward points south of the village. It is a single-span Parker pony truss, 98 feet 6 inches (30.02 m) in length, with a width of 16 feet 8 inches (5.08 m). A sidewalk is carried by outriggers from the main bridge stringers on one side. It is built out of I-beams, plates, and flanges, connected by pins. The trusses are set on stone abutments that have been faced in concrete.

The bridge was built for the town in 1905 by Henry Norton, and was dedicated to Gilbert and Olive Spaulding. It is one of a small number of surviving pin-connected truss bridges in the state; this style of construction was already falling out of fashion when this bridge was built, replaced by field riveting. The bridge underwent a major restoration in 2005.

== See also ==
- National Register of Historic Places listings in Windsor County, Vermont
- List of bridges on the National Register of Historic Places in Vermont
