= Ottauquechee River Bridge =

- U.S. National Register of Historic Places
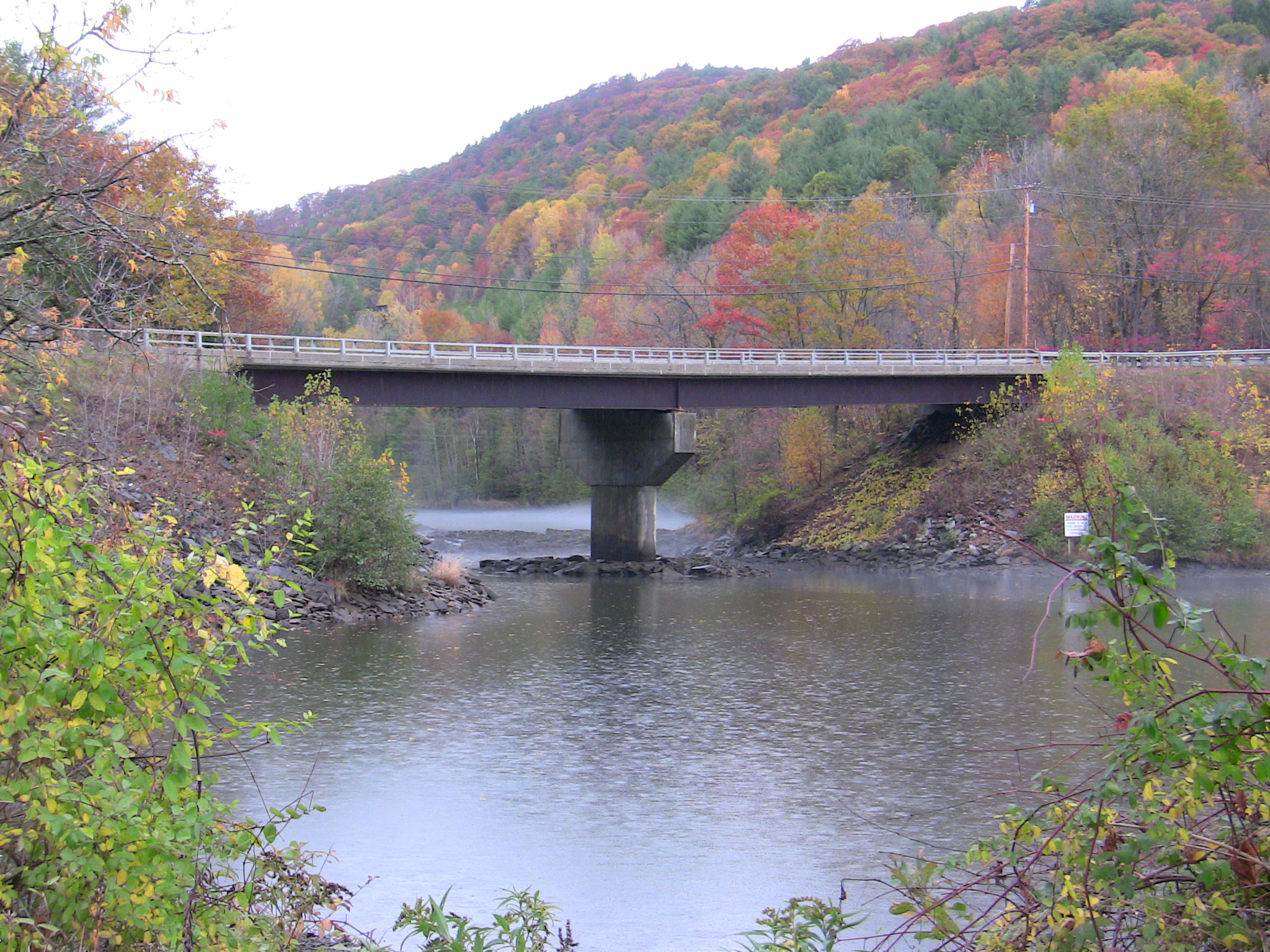
- The replacement steel girder bridge, 2014

- Location within Vermont
- Location: US 5 over the Ottauquechee R., Hartland, Vermont
- Coordinates: 43°36′9″N 72°21′17″W
- Area: less than one acre
- Built: 1930
- Architectural style: Warren deck truss bridge
- MPS: Metal Truss, Masonry, and Concrete Bridges in Vermont MPS
- NRHP reference No.: 90001491
- Added to NRHP: October 11, 1990

The Ottauquechee River Bridge is a steel girder bridge carrying United States Route 5 across the Ottauquechee River in Hartland, Vermont. The bridge replaced a c. 1930 Warren deck truss bridge, built in the wake of Vermont's devastating 1927 floods, and listed on the National Register of Historic Places in 1990.

== Location ==
The bridge is located in a rural section of northern Hartland, spanning the Ottauquechee River a short way downstream from the North Hartland Dam. United States Route 5 is a major roadway providing local access along the Connecticut River, and is roughly paralleled by Interstate 91 to the east.

== Historic bridge ==
The bridge built in 1930 was a four-span structure, mounted on concrete piers and abutments. The piers featured rusticated and rounded ends, with an arch between the I-beam spans on the northernmost pier. It measured 274 feet (84 m) in length, with three approach spans made of steel I-beams and a main span of Warren trusses measuring 120 feet (37 m). The guardrail was composed of T-shaped stanchions connected by decorative metal latticework. One of 1,600 bridges constructed by the state following the 1927 floods, it was also one of only four Warren deck truss structures built at that time. When the bridge was listed on the National Register in 1990, a nearly identical bridge stood in Bethel, spanning a branch of the White River.

== See also ==
- National Register of Historic Places listings in Windsor County, Vermont
- List of bridges on the National Register of Historic Places in Vermont
