= Kedron Brook Bridge =

- U.S. National Register of Historic Places
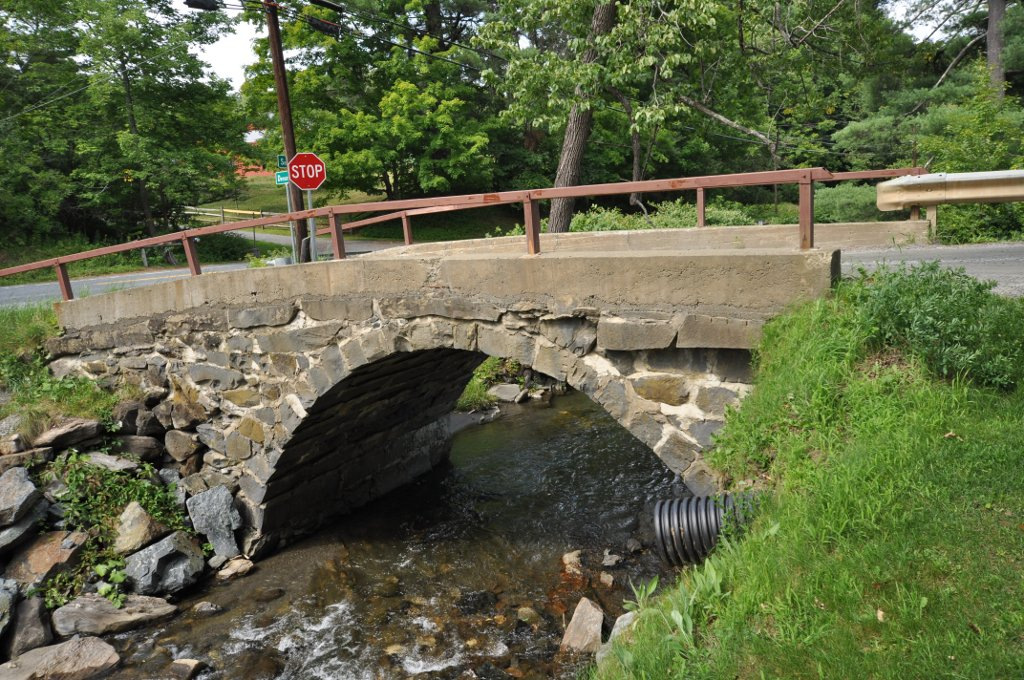

- Location within Vermont Location within the United States
- Location: Town Hwy. 65 (Densmore Hill Rd.) over Kedron Brook, Woodstock, Vermont
- Coordinates: 43°34′53″N 72°30′55″W
- Area: less than one acre
- Built: 1810
- Architectural style: Masonry arch bridge
- MPS: Metal Truss, Masonry, and Concrete Bridges in Vermont MPS
- NRHP reference No.: 92001037
- Added to NRHP: August 27, 1992

The Kedron Brook Bridge is a historic stone arch bridge, carrying Densmore Hill Road across Kedron Brook in southern Woodstock, Vermont. Built about 1810, it is one of the state's older stone bridges, built from locally gathered stone. It was listed on the National Register of Historic Places in 1992.

== Description and history ==
The Kedron Brook Bridge is located in a rural residential area of southern Woodstock, just east of the junction of Densmore Hill Road and Vermont Route 106. The bridge is a small single-span structure, 14 feet (4.3 m) wide and 22 feet (6.7 m) long, rising to about 9 feet (2.7 m) above Kedron Brook. The edges of the bridge are lined with a low concrete curb, on which a simple wooden railing has been mounted. (At the time of its National Register listing, it still had apparently original metal stanchions with yokes; these have since been removed.) The bridge's arch is fashioned out of irregularly shaped stone, which is predominantly granite, but includes other stone types commonly found in the vicinity. The exterior surfaces of the stone have been worked to some degree, and the gaps have been pointed with sandy mortar.

This bridge was built about 1810, and is of a type that were once quite common in the state, and were typically found in clusters where skilled stonemasons lived. The critical elements of the arch would have been built by such a mason, while the rubble fill and other elements of the work would have been done by lesser skilled labor. This bridge, while significantly older, is stylistically similar to the early 20th-century bridges of James Otis Follett, found in the Townshend area of Windham County.

== See also ==
- National Register of Historic Places listings in Windsor County, Vermont
- List of bridges on the National Register of Historic Places in Vermont
