= Bridge 26 =

- U.S. National Register of Historic Places
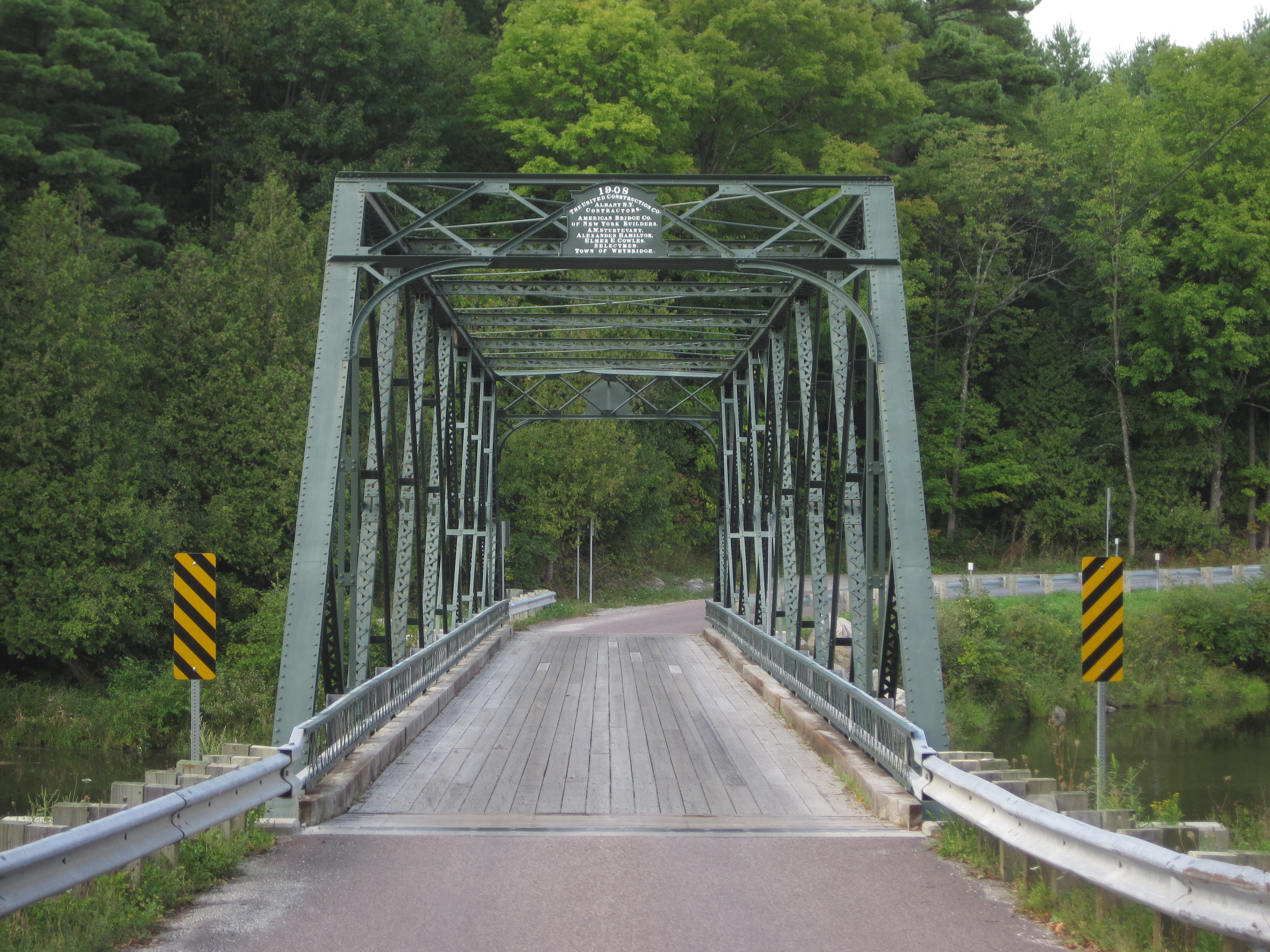

- Location within Vermont Location within the United States
- Location: Morgan Horse Farm Rd, over the Otter Cr., Weybridge and New Haven, Vermont
- Coordinates: 44°4′23″N 73°11′39″W
- Area: less than one acre
- Built: 1908
- Built by: American Bridge Company; United Construction Co.
- Architectural style: Riveted lattice truss
- MPS: Metal Truss, Masonry, and Concrete Bridges in Vermont MPS
- NRHP reference No.: 06000488
- Added to NRHP: June 7, 2006

The New Haven-Weybridge Rattling Bridge is a historic bridge spanning Otter Creek between the Vermont towns of Weybridge and New Haven. It connects Town Highway 7 (Pearson Road) in New Haven with Town Highway 11 (Morgan Horse Farm Road) in Weybridge. Built in 1908 by the American Bridge Company, it is a well-preserved example of a rivet-connected lattice truss bridge. It was listed on the National Register of Historic Places as Bridge 26 in 2006.

== Description and history ==
The New Haven-Weybridge Rattling Bridge is located in southwestern New Haven and northeastern Weybridge, where the town border is defined by Otter Creek. It is oriented north–south, and crosses the river just east of the Huntington Falls dam. It is a single-span metal truss, in a style sometimes called a double-intersection Warren truss, but in a style more similar to that of a Whipple truss. It is 149 feet (45 m) long and has a roadway width of 16 feet (4.9 m) (one lane). Its end portals are 16 feet 6 inches (5.03 m) at the center, and have rounded corners. The structural elements of the trusses are joined by rivets. The bridge derives its name from loosely laid deck boards, which rattled when they were driven on.

The bridge was built in 1908 by the American Bridge Company, as part of a program begun in 1892 by the state to improve its transport infrastructure. The road which it carries was originally the Waltham Pike, opened in 1808, which was the first road to traverse the town of Weybridge. Construction of the bridge was principally funded by the town of Weybridge; it is now co-owned and maintained by the two towns.

== See also ==
- National Register of Historic Places listings in Addison County, Vermont
- List of bridges on the National Register of Historic Places in Vermont
