= South Street Bridge (Poultney, Vermont) =

- Bridge 4
- U.S. National Register of Historic Places
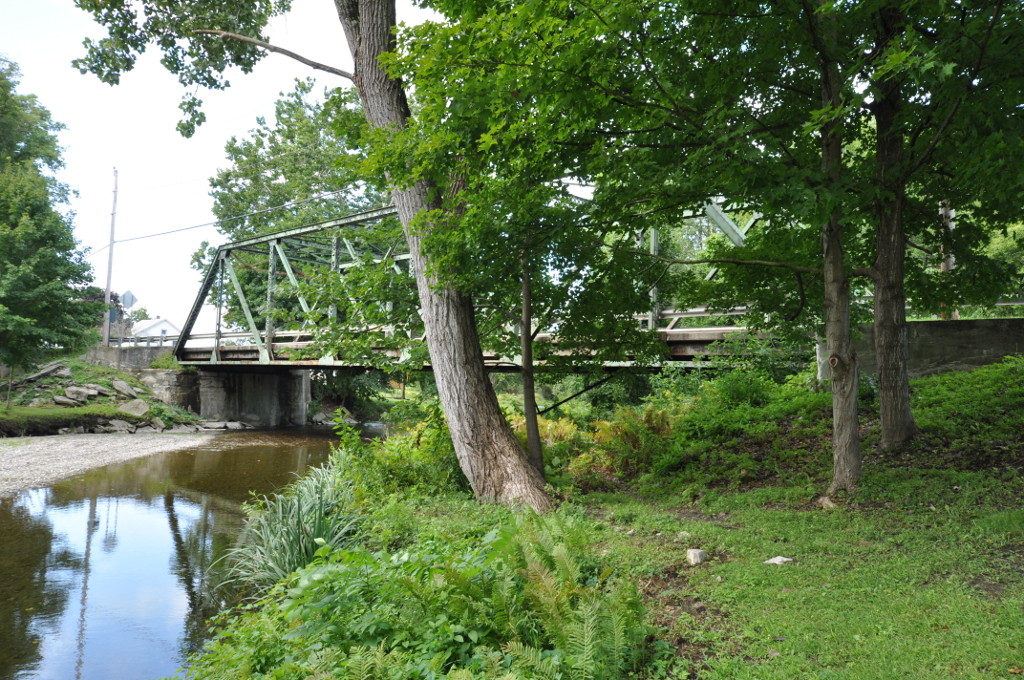

- Location within Vermont Location within the United States
- Location: Vermont Route 31, Poultney, Vermont
- Coordinates: 43°30′47″N 73°14′2″W
- Area: less than one acre
- Built: 1923
- Built by: Palmer Steel Co.
- Architect: Frank Garran
- Architectural style: Pratt truss bridge
- MPS: Metal Truss, Masonry, and Concrete Bridges in Vermont MPS
- NRHP reference No.: 09000892
- Added to NRHP: November 5, 2009

The South Street Bridge is a historic Pratt truss bridge, carrying Vermont Route 31 across the Poultney River just south of the village center of Poultney, Vermont. Built in 1923, it is one of a small number of surviving Pratt through trusses in the state, and one of just three that survives from the period before the state's devastating 1927 floods. It was listed on the National Register of Historic Places in 2009 as Bridge 4.

== Description and history ==
Vermont Route 31 is the major roadway leading south from the village of Poultney in western Vermont. Starting as Grove Street in the village center, it crosses the Poultney River on this bridge, and is known in the southern portion as South Street. The bridge is oriented north-south, and the river flows roughly westward, eventually forming the state line with neighboring New York before emptying into Lake Champlain. The bridge is a typical single-span Pratt through truss structure, with a span of 126 feet (38 m), and rests on abutments of poured concrete with large boulders mixed in. There is a sidewalk cantilevered outside the downstream truss, and the roadway width is 21 feet (6.4 m) (two lanes).

The bridge was designed in 1922 by Frank Garran, a state engineer, to conform to standards enacted by the state in 1921, and was completed in 1923. Its trusses were fabricated by the Palmer Steel Company of Holyoke, Massachusetts. The bridge was paid for by state and local funds. At the time of its construction, most state-funded bridges were still built as concrete deck bridges, and the use of trusses was still a developing strategy, which would be greatly accelerated by the massive flooding the state experienced in 1927.

== See also ==
- National Register of Historic Places listings in Rutland County, Vermont
- List of bridges on the National Register of Historic Places in Vermont
