= Bridgewater Corners Bridge =

- U.S. National Register of Historic Places
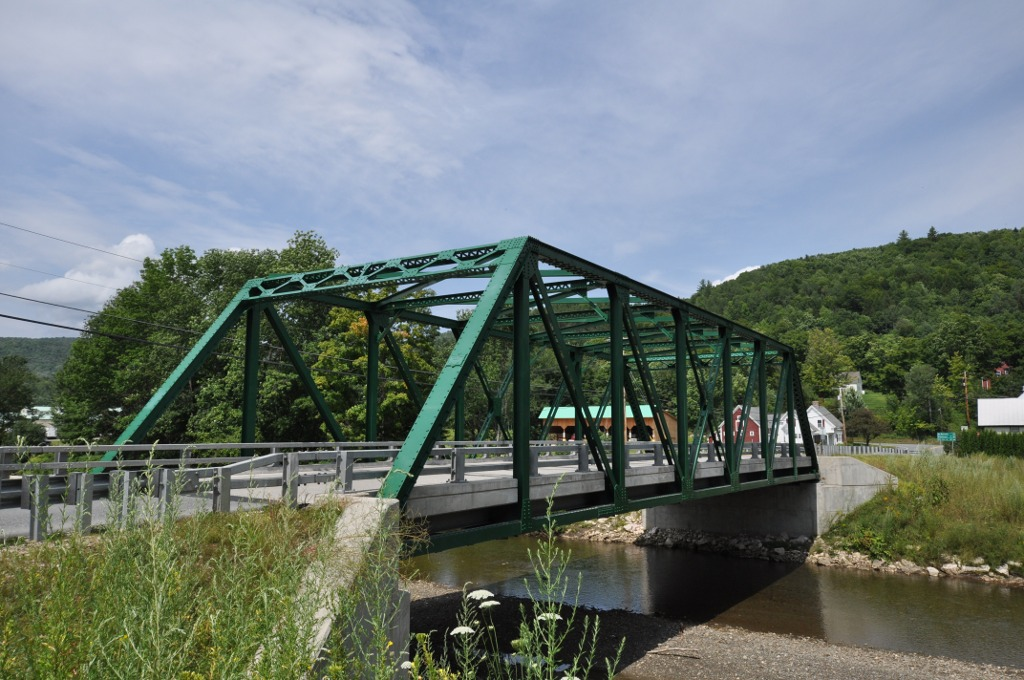

- Location within Vermont Location within the United States
- Location: VT 100A over the Ottauquechee R., Bridgewater, Vermont
- Coordinates: 43°35′12″N 72°39′25″W
- Area: less than one acre
- Built: 1928
- Built by: American Bridge Co.
- Architectural style: Pratt Through Truss Bridge
- MPS: Metal Truss, Masonry, and Concrete Bridges in Vermont MPS
- NRHP reference No.: 92001525
- Added to NRHP: October 29, 1992

The Bridgewater Corners Bridge carries Vermont Route 100A across the Ottauquechee River in the Bridgewater Corners village of Bridgewater, Vermont. It was built in 1928 by the American Bridge Company, following devastating flooding. It is a single-span Pratt through truss structure, and was listed on the National Register of Historic Places in 1992.

== Description and history ==
The Bridgewater Corners Bridge stands just south of United States Route 4 on Route 100A, and just east of the Long Trail Brewing Company plant. It is a single-span Pratt through truss, 111 feet (34 m) in length and 21.6 feet (6.6 m) in width, resting on rusticated poured concrete abutments. It carries the road about 15 feet (4.6 m) above the river, and has a portal clearance of 15.1 feet (4.6 m). The truss elements are of lighter weight than other bridges of the period, and its trusses are fastened by rivets. The deck is corrugated metal, supported by rolled I-beams.

The state of Vermont was devastated by flooding in 1927, which destroyed a large number of bridges. This bridge was built the following year by the American Bridge Company, and is based on a standardized design used for many of the bridges built in the period. It deviates from these in being shorter than typical for Pratt through trusses, and in its use of lighter-weight materials.

== See also ==
- National Register of Historic Places listings in Windsor County, Vermont
- List of bridges on the National Register of Historic Places in Vermont
