= Medburyville Bridge =

- U.S. National Register of Historic Places
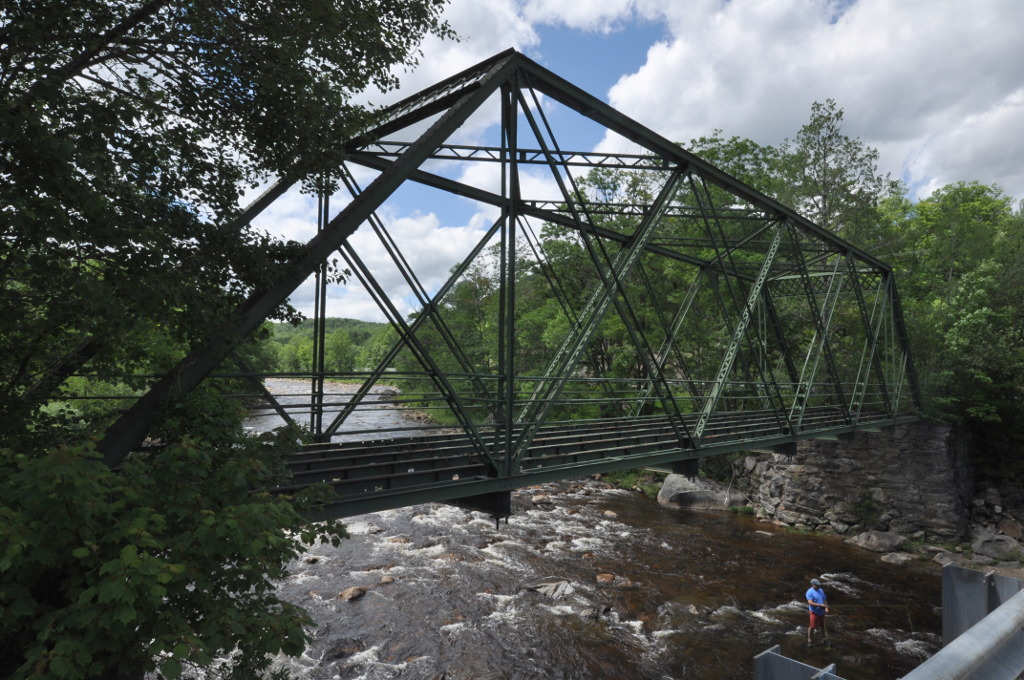

- Location within Vermont Location within the United States
- Location: Town Hwy. 31 over the Deerfield River, Wilmington, Vermont
- Coordinates: 42°52′16″N 72°55′12″W
- Area: less than one acre
- Built: 1896
- Built by: Vermont Construction Co.
- Architectural style: Warren through truss
- MPS: Metal Truss, Masonry, and Concrete Bridges in Vermont MPS
- NRHP reference No.: 90001746
- Added to NRHP: November 8, 1990

The Medburyville Bridge is a historic bridge in Wilmington, Vermont. It is a steel Warren through bridge, built in 1896 across the Deerfield River, just south of Vermont Route 9 roughly midway between the centers of Wilmington and Searsburg. It stands just upstream of the Woods Road bridge, which functionally replaced it in 1985. The bridge was listed on the National Register of Historic Places in 1990; as it has no decking, it is closed to all forms of traffic.

== Description and history ==
The Medburyville Bridge is a double-intersection steel Warren through truss bridge, a variant of the standard Warren patent in which two sets of triangular elements provide increased rigidity to the trusses. It was, at the time of its listing on the National Register, one of two such bridges in Vermont. It is 97 feet (30 m) long and has a nominal roadway width of 14.1 feet (4.3 m), although its decking has been taken up and only the supporting substructure is visible. Its portals have a clearance height of 14.8 feet (4.5 m), and the bridge deck is nominally about 17.5 feet (5.3 m) above the river. The bridge rests on uncoursed rubblestone abutments.

According to town records, just over $1500 was spent on a bridge in Medburyville in 1896. The builder was the Vermont Construction Company, the state's first fabricator of metal truss bridges. At the time, the state had not yet standardized on bridge designs, so the choice of design was probably made by the town. The bridge survived the state's massive 1927 floods, and continued in active service until 1985, when the bridge just downstream was built. The town turned ownership of the bridge over to the state, whose historic preservation commission is responsible for its maintenance.

== See also ==
- National Register of Historic Places listings in Windham County, Vermont
- List of bridges on the National Register of Historic Places in Vermont
