= Chamberlin Mill Covered Bridge =

Bridge in Lyndon, Vermont, US

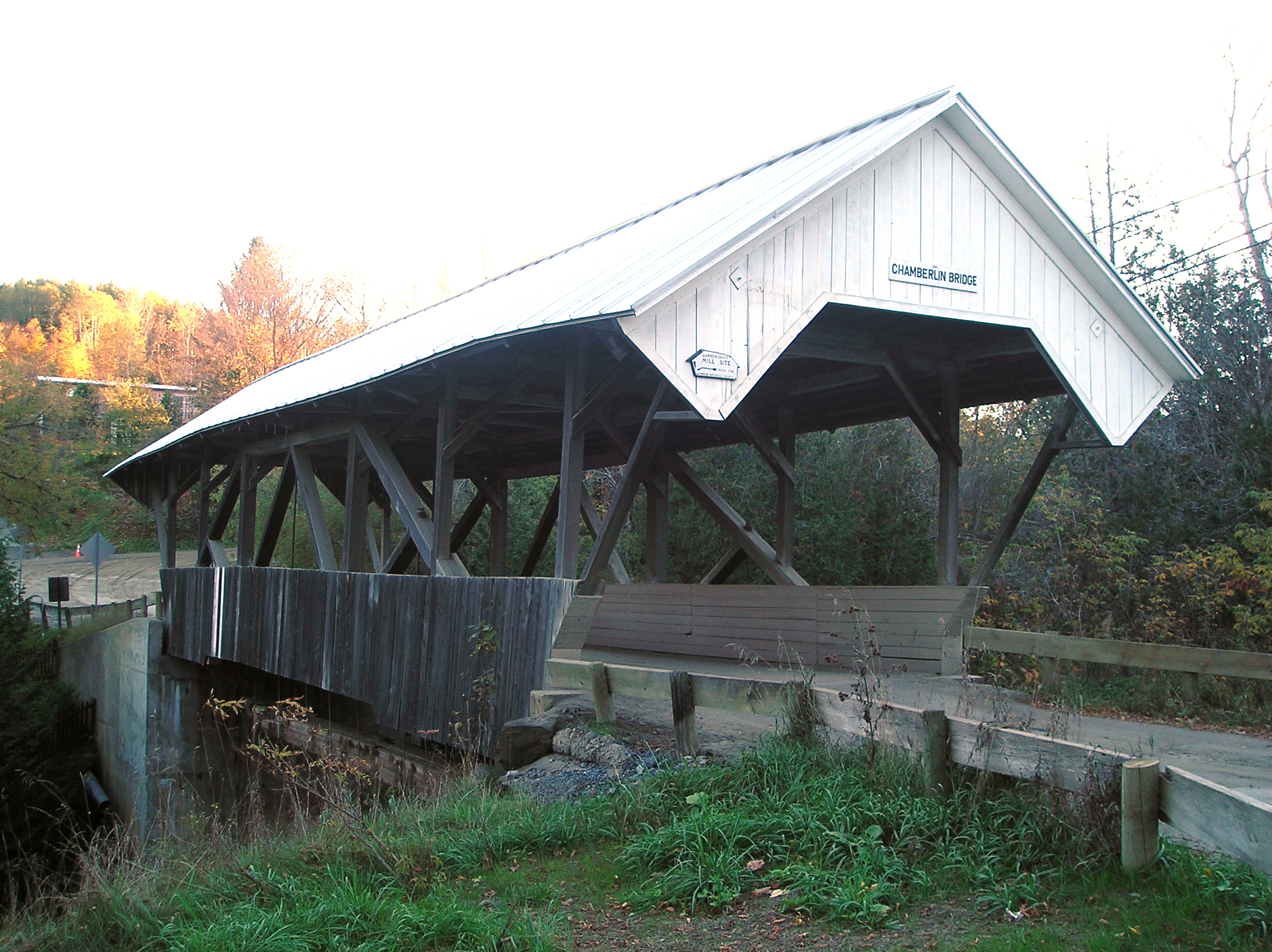
- Bridge in U.S. state of Vermont
- Coordinates: 44°30′57″N 72°0′36″W
- Crosses: South Wheelock Branch of Passumpsic River
- Locale: Lyndon, Vermont
- Other name(s): Chamberlin Covered Bridge; Whitcomb Covered Bridge
- ID number: VT-03-04

Characteristics
- Design: Covered, Queenpost truss
- Total length: 69 ft (21.03 m)
- Width: 16 ft 6 in (5.03 m)
- No. of spans: 1

History
- Construction end: 1881
- Chamberlin Mill Covered Bridge
- U.S. National Register of Historic Places
- Area: 1 acre (0.40 ha)
- Architectural style: queenpost truss
- NRHP reference No.: 74000205
- Added to NRHP: July 30, 1974

Location
- Interactive map of Chamberlin Mill Covered Bridge

The Chamberlin (or Chamberlain) Mill Covered Bridge, also called Chamberlin Covered Bridge or Whitcomb Covered Bridge, is a historic covered bridge that carries Chamberlain Bridge Road across the South Wheelock Branch of the Passumpsic River in Lyndon, Vermont. Built in 1881, it is one of five similar area bridges. It was listed on the National Register of Historic Places in 1974.

== Description and history ==
The Chamberlin Mill Covered Bridge is located in a rural-residential area of south-central Lyndon, carrying Chamberlain Bridge Road, a north-south connector between York Street and South Wheelock Road west of United States Route 5. The bridge is a single-span queenpost truss structure, 69 feet (21.0 m) long and 16 feet 6 inches (5.03 m) wide on the inside. It is covered by a metal gabled roof with very long eaves, and rests on stone abutments. Vertical boarding is applied to the lower third of its sides, and also to the portal ends. The portals project beyond the trusses, and their sheathing is flared at sides to reach the eaves. The trusses include iron suspension rods, and are joined at the top by lateral tie rods for stability. The bridge deck consists of wooden planking.

The bridge's construction date is unknown. It was mentioned in a newspaper in 1881, at which time discussion was ongoing whether or not to cover it, suggesting it was originally built without a roof. The bridge is one of five surviving 19th-century covered bridges in Lyndon, all of which exhibit similar construction features. A sixth bridge in adjacent Danville also has similar features.

== See also ==
- National Register of Historic Places listings in Caledonia County, Vermont
- List of Vermont covered bridges
- List of bridges on the National Register of Historic Places in Vermont
