= Middlebury River =

River in Addison County, Vermont, United States

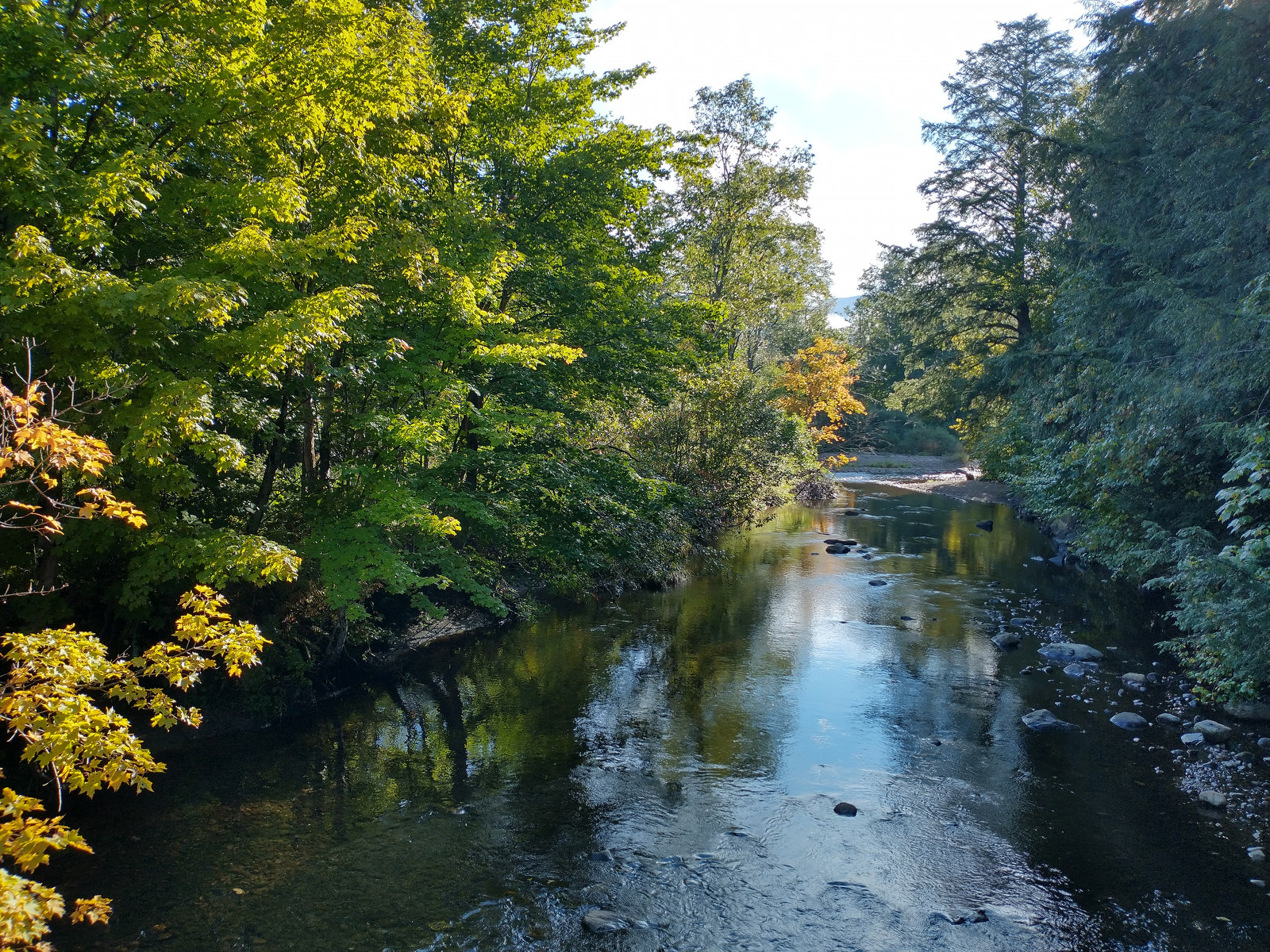
- Middlebury River in 2021

Location
- Country: United States
- State: Vermont

Physical characteristics
- Mouth: Otter River
  - coordinates: 43.9695°N 73.1568°W
- Length: 18.2 m (60 ft)
- Basin size: 62.8 square miles

The Middlebury River is a tributary river of Otter Creek in Addison County, Vermont. Three branches feed

the river from origins in Green Mountain National Forest. The river is 18.6 miles (29.9 km) long, has a watershed of 62.8 square miles (163 km^{2}), and is located southeast of Lake Champlain. The river passes through Ripton, Middlebury and Salisbury.
