= Brookline, Vermont =

- Town
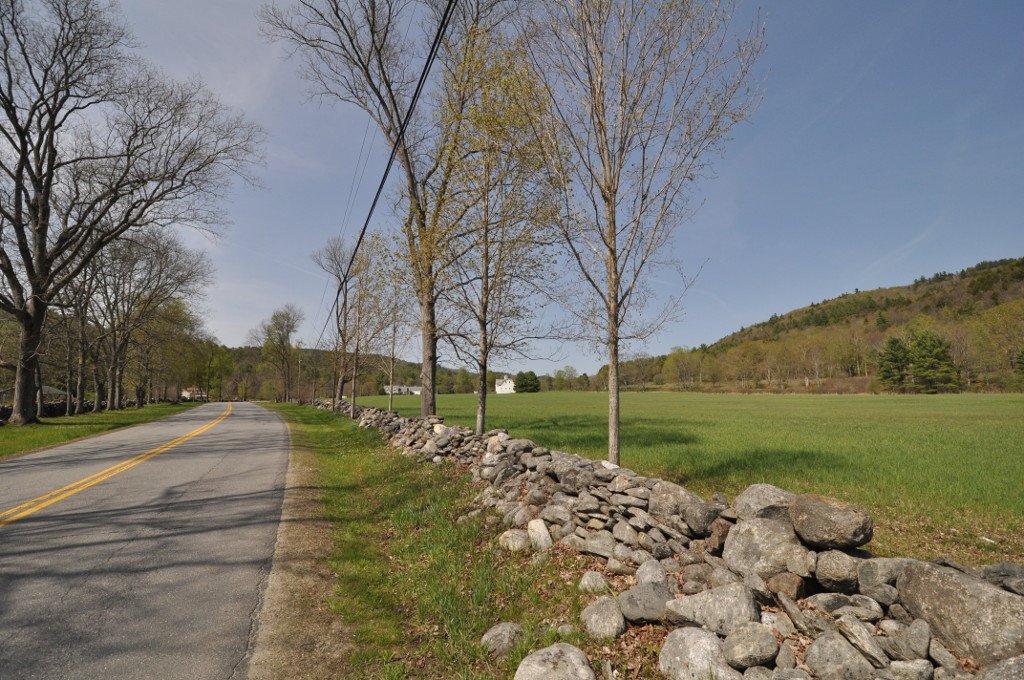
- View of the Grassy Brook valley in Brookline

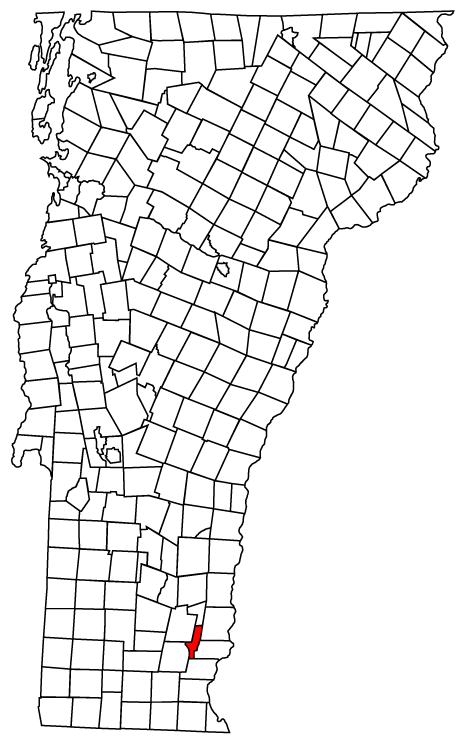
- Brookline, Vermont
- Coordinates: 43°00′16″N 72°37′40″W
- Country: United States
- State: Vermont
- County: Windham
- Settled: 1777
- Incorporated: 1794

Area
  - Total: 12.9 sq mi (33.4 km^{2})
  - Land: 12.9 sq mi (33.4 km^{2})
  - Water: 0 sq mi (0.0 km^{2})
- Elevation: 620 ft (190 m)

Population (2020)
  - Total: 540
  - Density: 42/sq mi (16.2/km^{2})
- Time zone: UTC-5 (Eastern (EST))
  - Summer (DST): UTC-4 (EDT)
- ZIP code: 05345
- Area code: 802
- FIPS code: 50-09475
- GNIS feature ID: 1462055
- Website: brooklinevt.com

Brookline is a town in Windham County, Vermont, United States. The population was 540 at the 2020 census.

== Geography ==
According to the United States Census Bureau, the town has a total area of 12.9 square miles (33.4 km^{2}), all land. The West River flows along the southwestern boundary of the town.

== Demographics ==
Historical population
Census	Pop.	Note	%±
1800	472		—
1810	431		−8.7%
1820	391		−9.3%
1830	376		−3.8%
1840	328		−12.8%
1850	285		−13.1%
1860	243		−14.7%
1870	203		−16.5%
1880	205		1.0%
1890	162		−21.0%
1900	171		5.6%
1910	137		−19.9%
1920	105		−23.4%
1930	101		−3.8%
1940	104		3.0%
1950	132		26.9%
1960	127		−3.8%
1970	180		41.7%
1980	310		72.2%
1990	403		30.0%
2000	467		15.9%
2010	530		13.5%
2020	540		1.9%
U.S. Decennial Census

As of the census of 2000, there were 467 people and 124 families residing in the town. The population density was 36.2 people per square mile (14.0/km^{2}). There were 274 housing units at an average density of 21.2 per square mile (8.2/km^{2}). The racial makeup of the town was 99.36% White, 0.21% Native American, 0.43% from other races. Hispanic or Latino of any race were 0.64% of the population.

There were 186 households, out of which 34.4% had children under the age of 18 living with them, 59.1% were married couples living together, 4.8% had a female householder with no husband present, and 32.8% were non-families. 23.1% of all households were made up of individuals, and 9.1% had someone living alone who was 65 years of age or older. The average household size was 2.51 and the average family size was 3.00.

27.2% of the population were under the age of 18, 4.5% were 18 to 24, 29.8% were 25 to 44, 27.8% were 45 to 64, and 10.7% were 65 years of age or older. The median age was 39 years. For every 100 females, there were 97.9 males. For every 100 females age 18 and over, there were 93.2 males.

The median income for a household in the town was $39,125, and the median income for a family was $44,375. Males had a median income of $31,094 versus $20,893 for females. The per capita income for the town was $18,082. About 5.0% of families and 8.5% of the population were below the poverty line, including 10.6% of those under age 18 and 11.7% of those age 65 or over.
