= Great Vermont Flood of 1927 =

Flood in Vermont caused by heavy rainfall in November

1927 New England floods
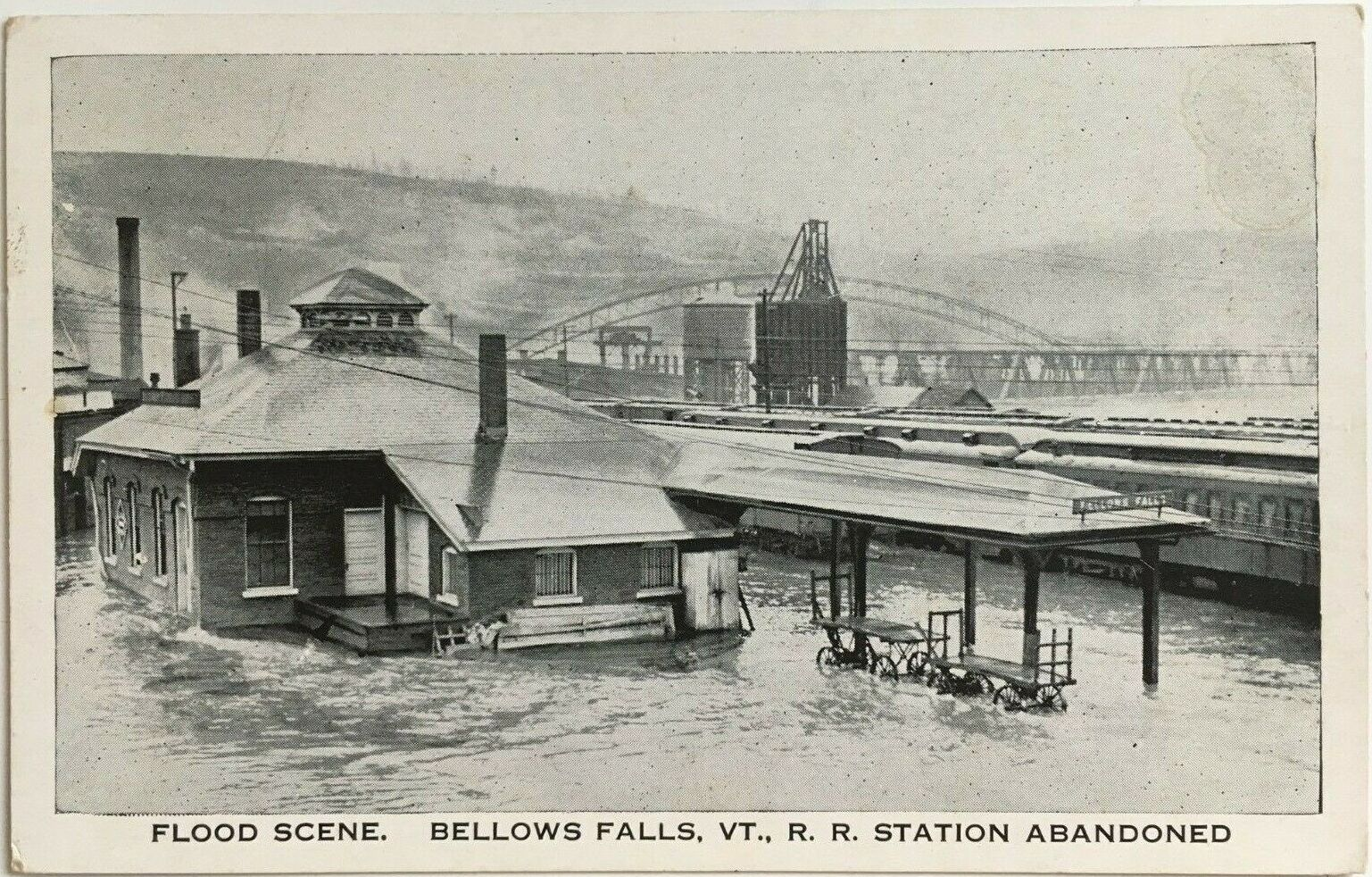
- The train station in Bellows Falls, Vermont depicted on a postcard after the Great Flood of 1927
- Date: November 2–4, 1927
- Location: Vermont, and bordering regions in New England
- Deaths: 85 deaths (84 in Vermont)
- Property damage: $50 million (1927 USD)

The Great Flood of 1927 was a flooding event in Vermont, and some parts of the bordering states. In early November 1927, heavy rainfall across New England caused extensive and destructive flooding. Vermont experienced the majority of the damage. A total of 85 people died and damage exceeded $50 million.

Following a very wet October, record levels of rainfall fell in early November. The U.S. Geological Survey estimated 53% of the state received more than six inches of rain, (the greatest recorded amount being 9.86 inches (250 mm) in Somerset) which caused rivers throughout the state to flood. The flood is considered the worst flood in Vermont, with the only comparisons being the floods caused by Hurricane Irene in 2011 and those of July 2023.

== Background ==
During the month of October, rainfall statewide averaged about 150 percent of normal, but in the northern and central sections of the state, some weather stations received 200–300 percent of normal. Heavy rainfall periods during the month were sufficiently separated that flooding did not occur, but the soil became saturated. Combined with the lateness of the year and the fact that most vegetation was either in, or near, seasonal dormancy, any further rainfall would run off directly into the rivers.

== Flood ==
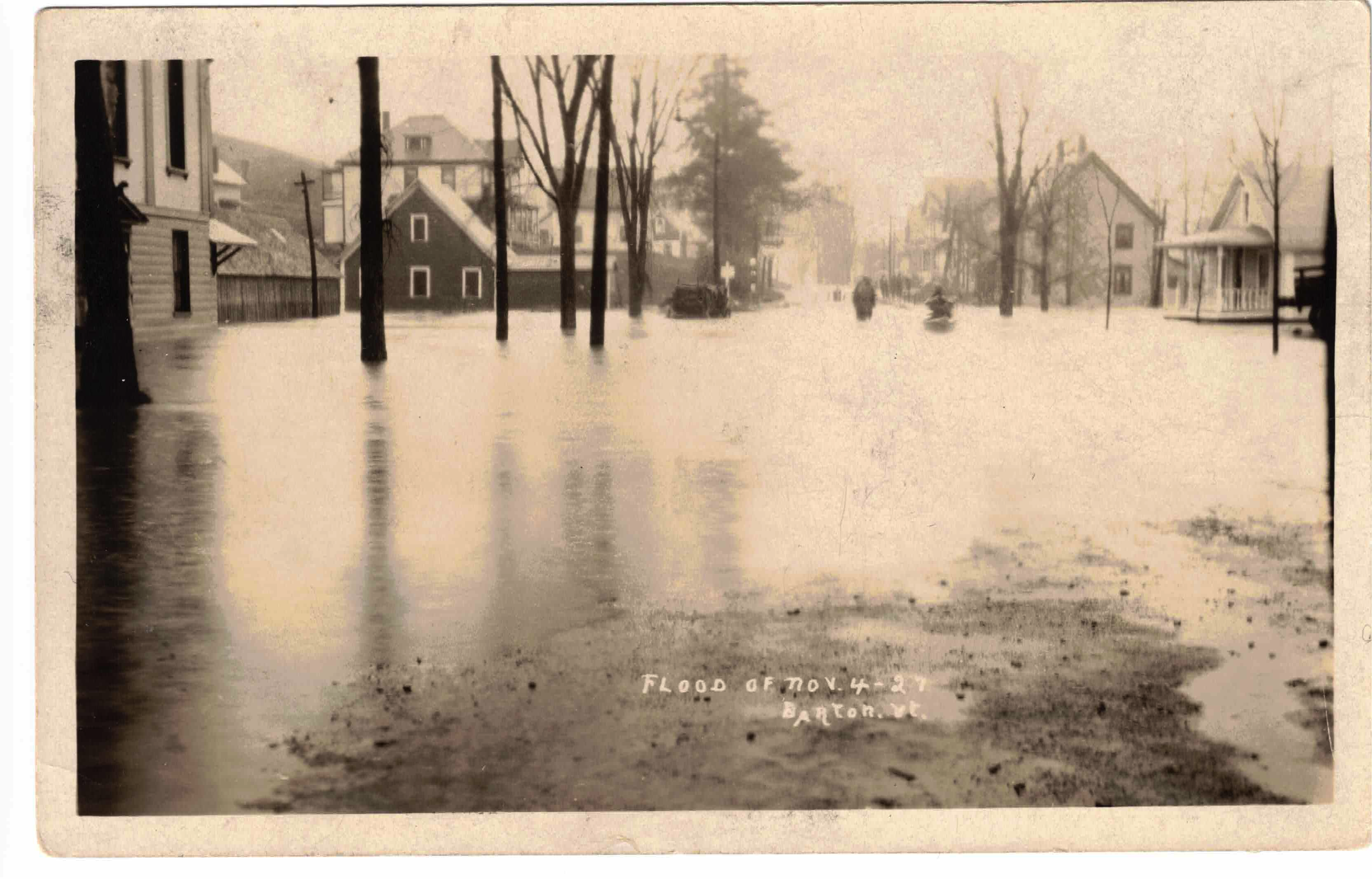
Postcard depicting the flood on November 4, 1927 in Barton, Vermont

Rain began to fall on the evening of November 2, as a cold front moved into the area from the west. Rainfall continued through the night with light amounts being recorded by the morning of the 3rd. Rainfall intensity increased during the morning of the 3rd as a low pressure center moved up along the Northeast coast. This low had abundant moisture associated with the remnants of a tropical storm over the western Atlantic. As the low moved up the coast, a strong southeast air flow developed. This moisture-laden air was forced to rise as it encountered the Green Mountains, resulting in torrential downpours along and east of the mountains. Rainfall amounts at the Weather Bureau station in Northfield, for example, totaled 1.65 inches (42 mm) from 4 am to 11 am on the 3rd, with 4.24 inches (108 mm) falling from 11 am to 8 pm. The total from late evening of the 2nd to late morning on the 4th was 8.71 inches (221 mm).

== Aftermath ==
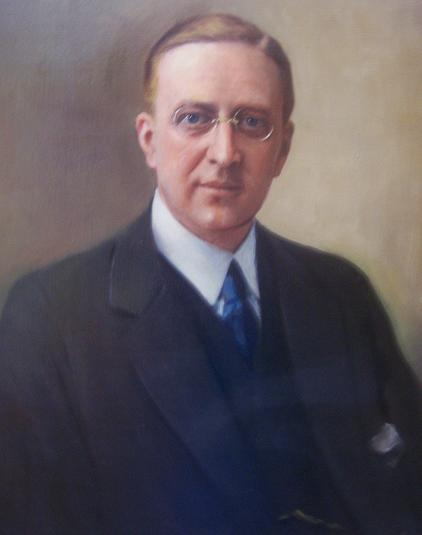
Lieutenant Governor Samuel Hollister Jackson of Vermont, 1927

The flood destroyed 1285 bridges and killed at least 84 people. Vermont's Lieutenant Governor Samuel Hollister Jackson died trying to escape his flooded car. Many buildings and infrastructure were also damaged. Environmental historians attribute a number of possible causes for the extreme flooding, including deforestation, saturation of the soil, and the lack of living greenery because of the fall season.

The flood is seen as a turning point in relations between the state government and town governments. Floodwaters destroyed and damaged many bridges which were the towns' responsibility to maintain and repair, but many towns lacked the resources to rebuild their bridges. The state government undertook the task and in so doing assumed a larger role in the statewide road system.

The next year, President Calvin Coolidge, a native of Vermont, toured the state. He saw how Vermont had recovered from the flood and delivered a speech in Bennington in which he observed: "I love Vermont because of her hills and valleys, her scenery and invigorating climate, but most of all because of her indomitable people". He concluded by praising "the people of this brave little state of Vermont".

H. P. Lovecraft's novella The Whisperer in Darkness (1931) begins with the Great Vermont Flood.

== See also ==
- Brave Little State of Vermont speech
- Great Mississippi Flood of 1927
