= List of covered bridges in Vermont =

Below is a list of covered bridges in Vermont. There are just over 100 authentic covered bridges in the U.S. state of Vermont, giving the state both the highest number of covered bridges per square mile and per capita in the United States, as well as North America overall. A covered bridge is considered authentic not due to its age, but by its construction. An authentic bridge is constructed using trusses rather than other methods such as stringers (a popular choice for non-authentic covered bridges). Most covered bridges in Vermont are made with local timber and adhere to vernacular adaptations of historically popular construction practices that once covered much of the eastern United States, and so no two of them are exactly alike. It's estimated that as many as 700 covered bridges may have existed across Vermont in the past, many of which perished or were replaced after the flood of 1927 and resulting New Deal era.

Vermont alone possesses more than half of the roughly 200 remaining historic covered bridges across the New England states, and the third most overall after Pennsylvania and Ohio. Almost all of the remaining bridges are treated as protected landmarks in their respective communities, tended to by local and state preservation organizations. Covered bridges are widely popular with locals and visitors alike and serve as tourist attractions and pride for their communities and Vermont overall, in addition to their genuine utility. Some are even used as components of swimming holes in the mountains and valleys of Vermont, such as the Grist Mill bridge in Cambridge. Covered bridges historically in some circles were referred to as "kissing bridges" during the more modest era of the late 19th Century, as the privacy from passing through a covered bridge would allow passengers in horse and buggy an opportunity to kiss each other unobserved, particularly for longer, one-laned bridges like the Cornish-Windsor. Many published and locally-recommended "covered bridge tours" post mapped out road directions to efficiently access areas with high concentrations of bridges; some people have visited every single bridge in the state through this strategy.

Vermont's geography is extremely rugged with dense woods crisscrossed by outposts of civilization along river valleys. This makes covered bridges ideal for providing year-round access to roads which would otherwise be impassable, as well as being historically easily constructed with local materials. Besides prolonging the lifespan of the wooden bridge structure significantly, as well as providing a stable 4-season crossing of a river, a bridge with a covering eventually also found popularity with farmers who found an unintended benefit in herding livestock such as cattle across bodies of water without startling them. As cows (and many horses) have evolved with an innate aversion to uneven terrain and moving water, a covered bridge would obscure the view of the swift-flowing river beneath them and allow the animal and its owner to cross unperturbed in any weather condition.

Montgomery possesses the most covered bridges of any municipality in Vermont, with seven. Other towns with high concentrations of bridges are Bennington, Lyndon, Rockingham, Northfield and (the aptly named) Tunbridge, all of which have five. Northfield additionally boasts the only road in the United States carried over three distinct 19th century covered bridges, as well as the only place where two can be observed from the same point, the upper, middle and lower Cox Brook Road bridges. Vermont also shares the longest 19th century covered bridge in the United States with New Hampshire, the Cornish-Windsor bridge straddling the Connecticut River. Additionally, every county in Vermont except for Grand Isle has at least one covered bridge. There is approximately one covered bridge every 92 square miles in Vermont, and one per every 6,172 of its residents. Many can and do carry vehicle traffic, but care must be taken to avoid driving vehicles that are overweight or overheight to prevent damage to the antiquated and load-bearing timber construction; some bridges are rated as low as 8,000 pounds GVW.

== List ==
Name	Image	County	Location	Built	Length	Crosses	Ownership	Truss Type
Spade Farm		Addison	Ferrisburgh; 44.237513°N 73.232095°W	1850	85'	storm drainage ditch	Private	Town lattice
Pulp Mill (Note: A rare two lane covered bridge.)		Addison	Middlebury; 44.024668°N 73.177485°W	1820	199'	Otter Creek on Seymour St	Towns	Burr Arch
Halpin (Note: Highest covered bridge from its waterway in Vermont.)		Addison	Middlebury; 44.050136°N 73.140846°W	1850	66.2'	Muddy Branch (of the New Haven River) on Halpin Covered Bridge Road	Town	Town lattice
Rutland Railroad (Note: This bridge is one of two remaining rail road covered bridges in the state of Vermont.)		Addison	Shoreham; 43.85933°N 73.255795°W	1897	108'	Richville Pond on an abandoned railroad bed	VT State Division for Historic Preservation	Howe truss
Paper Mill		Bennington	Bennington; 42.912883°N 73.233393°W	1889	131'	Walloomsac River on Murphy Road	Town	Town lattice
Silk		Bennington	Bennington; 42.909512°N 73.225304°W	1840	88'	Walloomsac River on Silk Road	Town	Town lattice
Henry		Bennington	Bennington; 42.912643°N 73.254647°W	1840	121'	Walloomsac River on Murphy Road	Town	Town lattice
Chiselville		Bennington	Sunderland; 43.072215°N 73.133132°W	1870	117'	Roaring Branch Brook on Sunderland Hill Road	Town	Town lattice
West Arlington		Bennington	Arlington; 43.104445°N 73.220315°W	1852	80'	Batten Kill on Covered Bridge Road	Town	Town lattice
Greenbanks Hollow		Caledonia	Danville; 44.377628°N 72.122004°W	1886	74'	Joe's Brook on Greenbanks Hollow Road	Town	Queen post
Schoolhouse (Note: Closed to motor traffic.)		Caledonia	Lyndon; 44.516174°N 72.010145°W	1879	42'	South Wheelock Branch of Passumpsic River on Wheelock Road	Town(?)	Queen post
Chamberlin		Caledonia	Lyndon; 44.51659°N 72.01647°W	1881	66'	South Wheelock Branch of Passumpsic River on Chamberlin Bridge Road	Town(?)	Queen post
Sanborn (Note: Closed to motor traffic.)		Caledonia	Lyndon; 44.544304°N 72.000875°W	1867	117'	Passumpsic River	Private	Paddleford Truss
Millers Run		Caledonia	Lyndon; 44.542201°N 72.009898°W	1878	56'	Millers Run on Center Street	Town(?)	Queen post
Old Burrington (Note: Closed to motor traffic.)		Caledonia	Lyndon; 44.553644°N 71.969515°W	1865	68'	East Branch of Passumpsic River on Burrington Bridge Road	Private	Queen post
Holmes Creek		Chittenden	Charlotte; 44.333123°N 73.282301°W	1870	41'	Holmes Creek on Lake Road	Town	King Post with tied arch
Seguin (or Sequin)		Chittenden	Charlotte; 44.289068°N 73.15032°W	1850	70'	Lewis Creek on Roscoe Road	Town	Burr Arch
Quinlan's		Chittenden	Charlotte; 44.27641°N 73.18388°W	1849	86'	Lewis Creek on Monkton Road	Town	Burr Arch
Browns River (Note: Closed to motor traffic.)		Chittenden	Westford; 44.61259°N 73.008088°W	1837	97'	Browns River on Cambridge Road	Town	Burr arch
Browns River (Note: Closed to motor traffic.)		Chittenden	Jericho; 44.516404°N 72.946590°W	1967	Unknown Length	Browns River at Mills Riverside Park	Land-Trust	Burr arch
Shelburne Museum (Note: Closed to motor traffic.)		Chittenden	Shelburne; 44.377002°N 73.229527°W	1845	168'	Burr Pond on grounds of Shelburne Museum	Private	Burr arch
Columbia (Note: This bridge is mostly in New Hampshire, due to the state line being the western edge of the river.)		Essex	Lemington; 44.853245°N 71.551691°W	1912	146'	Connecticut River on Columbia Bridge Road	Town	Howe truss
Mount Orne (Note: This bridge is mostly in New Hampshire as the state line is the western edge of the river. Closed to traffic as of May 26, 2010. (see Article: "Mt. Orne Bridge Repairs Completed"))		Essex	Lunenburg; 44.460243°N 71.652709°W	1911	266'	Connecticut River on Mount Orne Bridge Road	Town	Howe truss
Island Pond Footbridge (Note: The length of the truss section is 112'. Overall length includes post and beam staircases on both ends.)		Essex	Island Pond; 44.816295°N 71.88105°W	2003	242'	railroad tracks	Town(?)	Howe truss
Hopkins		Franklin	Enosburg; 44.92062°N 72.673096°W	1875	84'	Trout River on Hopkins Bridge Road	Town	Town lattice
Maple Street		Franklin	Fairfax; 44.663697°N 73.010432°W	1865	57'	Mill Brook on Maple Street	Town	Town lattice
East Fairfield		Franklin	Fairfield; 44.78616°N 72.862294°W	1865	67'	Black Creek on Covered Bridge Road	Town	Queen post
Comstock		Franklin	Montgomery; 44.899637°N 72.644842°W	1883	69'	Trout River on Comstock Bridge Road	Town	Town lattice
West Hill		Franklin	Montgomery; 44.867626°N 72.648318°W	1883	59'	West Hill Brook on Creamery Bridge Road	Town	Town lattice
Fuller		Franklin	Montgomery; 44.903349°N 72.640116°W	1890	50'	Black Falls Brook on South Richford Road	Town	Town lattice
Hectorville (Note: This bridge was dismantled and stored in 2002. It is included on the list because there are reportedly plans to rebuild it (see Article: "Montgomery's Hectorville Bridge Project"))		Franklin	Montgomery; 44.853781°N 72.613599°W	1883	54'	South Branch of Trout River on Gibou Road	Town	Town lattice and King post
Hutchins		Franklin	Montgomery; 44.858628°N 72.612551°W	1883	54'	South Branch of Trout River on Hutchins Bridge Road	Town	Town lattice
Longley		Franklin	Montgomery; 44.90723°N 72.655946°W	1863	85'	Trout River on Longley Bridge Road	Town	Town lattice
Grist Mill		Lamoille	Cambridge; 44.636689°N 72.82537°W	1872	85'	Brewster River on Canyon Road	Town	Burr arch
Poland		Lamoille	Cambridge; 44.651343°N 72.81465°W	1887	153'	Lamoille River on Cambridge Junction Road	Town	Burr arch
Gates Farm		Lamoille	Cambridge; 44.645773°N 72.872314°W	1897	60'	Seymour River on farm access road	Private	Burr arch
Mill		Lamoille	Belvidere; 44.743731°N 72.741433°W	1895	71'	North Branch of Lamoille River on Back Road	Town	Queen post
Morgan		Lamoille	Belvidere; 44.743575°N 72.728097°W	1887	62'	North Branch of Lamoille River on Morgan Bridge Road	Town	Queen post
Power House		Lamoille	Johnson; 44.636118°N 72.670414°W	1872	63'	Gihon River on School Street	Town	Queen post
Scribner		Lamoille	Johnson; 44.638227°N 72.648559°W	?	48'	Gihon River on Rocky Road	Town	Queen post
Red		Lamoille	Morristown; 44.518698°N 72.67772°W	1896	64'	Sterling Brook on Cole Hill Road	Town	King post and Queen post
Emily's (Note: Reportedly haunted!)		Lamoille	Stowe; 44.440483°N 72.679831°W	1844	49'	Gold Brook on Covered Bridge Road	Town	Queen post
Village		Lamoille	Waterville; 44.690151°N 72.770983°W	1877	61'	North Branch of Lamoille River on Church Street	Town	Queen post
Montgomery		Lamoille	Waterville; 44.705735°N 72.760236°W	1877	70'	North Branch of Lamoille River on Montgomery Road	Town	Queen post
Codding Hollow		Lamoille	Waterville; 44.712167°N 72.756247°W	1877	62'	North Branch of Lamoille River on Codding Hollow Road	Town	Queen post
Fisher Railroad		Lamoille	Wolcott; 44.532487°N 72.427832°W	1908	98'	Lamoille River on Railroad line	State of Vermont	Double Web Town lattice with steel deck supports
Moxley		Orange	Chelsea; 43.957032°N 72.463401°W	1883	56'	First Branch of White River on Moxley Road	Town	Queen post
Kingsbury		Orange	Randolph; 43.880859°N 72.582008°W	1904	46'	Second Branch of White River on Kingsbury Road	Town	multiple King post
Gifford		Orange	Randolph; 43.916258°N 72.555052°W	1904	46'	Second Branch of White River on Hyde Road	Town	multiple King post
Braley		Orange	Randolph; 43.928528°N 72.555098°W	1904	38'	Second Branch of White River on Braley Covered Bridge Road	Town	multiple King post
Union Village		Orange	Thetford; 43.788728°N 72.254071°W	1867	111'	Ompompanoosuc River on Academy Road	Town	multiple King post variation
Sayres		Orange	Thetford; 43.832139°N 72.25278°W	?	127'	Ompompanoosuc River on Tucker Hill Road	Town	Haupt truss variant with arch
Howe		Orange	Tunbridge; 43.864938°N 72.499031°W	1879	75'	First Branch of White River on Belnap Brook Road	Town	multiple King post
Cilley		Orange	Tunbridge; 43.883036°N 72.5039°W	1883	68'	First Branch of White River on Howe Lane	Town	multiple King post
Mill		Orange	Tunbridge; 43.891827°N 72.49158°W	1883; replicated in 2000	76'	First Branch of White River on Spring Road	Town	multiple King post
Larkin		Orange	Tunbridge; 43.923065°N 72.465506°W	1902	68'	First Branch of White River on Larkin Road	Town	multiple King post
Flint		Orange	Tunbridge; 43.949368°N 72.458621°W	1845	87'	First Branch of White River on Bicknell Hill Road	Town	Queen post
Lord's Creek		Orleans	Irasburg; 44.816565°N 72.266487°W	1881	50'	Black River on Covered Bridge Road	Private	Paddleford truss
Black River		Orleans	Irasburg; 44.860981°N 72.273321°W	1881	87'	Black River on Hermanville Road	Town	Paddleford truss
Depot		Rutland	Pittsford; 43.709567°N 73.04268°W	1853	126'	Otter Creek on Depot Hill Road	Town	Town lattice
Cooley		Rutland	Pittsford; 43.690459°N 73.028583°W	1849	51'	Furnace Brook on Elm Street	Town	Town lattice
Hammond (Note: Closed to vehicle traffic (bypassed).)		Rutland	Pittsford; 43.720703°N 73.053562°W	1843	145'	Otter Creek next to Kendall Hill Road	VT Division for Historic Preservation	Town lattice
Gorham		Rutland	Pittsford; 43.680041°N 73.037539°W	1842	115'	Otter Creek on Gorham Bridge Road	Town	Town lattice
Sanderson		Rutland	Brandon; 43.789661°N 73.111761°W	1840	132'	Otter Creek on Pearl St Extension	Town	Town lattice
Kingsley		Rutland	Clarendon; 43.523869°N 72.941065°W	1870	121'	Mill River on East Street	Town	Town lattice
Brown		Rutland	Shrewsbury; 43.566326°N 72.918915°W	1880	112'	Cold River on Upper Cold River Rd	Town	Town lattice
Twin (Note: This bridge is now on dry land, and boarded up. It is being used as a storage shed by the Town of Rutland Highway Department.)		Rutland	Rutland; 43.648645°N 72.972672°W	1850	60'	dry land	Town	Town lattice
Coburn		Washington	East Montpelier; 44.280848°N 72.454198°W	1840s	69'	Winooski River on Coburn Road	Town	Queen post
Orton Farm (Note: Last authentic covered bridge left in Vermont that was built for agricultural use.)		Washington	Marshfield; 44.287567°N 72.40818°W	1890	45'	Winooski River on a farm access road	Town	Queen post
Stony Brook		Washington	Northfield; 44.120409°N 72.689189°W	1899	37'	Stony Brook on Stony Brook Road	Town	King post
Northfield Falls		Washington	Northfield; 44.172491°N 72.651469°W	1872	137'	Dog River on Cox Brook Road	Town	Town lattice
Slaughter House		Washington	Northfield; 44.168569°N 72.65457°W	1872	60'	Dog River on Slaughterhouse Road	Town	Queen post
Lower Cox Brook		Washington	Northfield; 44.172788°N 72.653039°W	1872	57'	Cox Brook on Cox Brook Road	Town	Queen post
Upper Cox Brook		Washington	Northfield; 44.173809°N 72.655565°W	1872	52'	Cox Brook on Cox Brook Road	Town	Queen post
Pine Brook		Washington	Waitsfield; 44.205639°N 72.792132°W	1872	48'	Pine Brook on North Road	Town	King post
Great Eddy		Washington	Waitsfield; 44.189497°N 72.823608°W	1833	105'	Mad River on Bridge Street	Town	Burr arch
Warren		Washington	Warren; 44.111185°N 72.857037°W	1880	55'	Mad River on Covered Bridge Road	Town	Queen post
Robbins Nest (Note: Replica of Old Bridge which was located just downstream.)		Washington	Barre; 44.178703°N 72.470833°W	1864	57'	Jail Branch of Winooski River on private drive	Private	Queen post
Kent's Corner		Washington	Calais; 44.367867°N 72.484287°W	1963	22'	Curtis Brook on homestead path	Private	King post
AM Foster (Note: Replica of Orton Farm Bridge)		Washington	Cabot; 44.423546°N 72.268453°W	1988	40'	pond	Private	Queen post
Creamery (Note: Bypassed in 2010. (see: Article: "Brattleboro's Creamery Bridge By-pass Project Status"))		Windham	Brattleboro; 42.849905°N 72.585664°W	1879	80'	Whetstone Brook at Guilford Street	Town	Town lattice
West Dummerston (Note: This is the longest covered bridge completely within Vermont borders.)		Windham	West Dummerston; 42.936654°N 72.612757°W	1872	280'	West River on Covered Bridge Road	Town	Town lattice
Kidder Hill		Windham	Grafton; 43.169194°N 72.605459°W	1870	67'	South Branch of Saxtons River on Kidder Hill Road	Town	Modified King post
Green River		Windham	Guilford; 42.775523°N 72.667238°W	1870	104'	Green River at Jacksonville Stage Road	Town	Town lattice
Williamsville		Windham	Newfane; 42.943012°N 72.686848°W	1870	118'	Rock River at Dover Road	Town	Town lattice
Hall (Note: Replaced in 1982 with a bridge of similar design, after a truck broke the old bridge in 1980. See "Around Bellows Falls: Rockingham, Westminster, and Saxtons River" By Anne L. Collins, Virginia Lisai, and Louise Luring. Arcadia Publishing, 2002. ISBN 978-0-7385-1033-0, page 127. Parts of the old bridge are on display outside the Saxtons River Cemetery on Westminster St.)		Windham	Rockingham; 43.137494°N 72.487243°W	1870	121'	Saxtons River Hall Bridge Road	Town	Town lattice
Victorian Village (Note: Also called Depot Covered Bridge.)		Windham	Rockingham; 43.196894°N 72.50412°W	1872	44'	Rock Brook at the Vermont Country Store	Private	Modified King post
Worrall Bridge		Windham	Rockingham; 43.211831°N 72.535558°W	1870	83'	Williams River on Williams Road	Town	Town lattice
Scott (Note: This bridge has the longest single span in the state of Vermont, at 166'.)		Windham	Townshend; 43.048745°N 72.696388°W	1870	276'	West River on Back Side Road	Town	Town lattice with added arch with Howe truss metal rods for verticals
High Mowing		Windham	Wilmington; 42.884085°N 72.848577°W	1949	21'	Stowe Brook	Private	Town lattice
Johnny Esau (Note: At Marlboro Elementary School. Built by school students and modeled after the Silk Covered Bridge)		Windham	Marlboro; 42.869226°N 72.719675°W	2004	15'	Unknown brook	Town(?)	Town lattice
Hitchcock-Cormier		Windham	Rockingham; 43.161488°N 72.55163°W	2008	22'	Unknown brook	?	Town lattice
Bartonsville (Note: Replaced a bridge built in 1870 and destroyed by flooding in 2011.)		Windham	Rockingham; 43.224231°N 72.536792°W	2012	168'	Williams River	?	Town lattice
Baltimore (Note: At Eureka Schoolhouse Park... closed to motor traffic.)		Windsor	Springfield; 43.270319°N 72.448252°W	1870	47'	dry land	Town	Town lattice
Stoughton (Note: In a field across from Weathersfield Elementary School. Owners welcome visitors. No motor traffic.)		Windsor	Weathersfield; 43.36853°N 72.516466°W	1880	48'	Schoolhouse Brook	Private	Multiple King post
Salmond		Windsor	Weathersfield; 43.426849°N 72.488388°W	1875	53'	Sherman Brook on Henry Gould Road	Town	Multiple King post
Upper Falls		Windsor	Weathersfield; 43.398687°N 72.522072°W	1840	120'	Black River on Upper Falls Road	Town	Town lattice
Bests		Windsor	West Windsor; 43.455201°N 72.516396°W	1889	37'	Mill Brook on Churchill Road	Town	Tied arch
Bowers		Windsor	West Windsor; 43.461416°N 72.490727°W	1919	45'	Mill Brook on Bowers Road	Town	Tied arch
Taftsville		Windsor	Taftsville; 43.631102°N 72.467725°W	1836	189'	Ottauquechee River on River Road	Town	Multiple King post and arch
Lincoln		Windsor	Woodstock; 43.600768°N 72.568868°W	1877	136'	Ottauquechee River on Fletcher Hill Road	Town	Pratt truss with arch
Union Street		Windsor	Woodstock; 43.624745°N 72.520452°W	1969	139'	Ottauquechee River on Mountain Ave	Town	Town lattice
South Pomfret		Windsor	Pomfret; 43.661255°N 72.537677°W	1870	39'	Barnard Brook on private lane	Private	Town lattice
Martins Mill		Windsor	Hartland; 43.5325°N 72.395949°W	1881	135'	Lulls Brook on Martinsville Road	Town	Town lattice
Willard		Windsor	Hartland; 43.59387°N 72.349455°W	1870	125'	Ottauquechee River on Mill Street	Town	Town lattice
(Willard) Twin (Note: Located a few yards south of Willard Bridge. Replaces a Covered Bridge previously at this location prior to 1938.)		Windsor	Hartland; 43.593687°N 72.350158°W	2001	81'	Ottauquechee River on Mill Street	Town	Town lattice
Windsor-Cornish (Note: This bridge is mostly in New Hampshire, due to the state line being the western edge of the river. Longest wooden bridge in the United States. Longest two span covered bridge in the world)		Windsor	Windsor; 43.47382°N 72.383981°W	1866	449'	Connecticut River on Bridge Street	New Hampshire Department of Transportation	Town lattice
Ledoux Hometown (Note: At the entrance to a Nature and Fitness trail, near the Elementary School.)		Windsor	Reading; 43.452783°N 72.535354°W	2008	15'	seasonal brook	Private	Town lattice

== Destroyed ==
- The Old Mead Covered Bridge in Pittsford was destroyed by fire on July 22, 1971.
- The Twigg-Smith Covered Bridge in West Windsor was destroyed by wind in 2002.
- The Frank Lewis Covered Bridge in Woodstock was destroyed by Hurricane Irene on August 28, 2011.
- The Cedar Swamp Covered Bridge in Cornwall was destroyed by fire on September 10, 2016.
- The River Road Covered Bridge in Troy was destroyed by a snowmobile fire on February 6, 2021.

== See also ==
- List of non-authentic Covered Bridges in Vermont
- List of bridges on the National Register of Historic Places in Vermont
- List of Vermont-related topics
