= Warren Covered Bridge =

Bridge in Warren, Vermont, United States

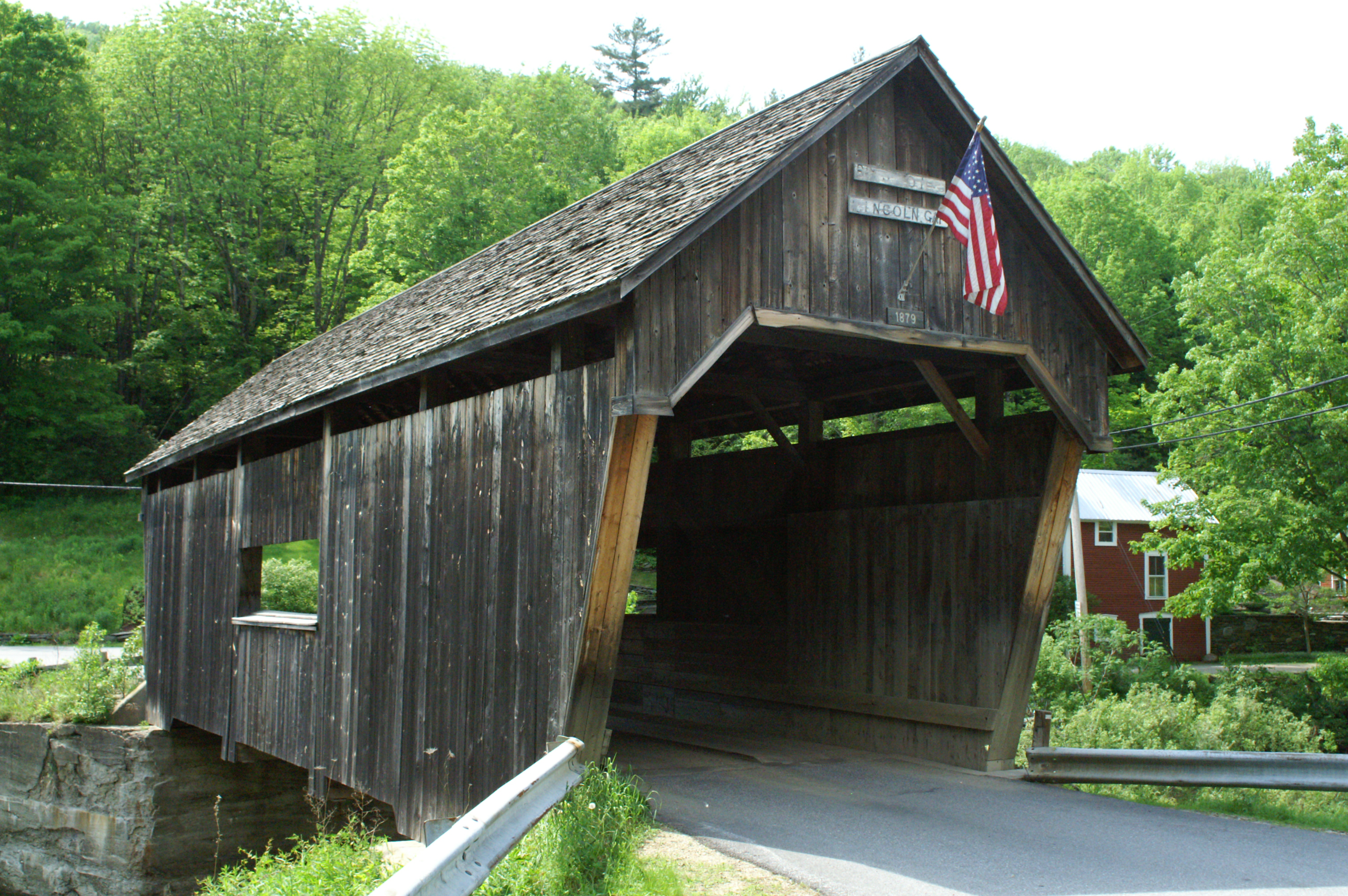
- The bridge seen in 2011
- Coordinates: 44°06′40″N 72°51′25″W
- Carries: Automobile
- Crosses: Mad River
- Locale: Warren, Vermont
- Maintained by: Town of Warren
- ID number: VT-12-15

Characteristics
- Design: Covered, queen post
- Material: Wood
- Total length: 57.5 ft (17.53 m)
- Width: 13.8 ft (4.21 m)
- No. of spans: 1
- Load limit: 8 tons
- Clearance above: 10 ft (3.05 m)

History
- Constructed by: Walter Bagley
- Construction end: 1880
- Warren Covered Bridge
- U.S. National Register of Historic Places
- Location within Vermont Location within the United States
- Coordinates: 44°06′40″N 72°51′25″W
- Area: 1 acre (0.4 ha)
- NRHP reference No.: 74000269
- Added to NRHP: August 7, 1974

The Warren Covered Bridge is a wooden covered bridge that crosses the Mad River in Warren, Vermont, USA on Covered Bridge Road. It was listed on the National Register of Historic Places in 1974.

The bridge is of queen post truss design. A sign on the bridge also identifies it as the Lincoln Gap covered bridge, despite no official reference to that name. A unique oddity with this bridge is the fact that the eastern portal extends further over the approaching roadway than the western, according to a sign posted in the bridge by the Vermont Festival of the Arts. This trusses on this bridge are covered not only on the outside, but on the inside as well... one of only two bridges left in the state with similar construction (the other being the School House Covered Bridge).

== Recent history ==
The bridge deck was strengthened and roof replaced in 1995. In 1999 it was closed to all traffic after inspections found problems that were being hidden by the covering on the inside of the trusses. The bridge was extensively rehabilitated and re-dedicated on October 6, 2000.

On August 28, 2011, one of the abutments of the bridge received damage due to flooding caused by Hurricane Irene. It appears the bridge itself was not damaged and as of 2020 the bridge is open to traffic.

== See also ==
- National Register of Historic Places listings in Washington County, Vermont
- List of Vermont covered bridges
- List of bridges on the National Register of Historic Places in Vermont
