= Slaughter House Covered Bridge =

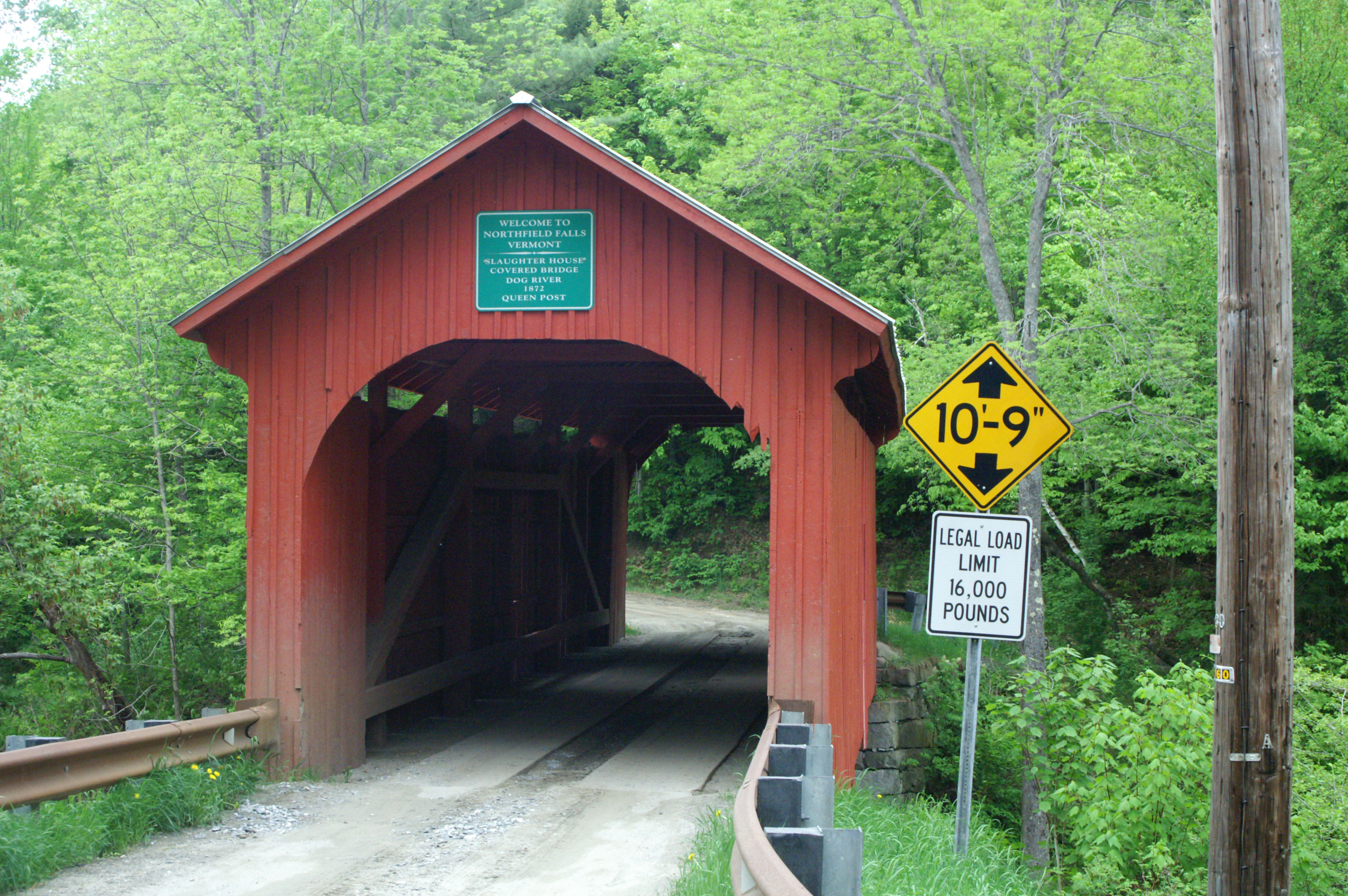
- Bridge in U.S. state of Vermont
- Coordinates: 44°10′05″N 72°39′14″W
- Carries: Automobile
- Crosses: Dog River
- Locale: Northfield, Vermont
- Maintained by: Town of Northfield
- ID number: VT-12-09

Characteristics
- Design: Covered, Queen post
- Material: Wood
- Total length: 59.6 ft (18.17 m)
- Width: 11.75 ft (3.58 m)
- No. of spans: 1
- Load limit: 8 tons
- Clearance above: 10.75 ft (3.28 m)

History
- Constructed by: unknown
- Construction end: 1872
- Slaughter House Covered Bridge
- U.S. National Register of Historic Places
- Location within Vermont Location within the United States
- Coordinates: 44°10′06″N 72°39′16″W
- Area: 1 acre (0.4 ha)
- NRHP reference No.: 74000265
- Added to NRHP: June 13, 1974

The Slaughter House (or Slaughterhouse) Covered Bridge is a wooden covered bridge that carries Slaughterhouse Road across the Dog River in Northfield, Vermont. The Queen post truss bridge is one of five surviving 19th-century bridges in the town. It was listed on the National Register of Historic Places in 1974.

== Description and history ==
The Slaughterhouse Bridge is located just outside the village of Northfield Falls, a short way west of Vermont Route 12 on Slaughterhouse Road, a dead-end road that once provided access to an eponymous business. The Dog River, a tributary of the Winooski River, flows north, with the village mainly on the east side. The bridge is a single-span Queen post truss design, resting on dry laid stone abutments. The trusses are 59.5 feet (18.1 m) long, and the bridge has a total width of 14.5 feet (4.4 m), carrying one lane of traffic. The exterior is clad in vertical board siding, which extends around to the insides of the portals. The siding ends short of the roof, providing an open strip between them. The projecting gable ends are cut in the shape of a reverse ogee.

The bridge was built in 1872. It is one of five surviving 19th-century covered bridges in the town, representing one of the highest concentration of these historic structures in the state. There are no documents to verify, but the 8-ton weight limit seems to indicate that the deck has been reinforced by Ɪ-beams, likely in the 20th century.

== See also ==
- List of covered bridges in Vermont
- National Register of Historic Places listings in Washington County, Vermont
- List of bridges on the National Register of Historic Places in Vermont
