= Scribner Covered Bridge =

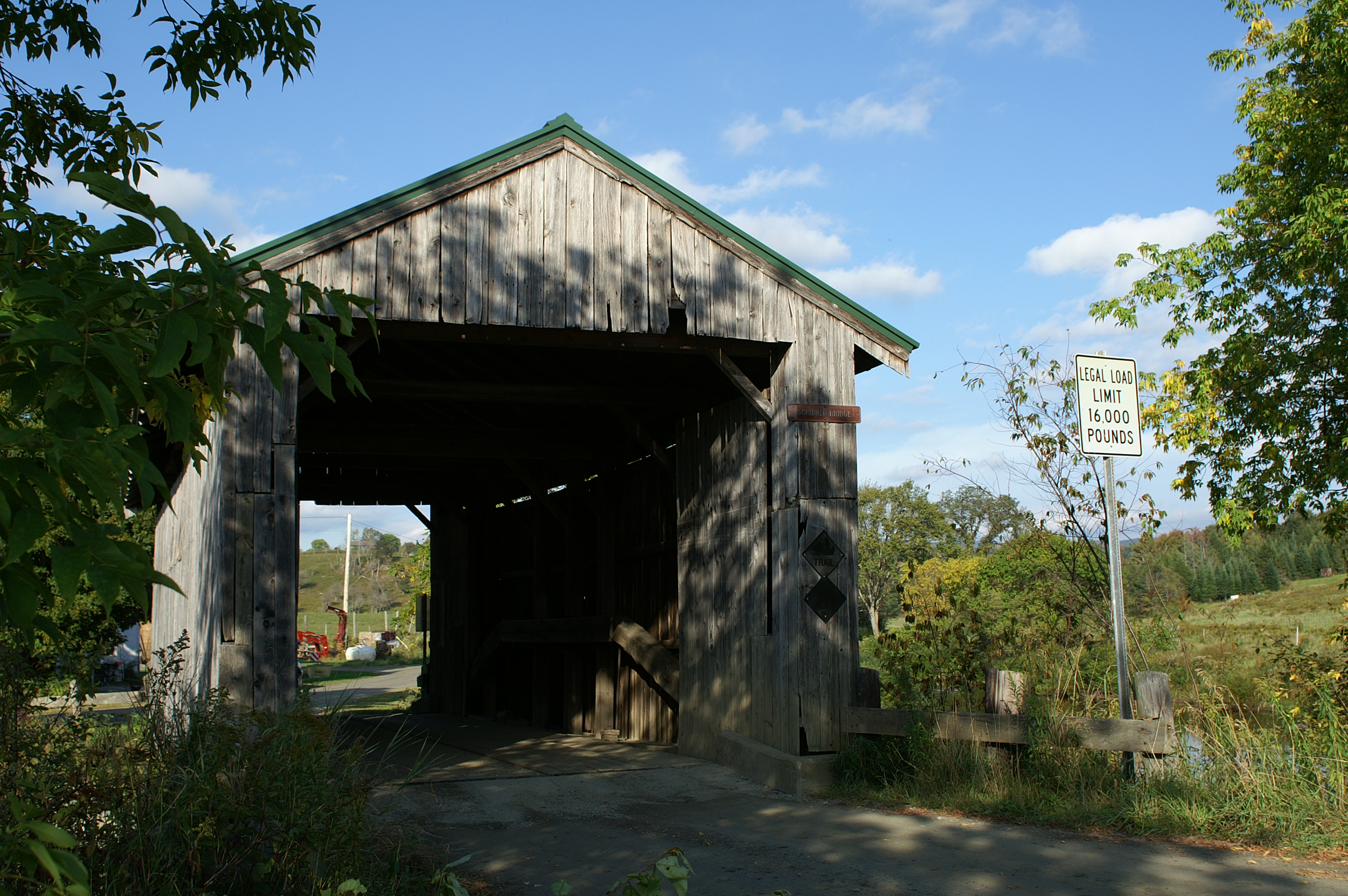
- Bridge in U.S. state of Vermont
- Coordinates: 44°38′17″N 72°38′53″W
- Carries: Automobile
- Crosses: Gihon River
- Locale: Johnson, Vermont
- Maintained by: Town of Johnson
- ID number: VT-08-09

Characteristics
- Design: Covered, Queen post
- Material: Wood
- Total length: 47.8 ft (14.57 m)
- Width: 12.4 ft (3.78 m)
- No. of spans: 1
- Load limit: 8 tons
- Clearance above: 8.25 ft (2.51 m)

History
- Constructed by: unknown
- Construction end: unknown
- Scribner Covered Bridge
- U.S. National Register of Historic Places
- Location within Vermont Location within the United States
- Coordinates: 44°38′17″N 72°38′53″W
- Area: 1 acre (0.40 ha)
- NRHP reference No.: 74000233
- Added to NRHP: October 1, 1974

The Scribner Covered Bridge, also known as the Mudgett Covered Bridge, is a covered bridge that carries Rocky Road across the Gihon River off State Route 100C in eastern Johnson, Vermont. It was listed on the National Register of Historic Places in 1974. It is one of a small number of Vermont's covered bridges that are the result of covering an existing open bridge.

== Description and history ==
The Scribner Covered Bridge stands in a rural area of eastern Johnson, carrying Rocky Road across the Gihon River between Vermont Route 100C and Sinclair Road. It is a single-span queen post truss, 48 feet (15 m) long and 17.5 feet (5.3 m) wide, with a roadway width of 13.5 feet (4.1 m) (one lane). It is covered by a gabled metal roof, and its exterior is clad in vertical board siding, which extends around to the insides of the portals. On the sides, the siding ends short of the roof, leaving an open strip. The bridge rests on concrete abutments that date to 1960. The trusses are unusually short and lack internal bracing, and their corner joints have been reinforced with metal plates.

The bridge's construction date and builder are not known. It has been determined that the bridge was originally an uncovered Pony truss bridge, due to the relatively low height of the queen post trusses and the discovery of supporting documents. In 1960, minor repairs were carried out and steel I beams were installed underneath the road deck.

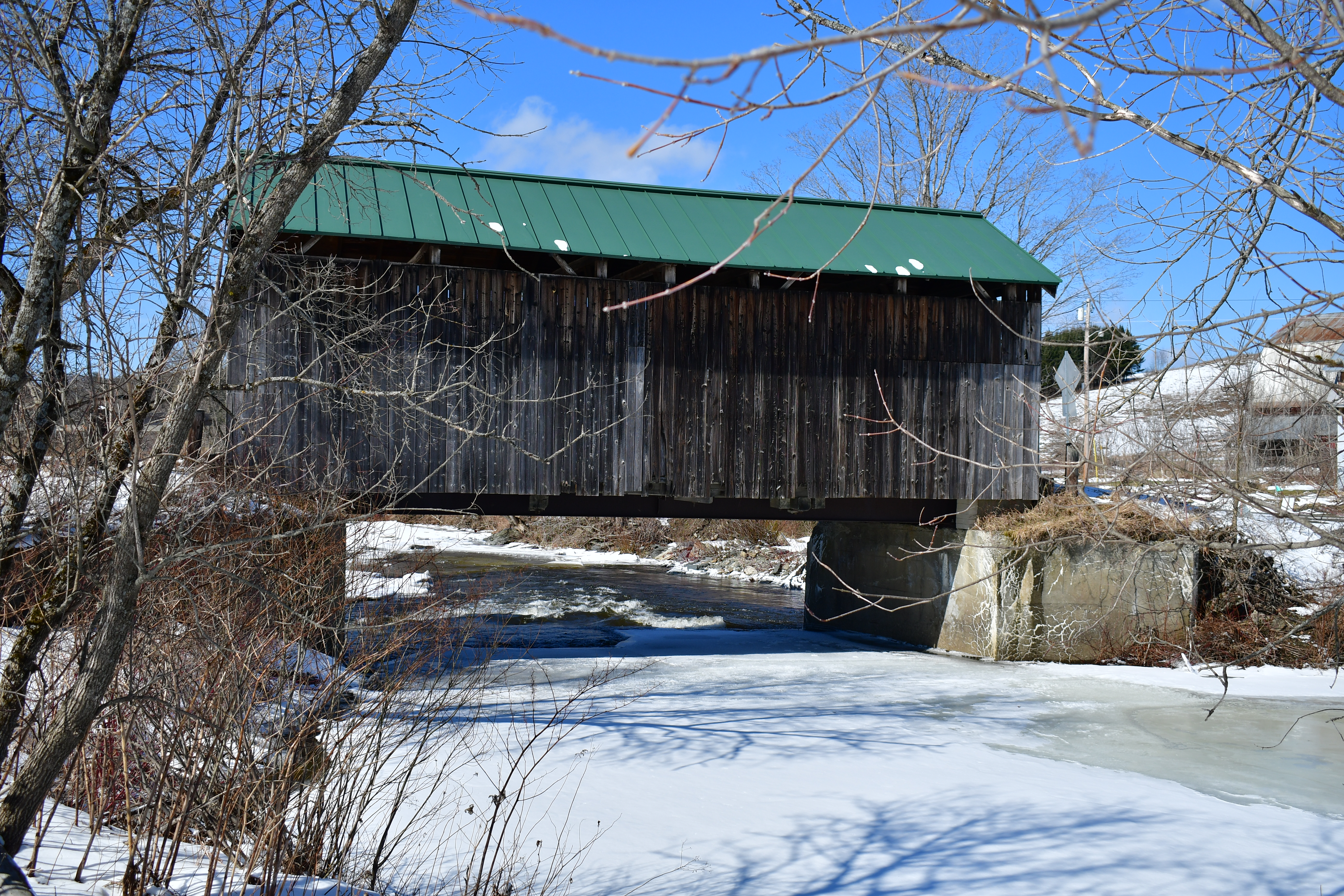

== See also ==
- National Register of Historic Places listings in Lamoille County, Vermont
- List of Vermont covered bridges
- List of bridges on the National Register of Historic Places in Vermont
