= East Fairfield Covered Bridge =

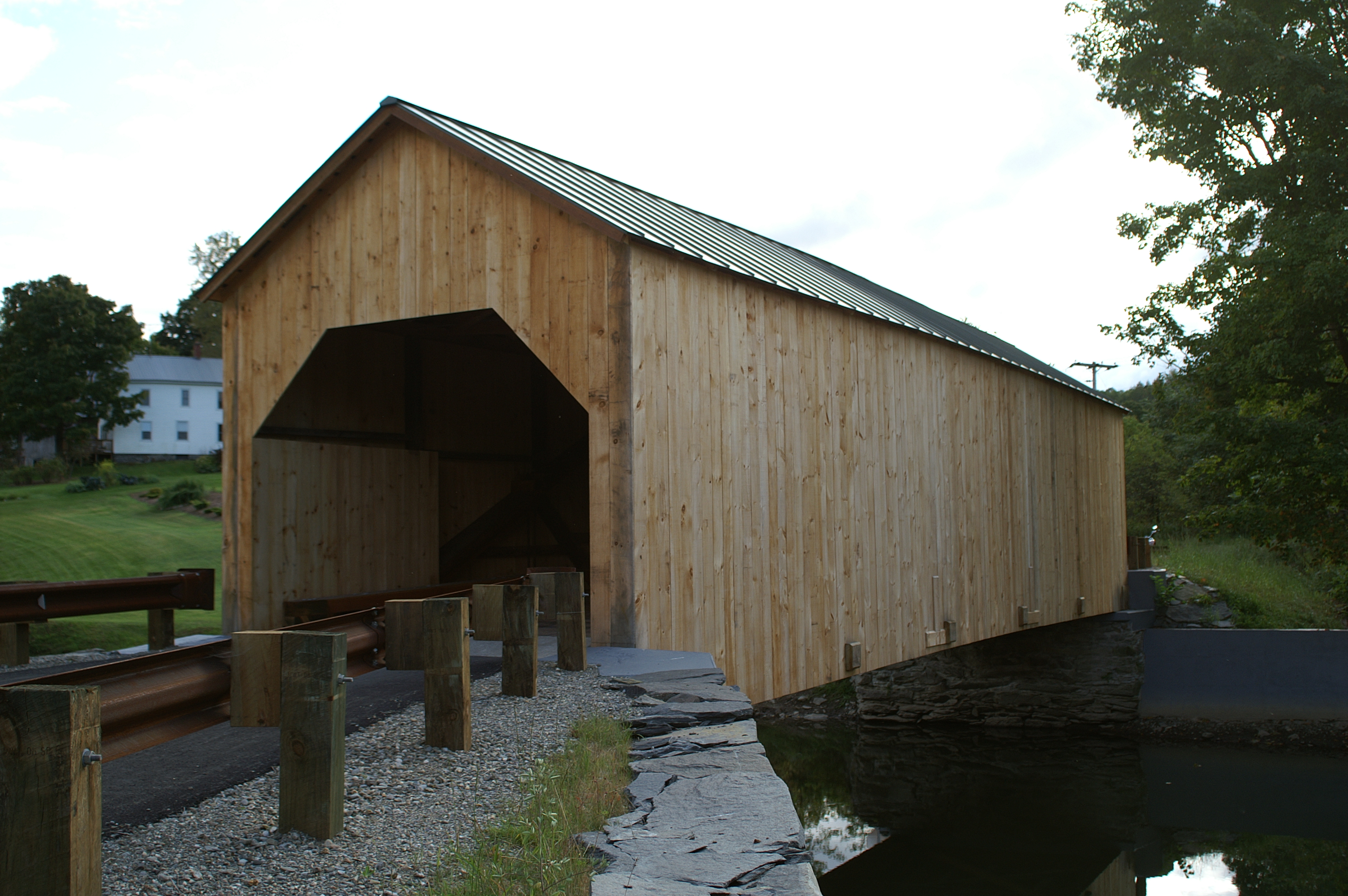
- Coordinates: 44°47′10″N 72°51′43″W
- Carries: Automobile
- Crosses: Black Creek
- Locale: East Fairfield, Vermont
- Maintained by: Town of East Fairfield
- ID number: VT-06-03

Characteristics
- Design: Covered, Queen post
- Material: Wood
- Total length: 67.3 ft (20.51 m)
- Width: 13.6 ft (4.15 m)
- No. of spans: 1

History
- Construction end: 1865
- East Fairfield Covered Bridge
- U.S. National Register of Historic Places
- Area: 1 acre (0.40 ha)
- NRHP reference No.: 74000214
- Added to NRHP: November 19, 1974

Location
- Interactive map of East Fairfield Covered Bridge

The East Fairfield Covered Bridge is a covered bridge that carries Bridge Street across Black Creek in the East Fairfield village of Fairfield, Vermont. Built about 1865, it is the town's only surviving 19th century covered bridge. It was listed on the National Register of Historic Places in 1974.

== Description and history ==
The East Fairfield Covered Bridge is located at the western end of East Fairfield village, on Bridge Street a short way south of Vermont Route 36. It spans Black Creek, a tributary of the Missisquoi River, in a roughly northeast-southwest orientation. It is a Queen post truss structure, 68 feet (21 m) long and 16.5 feet (5.0 m) wide, with a roadway width of 13 feet (4.0 m) (one lane). It rests on abutments of dry laid stone, which have been further finished in concrete and mortar. The trusses include vertical iron roads, and are joined by a web of iron rods above to increase lateral stability. The road deck consists of planking laid perpendicular to the trusses. The exterior is finished in vertical board siding, which extends a short way inside the portals. The bridge was built about 1865; its builder is not known.

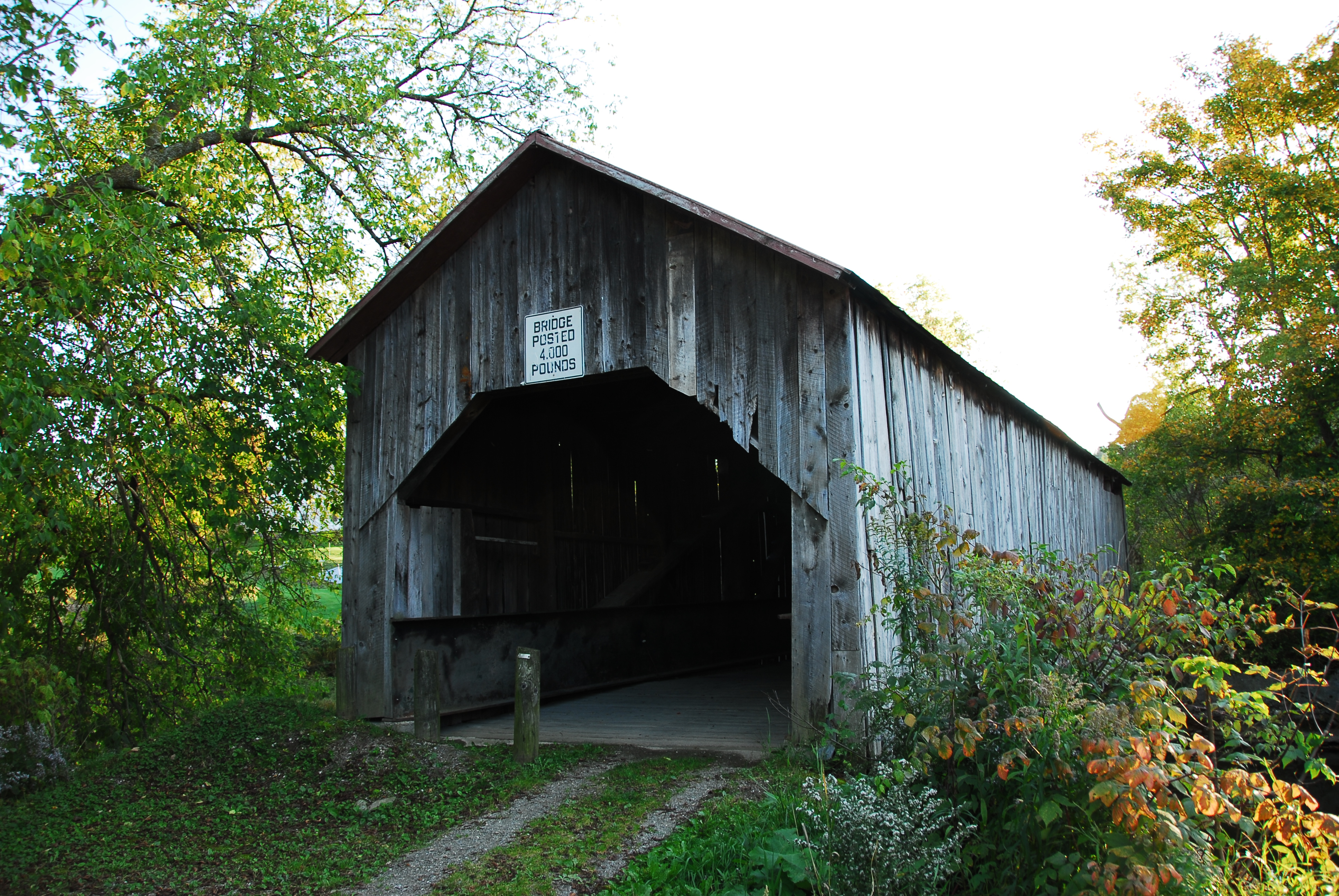
The East Fairfield Covered Bridge in September 2007, before reconstruction

Multiple attempts to keep the bridge open were undertaken by the town during various times in recent history, but eventually it had to be closed to all traffic. In August 2008, the contracting company of Blow & Cote began reconstruction of the bridge. Work was completed and the bridge reopened to traffic on July 5, 2009.

== See also ==
- List of covered bridges in Vermont
- National Register of Historic Places listings in Franklin County, Vermont
- List of bridges on the National Register of Historic Places in Vermont
