= Martin Covered Bridge =

Wooden bridge in Marshfield, Vermont

- U.S. National Register of Historic Places
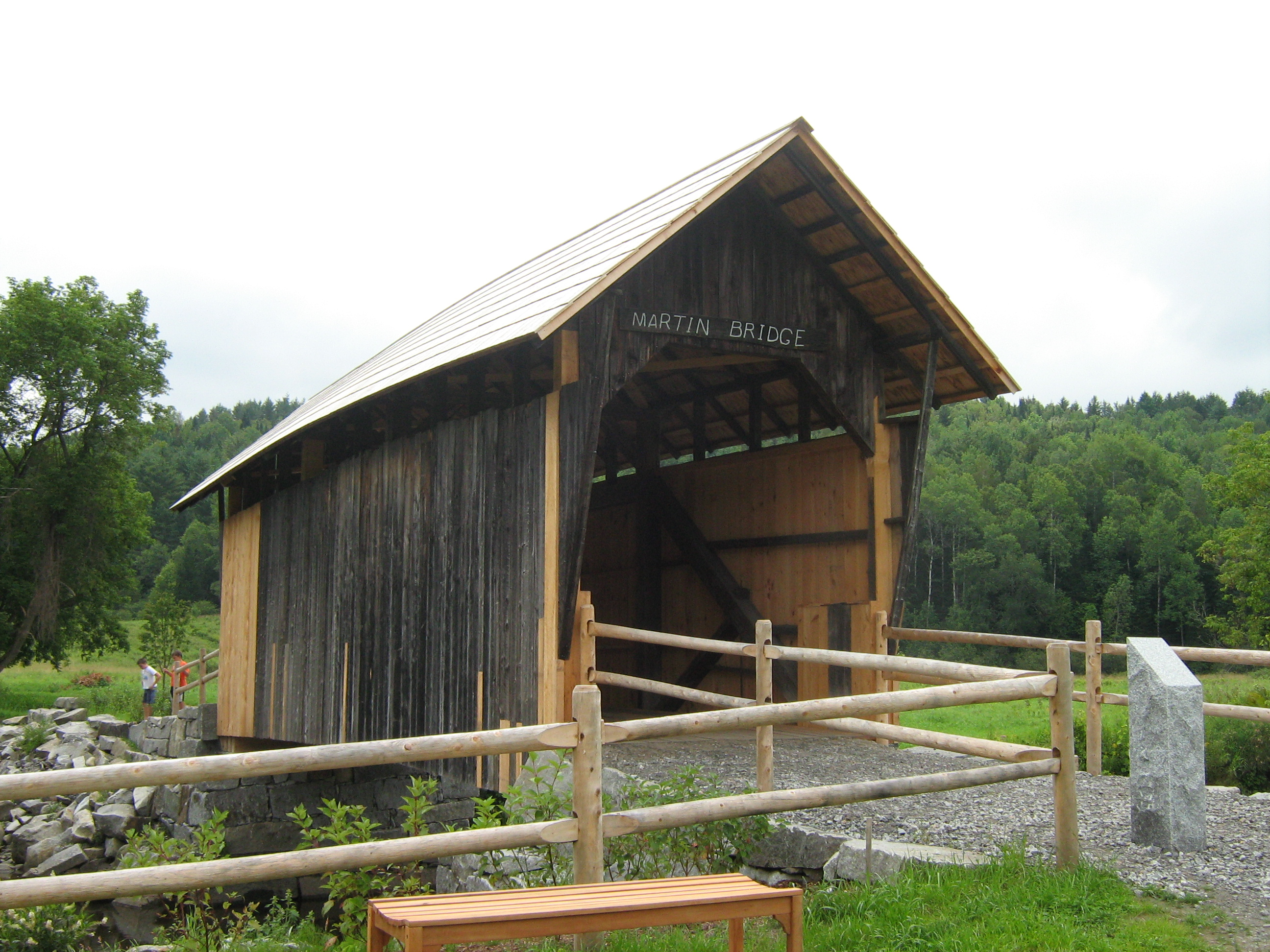

- Location within Vermont Location within the United States
- Location: off US 2 over the Winooski River, Marshfield, Vermont
- Coordinates: 44°17′15″N 72°24′30″W
- Area: 1 acre (0.40 ha)
- Built: 1890
- Architectural style: Single span queenpost truss
- NRHP reference No.: 74000358
- Added to NRHP: October 9, 1974

The Martin Covered Bridge is a wooden covered bridge spanning the Winooski River off United States Route 2 in southern Marshfield, Vermont. Built about 1890, it is the only surviving historic covered bridge in the town. It was listed on the National Register of Historic Places in 1974.

== Description and history ==
The Martin Covered Bridge is located in southern Marshfield, about 1 mile (1.6 km) north of Plainfield village, on the east side of US 2. At one time the bridge carried a private farm road; it is now open only to pedestrians. It is a single-span queenpost truss structure, 45 feet (14 m) long and 12.5 feet (3.8 m) wide, with a roadway width of 10.5 feet (3.2 m). It is covered by a gabled roof and its exterior is clad in vertical board siding. The siding does not rise all the way to the roof, and extends a shortway into the portals, sheltering the projecting upper ends. The abutments are made of roughly coursed dry laid stone. The trusses incorporate iron rods, which extend vertically from the bracing diagonals to the bottom chords.

The bridge was built about 1890 by Herman F. Townsend, a prominent local bridgewright. It is one of the few surviving 19th century bridges in the state that was originally built on a private road, and is Marshfield's only surviving historic covered bridge.

== See also ==
- List of covered bridges in Vermont
- National Register of Historic Places listings in Washington County, Vermont
- List of bridges on the National Register of Historic Places in Vermont
