= Red Covered Bridge (Morristown, Vermont) =

- U.S. National Register of Historic Places
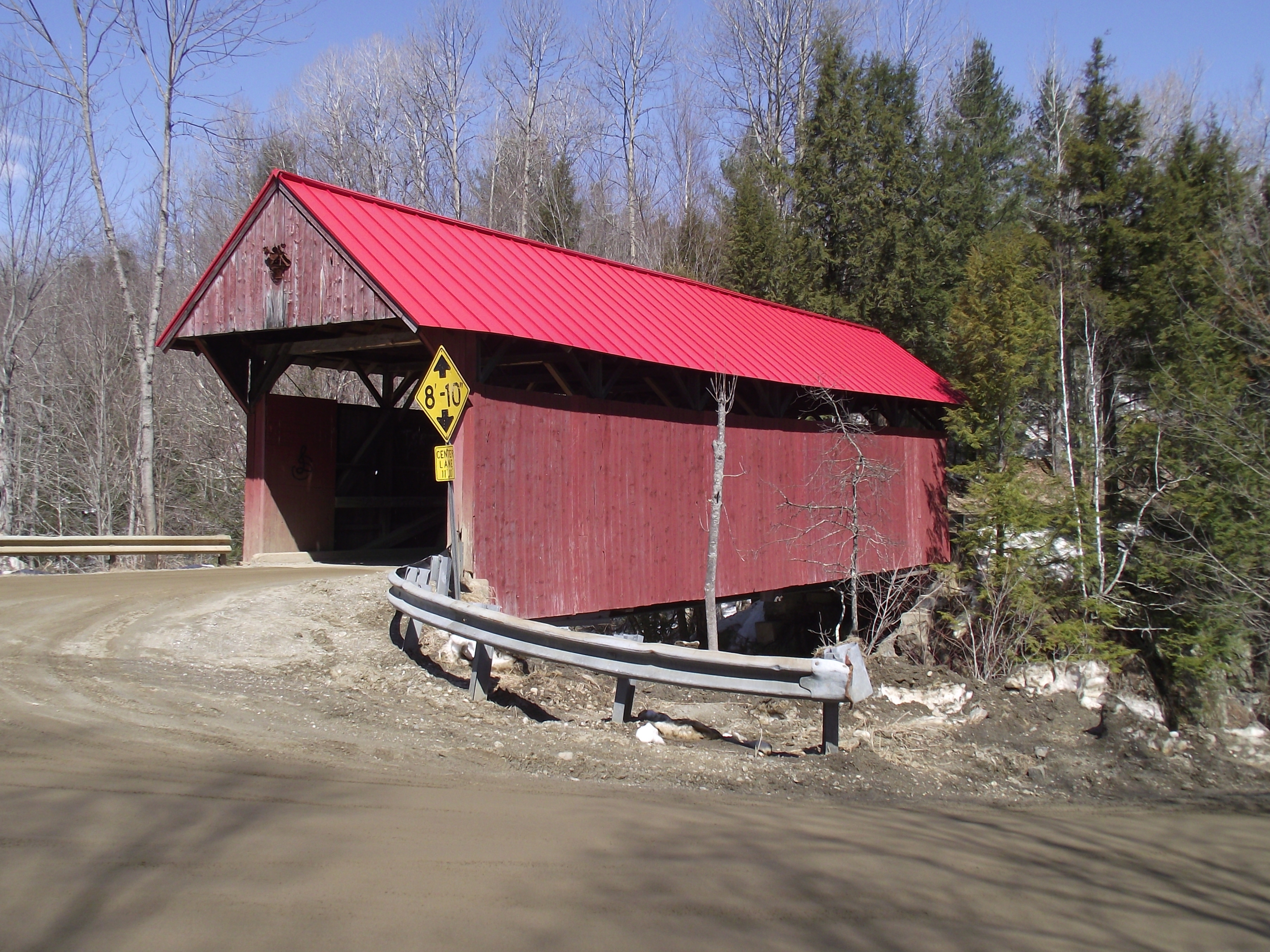

- Location within Vermont Location within the United States
- Location: Cole Hill Rd. over Sterling Brook, Morristown, Vermont
- Coordinates: 44°31′7″N 72°40′40″W
- Area: 1 acre (0.40 ha)
- Built: 1896
- Architectural style: queenpost truss
- NRHP reference No.: 74000232
- Added to NRHP: October 16, 1974

The Red Covered Bridge is a historic covered bridge, carrying Cole Hill Road across Sterling Brook in Morristown, Vermont. Built in 1896, it is the only surviving 19th-century covered bridge in the town, and one of the last to be built during the historic period of covered bridge construction in the state. It is of queen post truss design, and was listed on the National Register of Historic Places in 1974.

== Description and history ==
The Red Covered Bridge is located in a rural area of southwestern Morristown, just north of the junction of Cole Hill Road, Sterling Valley Road, and Moren Loop. It is a single-span queen post truss, 64 feet (20 m) long and 18.5 feet (5.6 m) wide, with a roadway width of 15 feet (4.6 m), carrying one lane of traffic. The bridge is covered by a red metal roof, and its exterior is clad in red-painted vertical board siding, which extends around to the insides of the portals. The siding does not extend all the way to the roof, leaving an open strip between the two. The bridge rests on abutments of stone and concrete; the north abutment includes a large granite outcrop. The bridge deck is supported by steel I-beams installed in 1971 to carry the active load.

The bridge was built in 1896, one of the last known to be built in the 19th century in Vermont. Its construction is somewhat unusual, with distinctively thicker bottom chords on the trusses, built out of twelve layers of planking.

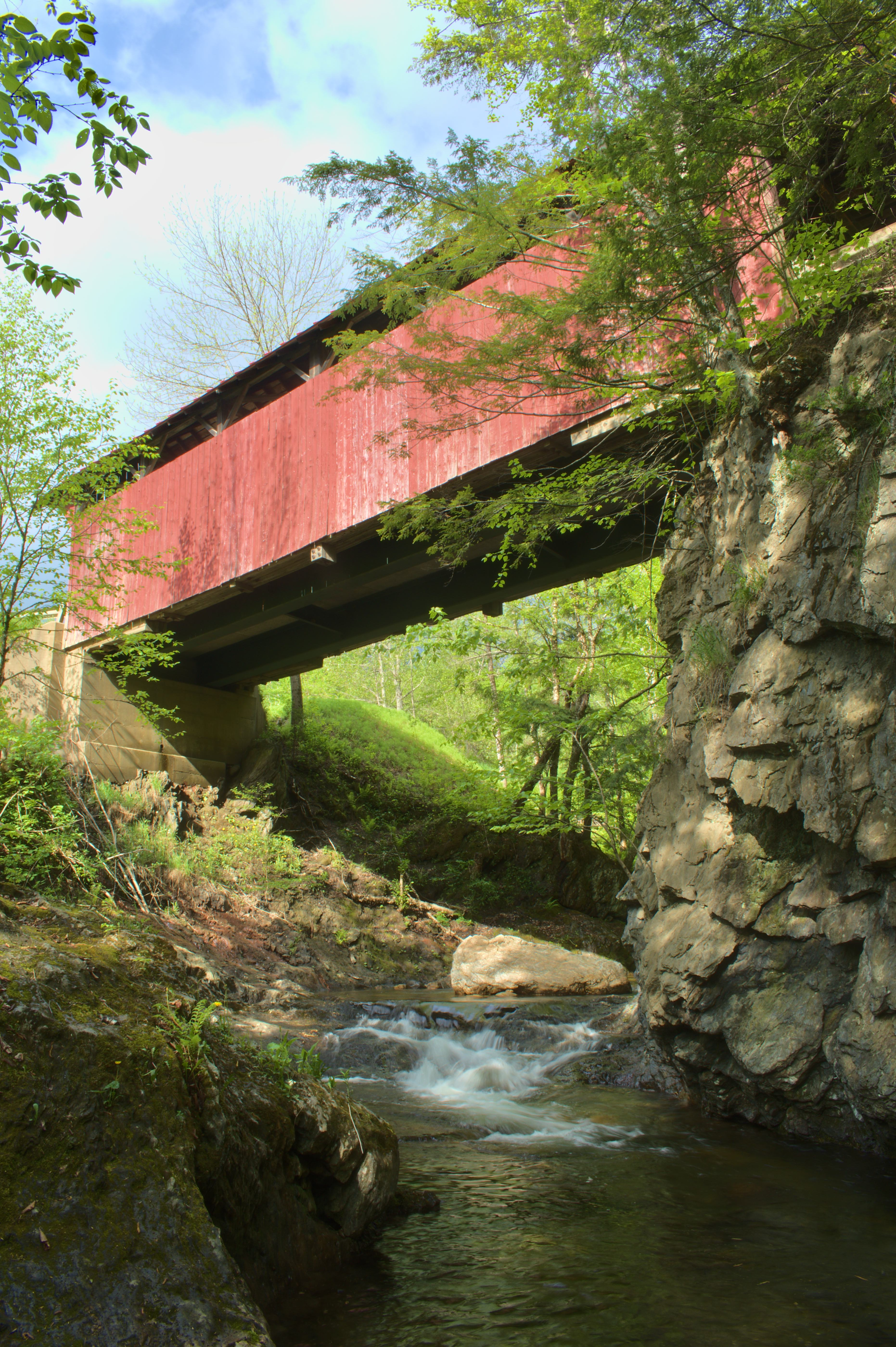

== See also ==
- List of covered bridges in Vermont
- National Register of Historic Places listings in Lamoille County, Vermont
- List of bridges on the National Register of Historic Places in Vermont
