= Burrington Covered Bridge =

- U.S. National Register of Historic Places
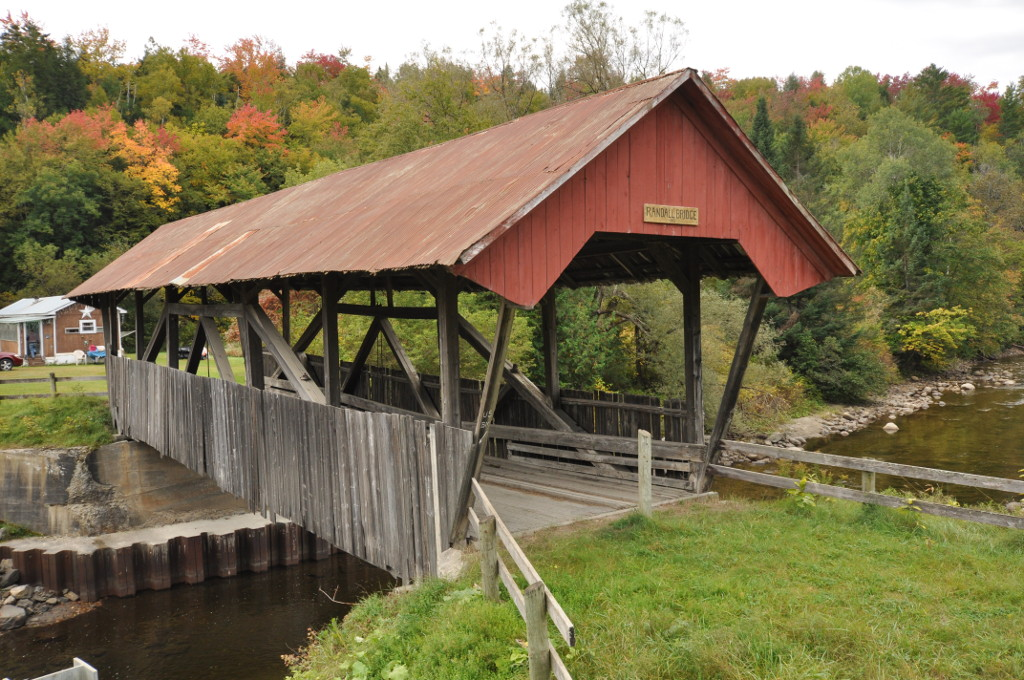

- Location within Vermont Location within the United States
- Location: Adjacent to Burrington Bridge Rd., off VT 114 northeast of Lyndon, Vermont
- Coordinates: 44°33′13″N 71°58′12″W
- Area: 1 acre (0.40 ha)
- Architectural style: queenpost truss
- NRHP reference No.: 74000203
- Added to NRHP: June 13, 1974

The Burrington Covered Bridge is a historic queenpost truss covered bridge in Lyndon, Vermont. Built in the 19th century, it is one of five covered bridges in Lyndon. It formerly carried Burrington Bridge Road across the Passumpsic River; it has been bypassed by a modern bridge. It was listed on the National Register of Historic Places in 1974.

== Description and history ==
The Burrington Covered Bridge is in a rural area northeast of downtown Lyndon, just south of Vermont Route 114 and west of Burrington Bridge Road. VT 114 parallels the Passumpsic River's north bank, and Burrington Bridge Road spans the river just upstream from the covered bridge. The bridge is a single-span queenpost truss structure, 68 feet (21 m) long and 15 feet (4.6 m) wide, with a 12.5 feet (3.8 m) roadway. It rests on abutments of either stone faced in concrete or rebuilt out of concrete. The bridge is covered by a gabled roof with wide eaves, and has vertical board siding rising about halfway up its sides. The trusses include iron rods running from the peaks of the diagonal bracing down to the truss's bottom chord. The bridge decking is wooden planking. The portals project beyond the ends of the trusses, and are faced in vertical board siding. The portal openings have diagonal corners.

The bridge is one of five surviving 19th-century covered bridges in Lyndon. All exhibit similar features: wide eaves, shortened siding, and projecting portals. This bridge was used until 1965, when the new bridge was built upstream.

== See also ==
- List of covered bridges in Vermont
- National Register of Historic Places listings in Caledonia County, Vermont
- List of bridges on the National Register of Historic Places in Vermont
