= Johnson Covered Bridge =

Johnson Covered Bridge can refer to

- Braley Covered Bridge in Randolph, Vermont
- Johnson Covered Bridge No. 28 in Cleveland Township, Columbia County, Pennsylvania
