= Coburn Covered Bridge =

- U.S. National Register of Historic Places
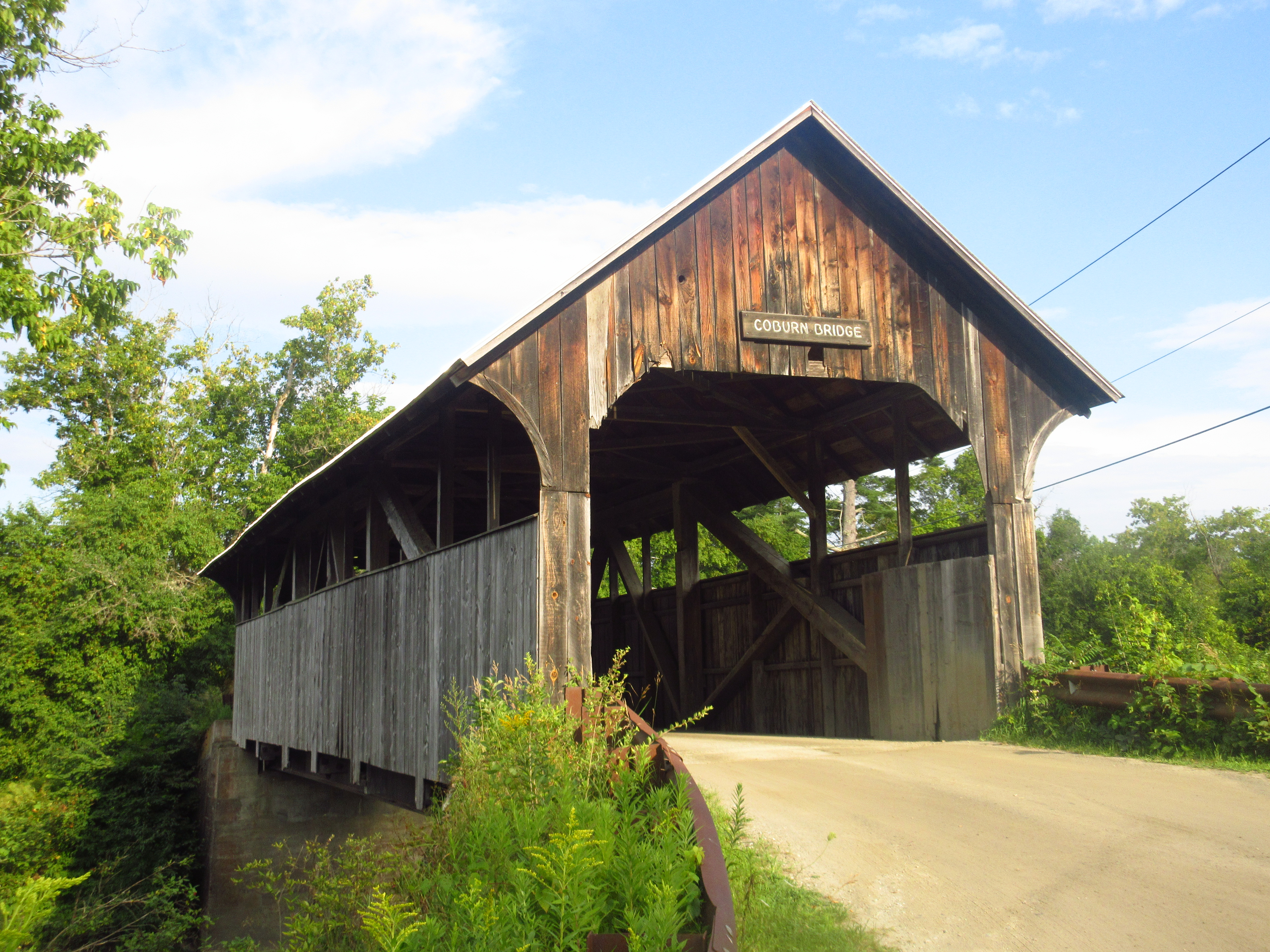

- Location within Vermont Location within the United States
- Location: Coburn Rd. over the Winooski River, East Montpelier, Vermont
- Coordinates: 44°16′51″N 72°27′18″W
- Area: 1 acre (0.40 ha)
- Built: 1851
- Architectural style: queenpost truss
- NRHP reference No.: 74000260
- Added to NRHP: October 9, 1974

The Coburn Covered Bridge is a historic covered bridge, carrying Coburn Road over the Winooski River in eastern East Montpelier, Vermont. Built in 1851, it is the town's only surviving 19th-century covered bridge. It was listed on the National Register of Historic Places in 1974.

== Description and history ==
The Coburn Covered Bridge stands in far eastern East Montpelier, about 2.7 miles (4.3 km) east of the town center. Coburn Road runs north from United States Route 2, roughly paralleling the south-flowing Winooski River and eventually crossing it. The bridge is oriented east-west, and is a single-span queenpost truss structure with embedded iron rods. It is 69.5 feet (21.2 m) long and 16.5 feet (5.0 m) wide, with a roadway width of 13.5 feet (4.1 m) (one lane), and rests on abutments of concrete and stone faced with concrete. The exterior side walls are sheathed in vertical board siding to a height of about 7 feet (2.1 m). The portals are sheathed to their full height in vertical siding, and have segmented-arch tops. The bridge roof is metal. The roadway deck consists of three steel beams carrying a concrete floor; this is the result of work done in the 1970s.

The bridge was built about 1851, and is the town's only covered bridge.

== See also ==
- National Register of Historic Places listings in Washington County, Vermont
- List of covered bridges in Vermont
- List of bridges on the National Register of Historic Places in Vermont
