= Chiselville Covered Bridge =

Covered bridge in Sunderland, Vermont, US

Coordinates: 43°04′20″N 73°08′00″W

The Chiselville Covered Bridge is a covered bridge over the Roaring Branch of the Batten Kill in Sunderland, Vermont. It bears a sign reading "One Dollar Fine for Driving Faster Than a Walk on This Bridge."

== Description and history ==
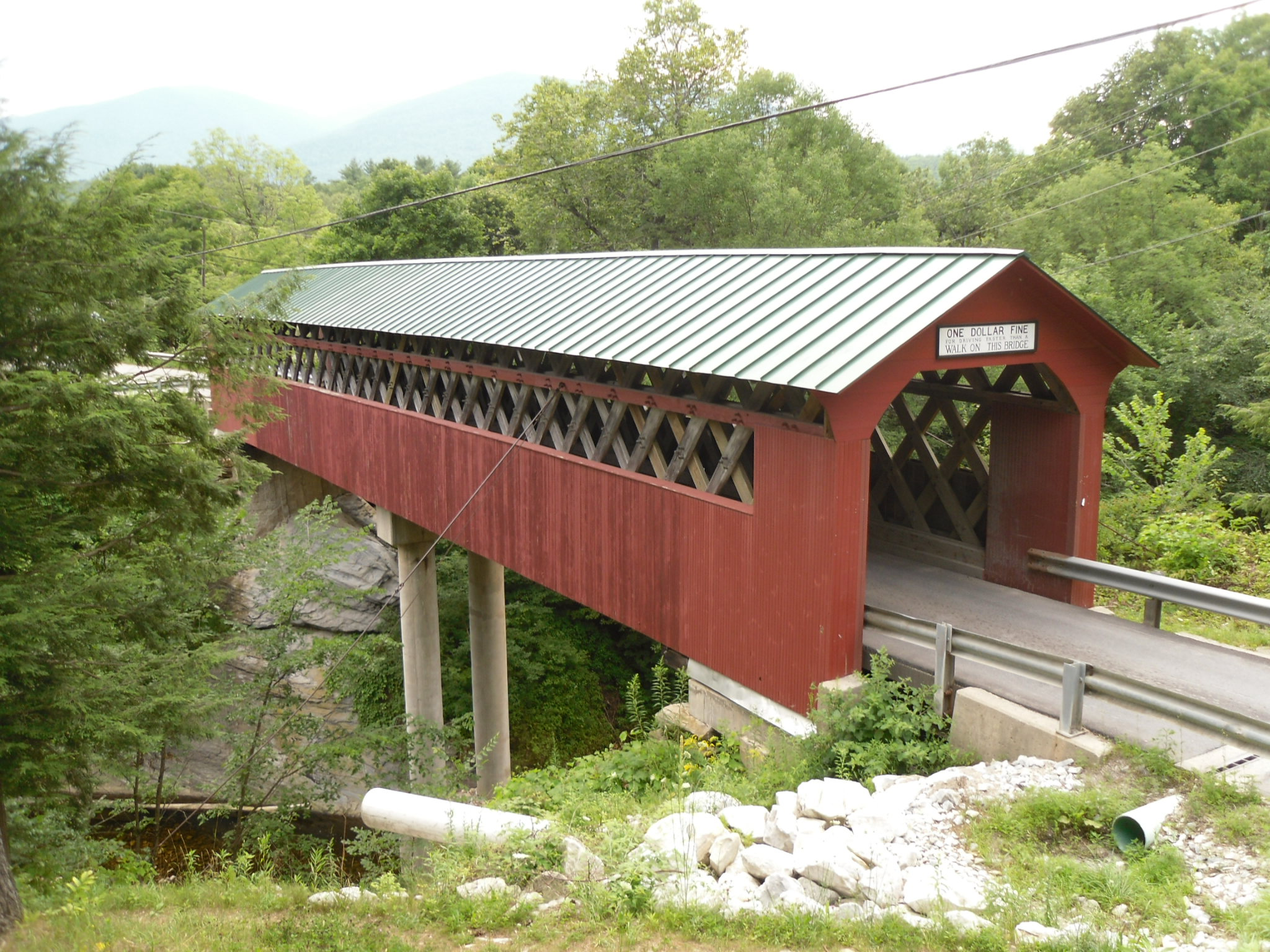
Chiselville Covered Bridge

The bridge was built 1870 by Daniel Oatman.

It is a lattice truss bridge design, with additional steel I-beams which were installed in 1973 after damage caused by two overweight gravel trucks in 1971.

== Popular culture ==
The bridge was featured in the 1987 film Baby Boom.

== See also ==
- List of Vermont covered bridges
