= Browns River Covered Bridge =

Covered bridge in Vermont

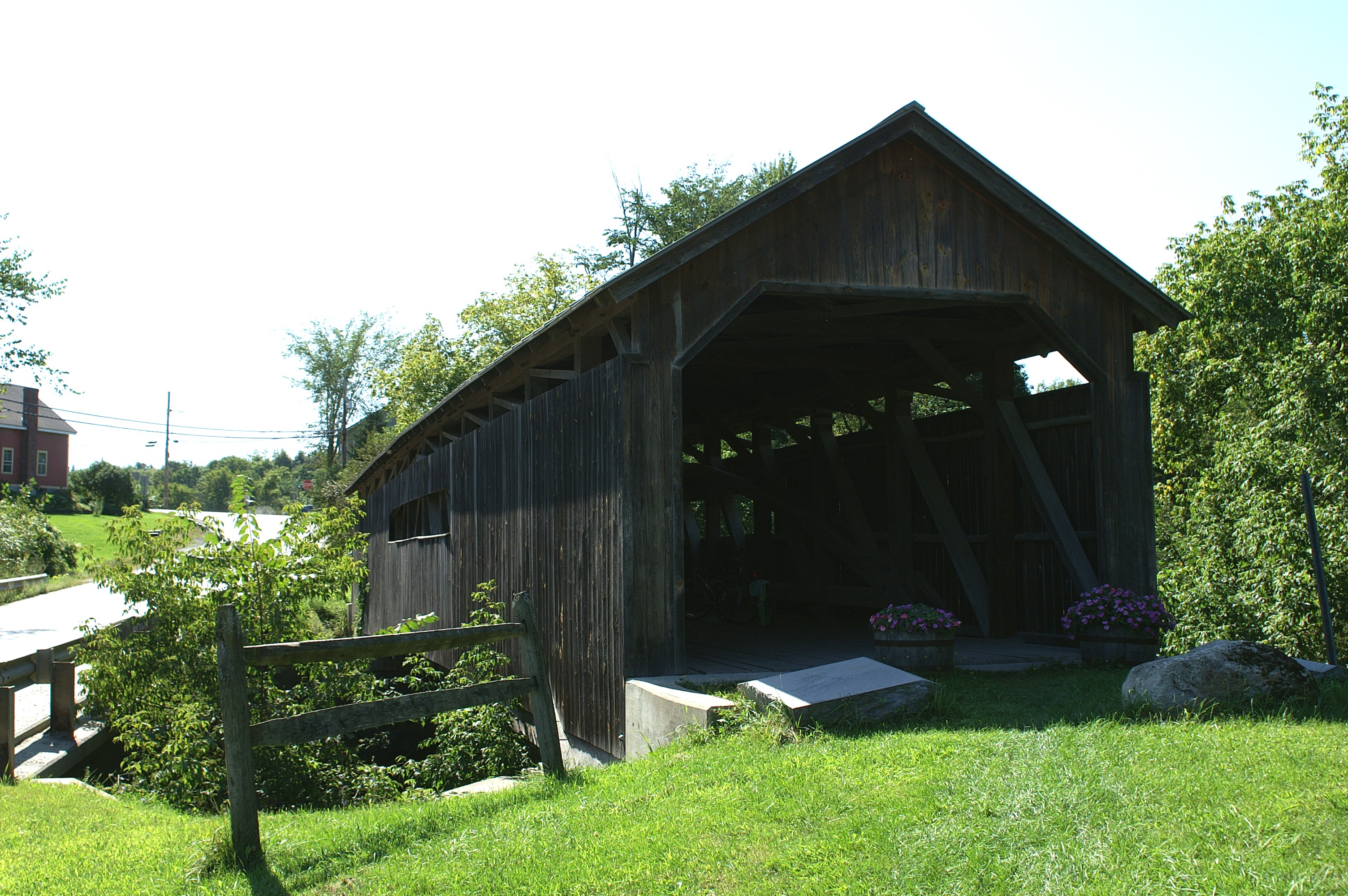
- Coordinates: 44°36′45″N 73°00′29″W
- Carries: Pedestrian (closed to motor traffic)
- Crosses: Browns River
- Locale: Westford, Vermont
- Maintained by: Town of Westford
- ID number: VT-04-05

Characteristics
- Design: Covered, Burr arch
- Material: Wood
- Total length: 97 ft (30 m)
- No. of spans: 1

History
- Constructed by: unknown
- Construction end: 1838

The Browns River Covered Bridge, also called the Westford Covered Bridge, is a covered bridge that crosses Browns River off State Route 128 in Westford, Vermont.

The bridge is of Burr arch design by an unknown builder.

== Recent history ==
The bridge was closed to traffic in the 1960s, and was bypassed by a concrete bridge alongside. In 1976 some repair work was done by the Vermont Naval Reserve and volunteers from the town. But even that work was not enough and the bridge was closed to even foot traffic. In 1987 the firm of Graton Associates was hired to rehabilitate the bridge. The ensuing work was filmed by a crew from National Geographic doing a piece on Milton Graton's life as a bridge restorer. The bridge was rededicated in 2001, although it remains closed to motor traffic at this time.

The article found at The Browns River Bridge - a Covered Bridge Preservation Story has a very comprehensive recounting of the work performed.

== See also ==
- List of covered bridges in Vermont
