= Robbins Nest Covered Bridge =

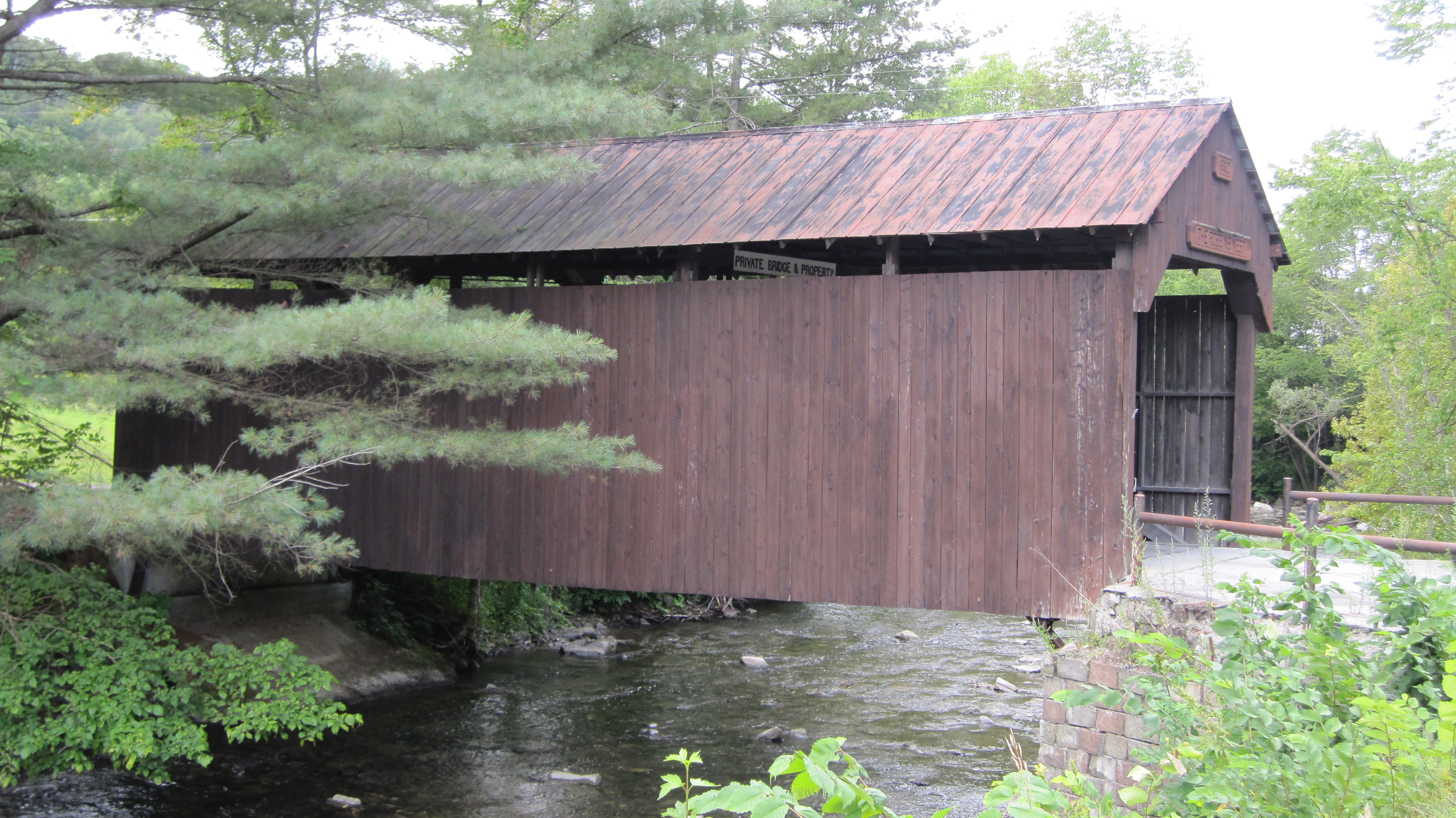
- Coordinates: 44°10′46″N 72°28′15″W
- Carries: Automobile (closed to public)
- Crosses: Jail Branch of Winooski River
- Locale: Barre, Vermont
- Maintained by: private
- ID number: VT-12-18

Characteristics
- Design: Covered, queen post
- Material: Wood
- Total length: 50.25 ft (15.32 m)
- Width: 12.8 ft (3.9 m)
- No. of spans: 1

History
- Constructed by: Robert R. Robbins
- Construction end: 1962

The Robbins Nest Covered Bridge is a covered bridge that crosses the Jail Branch of the Winooski River off US Route 302 in Barre, Vermont.

The bridge is of queen post design built by Robert R. Robbins. Even though not historic, the bridge was built as a replica to one that stood just downstream and was swept away in the Vermont flood of 1927, and is of authentic design and construction. Ownership of the property has transferred at least once, and in 1990 the owners installed steel beams to reinforce the deck.
