= Gifford Covered Bridge =

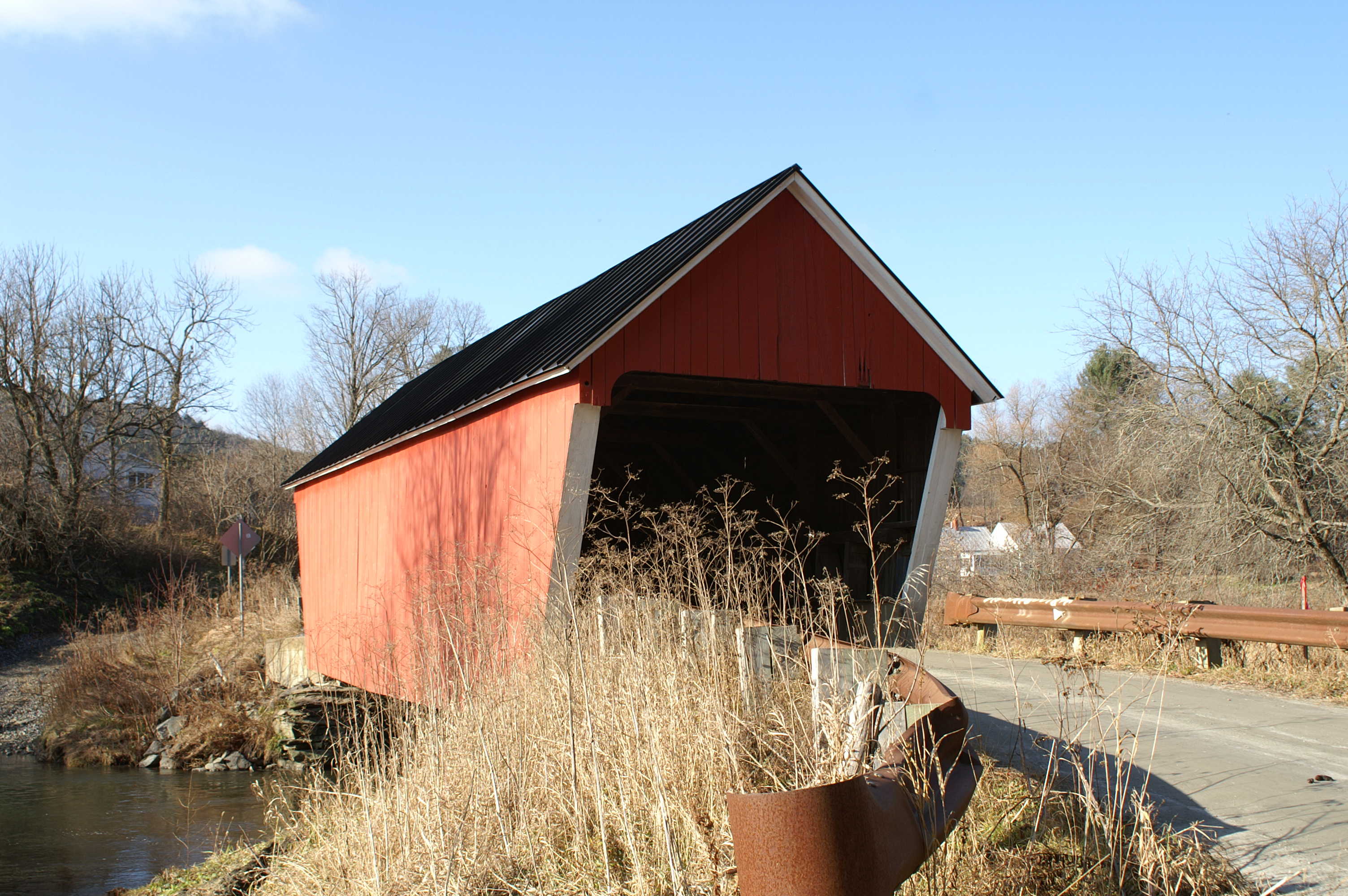
- Coordinates: 43°54′58″N 72°33′18″W
- Carries: Automobile
- Crosses: Second Branch of White River
- Locale: Randolph, Vermont
- Maintained by: Town of Randolph
- ID number: VT-09-03

Characteristics
- Design: Covered, King post
- Material: Wood
- Total length: 54.75 ft (16.69 m)
- Width: 14.8 ft (4.51 m)
- No. of spans: 1
- Load limit: 3 tons
- Clearance above: 10 ft (3.0 m)

History
- Constructed by: unknown
- Construction end: 1904
- Gifford Covered Bridge
- U.S. National Register of Historic Places
- Location within Vermont Location within the United States
- Coordinates: 43.91619°N 72.55504°W
- Area: 1 acre (0.4 ha)
- NRHP reference No.: 74000240
- Added to NRHP: July 30, 1974

The Gifford Covered Bridge, also called the C.K. Smith Covered Bridge, is a wooden covered bridge that crosses the Second Branch of the White River in Randolph, Vermont on Hyde Road. It was listed on the National Register of Historic Places in 1974. It is one of two bridges in the state that was uncovered when first built, its trusses boxed for shelter.

== Description and history ==
The Gifford Covered Bridge is located in a rural setting on the far east side of Randolph. It is a short way east of Vermont Route 14, carrying Hyde Road across the Second Branch White River. It is a single-span King post truss structure, 51.5 feet (15.7 m) long, with a roadway width of 14.5 feet (4.4 m) (one lane) and a total width of 17 feet (5.2 m). It is set on concrete abutments, and is covered by an independent post-and-beam structure. The portal ends of the structure extend beyond the trusses, and it is covered by a metal roof, with vertical board siding.

The bridge's construction date and builder are not known. It is one of only two covered bridges in Vermont (the other being the nearby Braley Covered Bridge) in which the king-post truss reaches only half the height of the bridge. The reason for this is that the bridge was most likely built uncovered, its trusses covered by planking to protect them from the elements. It was later covered (c. 1904) by the existing post-and-beam structure.

Circa 1955 the bridge deck was reinforced with steel Ɪ-beams above the roadway which are in turn tied to Ɪ-beams below, a relatively unusual way of strengthening a covered bridge. In 2001, extensive repairs were made to the bridge, including raising it up from the river to help prevent flood waters from reaching the deck. Despite the repairs, a relatively low weight limit of 3 tons remains on the bridge. There is evidence that the weight limit is forcing heavy vehicles to ford the shallow river next to the bridge.

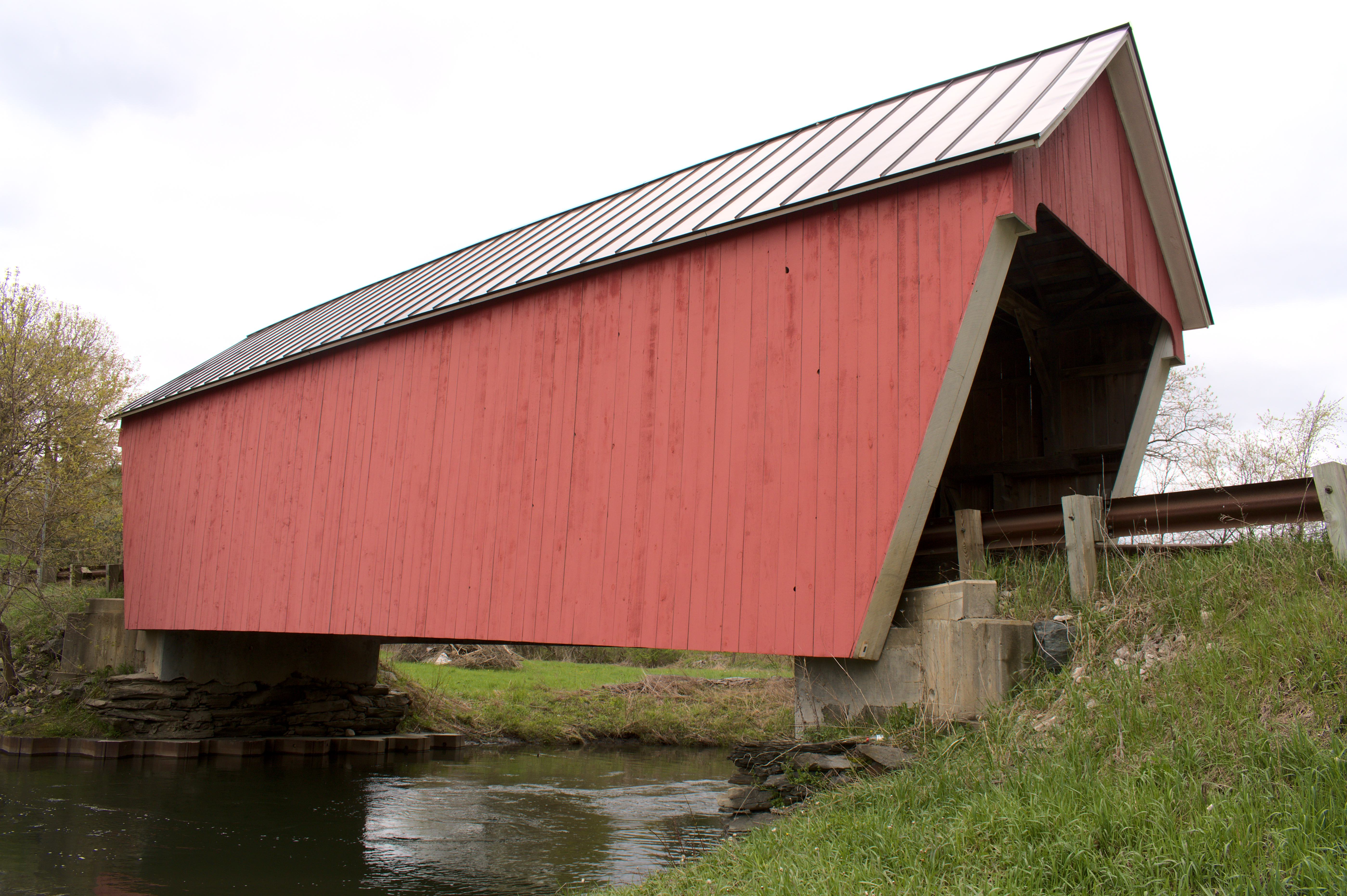

== See also ==
- National Register of Historic Places listings in Orange County, Vermont
- List of Vermont covered bridges
- List of bridges on the National Register of Historic Places in Vermont
