= Cedar Swamp Covered Bridge =

- U.S. National Register of Historic Places
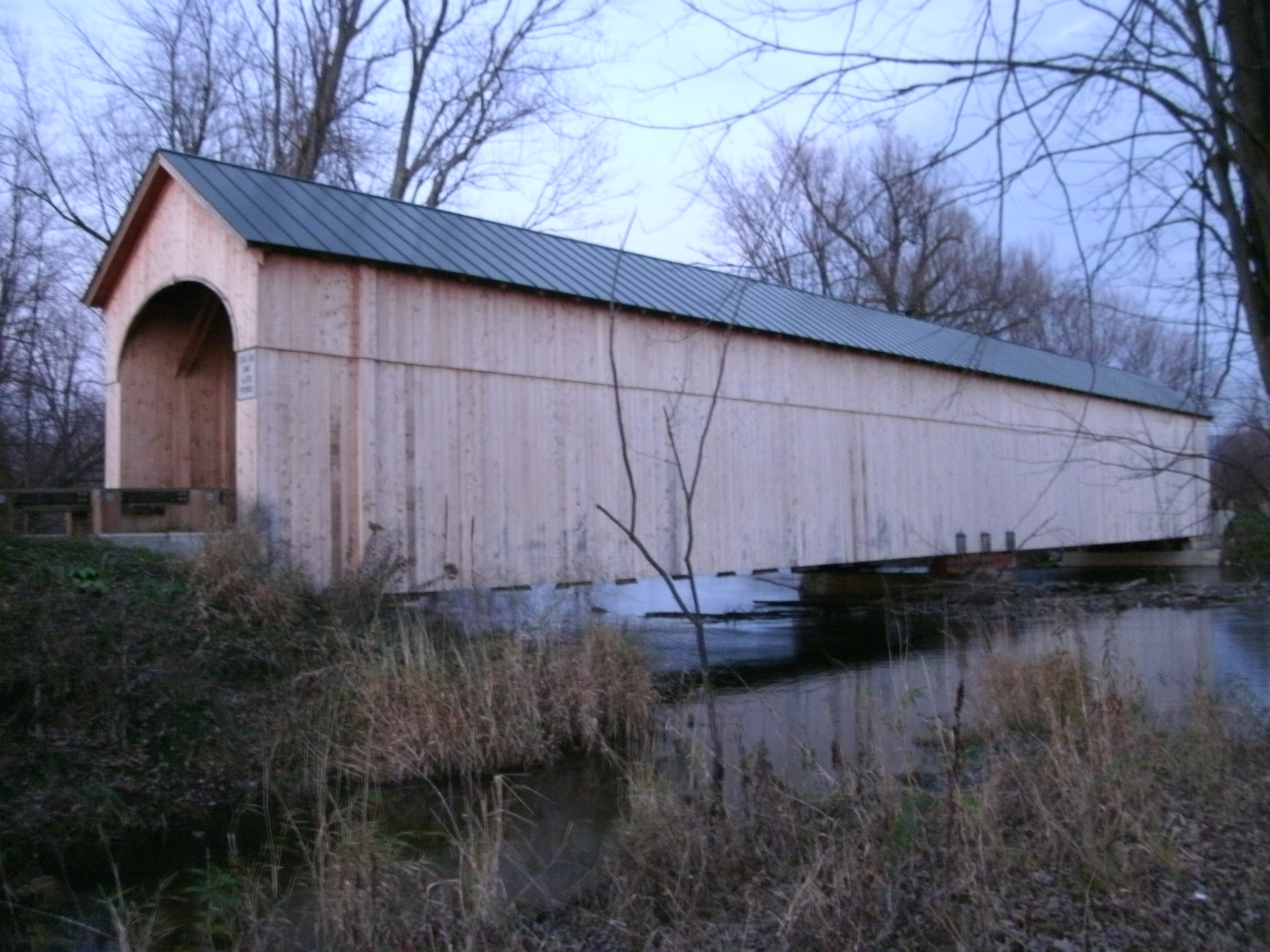

- Location within Vermont Location within the United States
- Location: Swamp Creek Road over Otter Creek, between Cornwall and Salisbury, Vermont
- Coordinates: 43°55′6″N 73°10′28″W
- Area: 1 acre (0.40 ha)
- Built: 1864
- Architectural style: Town lattice truss
- NRHP reference No.: 74000386
- Added to NRHP: September 10, 1974

The Cedar Swamp Covered Bridge, also known as the Station Bridge and by various other names, was a historic wooden covered bridge spanning Otter Creek between Cornwall and Salisbury, Vermont. The Town lattice truss bridge was built in 1864-1865 and added to the National Register of Historic Places in 1974. It was destroyed by fire in September 2016.

== Description and history ==
The Cedar Swamp Covered Bridge stood in a rural area of southeastern Cornwall and western Salisbury, connecting Cornwall's Swamp Road with Salisbury's Creek Road. The bridge was a Town lattice truss structure, built as a single span 153.5 feet (46.8 m) long. It rested on abutments of marble that had were faced in concrete, and was supported near its center by a concrete pier added in 1969. The bridge was 18.5 feet (5.6 m) wide, with a roadway width of 14 feet (4.3 m) (one lane). Its exterior was finished in vertical board siding, which extended a short way on the inside of each portal. The portal openings were shaped as elliptical arches, and it was capped by a metal roof.

Built in 1864-65, the bridge was one of Vermont's few covered bridges which spanned town lines, and was the only surviving 19th-century covered bridge in both Cornwall and Salisbury. Refurbished in 2007-2008, the bridge was severely damaged by fire on September 10, 2016.

== See also ==
- National Register of Historic Places listings in Addison County, Vermont
- List of Vermont covered bridges
- List of bridges on the National Register of Historic Places in Vermont
