= Upper Falls Covered Bridge =

- U.S. National Register of Historic Places
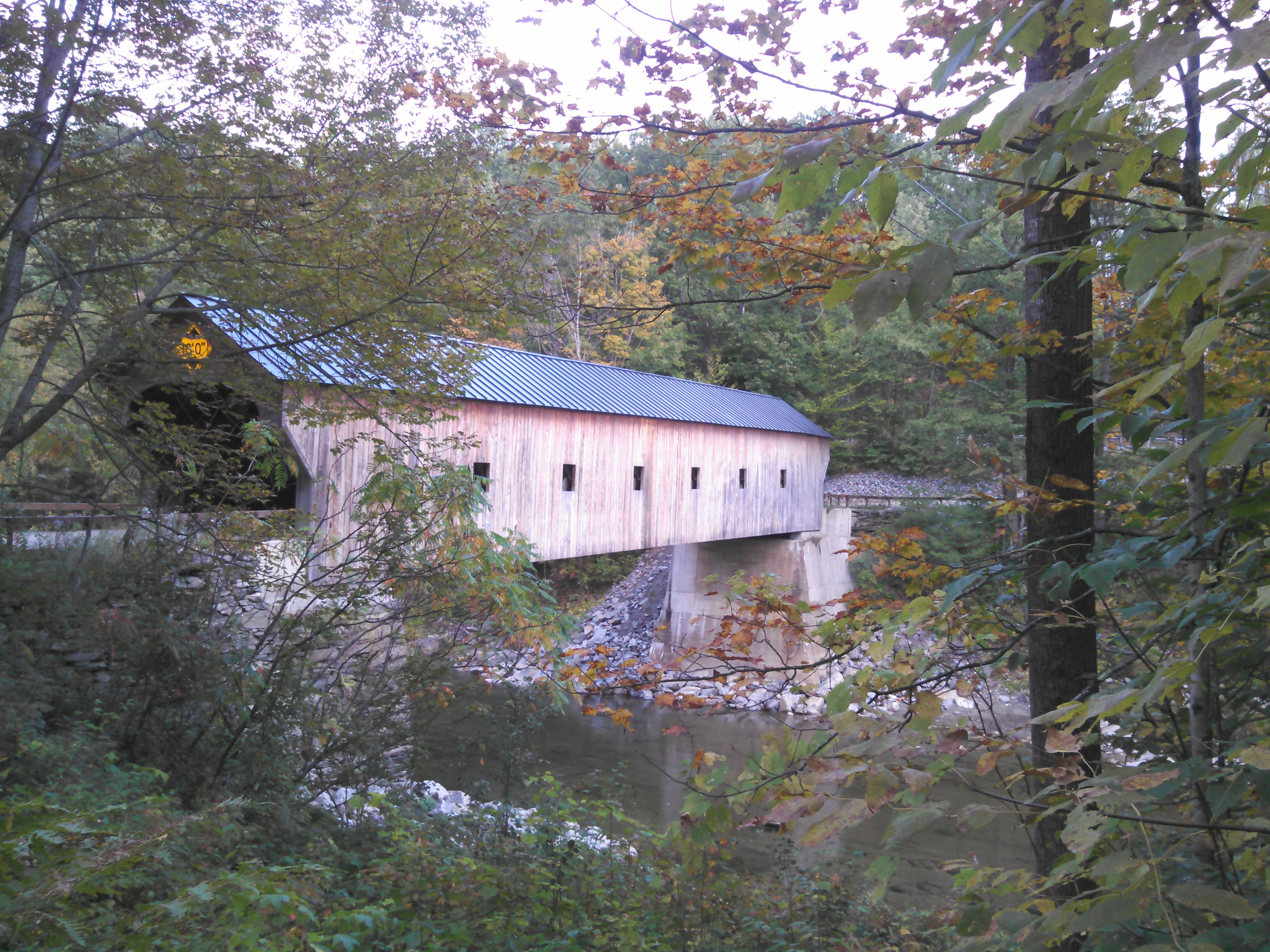

- Location within Vermont Location within the United States
- Location: Upper Falls Rd., S of VT 131 across the Black River, Weathersfield, Vermont
- Coordinates: 43°23′55″N 72°31′21″W
- Area: 1 acre (0.40 ha)
- Built: 1870
- Architectural style: Town lattice truss
- NRHP reference No.: 73000215
- Added to NRHP: August 28, 1973

The Upper Falls Covered Bridge, also known as the Downers Covered Bridge, spans the Black River, carrying Upper Falls Road just south of Vermont Route 131 in western Weathersfield, Vermont. The Town lattice truss bridge was built in 1840 and rebuilt in 2008. Its gable ends are distinctive for their Greek Revival styling. The bridge was listed on the National Register of Historic Places in 1973.

== Description and history ==
The Upper Falls Covered Bridge is located in a rural area of western Weathersfield, south of Vermont 131 on Upper Falls Road. It is a single-span Town lattice truss structure, set on one modern concrete abutment, and another of dry laid stone that has been faced in concrete. It is 120 feet (37 m) long with a gabled overhang of 4 feet (1.2 m) at each end, and is 18.5 feet (5.6 m) wide with a roadway width of 15 feet (4.6 m) (one lane). The sides of the bridge are clad in vertical board siding. Square window holes are cut into each side of the exterior. The bridge is covered by a metal roof. The gable ends of the portals are finished in horizontally laid boards, with partial gable returns and a triangular line of moulding, a nod to Greek Revival architecture popular at the time of its construction.

The bridge was built in 1840 by James Tasker of Claremont, New Hampshire. It is distinctive among Vermont's many surviving covered bridges for the Greek Revival elements of its gables, and for the remarkably good condition of the surviving stone abutment, which has precisely laid stonework. At the time of its National Register listing in 1973 it was not in very good condition; it underwent a complete reconstruction in 2008.

== See also ==
- National Register of Historic Places listings in Windsor County, Vermont
- List of Vermont covered bridges
- List of bridges on the National Register of Historic Places in Vermont
