= Spade Farm Covered Bridge =

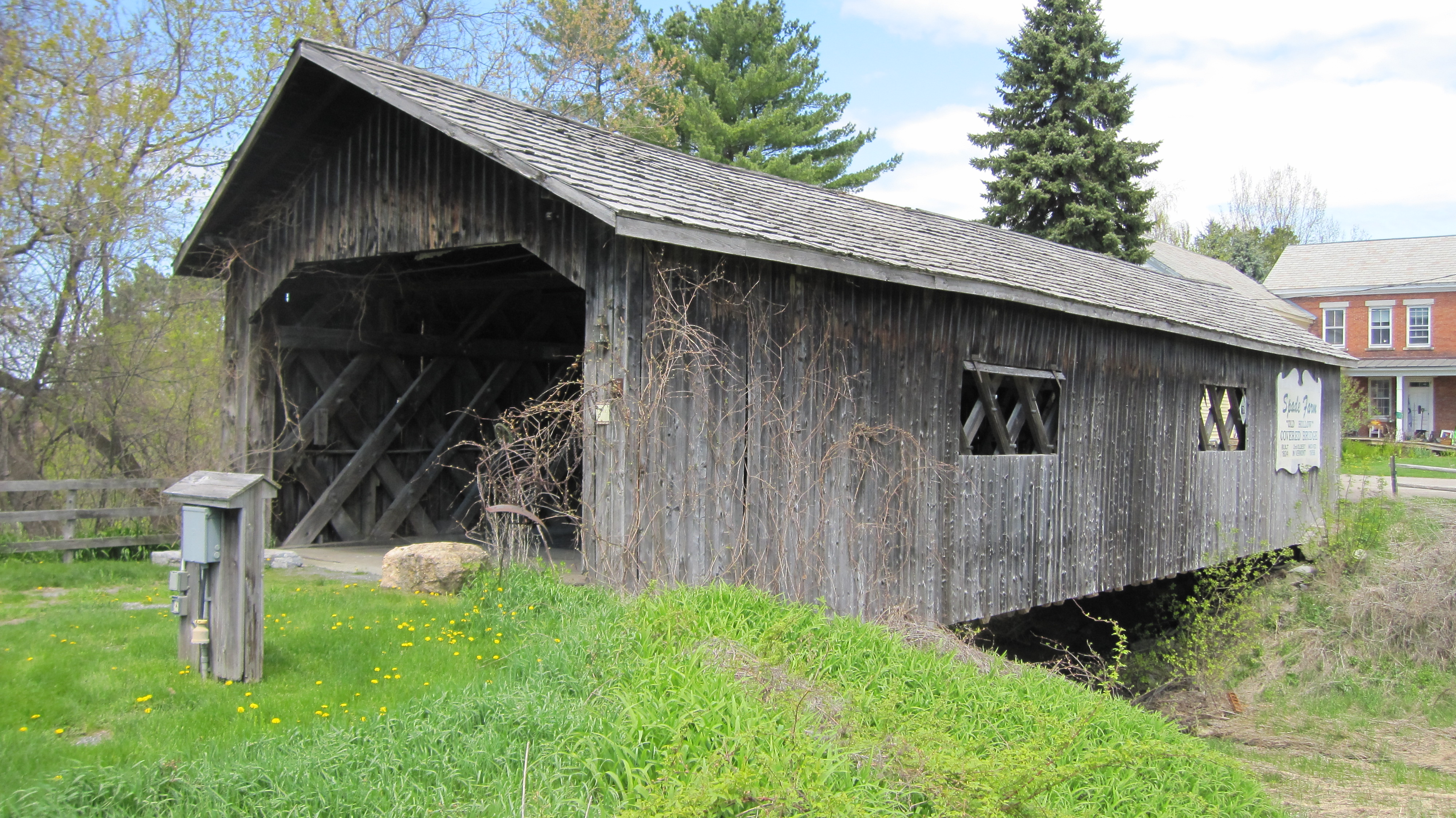
- Coordinates: 44°14′29″N 73°13′59″W
- Carries: Pedestrian (closed to motor traffic)
- Crosses: storm drainage ditch
- Locale: Ferrisburgh, Vermont
- Maintained by: private
- ID number: VT-01-02

Characteristics
- Design: Covered, Town lattice
- Material: Wood
- Total length: 85.5 ft (26.1 m)
- Width: 17.3 ft (5.3 m)
- No. of spans: 1

History
- Constructed by: Justin Miller
- Construction end: 1850

Location
- Interactive map of Spade Farm Covered Bridge

The Spade Farm Covered Bridge, also called the Old Hollow Covered Bridge is a covered bridge that crosses a storm drainage ditch off U.S. Route 7 in Ferrisburgh, Vermont.

The bridge is of Town lattice and was built by Justin Miller.

== Recent history ==
The Spade Farm Covered Bridge was originally located in North Ferrisburgh, Vermont on Old Hollow Road (hence its other name). In 1958 a local farmer, Sam Spade, asked to have it moved to his farm after it was slated to be dismantled and replaced by a modern bridge. Despite the sign on the bridge stating a build date of 1824, historians say a date of 1850 is more likely. The bridge is still privately owned and falling into disrepair since it is no longer available for state or federal funding. Despite the disrepair, there are numerous examples of period advertising on the truss members.
