= Warren, Vermont =

- Town
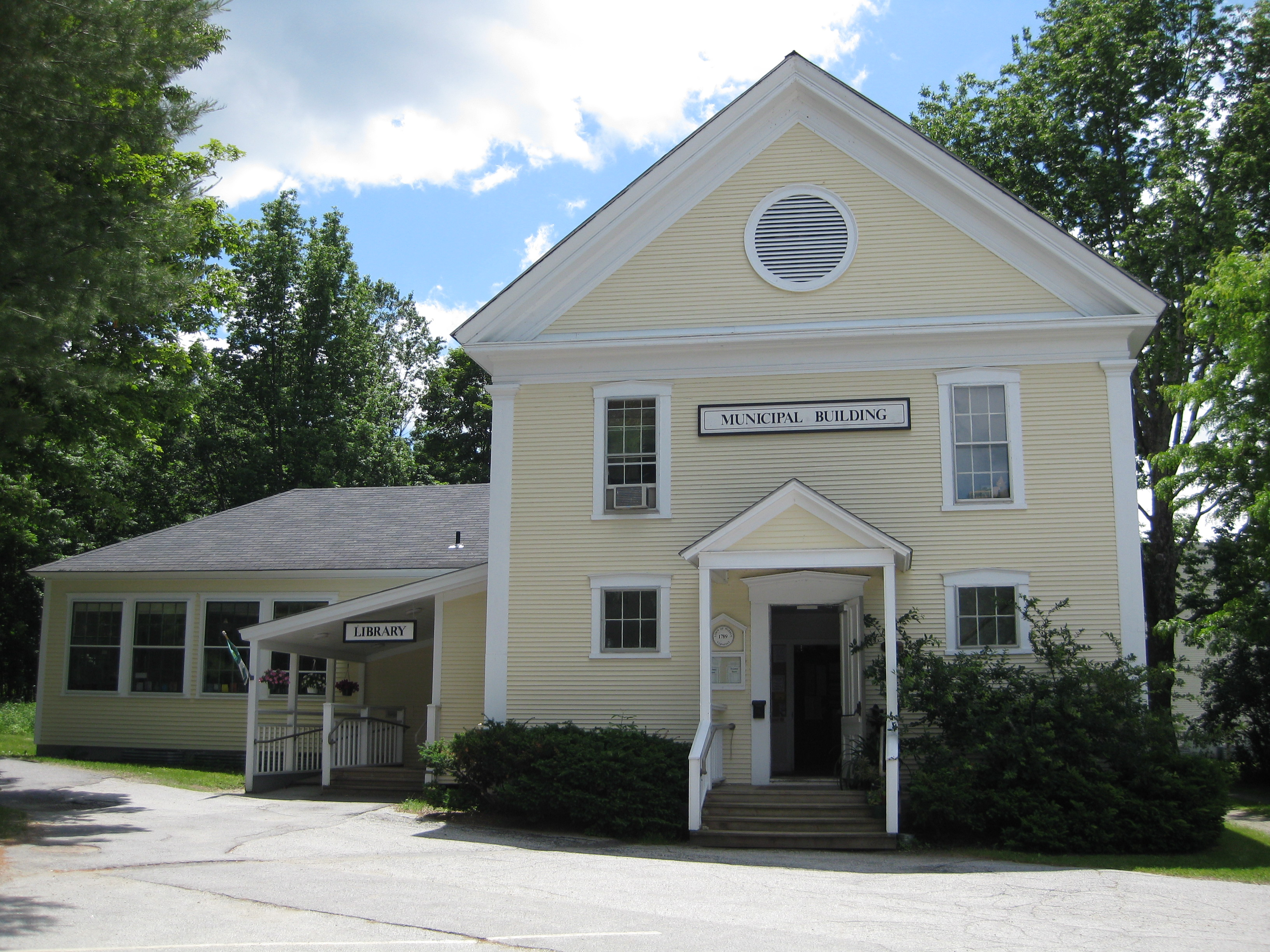
- Warren Municipal Building

- Location in Washington County and the state of Vermont
- Coordinates: 44°07′05″N 72°52′40″W
- Country: United States
- State: Vermont
- County: Washington
- Communities: Warren; East Warren; Alpine Village

Area
  - Total: 40.0 sq mi (103.5 km^{2})
  - Land: 39.9 sq mi (103.4 km^{2})
  - Water: 0.039 sq mi (0.1 km^{2})
- Elevation: 1,063 ft (324 m)

Population (2020)
  - Total: 1,977
  - Density: 49.52/sq mi (19.12/km^{2})
- Time zone: UTC-5 (Eastern (EST))
  - Summer (DST): UTC-4 (EDT)
- ZIP code: 05674
- Area code: 802
- FIPS code: 50-76525
- GNIS feature ID: 1462242
- Website: www.warrenvt.org

Warren is a town in Washington County, Vermont, United States. The population was 1,977 at the 2020 census. The center of population of Vermont is located in Warren. It is set between the two ranges of the Green Mountains, with approximately 25% of the town within the boundaries of the federal Green Mountain National Forest.

Sugarbush Resort is a local ski resort in the town. The Long Trail, a hiking trail running from the border with Massachusetts to the Canada–US border, traverses the town.

== History ==
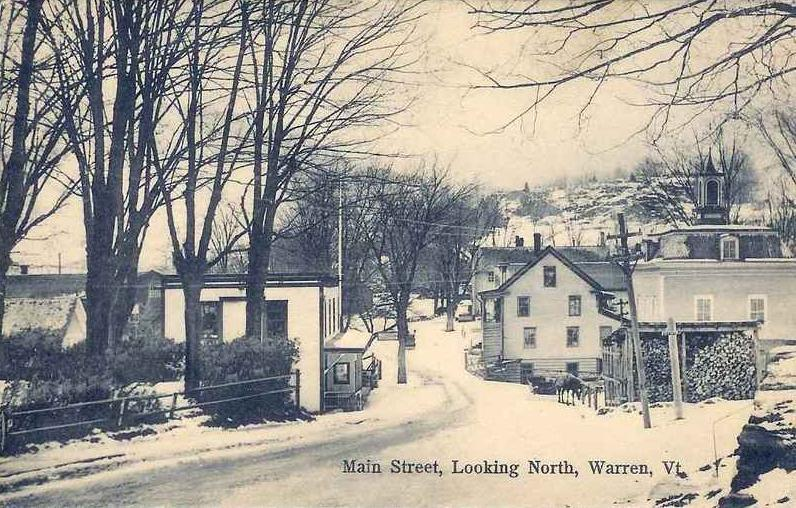
Main Street c. 1910

Granted on November 9, 1780, Warren was chartered on October 20, 1789, to John Throop and 67 others. It was named for Dr. Joseph Warren, Revolutionary War patriot. The first settlers, Samuel Lard and Seth Leavitt, arrived in 1797. Grain and lumber mills were built on the Mad River to grind grain or manufacture lumber and clapboards. On the fertile intervales, farmers grew hay. By 1839, when the town's population was 766, cattle and about 4000 sheep grazed the hills. Milk and maple syrup were important commodity goods.

In the late 1930s, the area began to be developed for recreational skiing.The first ski tow was erected in the Mad River Valley by the Warren Outing Club.

In 1958, Damon Gadd and Jack Murphy founded Sugarbush Ski Area on the northeast side of Lincoln Peak. They had a three-seat gondola installed; at that time it was the nation's longest lift. It was manufactured in Italy. Eventually this developed into what is today Sugarbush Resort, a tourist destination.

== Geography ==
According to the United States Census Bureau, the town has a total area of 40.0 square miles (103.5 km^{2}), of which 39.9 square miles (103.4 km^{2}) is land and 0.04 square miles (0.1 km^{2}), or 0.12%, is water. Warren is drained by the Mad River, a tributary of the Winooski River which flows to Lake Champlain.

The town is crossed by Vermont Route 100 and served by Warren-Sugarbush Airport. Warren-Sugarbush Airport is a public-use airport to the east of Warren.

== Demographics ==
Historical population
Census	Pop.	Note	%±
1800	58		—
1810	229		294.8%
1820	320		39.7%
1830	766		139.4%
1840	943		23.1%
1850	962		2.0%
1860	1,041		8.2%
1870	1,008		−3.2%
1880	951		−5.7%
1890	866		−8.9%
1900	826		−4.6%
1910	825		−0.1%
1920	654		−20.7%
1930	486		−25.7%
1940	450		−7.4%
1950	498		10.7%
1960	469		−5.8%
1970	588		25.4%
1980	956		62.6%
1990	1,172		22.6%
2000	1,681		43.4%
2010	1,705		1.4%
2020	1,977		16.0%
U.S. Decennial Census

As of the census of 2000, there were 1,681 people, 742 households, and 437 families residing in the town. The population density was 42.0 people per square mile (16.2/km^{2}). There were 2,078 housing units at an average density of 51.9 per square mile (20.0/km^{2}). The racial makeup of the town was 97.98% White, 0.18% African American, 0.36% Native American, 0.24% Asian, 0.06% from other races, and 1.19% from two or more races. Hispanic or Latino of any race were 1.01% of the population.

There were 742 households, out of which 28.3% had children under the age of 18 living with them, 50.1% were married couples living together, 5.9% had a female householder with no husband present, and 41.1% were non-families. 31.3% of all households were made up of individuals, and 5.9% had someone living alone who was 65 years of age or older. The average household size was 2.27 and the average family size was 2.89.

In the town, the population was spread out, with 22.9% under the age of 18, 5.1% from 18 to 24, 30.8% from 25 to 44, 31.6% from 45 to 64, and 9.6% who were 65 years of age or older. The median age was 40 years. For every 100 females, there were 106.3 males. For every 100 females age 18 and over, there were 108.7 males.

The median income for a household in the town was $47,438, and the median income for a family was $57,206. Males had a median income of $32,054 versus $25,588 for females. The per capita income for the town was $30,405. About 5.1% of families and 8.0% of the population were below the poverty line, including 8.3% of those under age 18 and 3.8% of those age 65 or over.

== Education ==
It is in the Harwood Unified Union School District. The comprehensive high school of the district is the Harwood Union Middle and High School.

== Site of interest ==
- Warren Covered Bridge
