= Braley Covered Bridge =

Historic covered bridge in Vermont

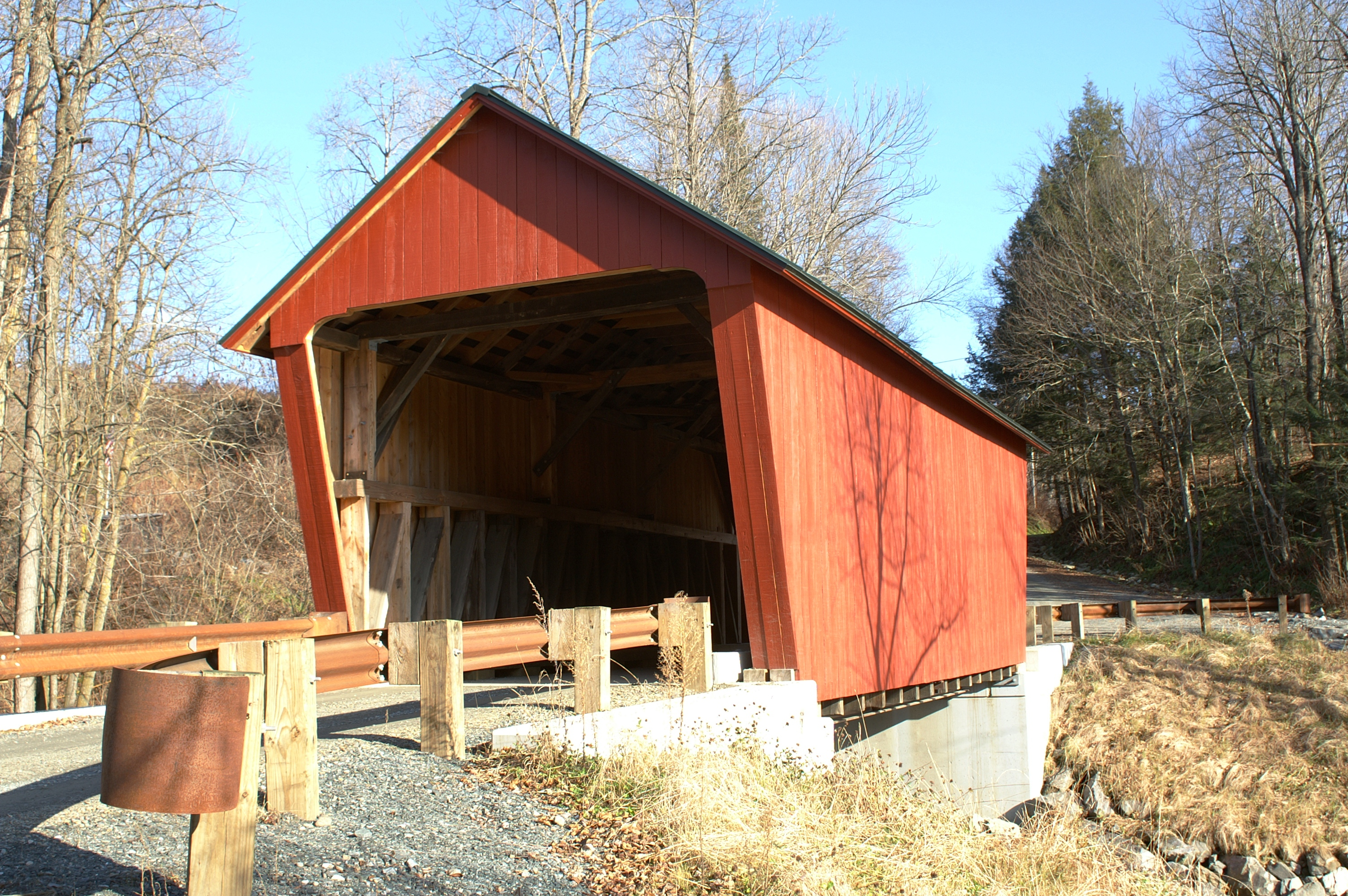
- Braley Covered Bridge in the town of Randolph Vermont.
- Coordinates: 43°55′42″N 72°33′26″W
- Carries: Automobile
- Crosses: Second Branch of White River
- Locale: Randolph, Vermont
- Official name: The Braley Covered Bridge
- Maintained by: Town of Randolph
- ID number: VT-09-04

Characteristics
- Design: Covered, King post
- Material: Wood
- Total length: 40.25 ft (12.3 m)
- Width: 14.2 ft (4.3 m)
- No. of spans: 1
- Load limit: 8 tons
- Clearance above: 9.5 ft (2.90 m)

History
- Constructed by: unknown
- Construction end: 1904
- Braley Covered Bridge
- U.S. National Register of Historic Places
- Area: 1 acre (0.40 ha)
- NRHP reference No.: 74000236
- Added to NRHP: June 13, 1974

Location
- Interactive map of Braley Covered Bridge

The Braley Covered Bridge, also called the Johnson Covered Bridge and Upper Blaisdell Covered Bridge, is a wooden covered bridge that crosses the Second Branch of the White River in Randolph, Vermont on Braley Covered Bridge Road. It was listed on the National Register of Historic Places in 1974. The bridge was built in 1904 as an uncovered kingspost truss bridge, and was covered in 1909.

== Description and history ==
The Braley Covered Bridge is located in a rural area of eastern Randolph, on Braley Covered Bridge Road, a dead-end spur running west from Vermont Route 14 to the Second Branch White River. It is a single-span multiple king post structure, 39 feet (12 m) in length and resting on dry-laid stone abutments. It is 17 feet (5.2 m) wide, with a 14-foot (4.3 m) roadway width (one lane). The bridge has been strengthened by the addition of steel I-beams beneath the deck. The superstructure of the bridge is a post-and-beam structure clad in vertical board siding. The portals extend about 3 feet (0.91 m) beyond the ends of the trusses.

The bridge was built in 1904 by an unknown designer. This bridge is one of only two covered bridges in Vermont (the other being the nearby Gifford Covered Bridge) in which the king post truss reaches only half the height of the bridge. The reason for this is that the bridge was most likely a wooden boxed pony truss bridge when built. The trusses would have most likely been covered by planking to protect them, rather than being left open. See the article on Mean's Ford Bridge in Pennsylvania at BridgeHunter.com for an example of this rare type of bridge.

A date of 1909 was placed on one of the portals, likely an indication that the covering superstructure of the bridge was installed at that time, making it a covered bridge in the more familiar sense. The I-beam reinforcement of the bridge deck took place in 1977.

== See also ==
- National Register of Historic Places listings in Orange County, Vermont
- List of Vermont covered bridges
- List of bridges on the National Register of Historic Places in Vermont
