= Old Schoolhouse Bridge =

- U.S. National Register of Historic Places
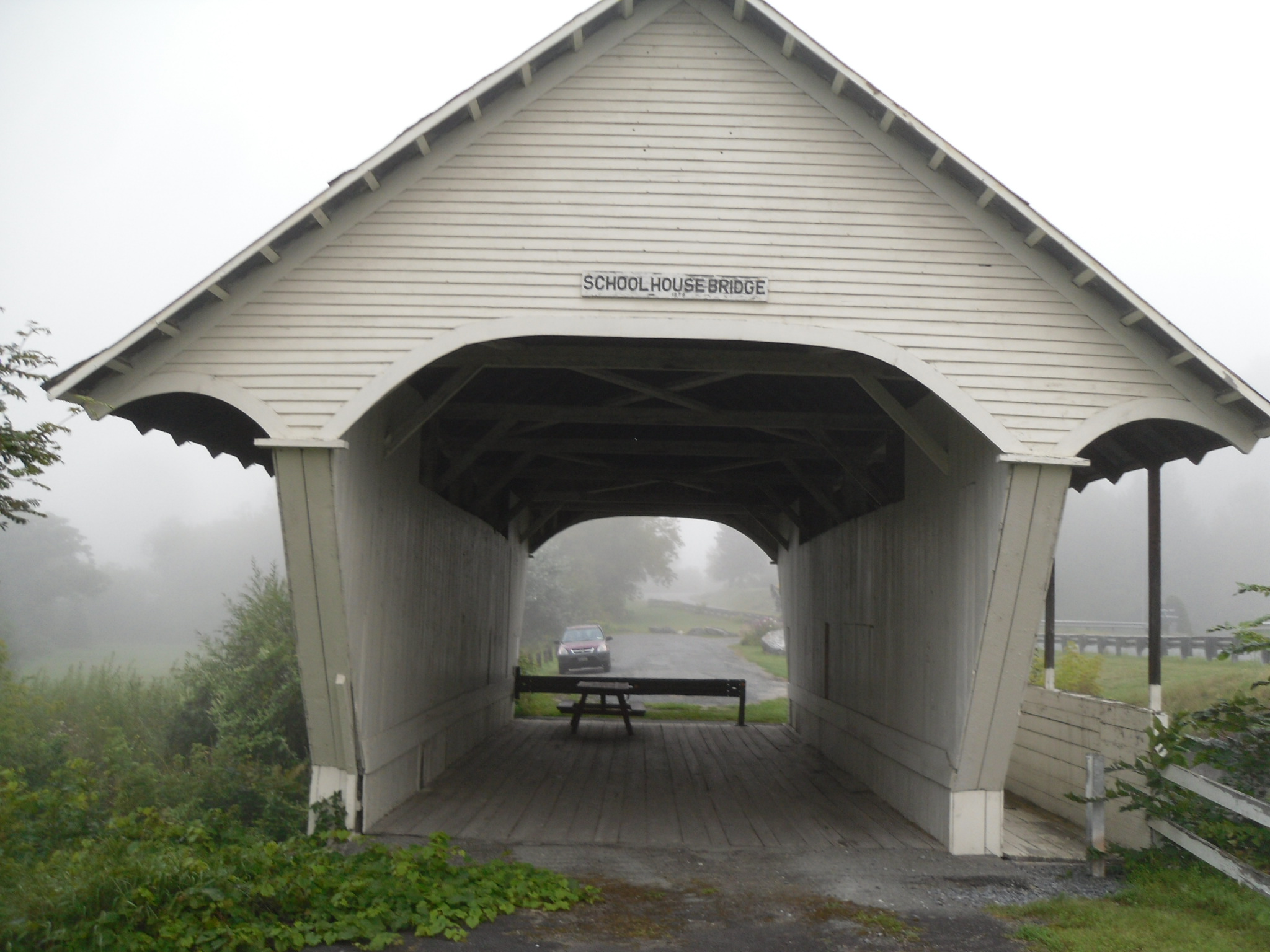

- Location within Vermont Location within the United States
- Location: Adjacent to S. Wheelock Rd. over Cold Hill Brook, Lyndon, Vermont
- Coordinates: 44°30′57″N 72°0′38″W
- Area: less than one acre
- Built: 1871
- NRHP reference No.: 71000055
- Added to NRHP: March 31, 1971

The Old Schoolhouse Bridge is a historic covered bridge spanning the South Wheelock Branch of the Passumpsic River in Lyndon, Vermont. It is located just south of South Wheelock Road, which it formerly carried. Built in 1871, it is one five similar bridges in Lyndon. It was listed on the National Register of Historic Places in 1971.

== Description and history ==
The Old Schoolhouse Bridge is located south of downtown Lyndon, and just west of the interchange of Interstate 91 (I-91) and U.S. Route 5 (US 5). South Wheelock Road travels to the west from US 5 just south that interchange, quickly crossing the South Wheelock Branch. The covered bridge is located just south of the modern bridge carrying that road. It is a single-span king post truss, 42 feet (13 m) in length. It is covered by a gabled metal roof, which extends beyond the trusses. The bridge originally had walkways on both sides, but the southern one has been removed. The trusses are clad in vertical board siding both on their outsides and insides, as is the half-wall on the outside of the walkway. Posts rise from that half-wall to the edge of the roof.

The bridge was built in 1871, and is believed to be the only surviving 19th-century covered bridge with covered walkways on both sides. It is one of five bridges in Lyndon, the only one to have its interior clad in siding. It was in active service until 1973, and is now open only to pedestrian traffic.

== See also ==
- List of covered bridges in Vermont
- National Register of Historic Places listings in Caledonia County, Vermont
- List of bridges on the National Register of Historic Places in Vermont
