= Dog River (Vermont) =

Coordinates: 44.17749879336884°N 72.6598714420815°W

Dog River is a tributary to the Winooski River near Montpelier, Vermont. It is an important trout stream due to its biodiversity, and some consider it the best trout stream in the state for angling.
