= Queen post =

Truss bridge structure

Queen Post
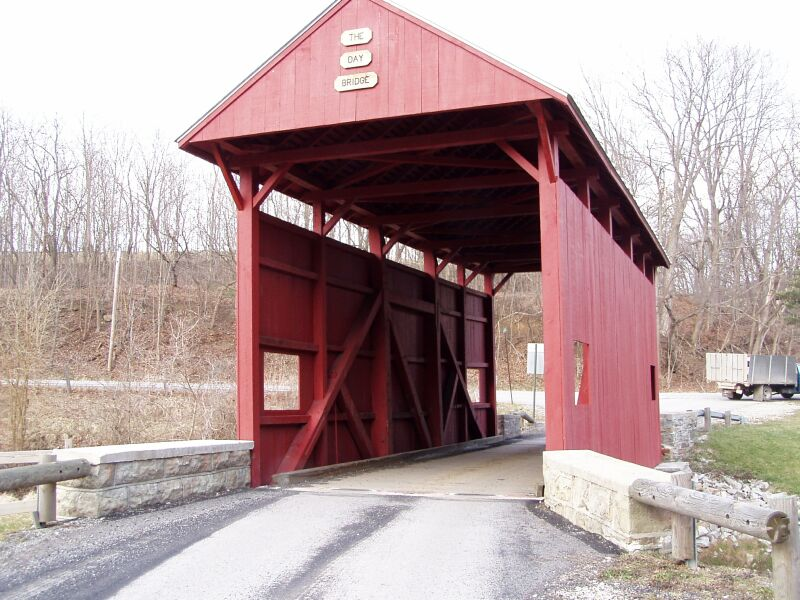
- Interior structure of a covered bridge that uses a queen-post structure
- Ancestor: Truss bridge
- Related: None
- Descendant: None
- Carries: Pedestrians, livestock, vehicles
- Span range: short to medium
- Material: wood planks
- Movable: No
- Design effort: medium
- Falsework required: Sometimes

A queen post is a tension member in a truss that can span longer openings than a king post truss. A king post uses one central supporting post, whereas the queen post truss uses two. Even though it is a tension member, rather than a compression member, they are commonly still called a post. A queen post is often confused with a queen strut, one of two compression members in roof framing which do not form a truss in the engineering sense.

The double punch truss appeared in Central Europe during the Renaissance.

== Architecture ==
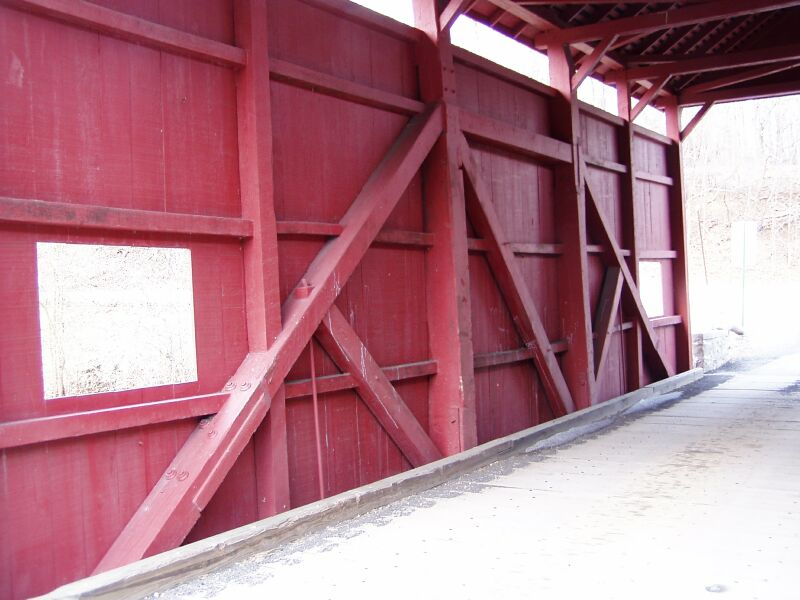
The queen posts are the second and third (from left) vertical posts visible in the photo, visibly thicker than the other posts.

A queen-post bridge has two uprights, placed about one-third of the way from each end of the truss. They are connected across the top by a beam and use a diagonal brace between the outer edges. The central square between the two verticals is either unbraced (on shorter spans), or has one or two diagonal braces for rigidity. A single diagonal reaches between opposite corners; two diagonal braces may either reach from the bottom of each upright post to the center of the upper beam, or form a corner-to-corner "X" inside the square.

== See also ==
- Timber roof trusses
- Timber framing
