= Paper Mill Village Bridge =

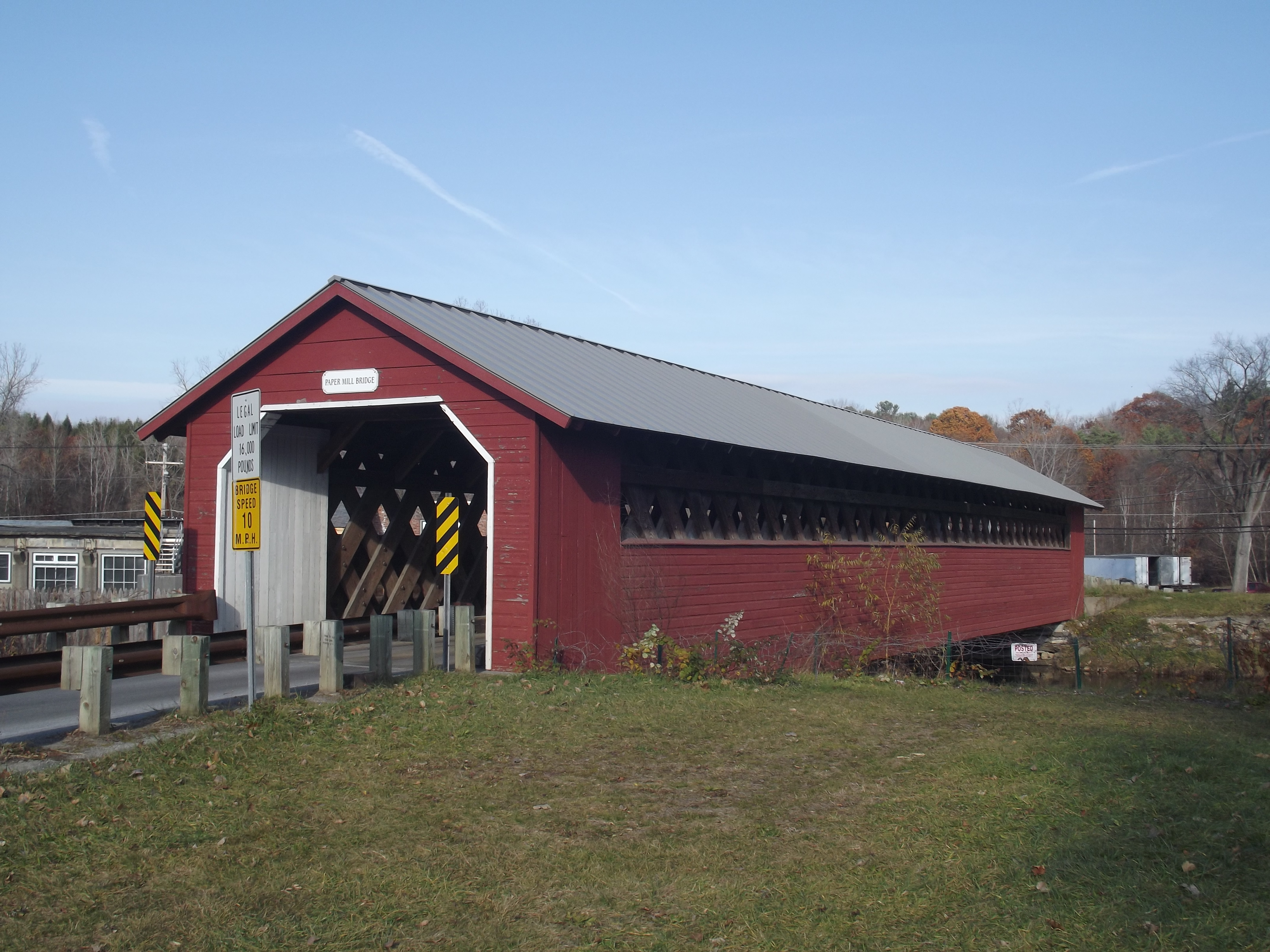
- Coordinates: 42°54′46″N 73°14′01″W
- Crosses: Walloomsac River
- Locale: Town of Bennington, Vermont
- ID number: VT-02-03

Characteristics
- Design: Covered, Town truss
- Total length: 125 ft 9 in (38.33 m)
- Width: 14 ft 6 in (4.42 m)
- No. of spans: 1

History
- Designer: Charles F. Sears
- Construction end: 1889; 137 years ago
- Bennington Falls Covered Bridge
- U.S. National Register of Historic Places
- Location within Vermont Location within the United States
- Nearest city: Bennington, Vermont
- Coordinates: 42°54′46″N 73°14′01″W
- Area: 1 acre (0.4 ha)
- Built: 1889; 137 years ago
- Architect: Sears, Charles F.
- Architectural style: Town lattice truss
- NRHP reference No.: 73000185
- Added to NRHP: August 28, 1973

Location
- Interactive map of Paper Mill Village Bridge

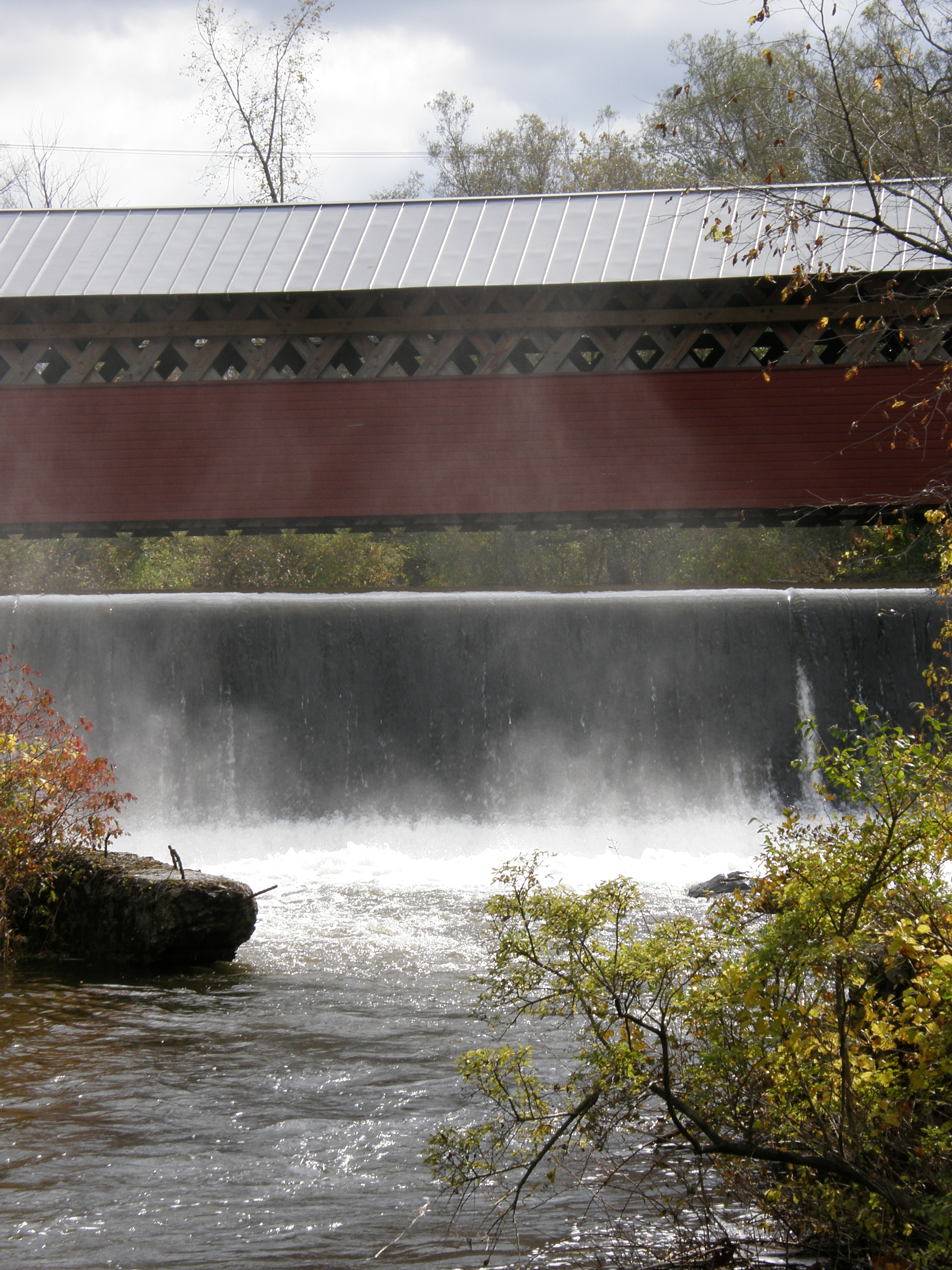
Side view of Paper Mill Covered Bridge over Wallomsac River dam

The Paper Mill Village Bridge, also called the Paper Mill Bridge or Bennington Falls Covered Bridge, is a wooden covered bridge that carries Murphy Road across the Walloomsac River northwest of Bennington, Vermont. Built in 1889, it was listed on the National Register of Historic Places in 1973.

== Description and history ==
The Paper Mill Village Bridge is located adjacent to a former paper mill building, located on the south side of State Route 67A, just south of the campus of Bennington College, northwest of downtown Bennington. It is a single-span Town lattice truss structure, 125 feet (38 m) long and 18.5 feet (5.6 m) wide, with a roadway width of 15 feet (4.6 m) (one lane). It rests on stone abutments that have been partially faced in concrete. The sides are clad in vertical board siding, while the portal ends are finished in horizontal flushboard siding. The side walls only rise part of the way to the roof, which shelters the upper portions of the trusses. A number of the truss members have been doubled to strengthen them, and there are also additional floor beams.

The Paper Mill Bridge was built in 1889 by Charles F. Sears, whose family was prominent in the local bridge-building business. The bridge, which is the longest covered bridge in Bennington County, is similar in design to the nearby Silk Covered Bridge, whose design is sometimes attributed to Sears' father Benjamin. It was rebuilt in 2000.

== See also ==
- List of covered bridges in Vermont
- National Register of Historic Places listings in Bennington County, Vermont
- List of bridges on the National Register of Historic Places in Vermont
