= Silk Covered Bridge =

- U.S. National Register of Historic Places
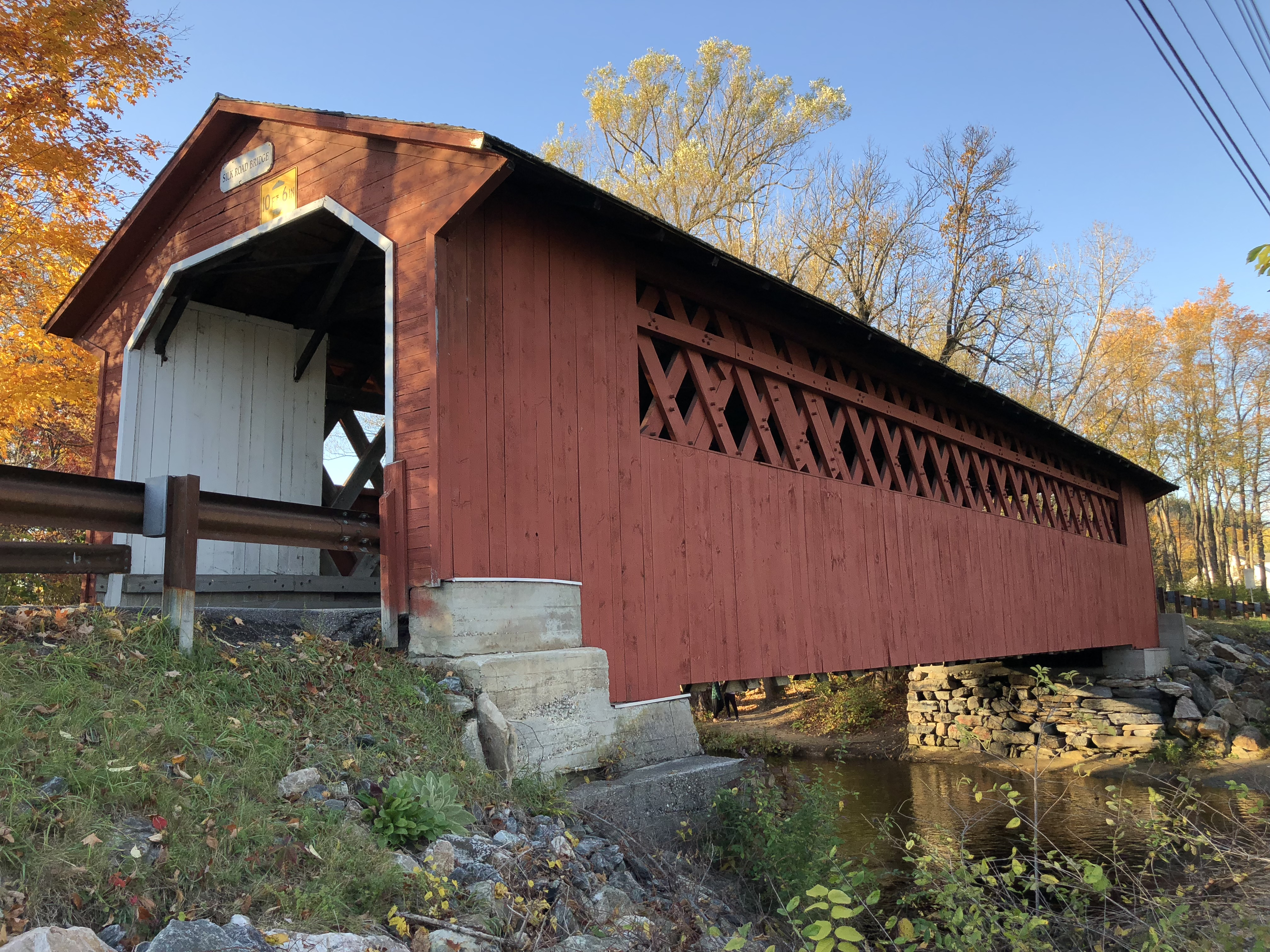
- Bridge in October, 2020

- Location within Vermont Location within the United States
- Nearest city: Bennington, Vermont
- Coordinates: 42°54′34″N 73°13′33″W
- Built: 1840
- NRHP reference No.: 73000190
- Added to NRHP: August 28, 1973

The Silk Covered Bridge is a covered bridge, carrying Silk Road across the Walloomsac River between downtown Bennington, Vermont and the village of North Bennington, United States. A Town lattice truss bridge, it was built in 1840, and is one of three covered bridges across the river in fairly close proximity. It was added to the National Register of Historic Places in 1973.

== Description ==
The Silk Covered Bridge is located roughly midway between downtown Bennington and North Bennington, on Silk Road, which connects Vermont Route 67A and Vermont Route 279. The bridge has a relatively rural setting. It is oriented north–south across the west-flowing Walloomsac River. Its northern abutment is original stone slab, which has been faced in concrete, while the southern abutment is a reconstructed concrete structure. The bridge is a Town lattice truss, 88 feet (27 m) long, with a single-lane roadway 15 feet (4.6 m) wide. The sides of the bridge are clad in vertical boards, as are the insides of the portals, while the outside portal ends are finished in flush horizontal boards. In the center part of the bridge, the boards do not rise the full height of the truss.

== History ==
The bridge was probably built in 1840 by Benjamin Sears, who was from a family of well-known bridge builders in the region. The family is also credited with construction of the Paper Mill Village Bridge (1889), downriver a short way from this bridge; the Burt Henry Covered Bridge is also nearby, the three bridges all on a 2-mile (3.2 km) stretch of the river.

On August 28, 2011, the Silk bridge was damaged by flood waters as a result of Hurricane Irene. The bridge was repaired and reopened.

== See also ==
- List of covered bridges in Vermont
- National Register of Historic Places listings in Bennington County, Vermont
- List of bridges on the National Register of Historic Places in Vermont
