= Free Library =

Free Library may refer to:

- Akin Free Library, a historic eclectic late Victorian stone building
- Ames Free Library, a library in Massachusetts, United States
- Baen Free Library, a digital library
- Bennington Free Library, a public library in Bennington, Bennington County, Vermont, United States
- Bernard Free Library, the first free public library in Myanmar
- Carnegie Free Library of Beaver Falls, the first public library built in Beaver County, Pennsylvania, United States
- Crompton Free Library, a library in Rhode Island
- Enoch Pratt Free Library, one of the oldest free public libraries in the United States
- Free Library of Philadelphia, the public library system serving Philadelphia, Pennsylvania
- Haskell Free Library and Opera House, a neoclassical building
- Huntington Free Library and Reading Room, a privately endowed library in the Bronx, United States, United States
- Indiana Free Library, a public library in Pennsylvania, United States
- Kent Free Library, a public library located in Kent, Ohio, United States
- Little Free Library, a community movement in the United States and worldwide that offers free books housed in small containers to members of the local community
- New City Free Library, a library in New City, New York, United States
- Newton Free Library, the public library of Newton, Massachusetts, United States
- Parkway Central Library, the main library of the Free Library of Philadelphia, United States
- T.B. Scott Free Library, a public library in the city of Merrill, Wisconsin, United States
- TheFreeLibrary.com, free reference website that offers full-text versions of classic literary works.
- Williams Free Library, the first public library in the United States of America to have open stacks
