= Mood's Covered Bridge =

- Formerly listed on the U.S. National Register of Historic Places
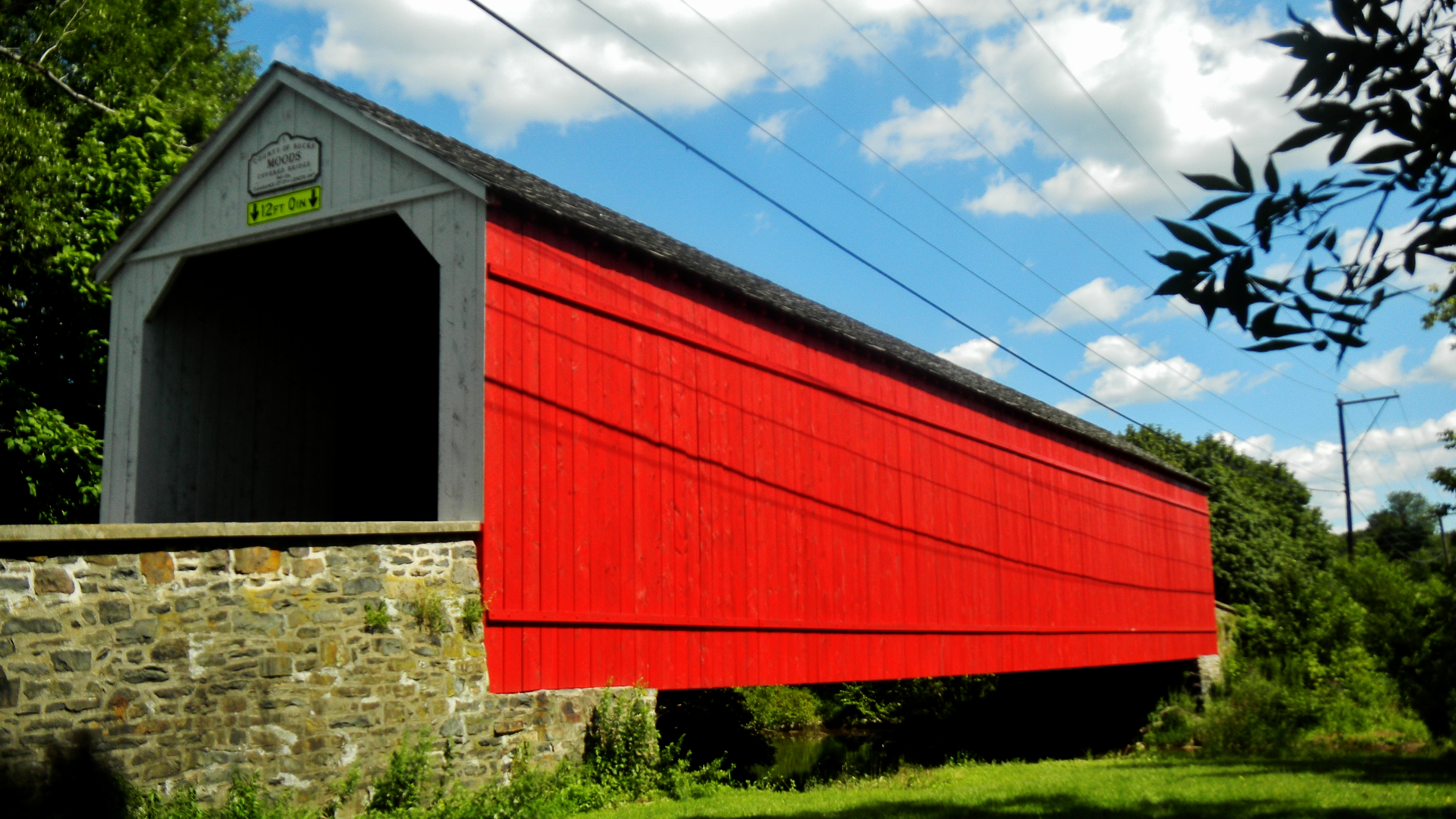
- Moods Covered Bridge, August 2011

- Location within Pennsylvania Location within the United States
- Location: E of Perkasie on LR 09118, East Rockhill Township, Pennsylvania
- Coordinates: 40.3812°N 75.27164°W
- Area: 0.1 acres (0.040 ha)
- Built: 1874
- Architectural style: Town truss
- MPS: Covered Bridges of the Delaware River Watershed TR
- NRHP reference No.: 80003440

Significant dates
- Added to NRHP: December 1, 1980
- Removed from NRHP: August 19, 2004

Mood's Covered Bridge was an historic covered bridge that was located in East Rockhill Township, Bucks County, Pennsylvania, United States. It crossed the East Branch Perkiomen Creek.

== History and architectural features ==
Built in 1874 and designed in the town truss style, the bridge was 120 feet long and 15 feet wide.

It was added to the National Register of Historic Places on December 1, 1980. It was destroyed by arson on June 22, 2004, and subsequently removed from the National Register of Historic Places. The wooden cover was subsequently rebuilt and the bridge reopened on February 15, 2008.
