= Root Road Covered Bridge =

Bridge in Ashtabula County, Ohio, United States

Root Road Bridge
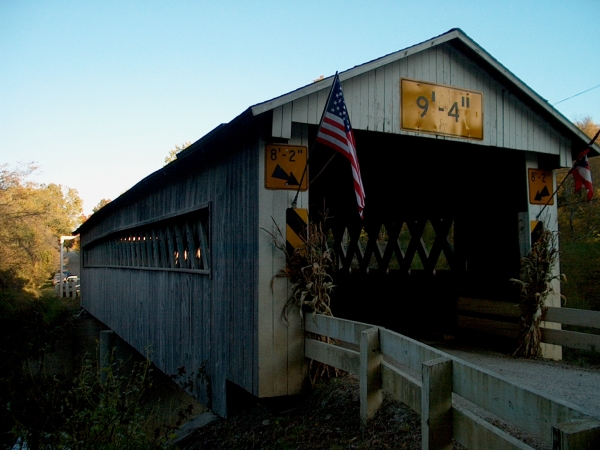
- Coordinates: 41°50′00″N 80°37′12″W
- Locale: Ashtabula County, Ohio, United States

Characteristics
- Design: single span, Town truss
- Total length: 112 feet (34.1 m)

History
- Construction start: 1868

Root Road Bridge is a covered bridge spanning the west branch of the Ashtabula River in Monroe Township, Ashtabula County, Ohio, United States. The bridge, one of currently 16 drivable bridges in the county, is a single span Town truss design. During its renovation in 1982-83, the bridge was raised 18 inches (460 mm), and a new center pier was added. The bridge’s WGCB number is 35-04-09, and it is located approximately 6.3 mi (10.1 km) southeast of North Kingsville.

== History ==
- 1868 – Bridge constructed.
- 1982–83 – Bridge renovated.

A former toll road just east of there ran north and south through the county. Dwight and Gertrude (Hallam) Root, had a son Herbert Root. Herbert married Frances Whitlam, daughter of John H. Whitlam, one if not the first Superintendent of Roads in Ashtabula County, for twenty five years. He possibly was involved in the construction of the earlier bridges.

== Dimensions ==
- Span: 82 feet 4 inches (25.10 m)
- Length: 112 feet (34 m)
- Width: 11.3 feet (3.4 m)
- Height: 10 feet 2 inches (3.10 m)
- Overhead clearance: 9 feet 4 inches (2.84 m)

== Gallery ==
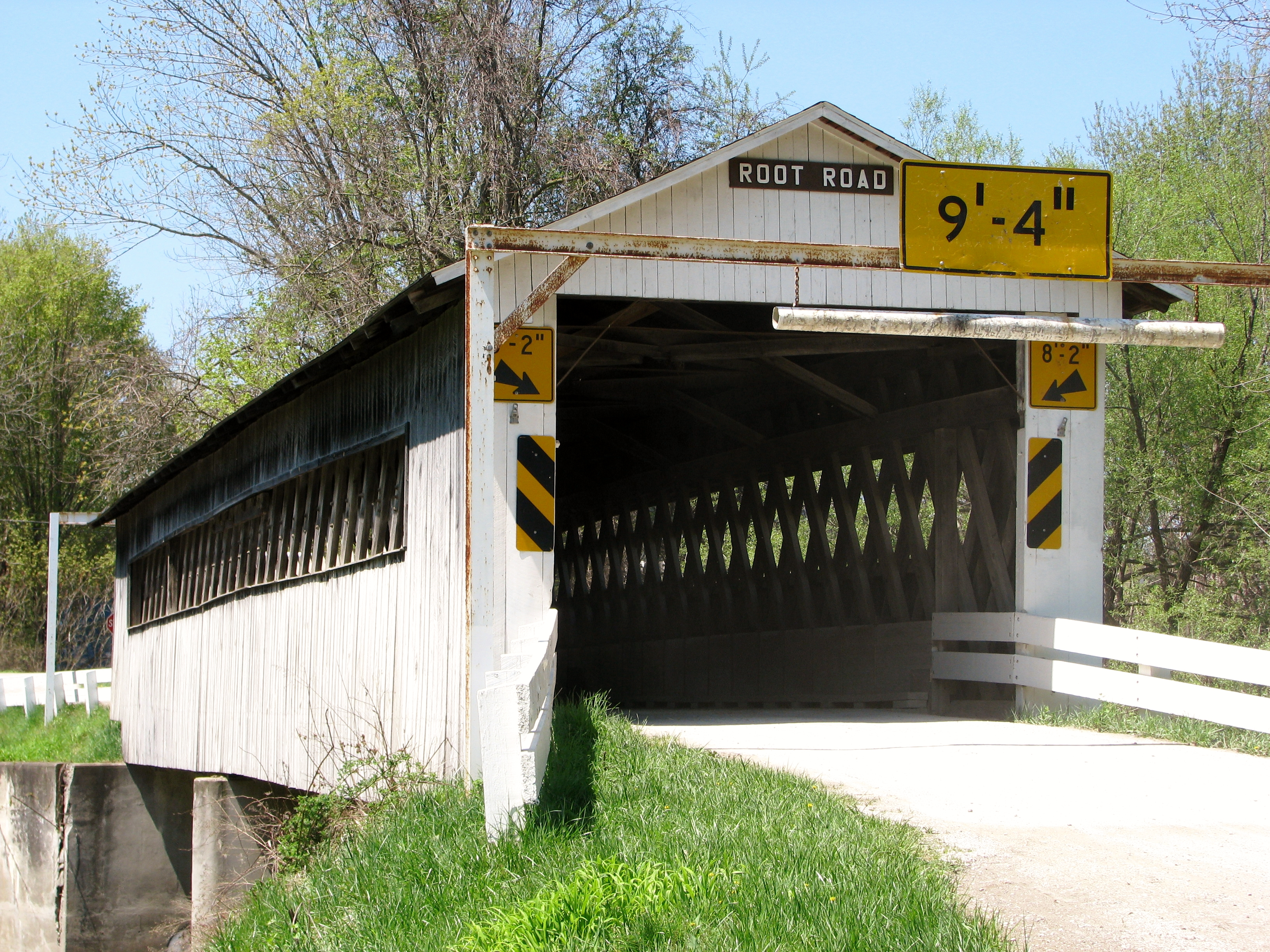

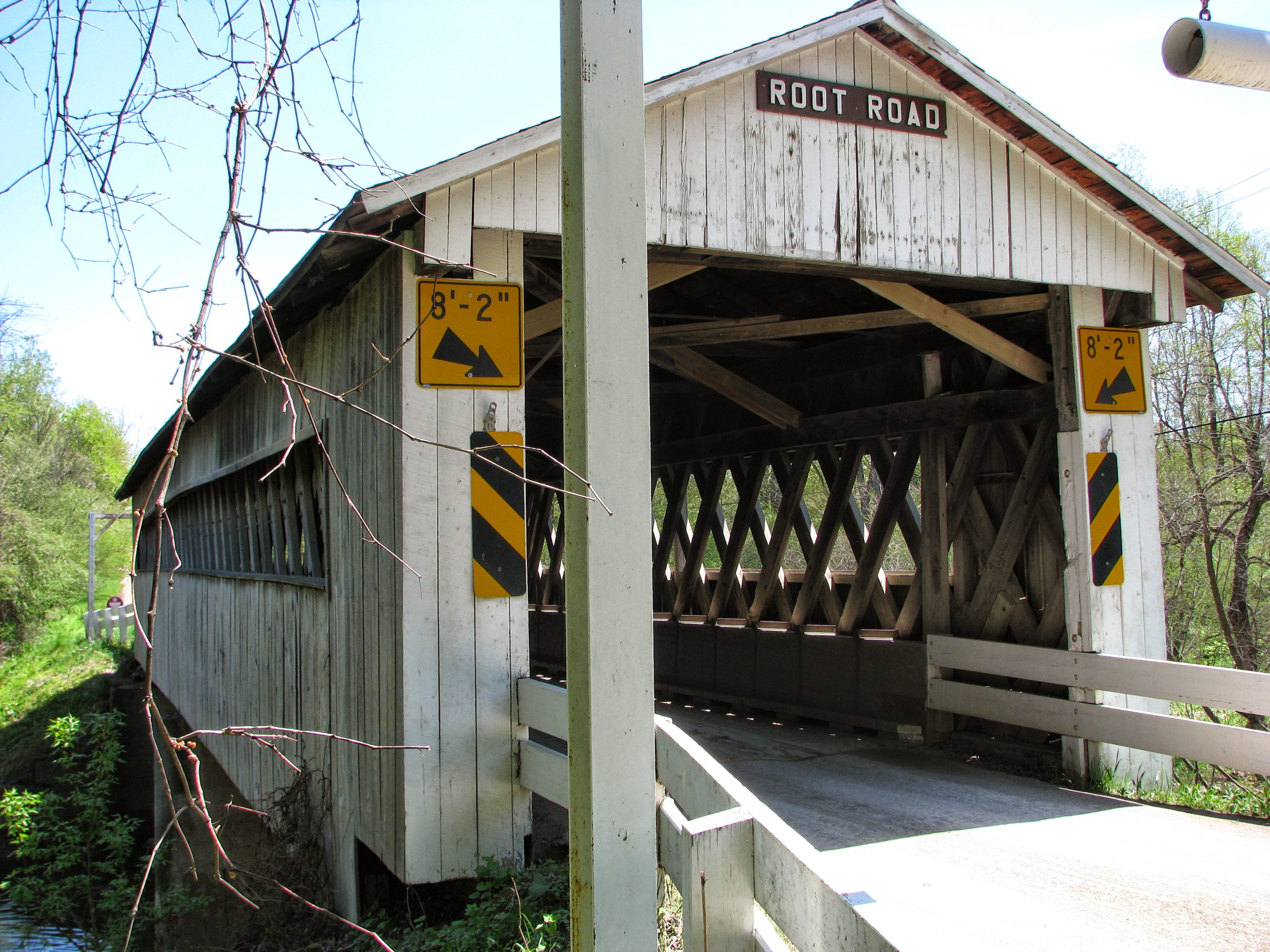

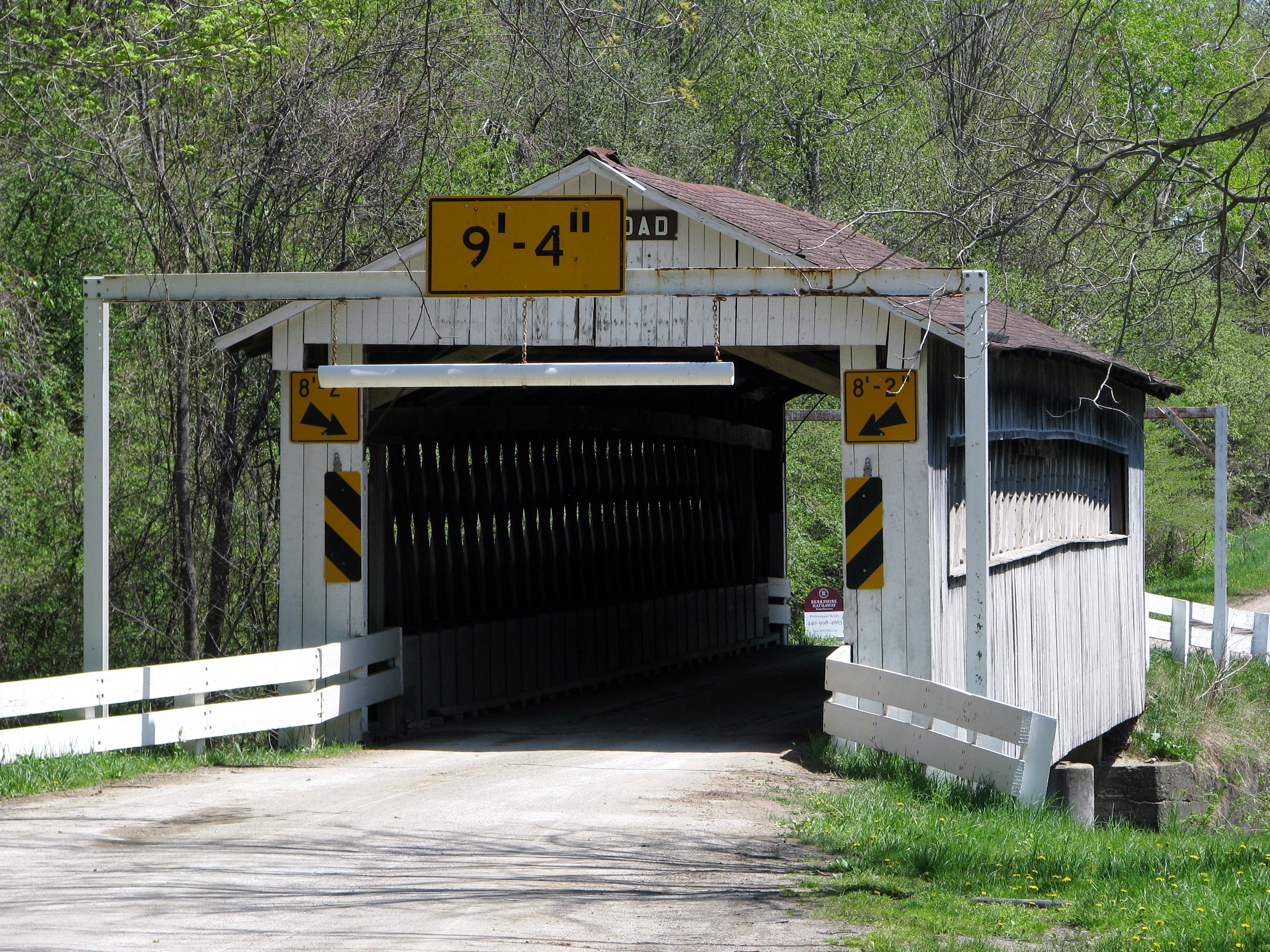

== See also ==
- List of Ashtabula County covered bridges
