= Walloomsac River =

River in the U.S. states of Vermont and New York

Coordinates: 42.935124°N 73.265762°W

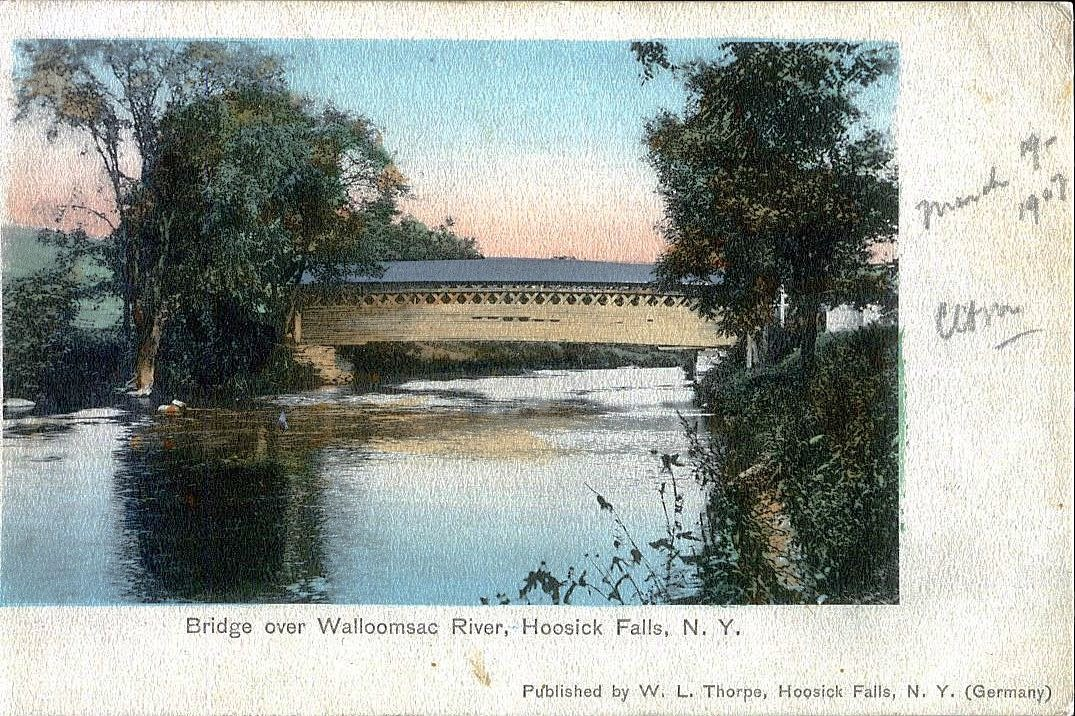
Bridge over the Walloomsac River, Hoosick Falls, from a 1907 postcard

The Walloomsac River (/ˈwɑːluːmsæk, ˈwælʊmsɪk/) from the Native American name, Wal-loom-sac is a 16.8-mile-long (27.0 km) tributary of the Hoosic River in the northeastern United States. It rises in southwestern Vermont, in the Green Mountains east of the town of Bennington in Woodford Hollow at the confluence of Bolles Brook and City Stream where it is labeled Walloomsac Brook on maps but is locally known as "The Roaring Branch". The river then flows west toward Bennington and passes the downtown area to the north. For many years this section was intermittent due to the water having been diverted to power mills in town (ca. 1810). This divergence gave the name Walloomsac to a portion of the river flowing through town on the present course of South Stream. The combined Walloomsac / South Stream joins the Roaring Branch northwest of town. From here the river flows westward as the Walloomsac River and joins the Hoosic River below Hoosick Falls, New York.

== Bridges ==
The river is crossed by the following roads / railroads via bridges.

=== Vermont ===
Walloomsac Brook

- VT 9 - "Woodford Bridge", west of Long Trail/Appalachian Trail trailhead, washed away in flood waters related to Hurricane Irene in August 2011, and another bridge east of downtown Bennington

The Roaring Branch

- VT 279 just north of its eastern terminus and SPUI interchange at Route 9 (2 one-way bridges)
- North Branch Street - the bridge there is known locally as the Brooklyn Bridge
- Park Street
- US 7
- Railroad bridge between US Route 7 and Benmont Avenue

Walloomsac River

- Benmont Avenue
- Hunt Street foot bridge (washed away in flood waters related to Hurricane Irene in August 2011)
- VT 279 via the western leg of the "Bennington Bypass"
- Silk Road via the Silk Covered Bridge
- Murphy Road via two bridges at Paper Mill Village including the Paper Mill Village Covered Bridge
- River Road via the Burt Henry Covered Bridge

=== New York ===
- Cottrell Road in two places
- Caretakers Road
- Factory Hill Road
- NY 22
- Railroad bridges in three places

== Tributaries ==
Traveling upstream from the confluence with the Hoosic River, the following tributaries feed the Walloomsac:

- Little White Creek
- Paran Creek
- Walloomsac River (original path through downtown Bennington, name ends at confluence of Roaring Brook and South Stream):
  - Roaring Brook
  - Barney Brook
  - South Stream
    - Jewett Brook
    - Roaring Branch (of South Stream)
- Roaring Branch of the Walloomsac River (so named on maps from US 7 to VT 9, locally this name continues to Bolles Brook)
  - Furnace Brook
    - Stratton Brook
    - Basin Brook
  - Walloomsac Brook (so named on maps from VT 9 to confluence of Bolles Brook and City Stream)
    - Bolles Brook
      - Bickford Hollow Brook
      - Hell Hollow Brook
    - City Stream
      - Stamford Stream

== See also ==
- List of rivers of New York
- List of rivers of Vermont
- Hoosic River
