= Windsor Mills Covered Bridge =

- U.S. National Register of Historic Places
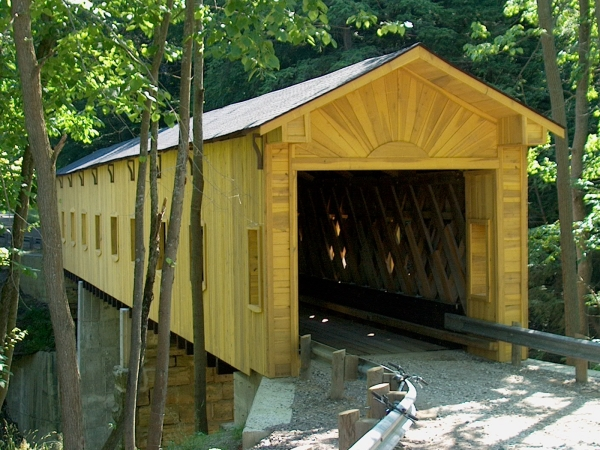

- Location within Ohio
- Nearest city: Windsor, Ohio
- Coordinates: 41°31′59″N 80°57′50″W
- Area: less than one acre
- Built: 1867
- Architectural style: Town lattice truss
- NRHP reference No.: 73001386
- Added to NRHP: April 11, 1973

Windsor Mills Bridge
- Coordinates: 41°31′59″N 80°57′50″W
- Locale: Ashtabula County, Ohio, United States

Characteristics
- Design: single span, Town truss
- Total length: 120 feet (36.6 m)

History
- Construction start: 1867

Location
- Interactive map of Windsor Mills Bridge

Windsor Mills Bridge, also known as Wiswell Road Bridge or Warner Hollow Road Bridge, is a covered bridge that carries Covered Bridge Lane, formerly Wiswell Road, across Phelps Creek in Windsor Township, Ashtabula County, Ohio, United States. The bridge, one of currently 17 drivable bridges in the county, is a single-span Town truss design. The bridge was built in 1867 using white pine. It sits atop cut stone abutments, one made of sandstone quarried nearby, and the other made of creek stone. The bridge was bypassed in the 1960s and closed to traffic, and Wiswell Road was rerouted west of the creek. In the 1980s, the bridge was completely closed due to safety reasons. It underwent extensive renovation from 2002 to 2004, and was then reopened to all traffic, except for trucks and buses. The bridge is listed in the National Register of Historic Places. The bridge's WGCB number is 35-04-25, and it is located approximately 5.0 mi (8.0 km) west of Orwell.

== History ==
- 1867 – Bridge constructed.
- 2002-04 – Bridge renovated.
- 2004 – Bridge rededicated.

== Dimensions ==
- Length: 120 feet (36.6 m)

== Gallery ==
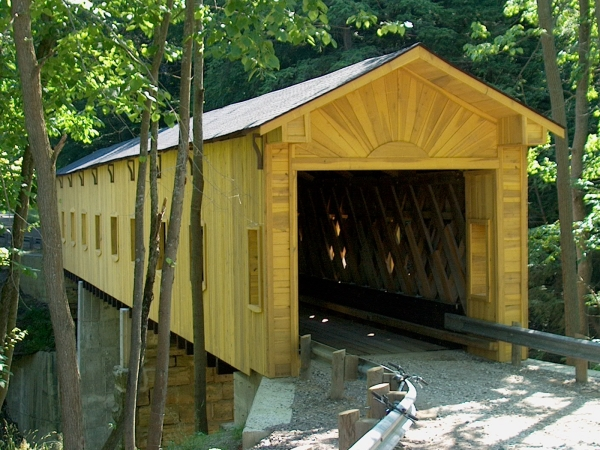
North approach

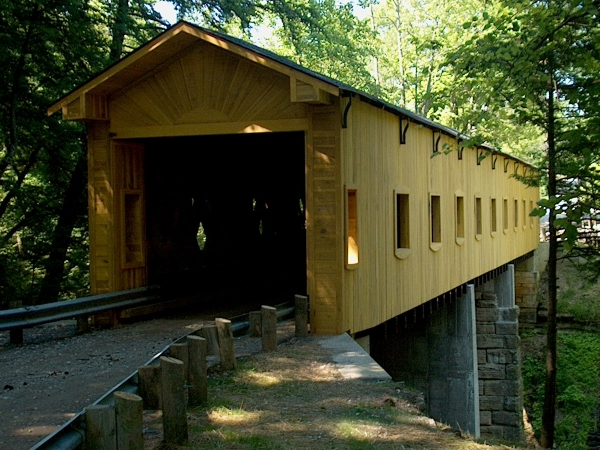
South approach

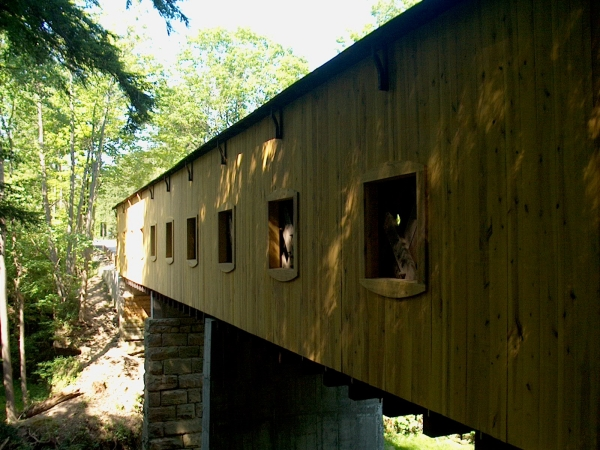
View from the southwest

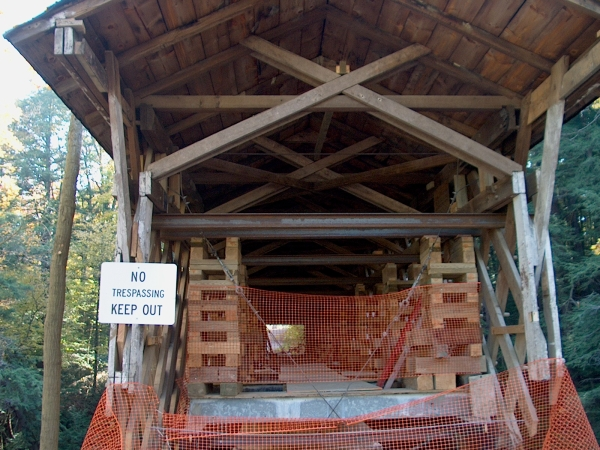
During rehabilitation in 2003

== See also ==
- List of Ashtabula County covered bridges
