= Southwestern Vermont Medical Center =

Coordinates: 42.8743°N 73.2074°W

Geography
- Location: Bennington, Vermont, United States

Organization
- Type: General

Services
- Emergency department: Yes
- Beds: 99

History
- Founded: 1918

Links
- Website: http://www.svhealthcare.org
- Lists: Hospitals in Vermont

Southwestern Vermont Medical Center (SVMC) is a general medical surgical hospital located in Bennington, Vermont. It is licensed for 99-beds. Founded in the early 20th century by donations from Henry W. Putnam and his son, SVMC is the only hospital in Bennington County, Vermont. It also serves portions of western Windham County, Vermont, eastern Rensselaer County, New York, and eastern Washington County, New York.

== History ==
SVMC opened in 1918 as Putnam Memorial Hospital. The hospital was built primarily with money donated by Henry W. Putnam and his son, Henry W. Putnam Jr.

Henry W. Putnam Sr., was a wealthy businessman who started out selling bottled water during the California Gold Rush. His businesses included ventures as varied as canning jars and other household goods, hardware, real estate, and railroad investments. He settled in Bennington to be near his wife's family, where he owned a private company that provided a water supply to homes. In 1912, Putnam Sr., gave his water company to Bennington. Among other provisions, he stipulated that the proceeds be used "to establish, equip, and maintain a public hospital to be located in the village of Bennington... into which hospital... persons requiring treatment... may be admitted and receive treatment at reasonable charge, [sic] and the destitute free of charge."

However, progress on building the hospital moved slowly. When Putnam died in 1915, the hospital corporators had roughly $12,000 in the bank and had chosen a construction site, but did not have the $100,000 estimated for the project. In the spring of 1916, Henry Putnam Jr., donated $90,000 to spark the hospital construction, and the corporators broke ground the following August. The 30-bed hospital opened in June 1918.

Henry Putnam Jr., continued to support the hospital financially until his death in 1938. He regularly financed expansions and new equipment and "personally made up annual hospital deficits ranging from $30,000 to $50,000." In his will, the younger Putnam left $3 million to his eponymous institution, which formed the nucleus of its charitable endowment.

In 1984, the hospital changed its name to Southwestern Vermont Medical Center, for "bureaucratic reasons having to do with payment for Medicaid and Medicare patients and the protection of the endowment fund."

== Information and services ==
As a community hospital, SVMC offers a variety of hospital services including:

- emergency room
- general and orthopedic surgery
- maternity and childbirth services
- imaging (X-ray, MRI, CT scan, ultrasound, and PET/CT, etc.)
- testing for sleep problems
- rehabilitation
- outpatient kidney dialysis
- cancer care

=== Medical staff ===
SVMC has more than 130 physicians on its medical staff. In addition to primary care, the medical staff has a variety of specialists including cardiology, pulmonology, gastroenterology, oncology, and infectious disease. Recently, recruiting new physicians to medical staff has become more challenging. In 2006, a state-appointed committee recognized that physician pay and other factors had led to in a shortage of primary care and specialists in hospitals throughout Vermont. The shortage was particularly acute in 2007 when the hospital had 25 vacant positions on the staff. The hospital responded to physician shortage by increasing its efforts to recruit physicians using innovative techniques such as a special website devoted to recruiting physicians. The efforts paid off. Within a few months of changing their recruiting strategy, the hospital had filled 10 of the 25 open positions.

=== Patient safety ===
In 2008, the hospital completed the transition to fully electronic medication administration. The new system incorporates bar codes on patient arm bands, bar coded medications packed in single doses, and scanning by the nurse at the bedside. The system improves patient safety by alerting nurses to medication allergies, incorrect doses, or a mismatch between the medication order and the patient about to receive the medication. The Rutland Herald reported that only 15 percent of hospitals nationwide have a fully electronic system for documenting medication administration.

SVMC also has adopted a "culture of openness" regarding medical mistakes. Administration and medical staff leaders have worked with Dale Micalizzi an advocate for patients who lost her 11-year-old son to a medical mistake. That "openness" is linked to a trend in healthcare to change the way hospitals and doctors deal with errors. This approach advocates that hospitals and doctors cooperate with each other and with families, share information, apologize, and work to prevent errors from occurring again.

In 2004, SVMC became the first Vermont hospital to set up a Patient Safety Department. The hospital established the department to centralize activities related to patient safety and to "be proactive and look at potential accidents and prevent harm from ever happening." Likewise, later that year, SVMC and fourteen other hospitals in Vermont announced that they would join the IMPACT, a program from the Institute for Healthcare Improvement that allows hospitals to work on quality improvement project and share strategies for success.

=== Facility ===
The hospital remains in the same location chosen by the corporators. The original building still stands and is still in use, although numerous additions have changed its appearance in the intervening years. In 2008, SVMC began the process of gaining state and local approval to update its infrastructure with a new central plant for heating, cooling, and emergency power. It also applied for permission to construct additional patient rooms and renovate and expand areas, such as the Emergency Department and the Laboratory, that do not meet current standards for floor space.

=== Awards and accreditations ===
- A Magnet Hospital for Nursing Excellence, as designated by the American Nurses Credentialing Center
- Mentor hospital with the Institute for Health Care Improvement
- Accredited by the Joint Commission
- Laboratory is accredited by the College of American Pathologists

=== Related organizations ===
Southwestern Vermont Medical Center is part of Southwestern Vermont Health Care. Southwestern Vermont Health Care includes:

- The Centers for Living & Rehabilitation, a 150-bed nursing home and rehabilitation facility.
- Visiting Nurse Association & Hospice, a home health agency and Medicare-certified hospice.
- Southwestern Vermont Regional Cancer Center, SVMC's cancer program approved by the American College of Surgeons
- SVMC Northshire Campus, a primary care medical practice in Manchester, Vt.
- SVMC Deerfield Valley Campus, a primary care medical practice in Wilmington, Vt.
