= Burt Henry Covered Bridge =

- Henry Covered Bridge
- U.S. National Register of Historic Places
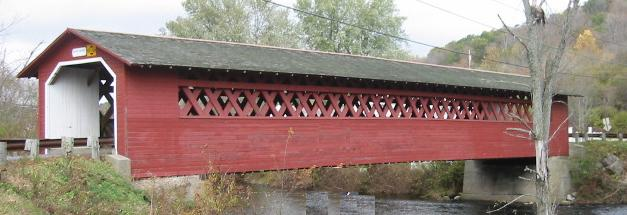

- Location within Vermont Location within the United States
- Nearest city: Bennington, Vermont
- Coordinates: 42.912647°N 73.255516°W
- Area: 1 acre (0.40 ha)
- Built: 1835
- Architectural style: Town lattice truss
- NRHP reference No.: 73000187
- Added to NRHP: August 28, 1973

The Burt Henry Covered Bridge, also known as the Henry Covered Bridge or just the Henry Bridge, is a covered bridge that spans the Walloomsac River near Bennington, Vermont. A Town lattice truss bridge, it carries River Road, just south of the village of North Bennington. Originally built about 1840, it was listed on the National Register of Historic Places in 1973 as Bennington County's oldest covered bridge. It was rebuilt in 1989 by the Vermont Agency of Transportation.

== Description and history ==
The Henry Covered Bridge is located on northwestern Bennington, southwest of the village of North Bennington and the campus of Bennington College. It carries River Road across the westward-flowing Walloomsac River, about 0.5 miles (0.80 km) west of its junction with Vermont Route 67A. The historic Henry House stands just south of the bridge. The bridge is a single-span Town lattice truss structure, with a total length of 121 feet (37 m), and a width of 18.5 feet (5.6 m) and a roadway width of 15 feet (4.6 m), sufficient for one modern travel lane. The sides are finished in novelty siding, while the ends are finished horizontal flushboarding, with vertical boarding sheltering the trusses just inside the portal. The siding on the sides does not always extend to the gabled roof, providing light into the structure.

The bridge's original construction date was estimated to be sometime in the 1830s. At one time, an attempt to strengthen the bridge was made by doubling the trusses, so that heavily laden trucks could pass over the bridge; this was deemed ineffective, and the change was eventually reversed. The bridge was completely rebuilt in 1989.

== See also ==
- List of Vermont covered bridges
- National Register of Historic Places listings in Bennington County, Vermont
- List of bridges on the National Register of Historic Places in Vermont
