= Bennington Free Library =

- 42.87785634680036°N 73.19321634814088°W
- Location: Bennington, Vermont, US
- Type: Public library
- Established: 1865

Other information
- Website: https://benningtonfreelibrary.org/

Bennington Free Library is a public library located at 101 Silver Street in Bennington, Vermont.

== History ==
The library was established in 1865, by Trenor W. Park and Seth B. Hunt, on the corner of Main and Silver Streets. Originally, and costing in total 10,000 USD, a room was "fitted up as a library" on the second floor of the as yet unfinished building. The Town of Bennington then, in 1897, voted to appropriate funds towards making library materials available free of charge.

In 1936 a new library was constructed adjacent to the original, and donated in memory of Park by his son. The architect for the 1936 library was Herbert Turner. In the late 1980s, the library went through significant renovations, including the construction of a bridge between the nineteenth and twentieth century buildings.
