= Bennington, Vermont =

- Town
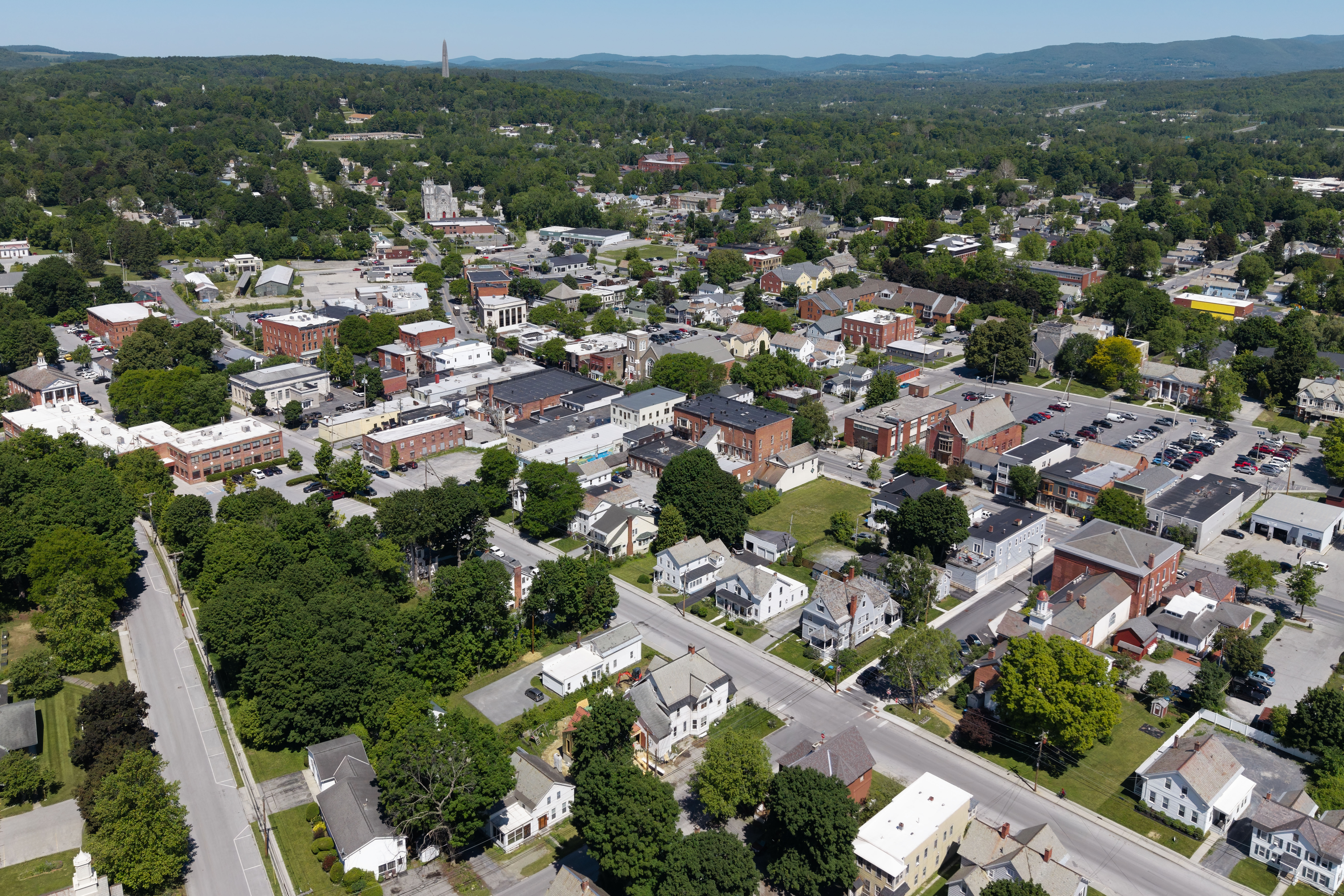
- Downtown (2026)

- Seal
- Motto: It's Where Vermont Begins!
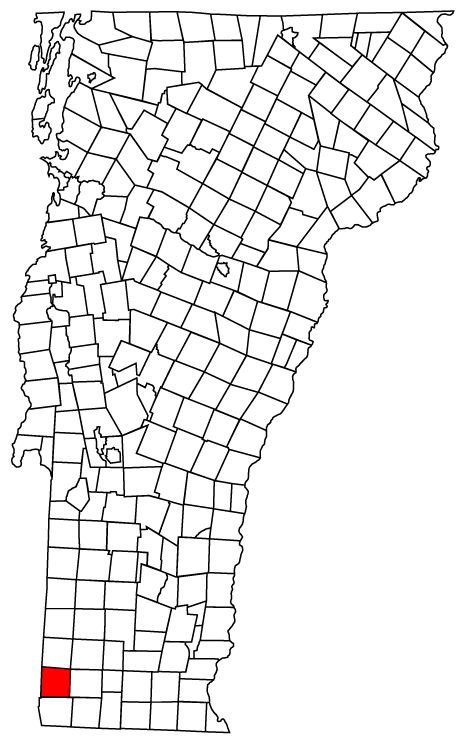
- Location in Vermont
- Coordinates: 42°52′48″N 73°14′32″W
- Country: United States
- State: Vermont
- County: Bennington
- Chartered: January 3, 1749
- Communities: Bennington; North Bennington; Old Bennington; Paper Mill Village

Government
  - Town Manager: Stuart A. Hurd
  - Assistant Town Manager: Dan Monks

Area
  - Total: 42.5 sq mi (110.1 km^{2})
  - Land: 42.2 sq mi (109.4 km^{2})
  - Water: 0.27 sq mi (0.7 km^{2})
- Elevation: 814 ft (248 m)

Population (2020)
  - Total: 15,333
  - Density: 363.0/sq mi (140.2/km^{2})
  - Households: 6,246
  - Families: 3,716
- Time zone: UTC−5 (EST)
  - Summer (DST): UTC−4 (EDT)
- ZIP Codes: 05201 (Bennington); 05257 (North Bennington)
- Area code: 802
- FIPS code: 50-04825
- GNIS feature ID: 1462039
- Website: benningtonvt.org

Bennington is a town in Bennington County, Vermont, United States. It is one of two shire towns (county seats) of the county, the other being Manchester. As of the 2020 US Census, the population was 15,333. Bennington is the most populous town in southern Vermont, the second-largest town in Vermont (after Colchester) and the fifth-largest municipality in the state.

The town is home to the Bennington Battle Monument, which is the tallest human-made structure in the state of Vermont. The town has a long history of manufacturing, primarily within wood processing. The town is also recognized nationally for its pottery, iron, and textiles.

== History ==
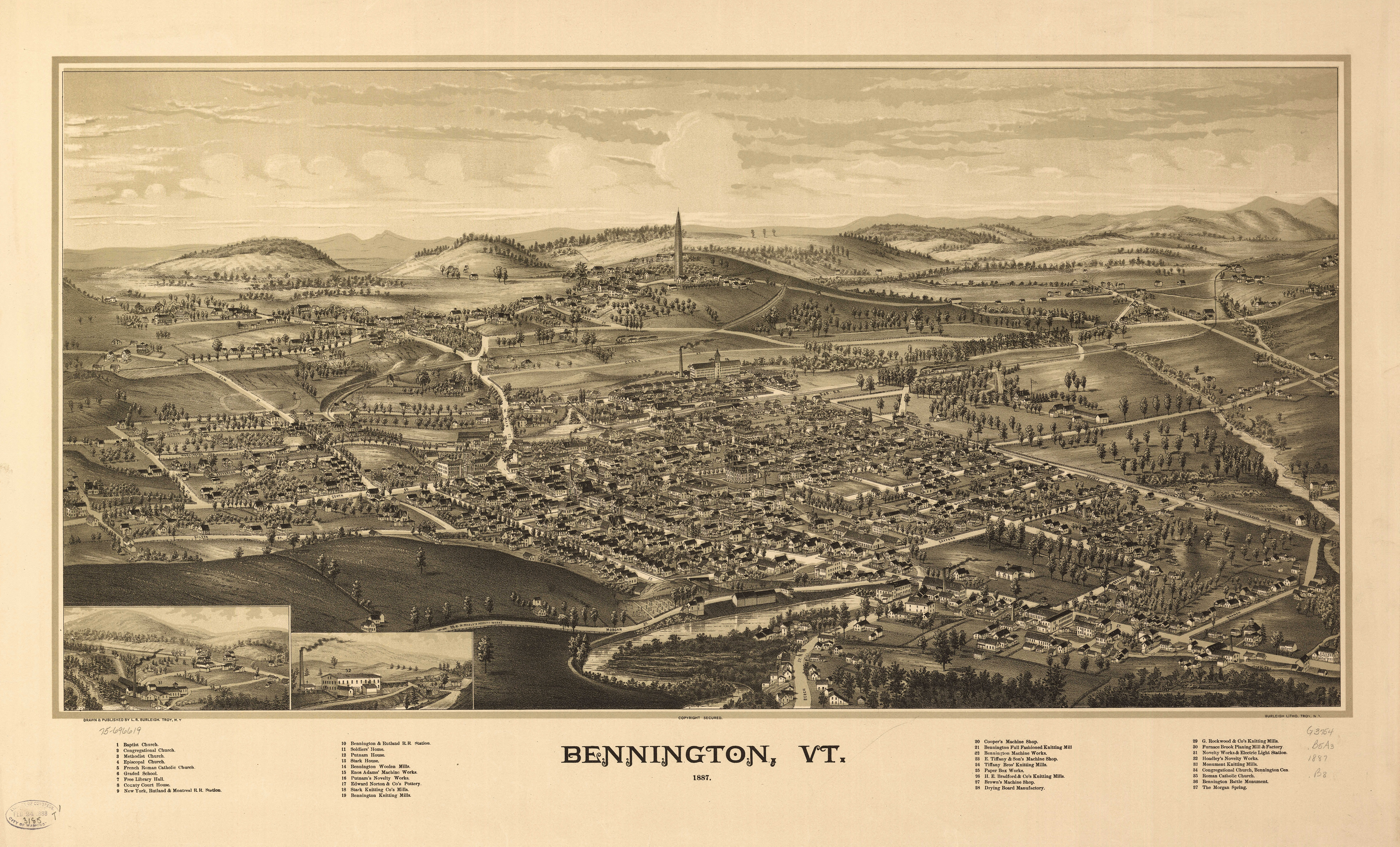
Bennington in 1887

First of the New Hampshire Grants, Bennington was chartered on January 3, 1749, by Colonial Governor Benning Wentworth and named in his honor. It was granted to William Williams and 61 others, mostly from Portsmouth, New Hampshire, making the town the oldest to be chartered in Vermont and outside of what is now New Hampshire, though Brattleboro had been settled earlier as a fort. The town was first settled in 1761 by four families from Hardwick and two from Amherst, Massachusetts. They were led by Capt. Samuel Robinson, who camped in the river valley on his return from the French and Indian War.

Prior to the arrival of colonists, the land belonged to the Western Abenaki of the Wabanaki Confederacy. These peoples were indigenous to Ndakinna—most of what is now northern New England, southern Quebec, and the southern Canadian Maritimes.

There are three historic districts within the town today: Old Bennington, Downtown Bennington and North Bennington. Of these, Old Bennington is the original settlement, dating back to 1761, when Congregational Separatists arrived from Connecticut and from Amherst and Hardwick, Massachusetts. In the early 1800s, Downtown Bennington started developing, and by 1854 the county's population had reached 18,589.

=== Battle of Bennington ===
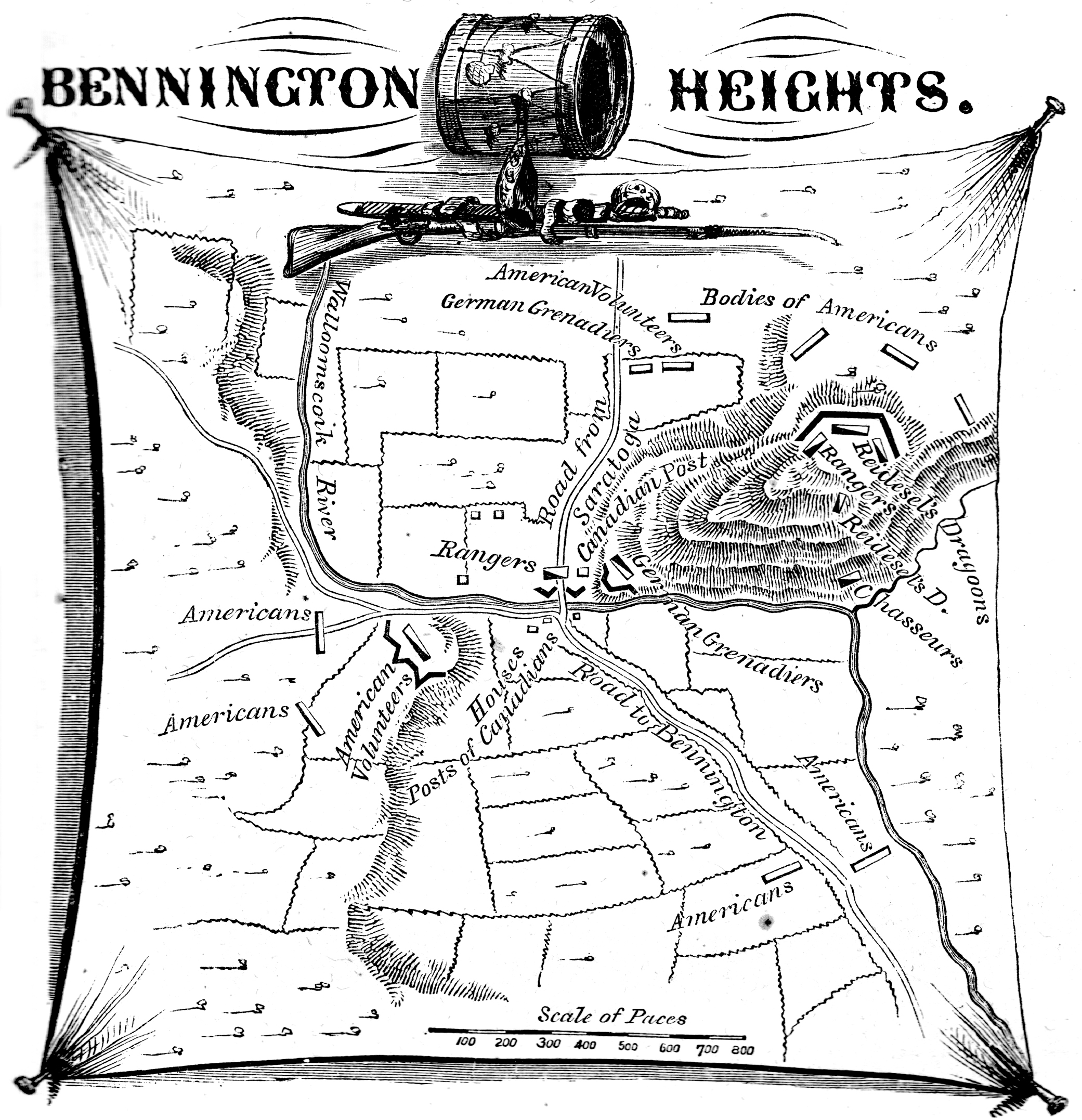
Battle of Bennington Heights, August 16, 1777

The town is known in particular for the Battle of Bennington, which took place during the Revolutionary War. Although the battle took place approximately 12 miles (19 km) to the west in what is now the state of New York, an ammunition storage building located in Bennington was an important strategic target. On August 16, 1777, Gen. John Stark's 1,500-strong New Hampshire Militia defeated 800 German (Hessian) mercenaries, local Loyalists, Canadians and Indians under the command of German Lt. Col. Friedrich Baum. German reinforcements under the command of Lt. Col. Heinrich von Breymann looked set to reverse the outcome, but were prevented by the arrival of Seth Warner's Green Mountain Boys, the Vermont militia founded by Ethan Allen.

In 1891, the Bennington Battle Monument was opened. The monument is a 306-foot-high (93 m) stone obelisk that is the tallest human-made structure in Vermont. It is a popular tourist attraction.

== Geography ==
Bennington is located in southwestern Bennington County. To the west is New York State; Pownal is to the south; Shaftsbury is to the north; and Woodford is to the east.

Located in the southwesternmost portion of Vermont, it is geographically closer to the capital cities of Albany, New York; Hartford, Connecticut; and Concord, New Hampshire than to its own state capital, Montpelier.

According to the United States Census Bureau, the town has a total area of 42.5 square miles (110.1 km^{2}), of which 42.2 square miles (109.4 km^{2}) are land and 0.27 square miles (0.7 km^{2}), or 0.59%, is water. Bennington is drained by the Walloomsac River and its tributaries, flowing to the Hoosic and then the Hudson River. The town is located along the western edge of the Green Mountains, including Bald Mountain, which occupies the northeastern edge of town. (Its 2,857-foot (871 m) summit is just over the town line in Woodford.) In the southwest part of town is 2,350-foot (720 m) Mount Anthony, part of the Taconic Range.

=== Climate ===
Bennington experiences a humid continental climate (Köppen Dfb) with cold, snowy winters and warm to hot, humid summers. Snowfall can vary greatly from year to year. The town can experience snowfall as early as October and as late as April, and the surrounding high country can receive snow as late as May. Nor'easters, accompanied by high winds, often dump heavy snow on the town during the winter, and accumulations of one foot of snow or greater are not uncommon when these storms move through the area. One such storm dumped very wet, heavy snow on October 4, 1987, catching many residents off guard, because it occurred quite early in that year's fall season. The storm resulted in many downed trees and power lines, due in part to that year's fall foliage still being intact. Abundant sunshine, along with heavy showers and thunderstorms, are frequent during the summer months. Although tornadoes seldom occur there, an F2 tornado did hit North Bennington on May 31, 1998, during an extremely rare tornado outbreak in the region.

The record high is 98 °F (37 °C), reached on July 6, 1931; July 24, 1933; August 15 and 24, 1947; August 27, 1948; and July 18, 1953. The record low is −33 °F (−36 °C), set on January 31, 1948. July is typically the wettest month, and February the driest.

Bennington lies in USDA plant hardiness zone 5a.

Climate data for William H. Morse State Airport, Vermont, 1991–2020 normals, extremes 1896–present
Month	Jan	Feb	Mar	Apr	May	Jun	Jul	Aug	Sep	Oct	Nov	Dec	Year
Record high °F (°C)	67 (19)	77 (25)	84 (29)	92 (33)	93 (34)	96 (36)	98 (37)	98 (37)	97 (36)	88 (31)	76 (24)	72 (22)	98 (37)
Mean maximum °F (°C)	58.5 (14.7)	56.0 (13.3)	64.6 (18.1)	79.0 (26.1)	86.9 (30.5)	88.2 (31.2)	90.3 (32.4)	88.8 (31.6)	86.5 (30.3)	76.9 (24.9)	68.5 (20.3)	61.1 (16.2)	91.7 (33.2)
Mean daily maximum °F (°C)	32.2 (0.1)	35.2 (1.8)	43.6 (6.4)	56.9 (13.8)	68.6 (20.3)	76.2 (24.6)	80.6 (27.0)	79.2 (26.2)	72.2 (22.3)	59.9 (15.5)	48.5 (9.2)	37.5 (3.1)	57.5 (14.2)
Daily mean °F (°C)	22.6 (−5.2)	24.8 (−4.0)	33.4 (0.8)	45.5 (7.5)	56.3 (13.5)	64.3 (17.9)	68.9 (20.5)	67.3 (19.6)	60.2 (15.7)	48.9 (9.4)	38.9 (3.8)	29.1 (−1.6)	46.7 (8.2)
Mean daily minimum °F (°C)	13.0 (−10.6)	14.4 (−9.8)	23.2 (−4.9)	34.1 (1.2)	44.0 (6.7)	52.4 (11.3)	57.2 (14.0)	55.3 (12.9)	48.1 (8.9)	37.8 (3.2)	29.3 (−1.5)	20.6 (−6.3)	35.8 (2.1)
Mean minimum °F (°C)	−10.6 (−23.7)	−7.6 (−22.0)	3.1 (−16.1)	20.5 (−6.4)	29.4 (−1.4)	38.6 (3.7)	46.7 (8.2)	43.7 (6.5)	33.2 (0.7)	23.0 (−5.0)	12.9 (−10.6)	−0.6 (−18.1)	−13.3 (−25.2)
Record low °F (°C)	−33 (−36)	−32 (−36)	−25 (−32)	2 (−17)	19 (−7)	26 (−3)	34 (1)	27 (−3)	18 (−8)	11 (−12)	−8 (−22)	−27 (−33)	−33 (−36)
Average precipitation inches (mm)	2.37 (60)	1.94 (49)	2.65 (67)	2.49 (63)	3.47 (88)	4.05 (103)	4.65 (118)	3.86 (98)	3.82 (97)	3.61 (92)	2.77 (70)	2.90 (74)	38.58 (979)
Average precipitation days (≥ 0.01 in)	11.4	10.9	11.3	12.6	13.7	14.2	12.7	13.3	11.1	13.0	11.8	13.2	149.2
Source 1: NOAA
Source 2: XMACIS2

== Demographics ==
Historical population
Census	Pop.	Note	%±
1790	2,377		—
1800	2,243		−5.6%
1810	2,524		12.5%
1820	2,485		−1.5%
1830	3,419		37.6%
1840	3,429		0.3%
1850	3,932		14.7%
1860	4,389		11.6%
1870	5,760		31.2%
1880	6,333		9.9%
1890	6,391		0.9%
1900	8,033		25.7%
1910	8,698		8.3%
1920	9,982		14.8%
1930	10,628		6.5%
1940	11,257		5.9%
1950	12,411		10.3%
1960	13,002		4.8%
1970	14,586		12.2%
1980	15,815		8.4%
1990	16,451		4.0%
2000	15,737		−4.3%
2010	15,764		0.2%
2020	15,333		−2.7%
U.S. Decennial Census

As of the 2010 US census, there were 15,764 people, 6,246 households, and 3,716 families residing in the town. The population density was 370.92 people per square mile (143.18/km^{2}). There were 6,763 housing units at an average density of 159.3 per square mile (61.4/km^{2}). The ethnic/racial makeup of the town was 95.9% White, 1.3% from two or more races, 1.2% Black, 0.8% Asian, 0.4% from other races, 0.3% Native American, and 0.1% Pacific Islander. Latino of any race were 1.7% of the population.

There were 6,246 households, out of which 25.9% had children under the age of 18 living with them, 40.2% were couples living together and joined in either marriage or civil union, 14.2% had a female householder with no husband present, and 40.5% were non-families. 33.0% of all households were made up of individuals, and 14.5% had someone living alone who was 65 years of age or older. The average household size was 2.29 and the average family size was 2.88.

In the town, the population was spread out, with 23.5% under the age of 18, 10.7% from 18 to 24, 26.1% from 25 to 44, 22.0% from 45 to 64, and 17.8% who were 65 years of age or older. The median age was 38 years. For every 100 females, there were 87.0 males. For every 100 females age 18 and over, there were 82.6 males.

The median income for a household in the town was $39,765, and the median income for a family was $51,489. Males had a median income of $39,406 versus $30,322 for females. The per capita income for the town was $23,560. About 14.2% of families and 15.1% of the population were below the poverty line, including 25.0% of those under age 18 and 6.9% of those age 65 or over.

=== Religion ===
There are 22 places of worship in Bennington, 21 Christian and one Jewish, and at least 18 denominations.

== Government ==
Bennington employs an open town meeting form of local government, with an elected seven-member Select Board elected by the town's citizens at large from two districts. The Select Board is considered the "executive branch" of the town's government, which in turn hires and supervises a Town Manager. As of 2021, the town manager is Stuart A. Hurd. The current Town Clerk is Cassandra J. Barbeau.

Four representatives from Bennington's two voting districts currently represent the town in Montpelier. Bennington County is also represented by two state senators.

=== Fire department ===
The town is protected by the Bennington Fire Department, the Bennington Rural Fire Department, and the North Bennington Fire Department. The current chief of the Bennington Fire Department is Jeff Vickers, and the current chief of the Bennington Rural Fire Department is Wayne Davis.

=== Police ===
The town is protected by the Bennington Police Department, which consists of 40 sworn and non-sworn officials serving the town, including the villages of Old Bennington and North Bennington. The police station's home is at 118 South Street in downtown Bennington. Its current Chief of Police is Paul J. Doucette.

== Economy ==
Industries related to agriculture, forestry, fishing, trade and retail, tourism, shipping by air, health care and government related jobs help shape and play a vital role in Bennington's economy. Bennington County has 15,194 non-farm employees living or working within the county as of 2013. Southwestern Vermont Medical Center, with a workforce of approximately 1,300 employees, is the town's largest employer and the seventh largest in Vermont. Its largest for-profit manufacturing employer is NSK Steering Systems America, Inc., with a workforce of 864 as of March 2013. Saint Gobain owns a plastic factory, the former ChemFab plant, which has contaminated the environment with Perfluoroalkyl and Polyfluoroalkyl Substances (PFAS).

Bennington leaders have formed the Bennington Economic Development Partners to facilitate and expedite economic growth, working from a newly created Strategic Economic Development Plan that promotes the benefits afforded to companies located in the local area. Low interest loans, site-ready properties for manufacturing, R&D, Retail, and Technology are a few of the benefits available to new and existing industries.

The Town of Bennington Economic and Community Development Office, the Better Bennington Corporation, the Bennington Area Chamber of Commerce, Bennington County Regional Commission, and Bennington County Industrial Corporation are just some of the partners that coordinate the efforts of the Strategic Plan.

Bennington's "big box" development is mostly confined to the Northside Drive and Kocher Drive corridor in the northern portion of town.

Long time ski clothing company CB Sports was headquartered in Bennington. They operated a popular factory outlet store in town which closed in 2008, due to slow sales as a result of the Great Recession.

=== Downtown ===
Bennington has a historic downtown with businesses that include a chocolatier, bakery, cafes, pizza parlors, Chinese restaurant, live theatre, breweries and distilleries, bookshop, men's and women's clothiers, jewelers, Vermont crafts and products, toy stores, antique stores, music shops, a hobby shop, a country store, an art shop, a museum, and several galleries.

Downtown Bennington is also home to Bennington Potters, Oldcastle Theatre, Hemmings Motor News, Robert Frost's Grave and the Old First Church, the Bennington Museum, Grandma Moses' Schoolhouse, Old Blacksmith Shop Visitor Center, Lucky Dragon, The Blue Benn Diner and Madison's Brewery.

The downtown area is noted for its historically preserved architecture, outdoor seasonal dining, locally owned shops, cafés, Memorial Fountain Park, antique shops, and river walk paralleling the Walloomsac River.

Downtown Bennington is a designated "Vermont Main Street" participant overseen and operated by the Better Bennington Corporation, a nationally accredited National Main Street Program by the National Trust for Historic Preservation.

=== Big box bylaw ===
In January 2005, the Select Board proposed a big box bylaw, primarily in response to Wal-Mart's plans to raze its existing 51,000-square-foot (4,700 m^{2}) outlet and replace it with a 150,000-square-foot (14,000 m^{2}) Supercenter. The potential negative impact on the town's local economy, the low wages paid by Wal-Mart to its employees, and controversies associated with Wal-Mart in general were cited as reasons in support of the bylaw. The bylaw called for a 50,000-to-75,000-square-foot (4,600 to 7,000 m^{2}) cap on big box stores. In addition, any retailer wishing to build a store greater than 30,000 square feet (2,800 m^{2}) of aggregate store space would be required to submit and pay for an evaluation known as a Community Impact Study to the Select Board for approval. Residents voted against the initial proposal in April 2005. However, the Select Board passed a new bylaw on August 1, 2005, that went into effect August 22.

== Education ==
Bennington is home to a variety of municipal, parochial and private schools. Continuing education is supported by a diverse mix of colleges and career development centers. Bennington College is a progressive four-year liberal arts college ranked 89 in Tier 1 by U.S. News College Rankings. Southern Vermont College was a private, four-year liberal arts college offering a career-directed curriculum, but has since closed indefinitely following the 2018–2019 academic year. Northeastern Baptist College opened in 2013. Bennington also has separate satellite campuses of the Community College of Vermont and Vermont Technical College, both located downtown.

Bennington currently has four K–12 public elementary schools:

- Village School of North Bennington (formerly North Bennington Graded School)
- Bennington Elementary School
- Monument Elementary School
- Molly Stark Elementary School

There is one public middle school, the Mount Anthony Union Middle School (MAUMS), and one public high school, the Mount Anthony Union High School (MAUHS). The Southwest Vermont Supervisory Union oversees Bennington's public school system, which also includes a career center, the Southwestern Vermont Career Development Center, located on MAUHS' campus.

Grace Christian School is a private, faith-based K–12 school founded in 1995.

=== High school sports ===
Bennington is home to the 38-time defending state wrestling champion Mount Anthony Patriots. They have won 38 consecutive Vermont state wrestling championships as of the 2025 season. This is the national record.

As of 2010, the Mount Anthony Patriots have also been state champions in men's and women's Nordic skiing, baseball, football, golf, men's soccer and women's lacrosse.

== Transportation ==
=== Roads and highways ===
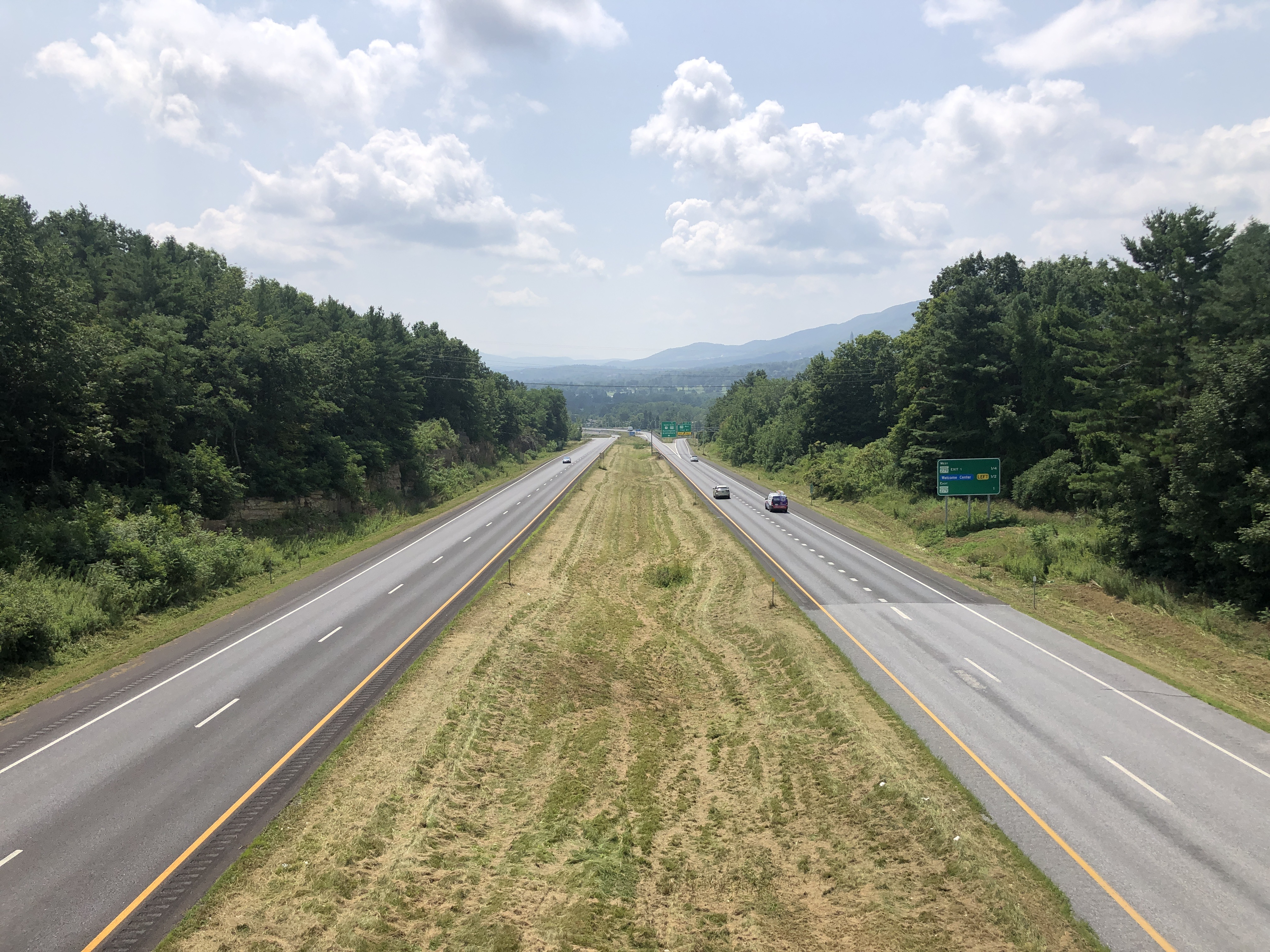
US 7 southbound approaching downtown Bennington

Bennington is the largest town, and the second-largest municipality in Vermont (after Rutland City), that is not located on or near either of Vermont's two major Interstate highways. It is, however, signed on Interstate 91 at Exit 2 in Brattleboro and Interstate 787 at Exit 9E in Green Island, New York.

Five highways cross the town, including two limited-access freeways. They are:

- U.S. Route 7 ("Ethan Allen Highway")
- Vermont Route 9 ("Molly Stark Trail")
- Vermont Route 7A ("Shires of Vermont Byway")
- Vermont Route 67A
- Vermont Route 279 ("Bennington Bypass")

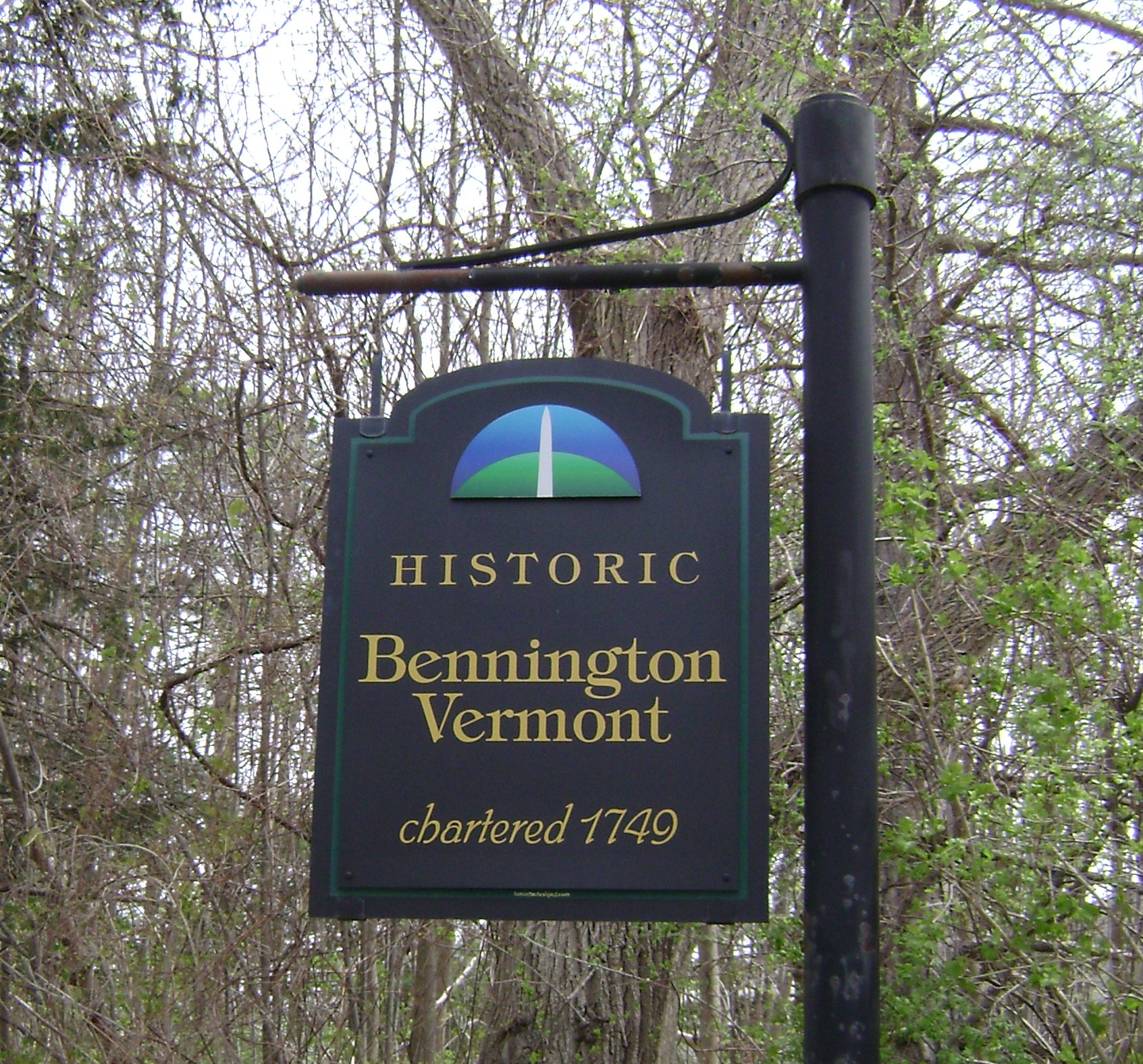
The sign for historic Bennington, Vermont

U.S. Route 7, originating in Connecticut and continuing northward to the Canada–US border, enters Bennington from the town of Pownal.

VT Route 9 enters the town from the New York border in Hoosick, where the roadway continues west as NY Route 7, connecting to New York state's Capital District.

VT Route 279, also known as the Bennington Bypass, is a Super 2 freeway. The western segment continues westward as NY Reference Route 915G (unsigned) into Hoosick, New York, before meeting NY Route 7. This road forms a rough semi-circle shape around and north of the center of the town, loosely paralleling VT Route 9 while doing so. A Vermont Welcome Center, located at the center of Route 279's interchange with US 7.

Historic VT Route 7A, so named to distinguish it from the freeway portion of US 7, is the former alignment of that road prior to the freeway being built.

Vermont Route 67A remains within Bennington for its entire length.

=== Bus ===
Bennington is home to the Green Mountain Community Network, who operate the local Green Mountain Express bus service. As of September 29, 2014, they provide five in-town routes Monday through Saturday from 7:35 am to 6 pm on weekdays, and three out of town commuter routes serving Manchester (weekdays and Saturdays), Williamstown (weekdays) and Wilmington (weekdays in collaboration with Southeast Vermont Transit, formerly the Deerfield Valley Transit Association's, "MOOver"), and intermediate points.

Intercity bus service is provided by the weekday operating Yankee Trails World Travel's Albany-Bennington Shuttle, as well as by Premier Coach's Vermont Translines, in its partnership with Greyhound, which operates its Albany to Burlington bus line daily. Both buses serve the town from GMCN's bus terminal.

=== Taxi ===
A few taxi companies, including Bennington Taxi, Walt's Taxi and Monument Taxi, currently serve Bennington and surrounding areas. Uber and Lyft ridesharing is also available there.

=== Rail ===
The Vermont Railway freight rail line, and an exempt rail spur, traverses Bennington in the northern portions. The closest Amtrak train station is at the Joseph Scelsi Intermodal Transportation Center in Pittsfield, Massachusetts, served by the Boston to Chicago Lake Shore Limited train. Amtrak train service is also available from Renssalaer, New York.

=== Air ===
William H. Morse State Airport is a public-use, state-owned airport located about 3 miles (5 km) west of downtown Bennington. Also referred to as "Southwest Vermont's Airport", it sits near the northern flank of Mount Anthony and close to the Bennington Battle Monument. Based at this airport is the hub of cargo air carrier AirNow. The closest commercial passenger airport to Bennington is Albany International Airport.

== Parks and recreation ==
The town runs Willow Park, a large park north of downtown, which hosts athletic fields, an 18-hole disc-golf course, a common area for group functions and a large children's playground. The town also runs a recreation center on Gage Street, which contains a large indoor year-round swimming pool, softball fields, outdoor basketball court and weight room. Bennington also has a small network of mostly disconnected multi-use recreational trails; there are plans to better connect these paths in the future.

The closest state parks to Bennington are Lake Shaftsbury State Park in Shaftsbury and Woodford State Park in Woodford. The Long Trail and Appalachian Trail overlap each other as they pass the town just to the east.

== Culture ==
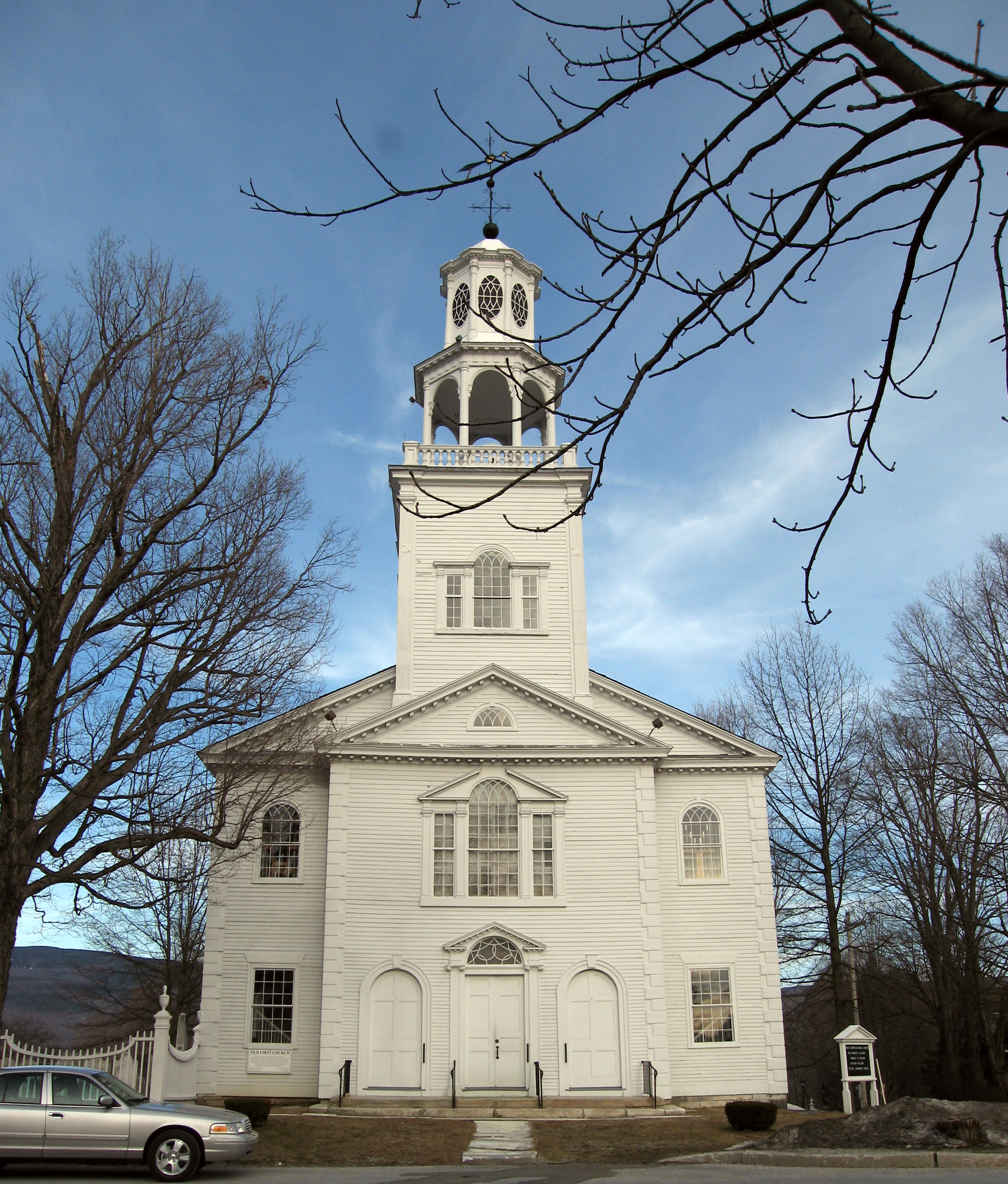
First Congregational Church in Bennington

=== Arts ===
Bennington is the former home of the Chamber Music Conference and Composers' Forum of the East, a summer institute for amateur musicians. The Conference was held on the campus of Bennington College. Bennington is also home to the Oldcastle Theatre Company, a small professional theatre with a special interest in encouraging New England plays.

Bennington College, in the village of North Bennington, has been the home base for Sage City Symphony since its founding in 1973 by Louis Calabro. The Symphony plays a challenging program of the traditional repertoire as well as commissioning a new work each year.

The Vermont Arts Exchange (VAE) is a non-profit community arts organization based in North Bennington. The mission of the VAE is to strengthen communities and neighborhoods through the arts. VAE hosts exhibitions, artist and community workspaces, and the Basement Music Series. Concerts run year-round and showcase a variety of nationally acclaimed musicians.

Bennington is home to the Bennington County Choral Society, the Bennington Children's Chorus and the Green Mountain Youth Orchestra.

=== Annual events ===
- First Fridays in Downtown Bennington, July through October
- Fallapalooza!, store-to-store trick-or-treating on the Saturday before Halloween
- The Winter Festival and Penguin Plunge at Lake Paran in North Bennington in late January benefits Special Olympics of Vermont.
- The St. Patrick's Day Parade in March
- Mayfest in May, an annual showcase of local business vendors
- The Memorial Day Parade in May
- Midnight Madness in July, hours and discounts vary but nearly all retailers participate; 7 p.m. to midnight
- The Bennington Battle Day Parade in August
- The Garlic and Herb Festival during Labor Day weekend
- The Festival of Trees in late November and early December

=== Print media ===
Bennington's local newspaper is the Bennington Banner, with a daily circulation of 7,800. News is also carried in the Troy Record, Rutland Herald and Manchester Journal.

=== Radio and television ===
Bennington is located in a fringe viewing area of the Albany-Schenectady-Troy television market. In addition to the Albany television stations, which include WRGB (CBS), WTEN (ABC), WNYT (NBC), WXXA-TV (Fox) and WMHT (PBS), Comcast carries WCAX-TV, the Burlington CBS affiliate, and Rutland Vermont PBS outlet WVER.

The radio stations WBTN-AM 1370 and VPR affiliate WBTN-FM 94.3 broadcast from, and are licensed to Bennington. The alternative music radio station WEQX is located in nearby Manchester. Bennington is also within range of several stations from Glens Falls and the Capital District.

Bennington is also the town of license for these radio station translators:

- 93.5 FM W228BL (VPR Classical)
- 98.5 FM W253AF (translator of WNGN-FM from Argyle, NY, Contemporary Christian)

== Sites of interest ==
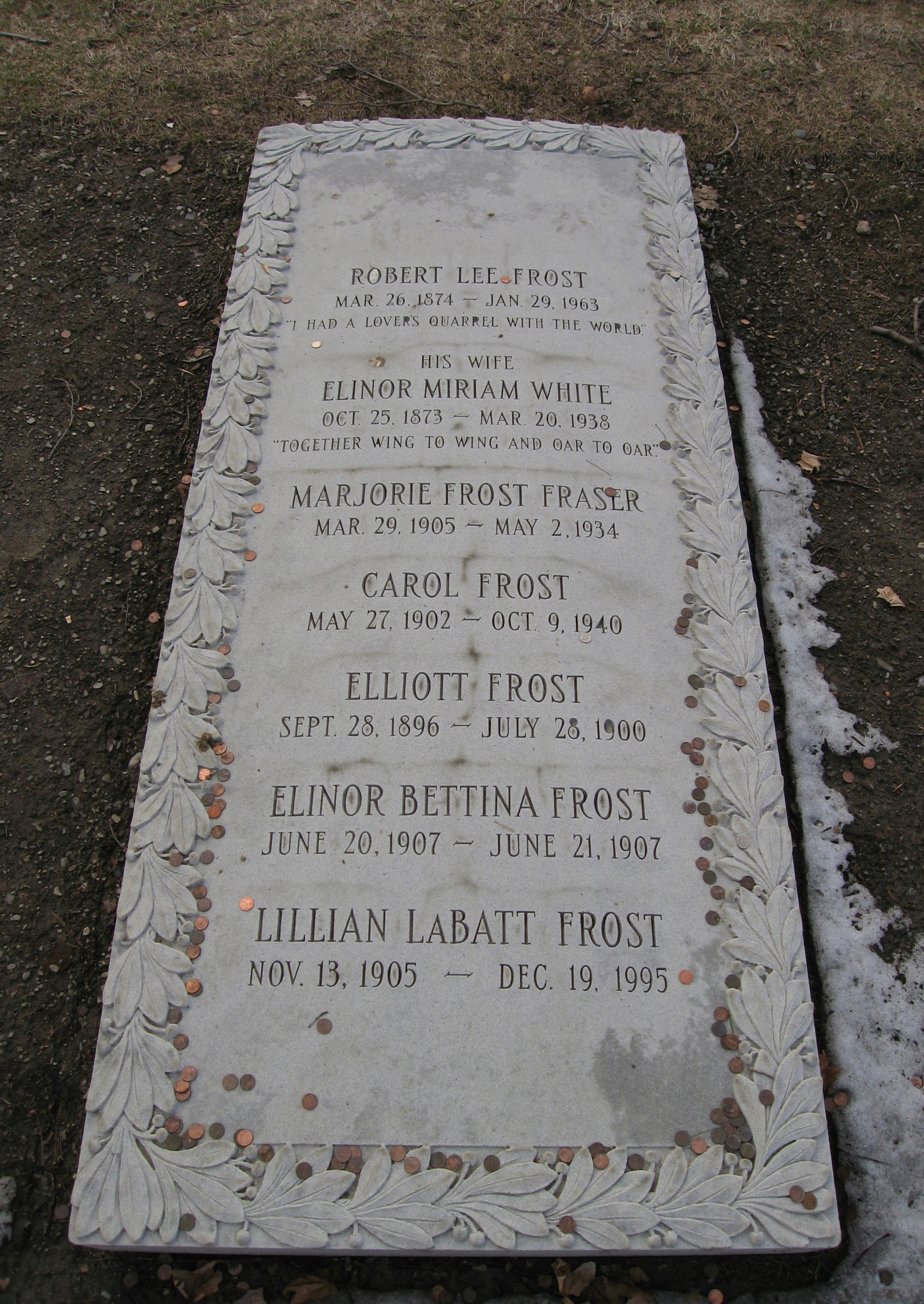
Robert Frost's grave

- Bennington Battle Monument
- Grandma Moses Gallery at the Bennington Museum
- Park-McCullough Historic House, a well-preserved, 35-room, Victorian country house
- Robert Frost's grave
- Bennington College
- Southern Vermont College

=== Photo gallery ===
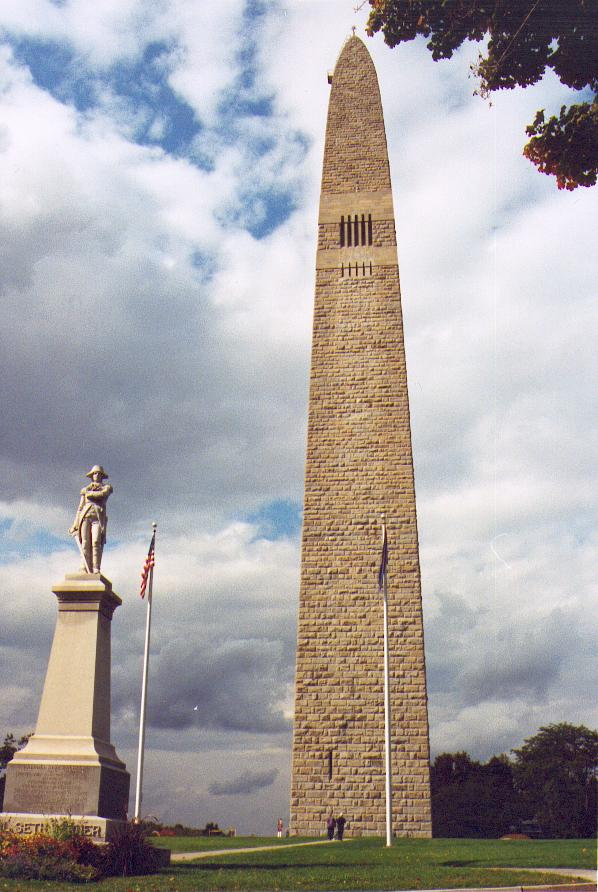
Bennington Battle Monument

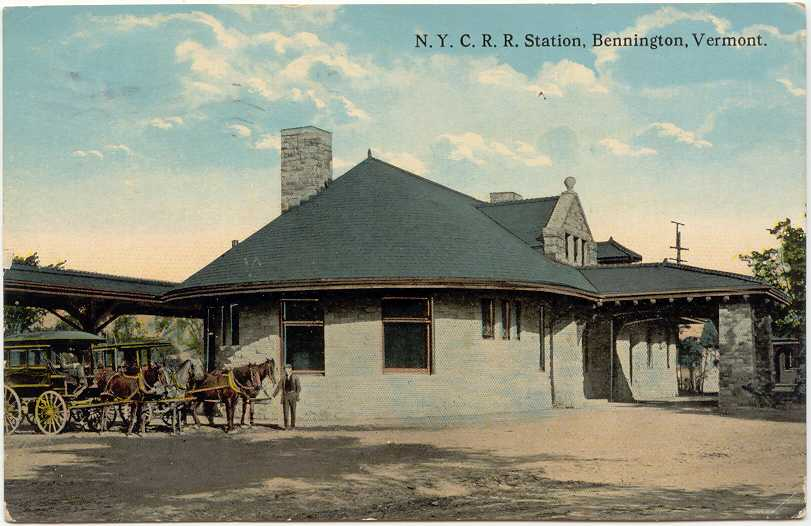
N.Y.C.R.R. station in 1913

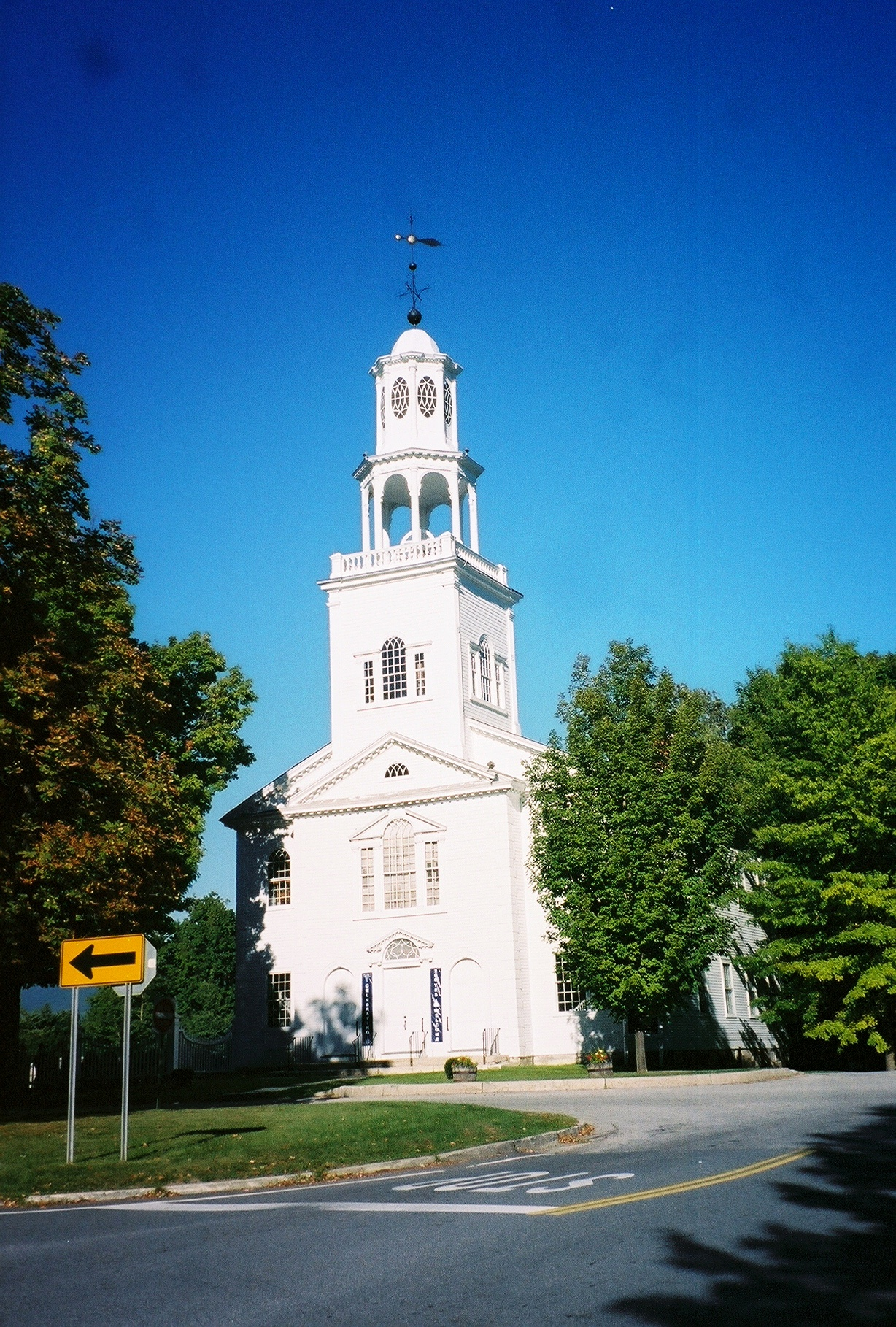
First Congregational Church of Bennington, 1804

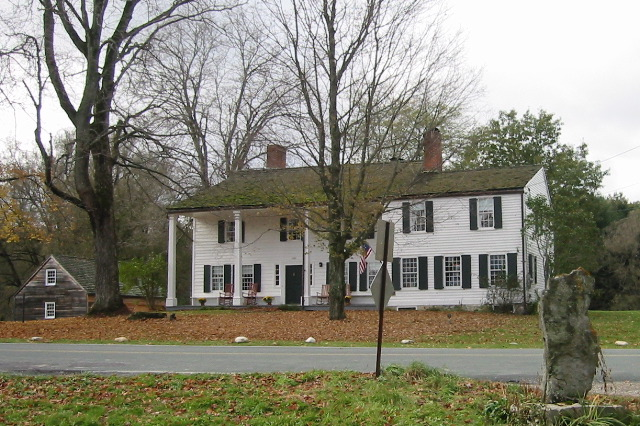
Henry House, 1769

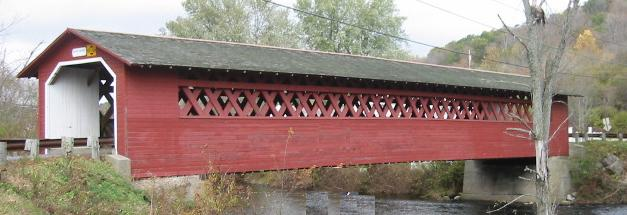
Burt Henry Covered Bridge, 1835

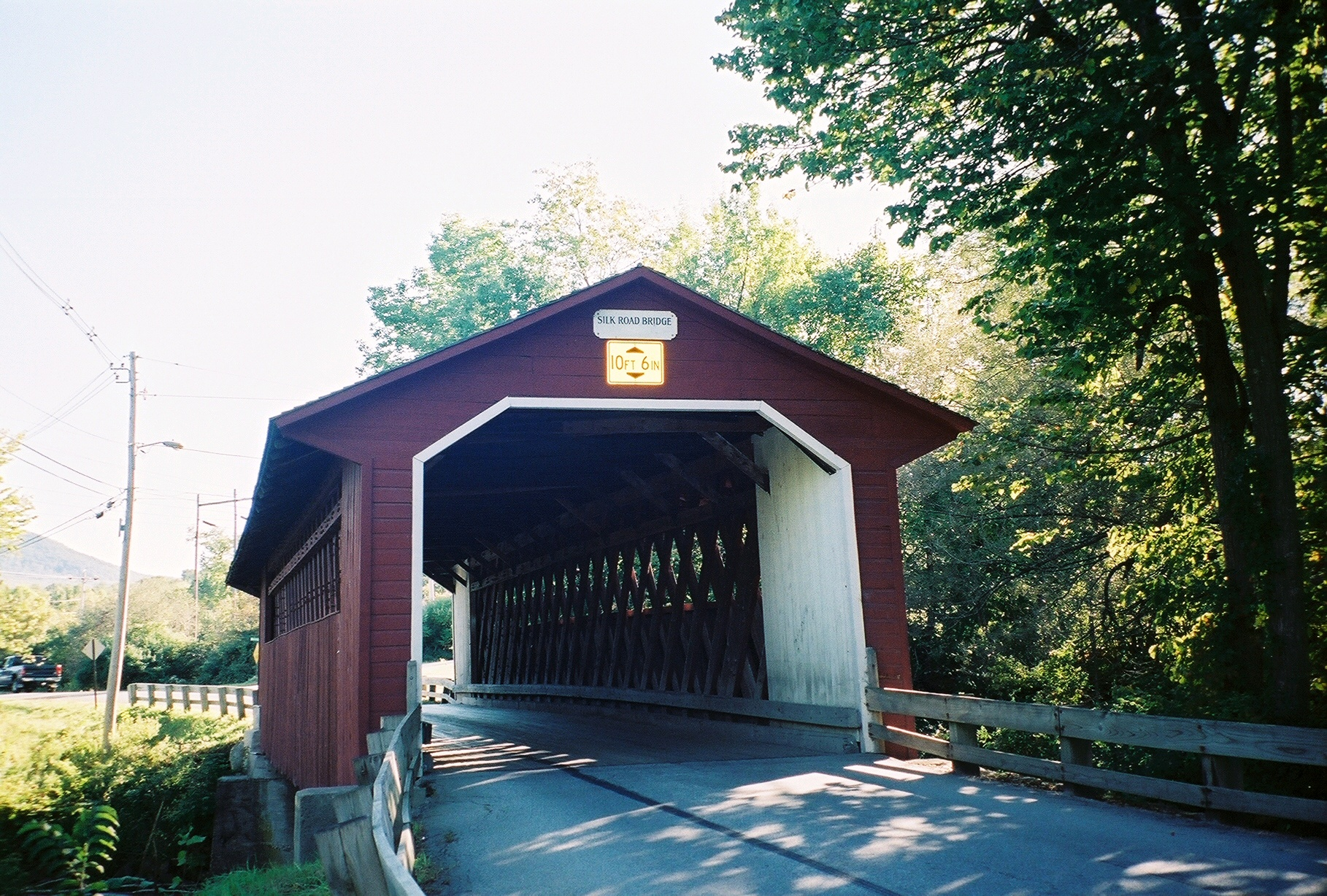
Silk Covered Bridge, 1840

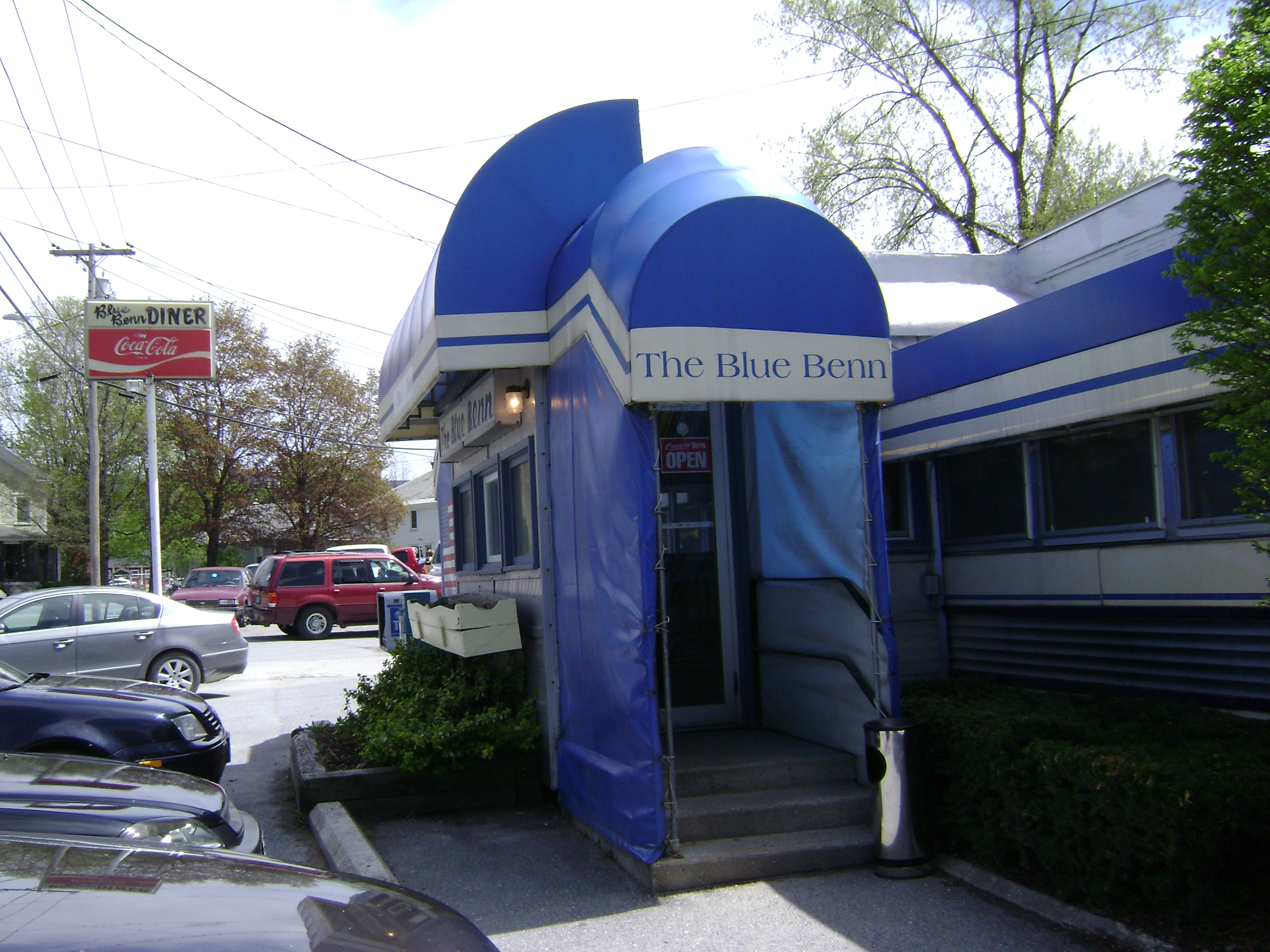
The Blue Benn, a historic diner in Bennington

== Infrastructure ==
=== Health care ===
- Bennington is home to Southwestern Vermont Medical Center, a community hospital that serves southern Vermont, northwestern Massachusetts, and neighboring eastern New York counties. The medical center also has satellite clinics in Manchester, Pownal, and Wilmington.
- The Bennington Rescue Squad provides the primary 911 service in Bennington, as well as non-emergency and interfacility transfers.
- A number of primary and specialty care providers practice in the Bennington area, most being affiliated with the Southwestern Vermont Healthcare system.
- United Counseling Services (UCS) provides all of Bennington County with services for mental health, developmental disabilities, and substance abuse. The agency is headquartered in Bennington and has a satellite office in Manchester.

=== Utilities ===
Bennington's electricity is supplied by Green Mountain Power. Non-purchased surface and groundwater is supplied by the Bolles Brook in Woodford and the Morgan Spring in Bennington, respectively. The Bennington Water Department manages both water sources.

Cable television in Bennington is provided by Comcast. Comcast and Consolidated Communications also provide the town with landline phone and high speed Internet services.

== In popular culture ==
- Author Shirley Jackson's memoirs, Life Among the Savages and Raising Demons, depict mid-20th century life in Bennington.
- Much of the 1974 action film The Catamount Killing, starring Horst Buchholz, Ann Wedgeworth and Polly Holliday, was filmed in Bennington.
- The Walloomsac Farmers Market, held in Bennington each Saturday, ranked #72 on The Daily Meal's 101 Best Farmer's Markets for 2014 list.
- Southern Vermont College's Everett Mansion was featured in a 2015 episode of SyFy's Ghost Hunters.

== See also ==
- Bennington Free Library
- Bennington Triangle
