= Indiana Free Library =

Coordinates: 40.62305°N 79.15515°W

Indiana Free Library is located in the middle of the town on the corner of 9th and Philadelphia Streets in Indiana, Pennsylvania, in the Community Center Building which also houses the Jimmy Stewart Museum and the Downtown Indiana offices. The service area, a population of 32,924 by the 2010 Census, is the Indiana School District which includes Indiana Borough (pop. 13,975), White Township (pop. 15,821), and Armstrong Township (pop. 2,998) with Shelocta Borough (pop. 333). It was originally located in a Reading Room started by the New Century Club in 1907 in a building not that far from where it is now. After moving through several locations, was installed in the Community Building in 1934. The Community Building was built in 1912 but served as a YMCA during the 1920s and 1930s. A recent remodeling was completed in 2019 to refresh building systems and update the appearance of the interior and exterior surfaces. On May 16, 2007, it celebrated its 100th year of having a public library in Indiana, PA. The library is an independent state-aided non-profit corporation under Commonwealth Libraries, a state agency regulating the Pennsylvania library system. Library cards are offered to residents of supporting municipalities included in the Indiana School District at the county seat. Other county residents may purchase an annual $25. card and be served from the surrounding municipalities which have opted out of library service. There are 47,407 residents in Indiana County currently unserved by a local library.

The Indiana Free Library offers a quality collection of print and recorded materials with fiction, non-fiction, young adult, large print, magazines, children's books, and Audio Visual categories. There are a number of digital services available from the library website including an online catalog of materials and services available for cardholders supporting workforce development, early literacy, homework helps and a wealth of resources.
