= Lattice truss bridge =

Type of truss bridge

Lattice Truss Bridge
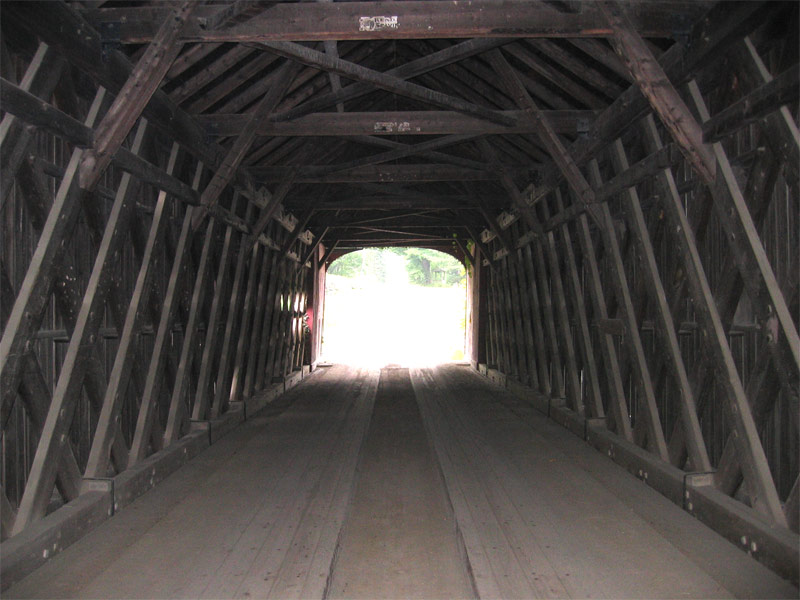
- Interior structure of a covered bridge utilizing a plank-lattice structure
- Span range: short to medium
- Material: wood planks and beams or steel angles and beams, appropriate decking material
- Movable: No
- Design effort: medium
- Falsework required: Sometimes

A lattice truss bridge is a form of truss bridge that uses many small, closely spaced diagonal elements forming a lattice. The design was patented in 1820 by architect Ithiel Town.

Originally a means of erecting a substantial bridge from mere planks employing lower skilled labor, rather than heavy timbers and more expensive carpenters and equipment, the lattice truss has also been constructed using many relatively light iron or steel members. The individual elements are more easily handled by the construction workers, but the bridge also requires substantial support during construction. A simple lattice truss will transform the applied loads into a thrust, as the bridge will tend to change length under load. This is resisted by pinning the lattice members to the top and bottom chords, which are more substantial than the lattice members, but which may also be fabricated from relatively small elements rather than large beams.

== Belfast truss ==
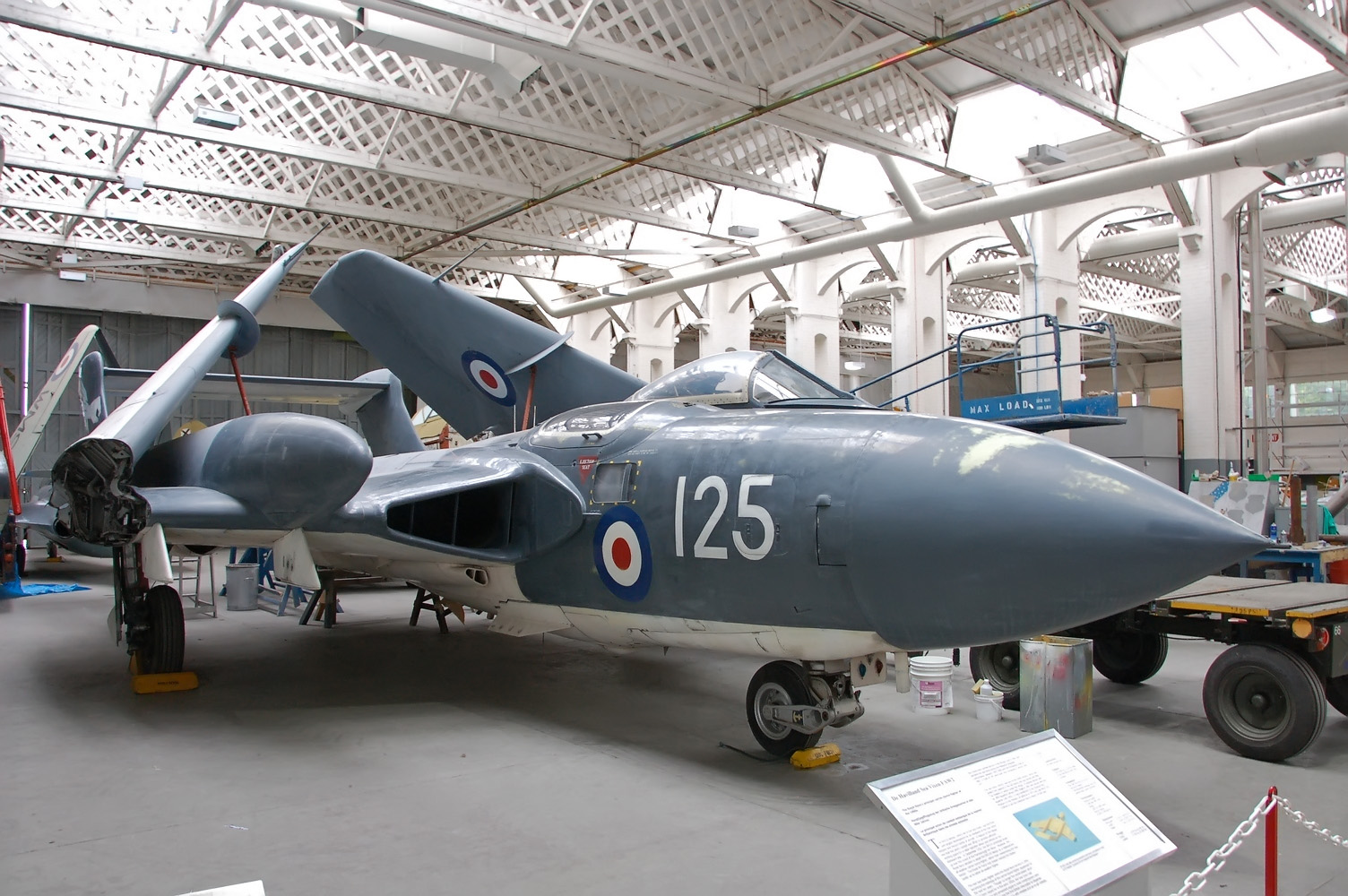
Belfast trusses as roof supports in an aircraft hangar from the First World War at the Duxford Imperial War Museum

The Belfast truss is a cross between Town's lattice truss and the bowstring truss. It was developed in Ireland as a wide-span shallow rise roof truss for industrial structures. McTear & Co of Belfast, Ireland began fabricating these trusses in wood starting around 1866. By 1899, spans of 24 metres (79 ft) had been achieved, and in the 20th century, shipyards and airplane hangars demanded ever greater clear spans.

== Wood lattice truss bridges ==
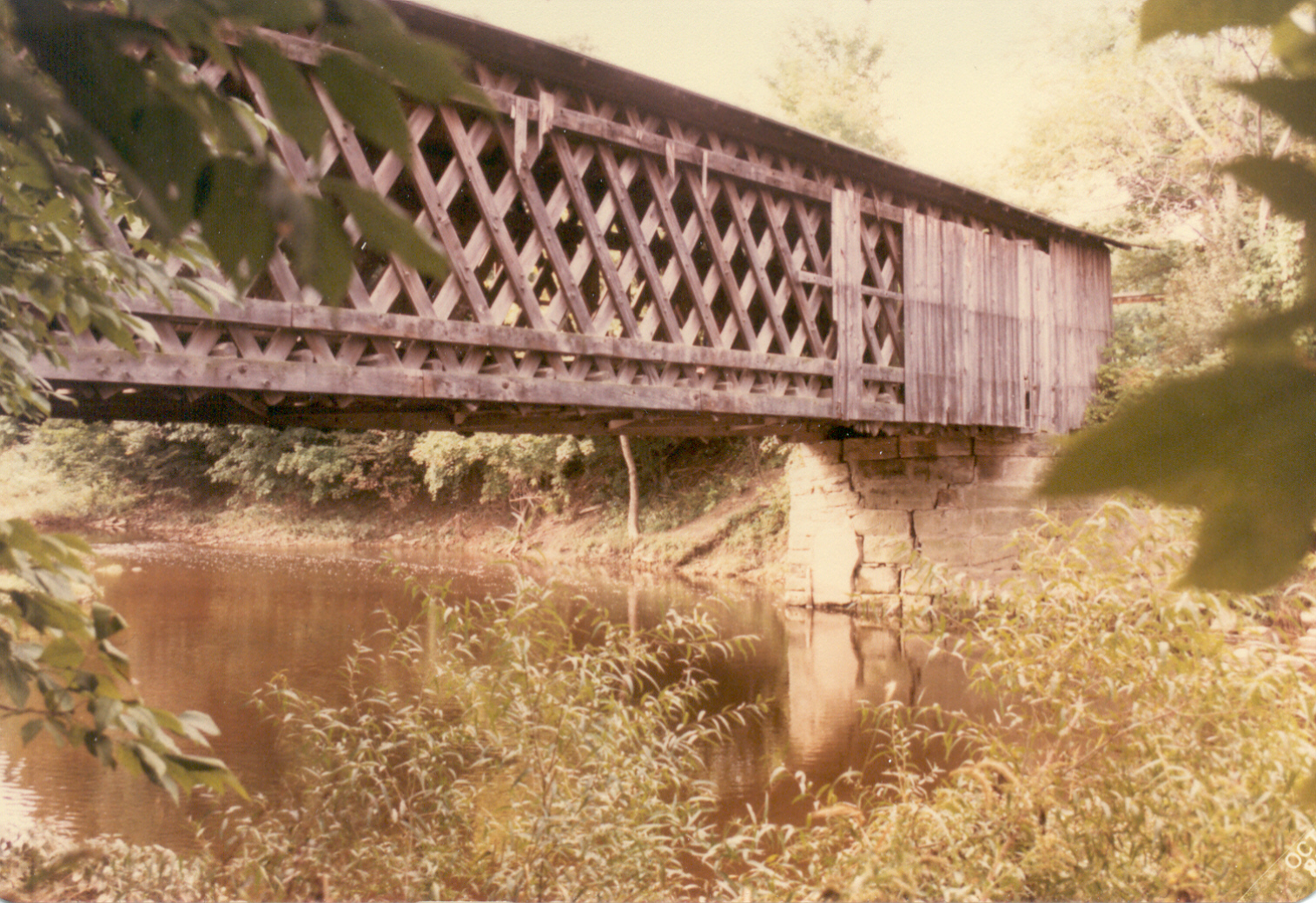
Root Road Covered Bridge, Ashtabula County, Ohio

- Bartonsville Covered Bridge
- Brown Covered Bridge
- Burt Henry Covered Bridge
- Cornish-Windsor Covered Bridge
- Euharlee Covered Bridge
- Frankenfield Covered Bridge
- Green River Covered Bridge
- Kingsley Covered Bridge
- Newton Falls Covered Bridge, Newton Falls, Ohio
- Poole's Mill Covered Bridge
- Root Road Covered Bridge
- Uhlerstown Covered Bridge
- Van Tran Flat Bridge
- Waterford Covered Bridge
- Watson Mill Covered Bridge
- Windsor Mills Covered Bridge
- Worrall Covered Bridge
- Zehnder's HolzBrücke

== Iron or steel lattice truss bridges ==
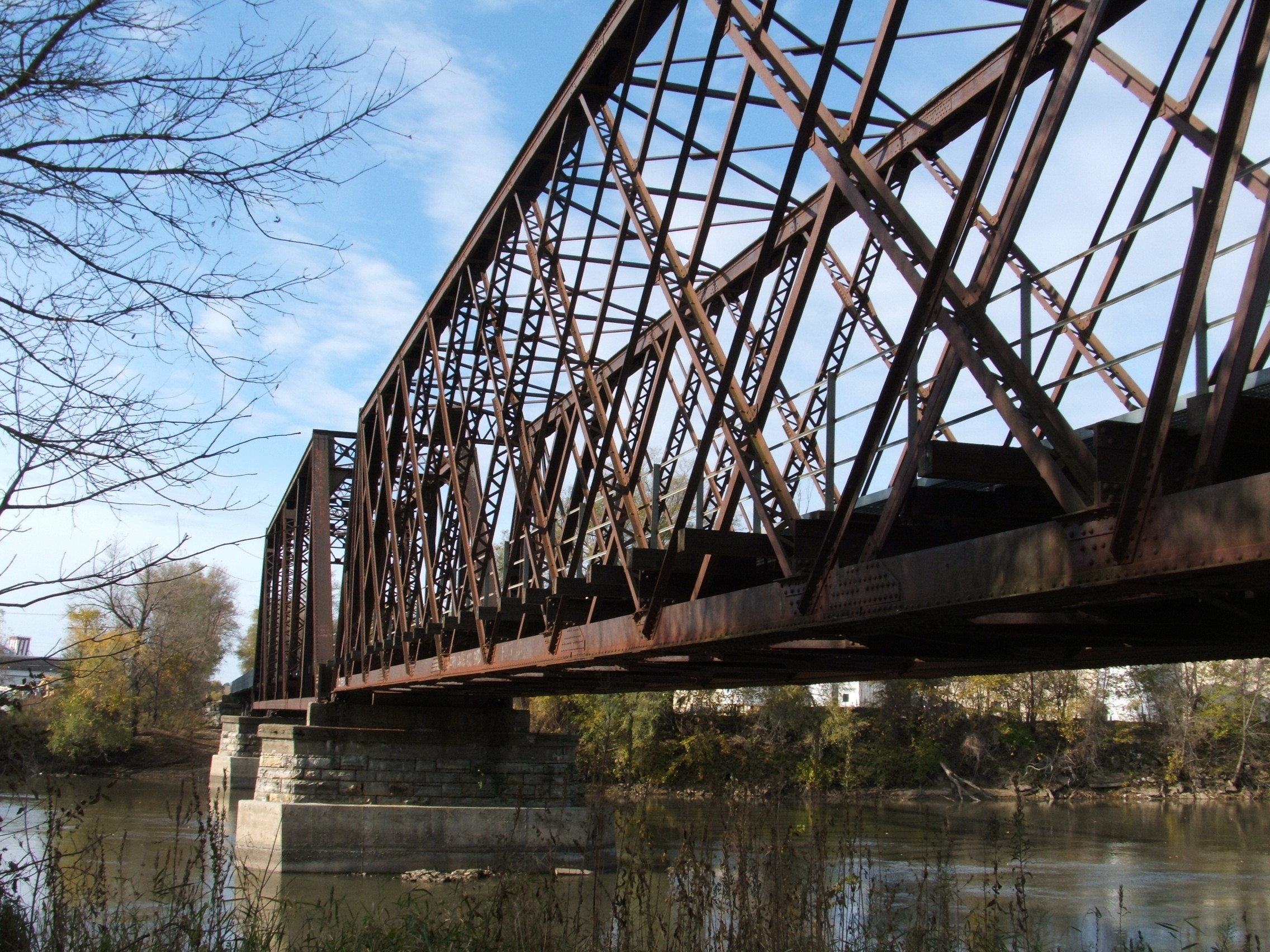
Railroad bridge across the Iowa River in Iowa City, Iowa

Howard Carroll built the first completely wrought-iron lattice truss bridge. This was built for the New York Central Railroad in 1859.

- Bennerley Viaduct
- Bridge in Brown Township
- Dowery Dell Viaduct, also known as Hunnington or Frankley Viaduct
- Kew Railway Bridge
- Norwottuck Rail Trail Bridge
- Upper Slate Run Bridge (1890), a 'quintangular' lattice truss in Lycoming County, Pennsylvania
- Willow Creek Bridge (1913), in Pierce County, Nebraska

== See also ==
- Brown truss
- Lattice girder
