= Northfield =

Northfield may refer to:

- Northfield (surname)

== Places ==
=== United Kingdom ===
- Northfield, Aberdeen, Scotland
- Northfield, Edinburgh, Scotland
- Northfield, Birmingham, England
- Northfield (Kettering ward), Northamptonshire, England
- Northfield (Ealing ward), London, England
- Northfield, Milton Keynes, England
- Northfield/Mastrick North, council ward in Aberdeen, Scotland

=== United States ===
- Northfield, Connecticut
- Northfield, Delaware County, New York
- Northfield, Illinois
- Northfield, Indiana
- Northfield, Kentucky
- Northfield, Maine
- Northfield, Massachusetts, a New England town
  - Northfield (CDP), Massachusetts, a census-designated place in the town
  - Northfield Main Street Historic District
- Northfield, Michigan, an unincorporated community
- Northfield, Minnesota
- Northfield, New Jersey
- Northfield, New Hampshire
- Northfield, Ohio
- Northfield, Staten Island, a former town in New York
- Northfield, Vermont, town
  - Northfield (CDP), Vermont, the main settled area in the town
  - Northfield (village), Vermont, smaller village within the CDP; no longer incorporated
- Northfield, Wisconsin, town
- Northfield (community), Wisconsin, unincorporated community

=== Elsewhere ===
- Northfield, South Australia
- Northfield Parish, New Brunswick, Canada
- Northfield, Nova Scotia (disambiguation), several places in Canada
- Northfield, Quebec, in the city of Gracefield, Canada

== Education ==
- Northfield Academy, secondary school in Aberdeen, Scotland
- Northfield School (disambiguation)

== Other uses ==
- Northfield Center Cemetery, a historic cemetery in Northfield, Massachusetts
- Northfield Chateau, a former mansion in Northfield, Massachusetts
- Northfield House, a historic house in Preston, East Lothian, Scotland
- Northfield Laboratories
- Northfield Library, Birmingham, England
- Northfield Manor House, Birmingham, England
- Northfield Mountain, Massachusetts
- Northfield News, a weekly newspaper in Vermont
- Northfield Park Arboretum, Gering, Nebraska
- Northfield Park Racino, a racino in Northfield, Ohio
- Northfield Public Library, Minnesota
- Northfield railway line, former railway line in Adelaide, South Australia
- Northfield railway station, Birmingham, England
- Northfield Savings Bank, a bank based in Vermont
- Northfield Square, a shopping mall in Bradley, Illinois
- Northfield Town F.C., an amateur football club based in Birmingham, England
- Northfield Union Church, a historic church in Northfield, New Hampshire
- "Northfield", hymn by Jeremiah Ingalls

== See also ==
- North Field (disambiguation)
- Northfield Falls, a village in Northfield, Vermont
- Northfield Falls Covered Bridge, a bridge in Northfield, Vermont
- Northfield station (disambiguation)
- Northfield Township (disambiguation)
- Northfields (disambiguation)
