= Harry Bates Thayer =

American electric and telecommunications businessman

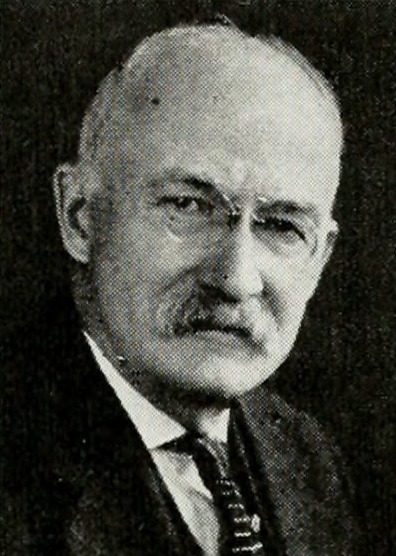

5th President of American Telephone & Telegraph
- In office 1919–1925
- Preceded by: Theodore Newton Vail
- Succeeded by: Walter Sherman Gifford

Personal details
- Born: August 17, 1858 Northfield, Vermont
- Died: September 3, 1936 (aged 78) New Canaan, Connecticut
- Spouse: Carrie Motte Ransom (m. 1887; died 1916)
- Children: 3
- Education: Norwich University
- Alma mater: Dartmouth College
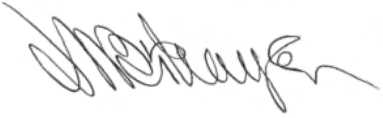
- Signature

Harry Bates Thayer (August 17, 1858 – September 3, 1936), was an American electrical and telephone businessman.

== Early life ==
Thayer was born on August 17, 1858, in Northfield, Vermont. He was a son of James Carey Barroll Thayer (1824–1897) and Martha Jane (née Pratt) Thayer (1824–1869), a daughter of John A. and Sarah Pratt. His father, a son of Samuel White Thayer and Ruth (née Packard) Thayer, owned a clothing store and was a founder of Northfield Savings Bank.

He was a descendant of Alden Thayer, Governor Brewster, and other early New England settlors.

He was educated at Northfield High School in Northfield, Vermont. He then attended Norwich University (the Military College of Vermont) for 2 years before attending Dartmouth College, from which he graduated in 1879.

== Career ==
After six months working in the Station Agent's office at the Bellows Falls railway station, he became a shipping clerk at $10 per week at Western Electric Company. He was the International department manager in 1897. He traveled to Japan in 1896 and subsequently initiated Western Electric's participation in the forming of Nippon Electric Company, Ltd., where his assistant, Walter Tenney Carleton became a founding director. Thayer soon became the general manager in New York City and later vice-president.

He served as the 4th President of Western Electric from October 1908 to July 1919. He became vice-president at AT&T, American Telephone & Telegraph. He left Western Electric Company in July 1919 to succeed his close friend Theodore Vail as president of AT&T. In 1920 the telephone system was de-nationalized by the Willis-Graham Act, freeing AT&T to acquire independent telephone companies. Under Thayer, AT&T flourished as a regulated monopoly and spread into radio broadcasting. In 1925, the research activities of AT&T and Western Electric were consolidated into Bell Labs. In 1925, Thayer resigned the presidency and became board chairman at AT&T, continuing in that role until he resigned in 1928.

== Personal life ==
On April 26, 1887, Thayer was married to Carrie Motte Ransom (1864–1916) in Porter, New York. Carrie was a daughter of Eliza Jane (née Estes) Ransom and William Henry Harrison Ransom, a founder of Ransomville, New York (a hamlet in Porter). After living on Staten Island and then Kingsbridge, the Thayers settled in New Canaan, Connecticut, in 1903. Together, they had three children:

- Dorothy Thayer (1889–1946), who married Floyd Clark Noble, a son of Henry George Stebbins Noble (the president of the New York Stock Exchange from 1914 to 1919).
- Ruth Thayer (1892–1982), who married Webb William Weeks. After his death, she married her late sisters widower, Floyd Clarke Noble.
- John Alden Thayer (1895–1964), who married Dorothy Weeks Scudder, a granddaughter of U.S. Representative Henry Joel Scudder, in Suffolk Co. in 1917. He was owner and editor of The Ridgefield Press and, later, mayor of Delray, Florida.

Carrie Thayer died in New Canaan in May 1916. After a long illness, Thayer died at his home in New Canaan on September 3, 1936.

From 1937 until 2011 the primary dining facility at Dartmouth College was named Thayer Hall in honor of his service to the College, which included serving on the Board of Trustees.

== See also ==
- Telephone in United States history
