= Upper Cox Brook Covered Bridge =

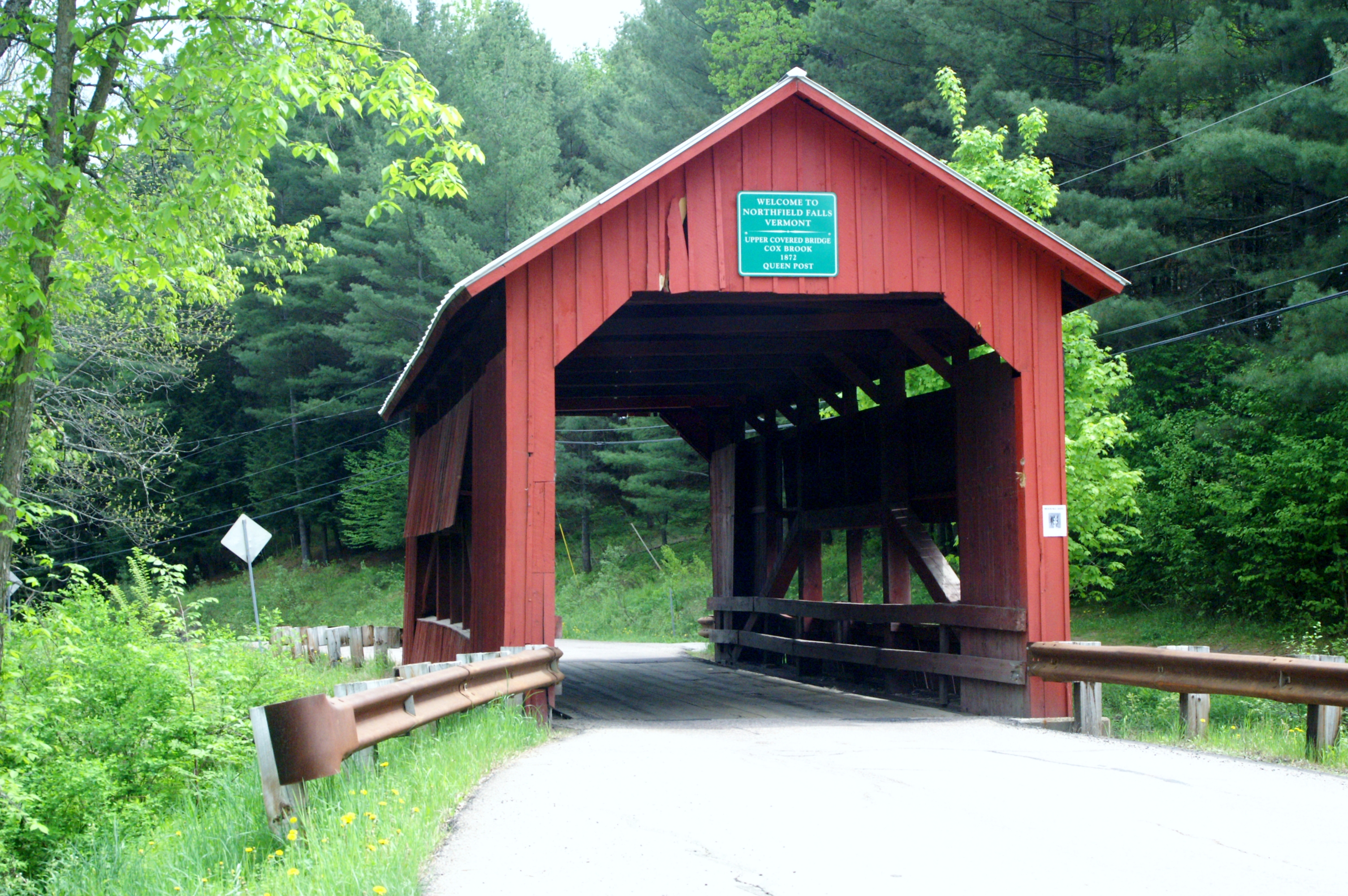
- Bridge in U.S. state of Vermont
- Coordinates: 44°10′26″N 72°39′18″W
- Carries: Automobile
- Crosses: Cox Brook
- Locale: Northfield, Vermont
- Maintained by: Town of Northfield
- ID number: VT-12-11

Characteristics
- Design: Covered, Queen post
- Material: Wood
- Total length: 51.25 ft (15.62 m)
- Width: 14.1 ft (4.3 m)
- No. of spans: 1
- Clearance above: 12 ft (3.7 m)

History
- Constructed by: unknown
- Construction end: 1872
- Upper Cox Brook Covered Bridge
- U.S. National Register of Historic Places
- Location within Vermont Location within the United States
- Coordinates: 44°10′25″N 72°39′19″W
- Area: 1 acre (0.40 ha)
- NRHP reference No.: 74000267
- Added to NRHP: October 1, 1974

The Upper Cox Brook Covered Bridge is a wooden covered bridge that crosses Cox Brook on Cox Brook Road in Northfield, Vermont. It is one of five surviving 19th-century covered bridges in the town, and one of three on the same road. It was listed on the National Register of Historic Places in 1974.

== Description and history ==
The Upper Cox Brook Covered Bridge stands west of the village of Northfield Falls, crossing Cox Brook, a tributary of the Dog River. It is the westernmost of three covered bridges on Cox Brook Road; the other two are the Northfield Falls Covered Bridge (crossing the river), and the Lower Cox Brook Covered Bridge. The bridge is of Queen post truss design, its two trusses 51.5 feet (15.7 m) in length, and resting on abutments either faced or rebuilt in concrete. The trusses are set at an offset, skewed to form a parallelogram. The bridge is covered by a metal gabled roof, and its exterior is clad in vertical board siding, which extends around to the insides of the portals. The bridge deck consists of steel I-beams supporting wooden planking. The trusses no longer carry the bridge's active load, and only support its superstructure. The siding does not rise all the way to the roof, leaving an open strip between them, and there are long rectangular strip openings on the sides, sheltered by projecting siding.

On August 28, 2011, the Upper Cox Brook bridge appeared to have been severely damaged by flooding caused by Hurricane Irene. A tree was thrust up through the bridge into the roof and the approaching road was washed out. The bridge was closed for a brief time, but reopened within 2 weeks after the storm apparently suffering only minor damage.

== See also ==
- List of covered bridges in Vermont
- National Register of Historic Places listings in Washington County, Vermont
- List of bridges on the National Register of Historic Places in Vermont
