= Lower Cox Brook Covered Bridge =

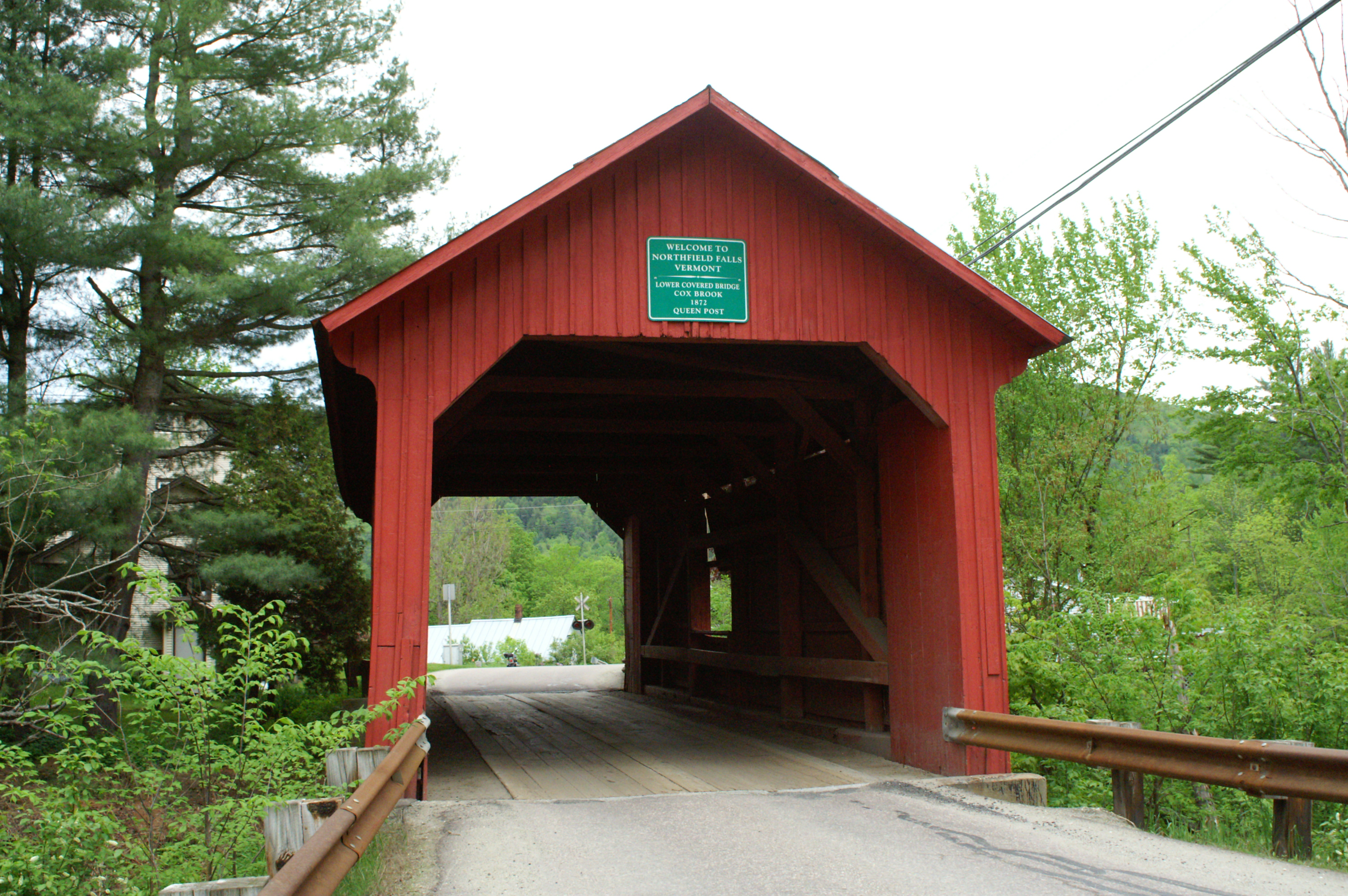
- Bridge in U.S. state of Vermont
- Coordinates: 44°10′23″N 72°39′11″W
- Carries: Automobile
- Crosses: Cox Brook
- Locale: Northfield, Vermont
- Maintained by: Town of Northfield
- ID number: VT-12-10

Characteristics
- Design: Covered, Queen post
- Material: Wood
- Total length: 56.75 ft (17.30 m)
- Width: 15.5 ft (4.72 m)
- No. of spans: 1
- Clearance above: 12 ft (3.66 m)

History
- Constructed by: unknown
- Construction end: 1872
- Lower Cox Brook Covered Bridge
- U.S. National Register of Historic Places
- Location within Vermont Location within the United States
- Coordinates: 44°10′22″N 72°39′09″W
- Area: 1 acre (0.4 ha)
- NRHP reference No.: 74000262
- Added to NRHP: October 15, 1974

The Lower Cox Brook Covered Bridge is a wooden covered bridge that crosses Cox Brook in Northfield, Vermont on Cox Brook Road. Built in 1872, it is one of five surviving 19th-century covered bridges in the town, in the only place in Vermont where two historic bridges are visible from each other. It was listed on the National Register of Historic Places in 1974.

== Description and history ==
The Lower Cox Brook Covered Bridge is one of three 19th-century covered bridges that carry Cox Brook Road within a span of 0.25 miles (0.40 km) near the village of Northfield Falls. The three Northfield bridges stand within a quarter mile of one another. The Northfield Falls Covered Bridge, from which this bridge is visible, spans the Dog River near the mouth of Cox Brook, while this bridge and the Upper Cox Brook Covered Bridge both span Cox Brook. the Slaughterhouse Bridge stand slightly below the three bridge. This bridge is a Queen post truss design, 56.5 feet (17.2 m) long and 18.5 feet (5.6 m) wide, with a roadway width of 15.5 feet (4.7 m) (one lane). It is covered by a metal roof, and its exterior is clad in vertical board and batten siding painted red. The siding extends a short way into each portal. The bridge rests on abutments that are either stone faced in concrete, or have been completely rebuilt in concrete. The wooden bridge deck is supported by four steel I-beams; the trusses now carry only the bridge's superstructure.

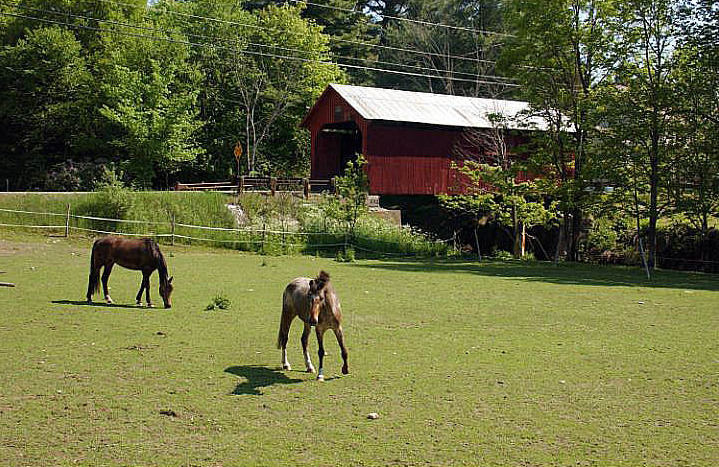
Another view

This locality is the only place in Vermont where one can see a historic covered bridge over one stream from another one over a different stream. There are two covered bridges located in succession over channels of the Ottauquechee River in North Hartland, Vermont: one of those, the Willard Covered Bridge is a 19th-century bridge, while the other is a modern construction.

This bridge was built about 1872; its builder is unknown. Its bridge deck supports were replaced by I-beams in the 1960s.

== See also ==
- List of covered bridges in Vermont
- National Register of Historic Places listings in Washington County, Vermont
- List of bridges on the National Register of Historic Places in Vermont
