= Northfields =

Northfields may refer to:

- Northfields, Leicester
- Northfields, London
  - Northfields Allotments

== See also ==
- Northfield (disambiguation)
