= North Field =

North Field can refer to:

- North Field (Tinian) on Tinian from which the aircraft were launched to drop the atomic bombs on Japan during World War II
- North Field (Iwo Jima) or Iwo Jima Air Base, a World War II airfield on Iwo Jima in the Bonin Islands and still in operation today
- South Pars / North Dome Gas-Condensate field, a gas reserve beneath the Persian Gulf
- The name of Andersen Air Force Base, Guam during the Second World War

== See also ==
- Northfield (disambiguation)
