= Martin's Mill Covered Bridge (Hartland, Vermont) =

- U.S. National Register of Historic Places
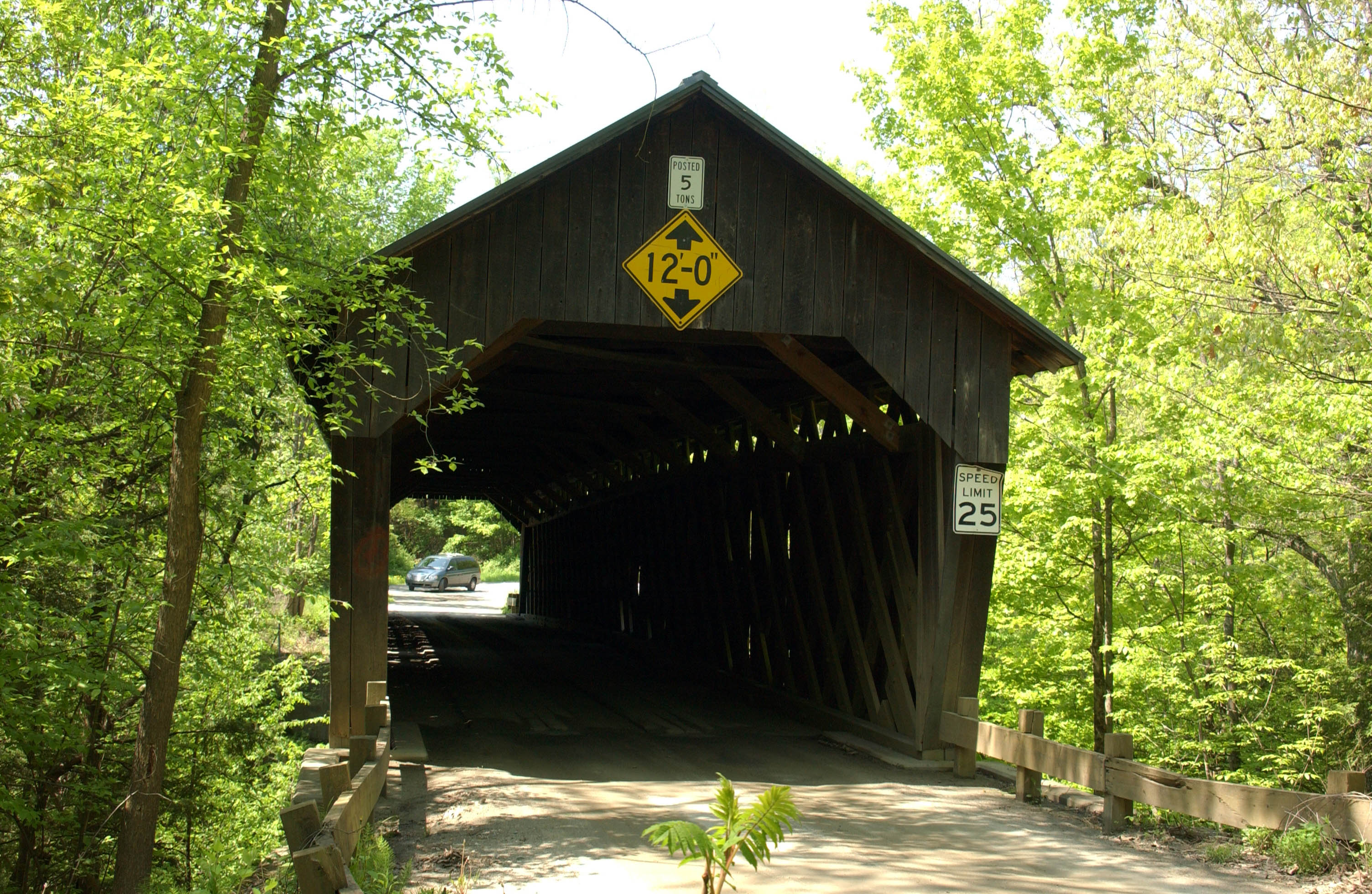

- Location within Vermont
- Location: Martinsville Rd., Hartland, Vermont
- Coordinates: 43°31′56″N 72°23′47″W
- Area: 1 acre (0.40 ha)
- Built: 1880
- Built by: Tasker, James F.
- Architectural style: Town lattice truss
- NRHP reference No.: 73000213
- Added to NRHP: August 28, 1973

The Martin's Mill Covered Bridge is a wooden covered bridge spanning Lull's Brook on Martinsville Road in Hartland, Vermont. Built about 1880, it is one of two surviving 19th-century covered bridges in the town. It was listed on the National Register of Historic Places in 1973.

== Description and history ==
The Martin's Mill Covered Bridge is located about 0.6 miles (0.97 km) east of United States Route 5 on Martinsville Road in a rural wooded area of southern Hartland, with the highway bridges of Interstate 91 rising just to its east. The bridge is a single span Town lattice truss, resting on concrete abutments. It is 136 feet (41 m) long, with portals overhanging the ends by 4 feet (1.2 m). Its total width is 19.5 feet (5.9 m), with a roadway width of 16.5 feet (5.0 m) (one lane). The exterior of the bridge is clad in vertical board siding, which wraps around for a short distance on the insides of the portals. The roof is metal.

The bridge was built about 1880 by James Tasker, who covered bridge historian R.S. Allen describes as one of the most prolific bridgewrights in Windsor County. Tasker most often built bridges that were a modified version of a kingspost truss; this bridge is the more common Town lattice style. It is, along with the Willard Covered Bridge, one of two surviving 19th-century covered bridges in Hartland.

== See also ==
- National Register of Historic Places listings in Windsor County, Vermont
- List of Vermont covered bridges
- List of bridges on the National Register of Historic Places in Vermont
