= Prospect Hill School =

- U.S. National Register of Historic Places
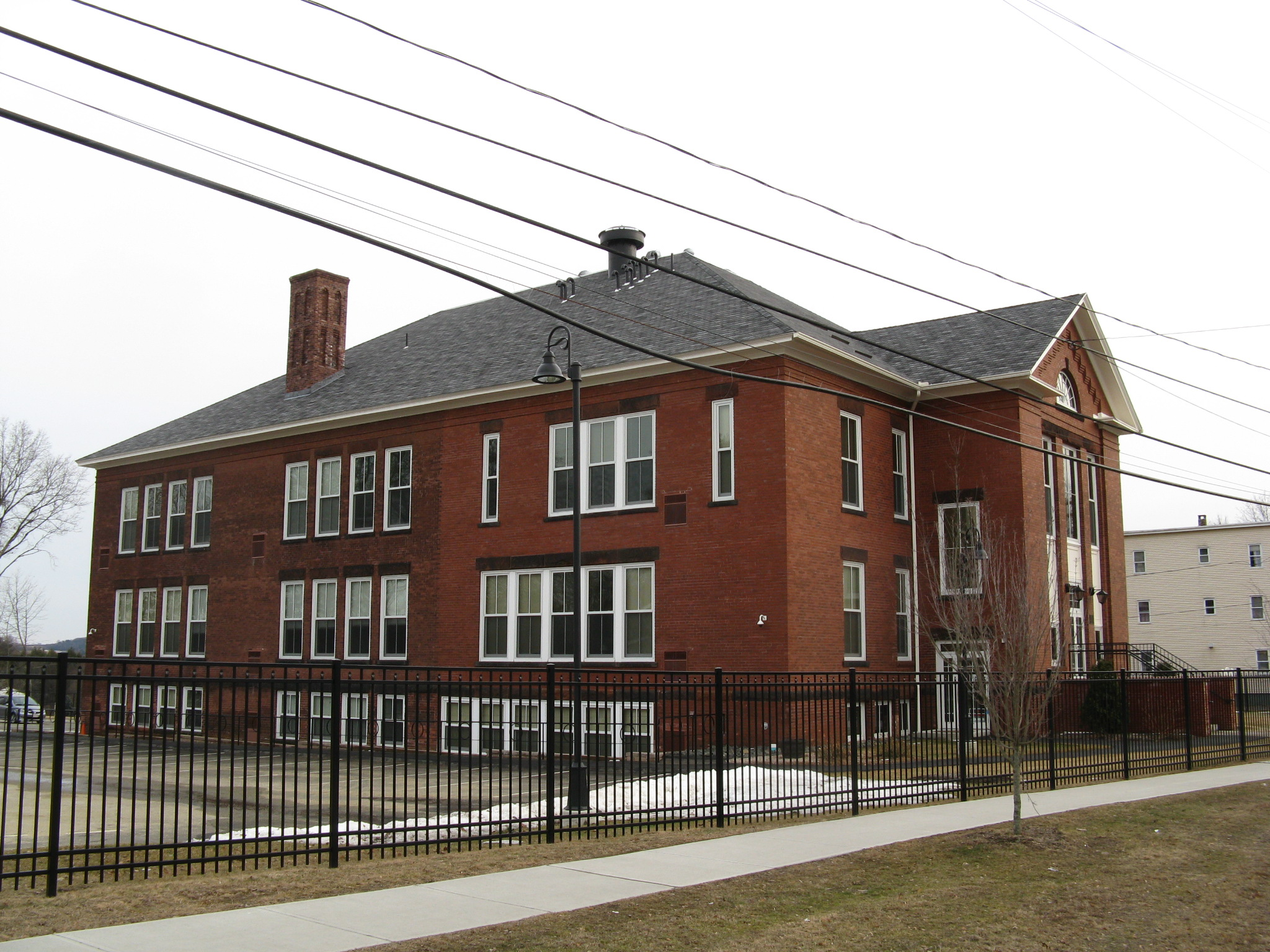

- Location within Massachusetts Location within the United States
- Location: Westfield, Massachusetts
- Coordinates: 42°8′3″N 72°44′46″W
- Built: 1897
- Architect: Augustus W. Holton; Malcolm B. Harding
- Architectural style: Colonial Revival
- NRHP reference No.: 08001069
- Added to NRHP: November 19, 2008

The Prospect Hill School is a historic school building located on 33 Montgomery Street in Westfield, Massachusetts. The Colonial Revival school was built in 1897 to a design by Augustus W. Holton. The school was built on the site of an earlier wood-frame school which was no longer adequate to support the school district's growing student population. It is made of red brick with white sandstone detailing. The hip roof was originally slate, but is now asphalt shingles. The school when it opened had eight schoolrooms and served 300 students. It represented the beginning of a change in the Westfield schools from wood-frame schoolhouses to modern buildings.

With the town's student population growing, the school was expanded in 1919. The expansion retained the Colonial Revival style of the building, even though it gave it a completely new facade. Designed by Malcolm B. Harding, the addition included two more schoolrooms and an auditorium. The school continued to serve the town until 1991, when, after a wave of construction of new schools, the Prospect Hill School was declared obsolete and closed.

The property then lay vacant and unused for fifteen years, despite numerous proposals for its use. The town finally accepted a proposal in 2005 to convert the school into an affordable housing complex. The school was listed on the National Register of Historic Places in 2008.

== See also ==
- National Register of Historic Places listings in Hampden County, Massachusetts
