= Augustus W. Holton =

American architect

- Born: 1850; Northfield, Massachusetts
- Died: 1911 (aged 60–61); Westfield, Massachusetts
- Occupation: Architect

Augustus W. Holton (1850–1911) was an American architect from Westfield, Massachusetts.

Augustus Holton's father was a farmer and a carpenter, and thus Holton was apprenticed to carpenter Jonathan Turner of Keene at the age of 17. Circa 1870 he went south to Springfield, and west to Westfield in 1872. There, he worked for C. K. Lambson (carpentry), W. A. Johnson (organ manufacturing), and T. J. Green (masonry). He established himself as an architect in the early 1890s. He practiced alone for his entire career, until his death in 1911.

Holton was also heavily involved in town and commercial affairs.

At least two of Holton's works have been individually listed on the National Register of Historic Places, and several others contribute to listed historic districts.

== Architectural works ==
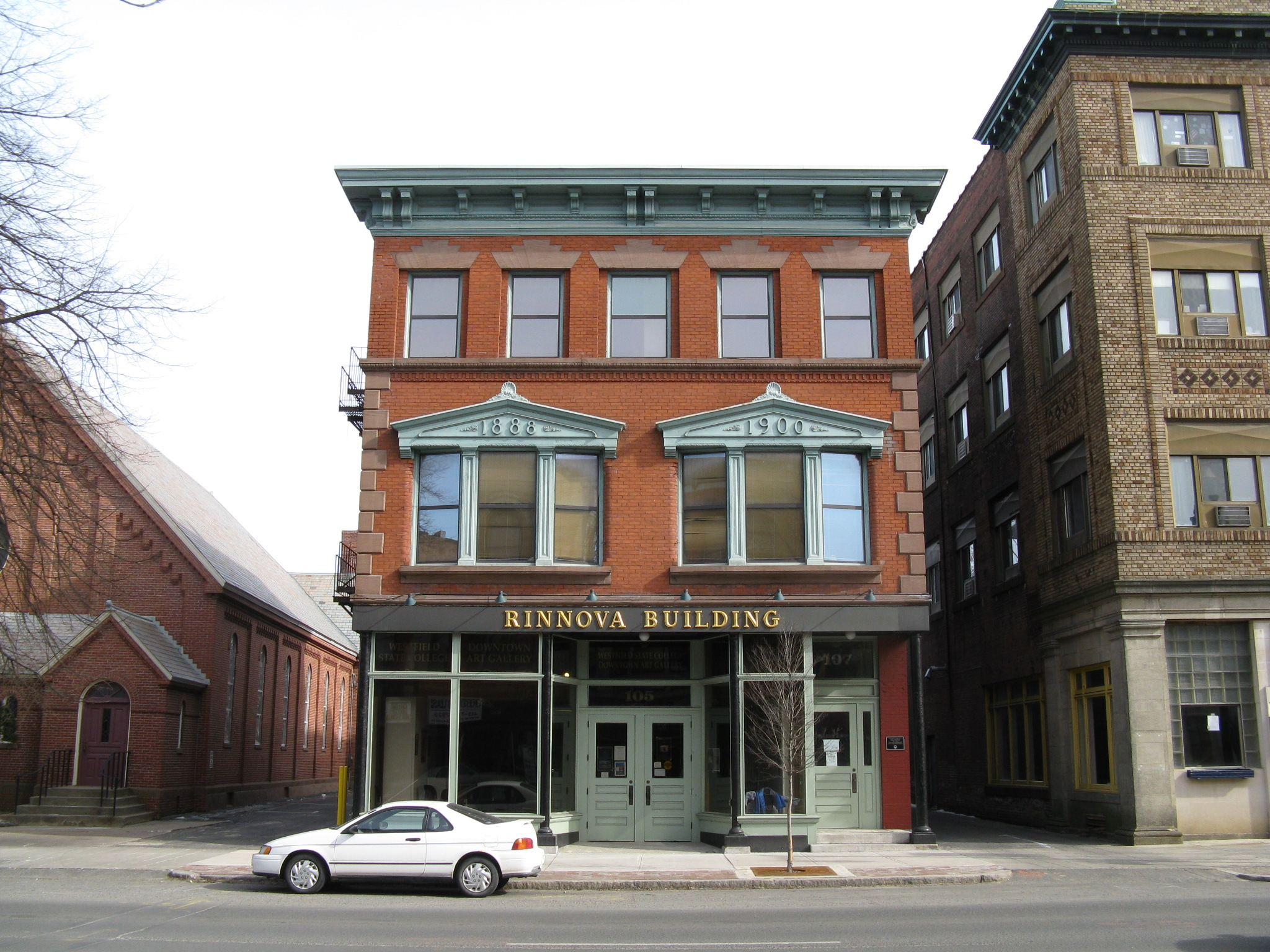
Y. M. C. A. Building, Westfield, 1900.

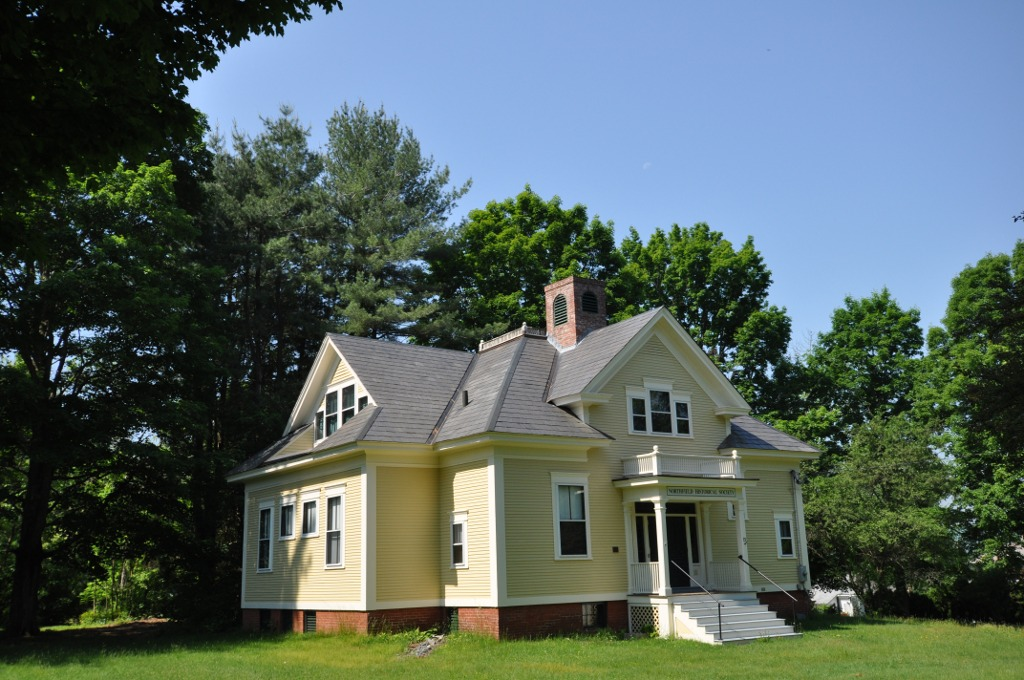
Pine Street School, Northfield, 1903.

- 1892 - Southwick Public Library (Old), 475 College Hwy, Southwick, Massachusetts
- 1896 - Gowdy Bros. Building, 16-20 Arnold St, Westfield, Massachusetts
- 1897 - Robert B. Crane Estate (Sunnyside Ranch), 65 Sunnyside Rd, Southwick, Massachusetts
  - Comprising a main house and several barns, now the Ranch Golf Club
- 1897 - Prospect Hill School, 33 Montgomery St, Westfield, Massachusetts
  - Expanded in 1919 by M. B. Harding
- 1898 - Ashley Street School, Ashley & Cross Sts, Westfield, Massachusetts
  - Demolished in 2012
- 1898 - D. L. Gillett Block, 100 Elm St, Westfield, Massachusetts
- 1898 - St. Mary's R. C. School, 35 Bartlett St, Westfield, Massachusetts
- 1899 - Bismarck Hotel, 16 Union Ave, Westfield, Massachusetts
- 1900 - Y. M. C. A. (Rinnova) Building, 105 Elm St, Westfield, Massachusetts
- 1903 - Pine Street School, 13 Pine St, Northfield, Massachusetts
- 1906 - Elwin C. Hills House, 26 College Hwy, Southwick, Massachusetts
- 1909 - Northfield High School (Old), 104 Main St, Northfield, Massachusetts
