= Northfield (CDP), Vermont =

Census-designated place in Vermont, United States

Northfield, Vermont
- Census-designated place
- Location within Vermont Location within the United States
- Coordinates: 44°07′04″N 72°39′28″W
- Country: United States
- State: Vermont
- County: Washington
- Town: Northfield

Area
  - Total: 2.48 sq mi (6.42 km^{2})
  - Land: 2.43 sq mi (6.30 km^{2})
  - Water: 0.046 sq mi (0.12 km^{2})
- Elevation: 791 ft (241 m)

Population (2020)
  - Total: 3,757
- Time zone: UTC-5 (Eastern (EST))
  - Summer (DST): UTC-4 (EDT)
- ZIP Code: 05663
- Area code: 802
- FIPS code: 50-50200
- GNIS feature ID: 2765037

Northfield is the central village and a census-designated place (CDP) in the town of Northfield, Washington County, Vermont, United States. As of the 2020 census, it had a population of 3,757, out of 5,918 in the entire town. The former village of Northfield merged with the surrounding town of Northfield in 2014; the current CDP includes the former village as well as the unincorporated villages of Northfield Center and South Northfield.

== Geography ==
The CDP is in southern Washington County, in the central part of the town of Northfield, in the valley of the Dog River, a north-flowing tributary of the Winooski River. The CDP is bordered to the north by the village of Northfield Falls and extends south as far as South Northfield. Norwich University is in the southern part of the CDP, in Northfield Center.

Vermont Route 12 is Northfield's Main Street, leading north-northeast (downriver) 10 miles (16 km) to Montpelier, the state capital, and south through Brookfield Gulf 17 miles (27 km) to Randolph. Vermont Route 12A leaves Route 12 in Northfield Center and follows a western alternate route 21 miles (34 km) to Randolph.
