= Pine Street School (Northfield, Massachusetts) =

- U.S. National Register of Historic Places
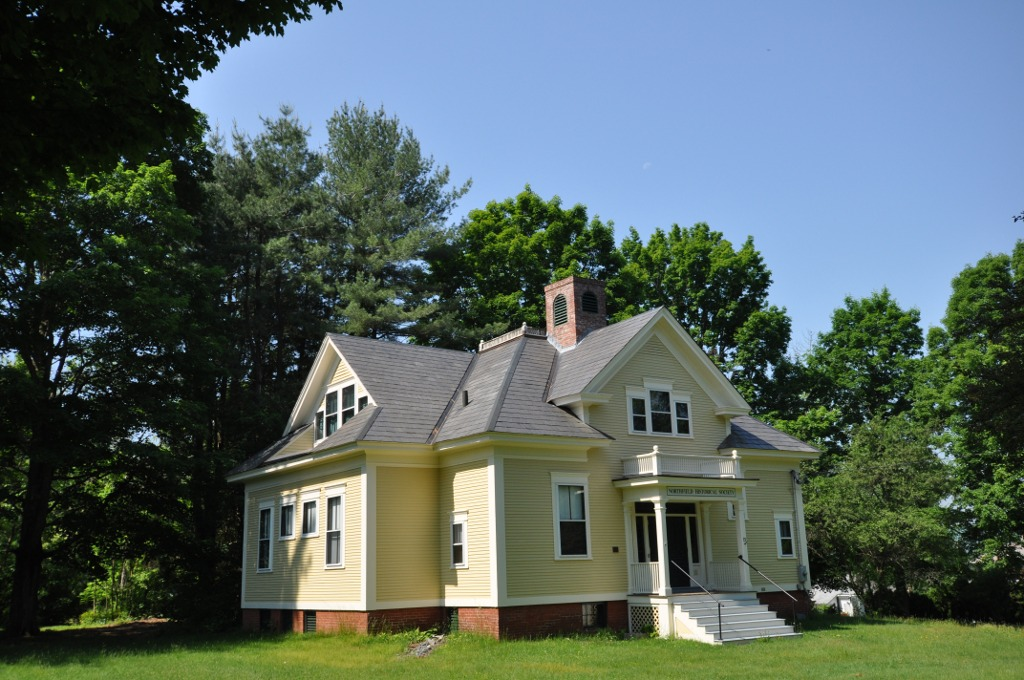

- Location within Massachusetts Location within the United States
- Location: 13 Pine St., Northfield, Massachusetts
- Coordinates: 42°42′32″N 72°26′50″W
- Area: less than one acre
- Architect: Augustus W. Holton
- Architectural style: Colonial Revival
- NRHP reference No.: 02000156
- Added to NRHP: March 13, 2002

The Pine Street School is a historic schoolhouse at 13 Pine Street in Northfield, Massachusetts. The school was built in 1904 and served as such until 1940, and represents a well-preserved specimen of an early 20th-century school building. It was listed on the National Register of Historic Places in 2002.

== Description and history ==
The Pine Street School is located north of the village center of Northfield, on the south side of Pine Street east of Main Street. It is a 1-1/2 story wood frame structure, with a clapboarded exterior and crossed gable-on-hip roof. The central portion of the roof is truncated, with a square section surrounded by a low balustrade, next to the brick chimney. The main entrance is sheltered by a porch with square posts and a plain balustrade above. On the first floor it has a large vestibule, with hanging hooks for student coats. Doors lead into two equally sized classrooms which still have original electrical fixtures, wooden bead-board wainscoting, and plaster walls. Stairs from the vestibule lead up to a third, larger classroom.

The building was designed by Westfield architect Augustus W. Holton in 1903, and was completed in 1904. It was the first of Northfield's schools to have indoor plumbing and central heating. The building was used as a schoolhouse from its construction until 1940, when a fire destroyed the town's Center School. The town then consolidated the elementary grades into a newly built Center School building. The Pine Street school building has served as the town museum since 1943.

== See also ==
- Northfield Main Street Historic District, just outside which the school sits
- National Register of Historic Places listings in Franklin County, Massachusetts
