= Northfield (surname) =

Northfield is a surname. Notable people with the surname include:

- Gary Northfield (born 1969), British cartoonist
- James Northfield (1887–1973), Australian graphic artist
- Paul Northfield, British record producer

== See also ==
- Northfield (disambiguation)
