= Northfield station =

Northfield station may refer to:

- Northfield railway station in Birmingham, England
- Northfield station (Waterloo), a light-rail station in Waterloo, Ontario, Canada
- Northfield railway station, Adelaide, a former station in Adelaide, Australia

== See also ==
- Northfield (disambiguation)
- Northfields tube station, a London Underground station
