= Northfield School =

Northfield School may refer to:

- Northfield Community Schools, school district in Northfield, New Jersey
- Northfield High School, public high school in Northfield, Minnesota
- Northfield Junior-Senior High School, secondary school in Wabash, Indiana
- Northfield Mount Hermon School (Gil, Massachusetts)
- Northfield School (Kohima, Nagaland, India)
- Northfield Public Schools, school district in Northfield, Minnesota
- Northfield School & Sports College (Billingham, England)
- Northfield School of the Liberal Arts (Wichita, Kansas)
- PAREF Northfield School (Quezon City, Philippines)
- Arcadia Charter School (Northfield, Minnesota), previously known as Northfield School of Arts and Technology

== See also ==
- Northfield Academy (Aberdeen, Scotland)
