= Northfields Allotments =

Urban smallholdings

Northfield Allotments
- The northern end of the allotments is overlooked by St John's Church.
- Interactive map of Northfield Allotments
- Type: allotment
- Location: West Ealing
- Coordinates: 51°30′23″N 0°19′06″W
- Area: twenty acres, two roods and sixteen perches
- Created: 1832
- Operator: Ealing Dean Allotment Society
- Website: www.northfieldsallotments.org

Northfield Allotments are allotments in the Northfields district of Ealing. They are the oldest allotments in London, having been created from common land in 1832 as Ealing Dean Common Allotments.

Originally, the allotments covered an area of over twenty acres but this has been reduced by encroachment, with land being used for a public park and housing. The remaining allotments are recognised as an asset of community value and Site of Importance for Nature Conservation.

The site has been managed by plot holders via the Ealing Dean Allotment Society since 2015, on behalf of the charity Pathways.

== History ==
The allotments were created from common land on 7 November 1832, by order of Charles James Blomfield, Bishop of London and lord of the manor of Ealing. The common was Ealing Dean Common, being in Ealing Dean, and was also known as Jackass Common, after the donkey and pony races held there in the summer. The size of this area of land was twenty acres, two roods and sixteen perches. The allotments were to be no more than one rood (0.25 acres) in size, and to be cultivated by poor parishioners. As well as providing poor relief, the bishop's aim was to encourage gardening, which he favoured as a pastime. In 2017, there were 141 plotholders.

== Encroachment ==
The allotments have been subject to encroachment over the years as the land on the western side of Northfields Avenue was taken for housing and a formal park – Dean Court and Dean Gardens. That compulsory purchase took about 60 per cent of the original area. The remaining allotments are now recognised as an asset of community value by the borough council. They are also designated as a Site of Importance for Nature Conservation as they are surrounded by a hedgerow which is about 1,000 yards (910 m) long and provides a habitat for wild life such as hedgehogs and stag beetles. In 2017, they were threatened with further development, as the current landlord – the almshouse charity, Pathways – planned to build more housing upon the land. This provoked a campaign to save them which was backed by Professor Jeremy Burchadt, an authority on allotments, who declared that they were almost certainly the oldest in London. Others backing the campaign include the local MP, Rupa Huq, and thousands of petitioners.

== Gallery ==
Panorama of the allotments viewed from the Model Cottages which were built at the SE corner in 1869
