= Northfield Falls, Vermont =

- Village
- Location within Vermont
- Coordinates: 44°10′19″N 72°39′03″W
- Country: United States
- State: Vermont
- County: Washington
- Elevation: 666 ft (203 m)
- Time zone: UTC-5 (Eastern (EST))
  - Summer (DST): UTC-4 (EDT)
- ZIP code: 05664
- Area code: 802
- GNIS feature ID: 1458779

Northfield Falls is an unincorporated village in the town of Northfield, Washington County, Vermont, United States. The community is located along Vermont Route 12, 1.5 miles (2.4 km) north of the village of Northfield and 7.1 miles (11.4 km) south-southwest of Montpelier. Northfield Falls has a post office with ZIP code 05664.
