= Northfield Township =

Northfield Township may refer to:

- Northfield Township, Cook County, Illinois
- Northfield Township, Michigan
- Northfield Township, Rice County, Minnesota
- Northfield Township, Ramsey County, North Dakota, in Ramsey County, North Dakota
