= Northfield Center Cemetery =

Historic cemetery in Massachusetts, United States

- U.S. National Register of Historic Places
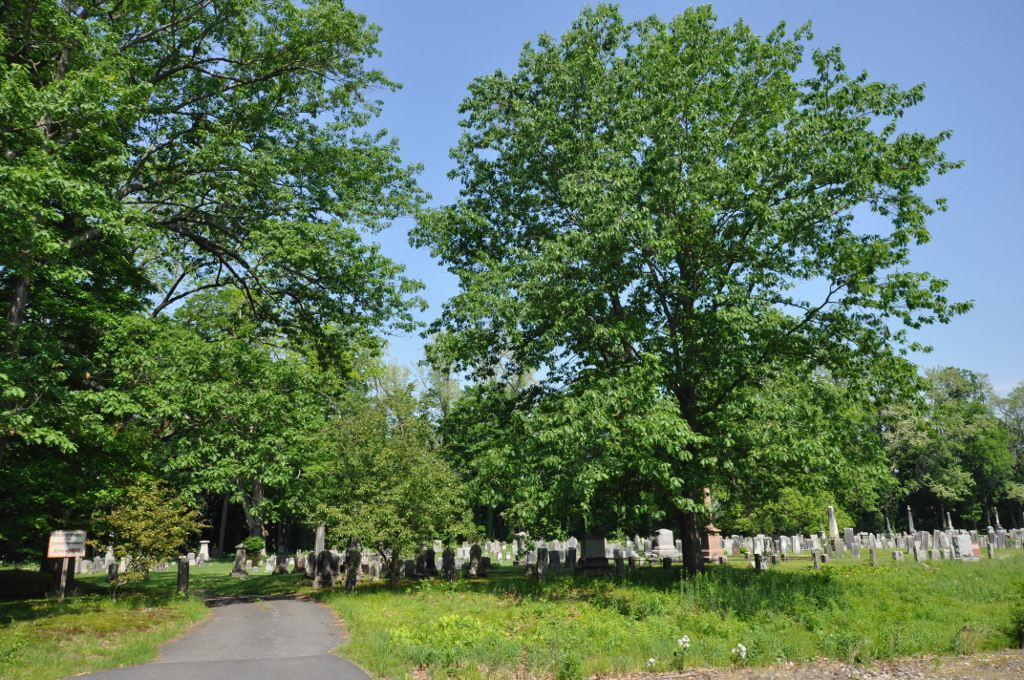

- Location within Massachusetts Location within the United States
- Location: Parker Ave., Northfield, Massachusetts
- Coordinates: 42°41′41″N 72°27′40″W
- Area: 7.64 acres (3.09 ha)
- NRHP reference No.: 04001220
- Added to NRHP: November 13, 2004

The Northfield Center Cemetery is a historic cemetery located at the western terminus of Parker Avenue in Northfield, Massachusetts. Established in 1686, it is the town's first burying ground, with documented graves dating to 1714. It was listed on the National Register of Historic Places in 2004.

== Description and history ==
The Northfield Center Cemetery is located a short way west of the town center, at the western end of Parker Avenue. It is bounded on the east by a railroad right of way, and on the west by a wooded embankment leading down to the flood plain of the Connecticut River. It is 7.64-acre (3.09 ha) in size, and consists of roughly level ground, fringed with trees on the three sides not abutting the railroad tracks. The main entrance is at the southeast corner, and a narrow paved road provides a roughly oval circulation pattern through the grounds.

The cemetery was established in 1686, and is Northfield's first burying ground. Northfield was abandoned twice, because of King Philip's War in the 1670s and King William's War in the 1690s, and was not permanently resettled until 1714. The gravesite of Zechariah Field, one of the 1714 settlers, has been identified in the graveyard. The cemetery continues in active use today, with more than 1,000 burial sites. The section with the oldest graves is near the center, and features stones of slate and schist, many adorned with winged skulls. One of the most elegant markers is that of the Allen family, consisting of a marble column 15 feet (4.6 m) in height, entwined with carved vines and topped by an urn.

== See also ==
- Northfield Main Street Historic District
- National Register of Historic Places listings in Franklin County, Massachusetts
