= Willard Covered Bridge =

- U.S. National Register of Historic Places
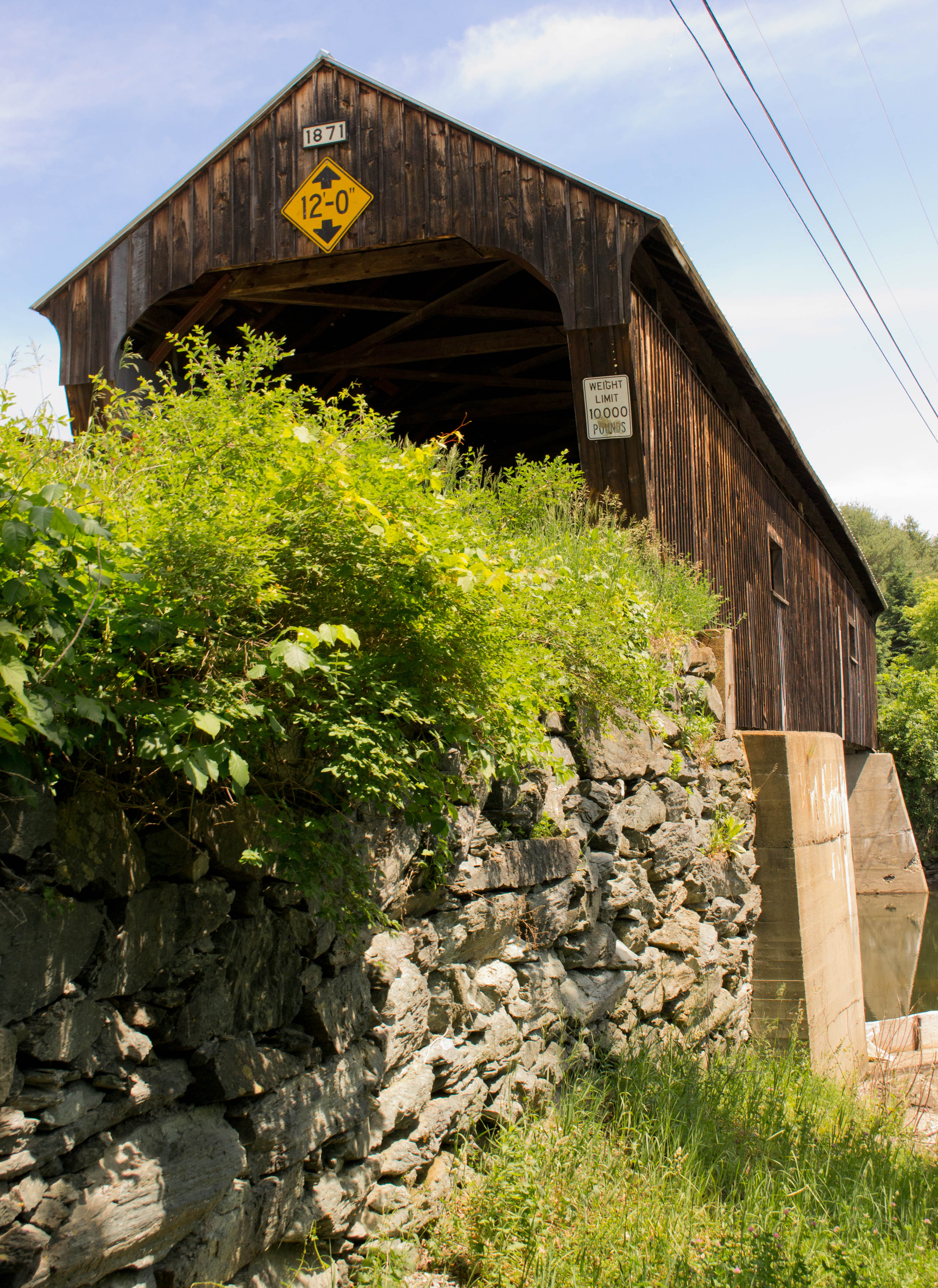

- Location within Vermont Location within the United States
- Location: Mill Rd. across the Ottauquechee River, Hartland, Vermont
- Coordinates: 43.5938234°N 72.3493333°W
- Area: 1 acre (0.40 ha)
- Architectural style: Town lattice truss
- NRHP reference No.: 73000216
- Added to NRHP: August 28, 1973

The Willard Covered Bridge is a historic covered bridge carrying Mill Street across the Ottauquechee River in Hartland, Vermont. It is the eastern of two covered bridges on the road, which are connected via a small island in the river; the western bridge was built in 2001. This bridge, built about 1870, was listed on the National Register of Historic Places in 1973.

== Description and history ==
The Willard Covered Bridge is located in the village of North Hartland, where Mill Street runs roughly eastward, crossing the Ottauquechee River to provide access to a few homes and businesses. The road crosses the river at a point south of Interstate 91 (I-91) where it is briefly bisected by a small island. The western of the bridges carrying the road is a modern covered bridge, while the Willard Bridge is to the east. It is a single-span Town lattice truss 123 feet (37 m) in length, resting on stone abutments faced in concrete. It is 21 feet (6.4 m) wide, with a roadway width of 16.5 feet (5.0 m) (one lane). The gable ends project beyond the trusses, and the roof is a standing seam metal roof. The bridge sides and portals are sheathed in vertical board siding; there are two square openings cut into each side.

The bridge was built about 1870; it is one of two surviving 19th-century covered bridges in Hartland. (The other is the Martin's Mill Covered Bridge, also listed on the National Register.)

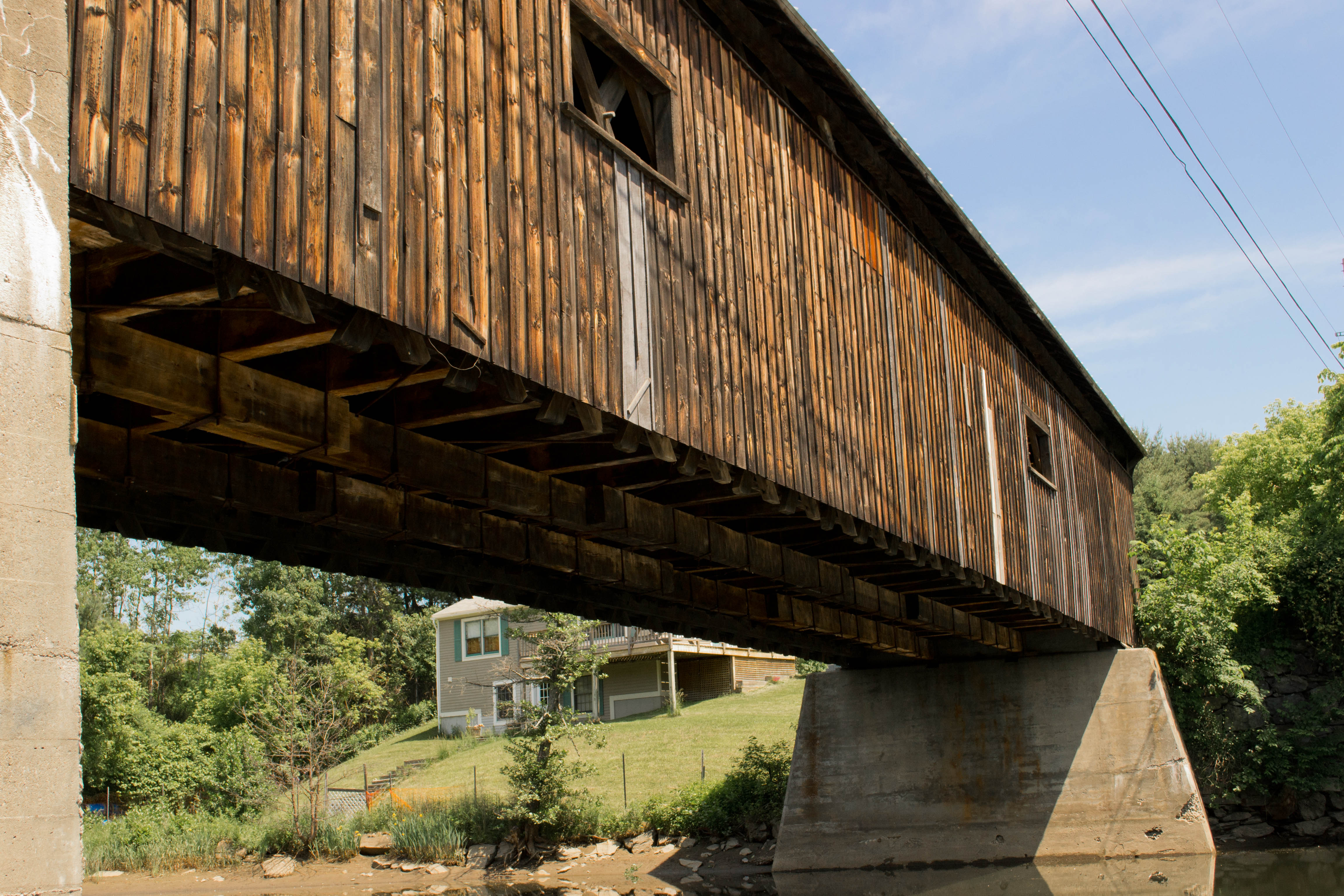

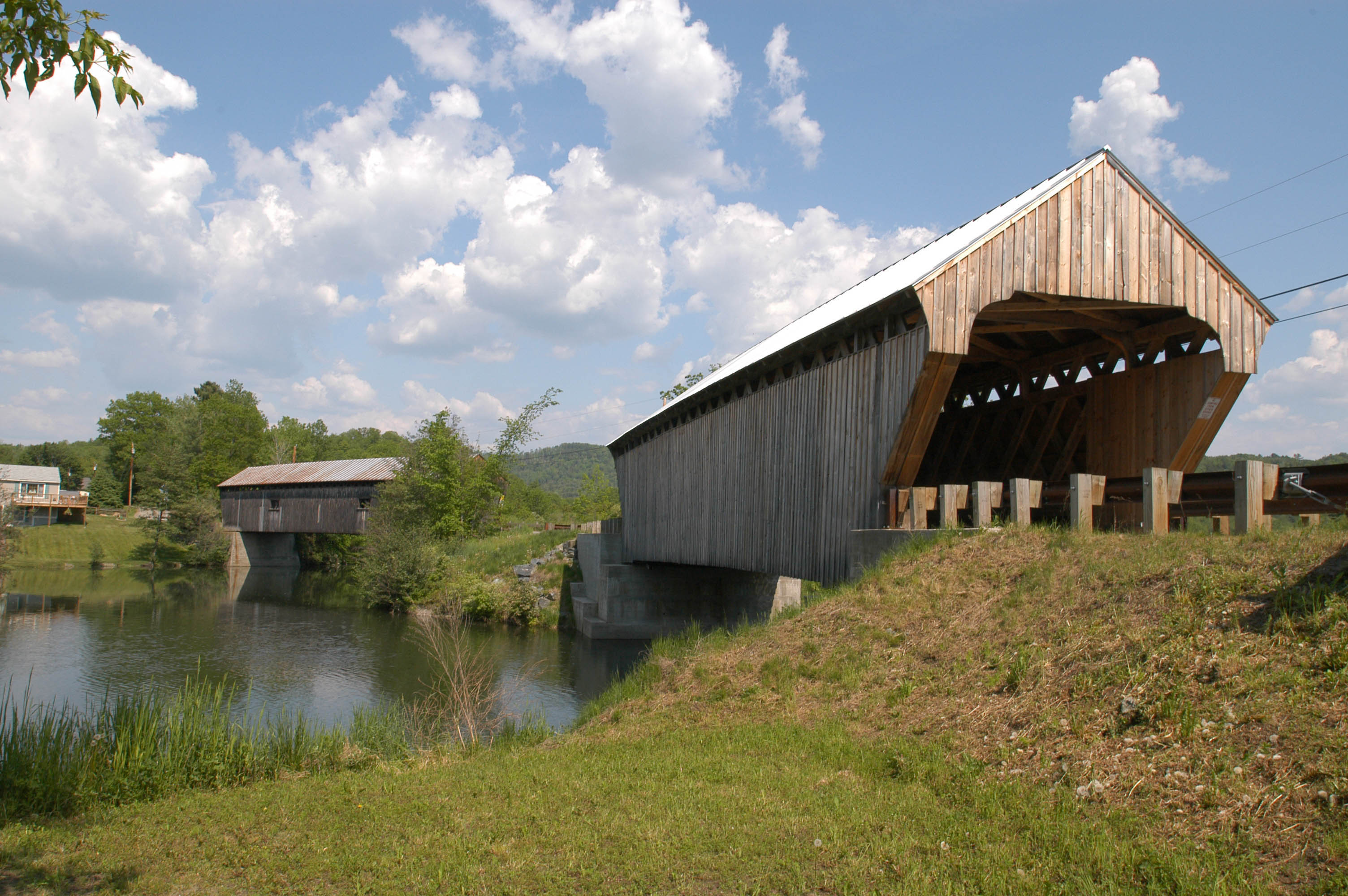
The Willard Covered Bridge is on the left in this photo.

== See also ==
- National Register of Historic Places listings in Windsor County, Vermont
- List of Vermont covered bridges
- List of bridges on the National Register of Historic Places in Vermont
