= Northfield Main Street Historic District =

Historic district in Massachusetts, United States

- U.S. National Register of Historic Places
- U.S. Historic district
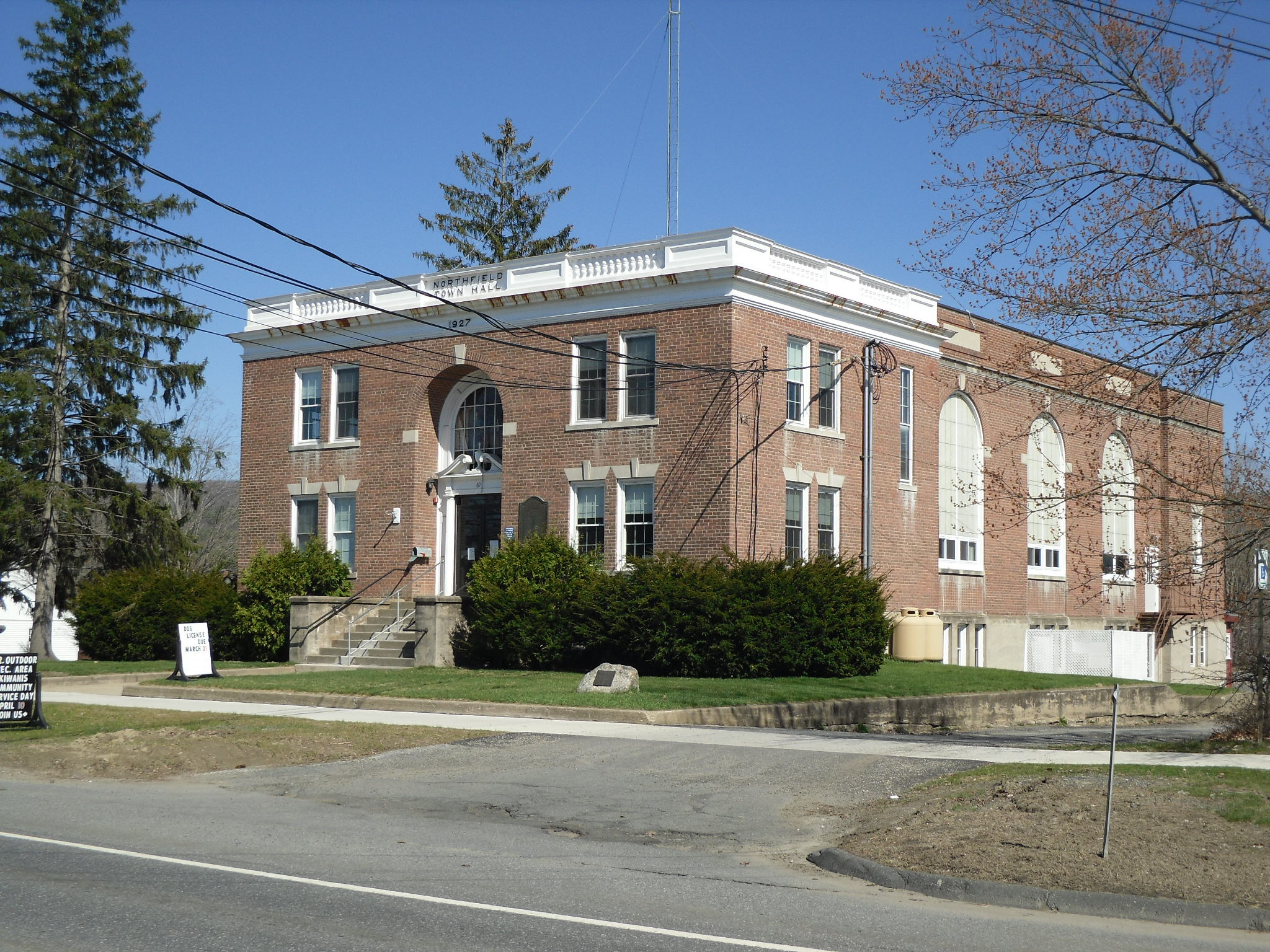
- Northfield town hall

- Location within Massachusetts Location within the United States
- Location: Main St. between Millers Brook and Pachaug Brook, Northfield, Massachusetts
- Coordinates: 42°41′50″N 72°27′16″W
- Area: 350 acres (140 ha)
- Architect: Multiple
- Architectural style: Early Republic, Greek Revival, Late Victorian
- NRHP reference No.: 82004965
- Added to NRHP: July 8, 1982

The Northfield Main Street Historic District is a historic district located along the full length of Main Street from Millers Brook to Pauchaug Brook in Northfield, Massachusetts. The district encompasses the part of Main Street that was laid out when Northfield was first established in the 17th century. The area has retained many of its traditional lot divisions, and features civic and residential construction from the 18th to the 20th centuries. The district was listed on the National Register of Historic Places in 1982.

== Description and history ==
Northfield, the site of a Native American community prior to English colonization, was settled in 1672, abandoned during King Philip's War (1675–78), briefly resettled, and again abandoned for the duration of King William's War and Queen Anne's War (1690-1713). The community's permanent settlement history begins in 1714, although the site of a fort erected in 1685 near the present town center remained identifiable into the 19th century. Main Street was located on a terrace above fertile farmland in the floodplain of the Connecticut River, and is still the major north-south route on the east side of the river. The community has a largely agrarian history, with Main Street a focal point for business and civic activities, as well as a substantial number of early residences.

The historic portion of Main Street extends from Pachaug Brook in the north to Miller's Brook in the south, a distance of more than 2 miles (3.2 km). The spacing and layout of buildings along this route are the result of the 18th-century layout of the street and its abutting properties, while the architecture is predominantly 19th-century in character. The village has a large number of Federal and Greek Revival houses, mainly due to the influence of Calvin and Samuel Stearns, builders who had worked for Charles Bulfinch in Boston and arrived in the town in 1799. The Stearns family, in addition to building a substantial number of houses, also trained a generation of builders in these styles, resulting in their widespread use in the region.

== See also ==
- Pine Street School (Northfield, Massachusetts)
- Northfield Center Cemetery
- National Register of Historic Places listings in Franklin County, Massachusetts
