= Northfield, Aberdeen =

Area of Aberdeen, Scotland

Coordinates: 57.1648°N 2.1614°W

Northfield: Scottish Gaelic: Achadh a Tuath
- Location within the Aberdeen City council area Location within Scotland
- Population: 5,481 (2015 estimate)
- OS grid reference: NJ903082
- Council area: Aberdeen City
- Lieutenancy area: Aberdeen
- Country: Scotland
- Sovereign state: United Kingdom
- Post town: ABERDEEN
- Postcode district: AB16
- Dialling code: 01224
- Police: Scotland
- Fire: Scottish
- Ambulance: Scottish
- UK Parliament: Aberdeen North
- Scottish Parliament: Aberdeen Donside

Northfield is an area of Aberdeen, Scotland.

It has a community council, swimming pool, medical practice and a police office. The Aberdeen Treasure Hub art gallery in the area was opened in November 2016.

== Education ==
There are four primary schools: Westpark School, Bramble Brae School, Heathryburn School and Manor Park School. Secondary age pupils go to Northfield Academy.

== Swimming pool ==
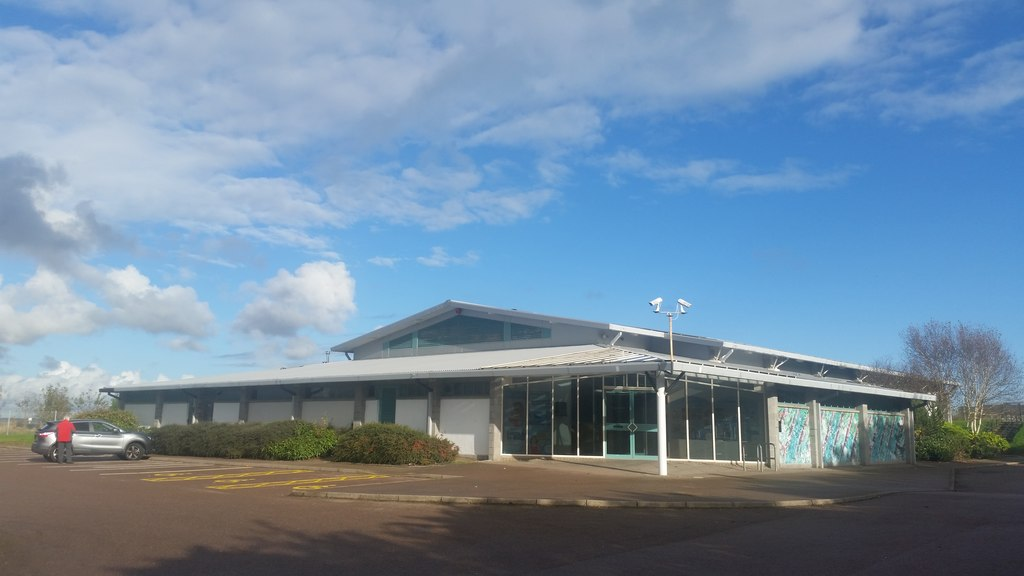
Northfield swimming pool

Northfield Swimming Pool is a council-owned facility with a 25-metre pool. It was opened in 1996. It closed in March 2018 due to an equipment failure. Later that year, the council announced that the pool would be refurbished and expanded, and would reopen in summer 2021. However, due to the COVID-19 pandemic, the reopening was postponed to summer 2022.

In early 2024, the pool was temporarily closed due to a young girl dying, as a result of getting into difficulty in the water.
