= Northfield (village), Vermont =

Northfield, Vermont
- Former Village
- Location in Washington County and the state of Vermont

- Location in the United States
- Coordinates: 44°9′4″N 72°39′27″W
- Country: United States
- State: Vermont
- County: Washington

Area
  - Total: 1.4 sq mi (3.6 km^{2})
  - Land: 1.4 sq mi (3.5 km^{2})
  - Water: 0.039 sq mi (0.1 km^{2})
- Elevation: 732 ft (223 m)

Population (2020)
  - Total: 3,757
  - Density: 2,800/sq mi (1,100/km^{2})
- Time zone: UTC-5 (Eastern (EST))
  - Summer (DST): UTC-4 (EDT)
- ZIP code: 05663
- Area code: 802
- FIPS code: 50-50200
- GNIS feature ID: 1461817

Northfield is a former village in the town of Northfield in Washington County, Vermont, United States. The population was 3,757 at the 2020 census. In 2014, the village and surrounding town of Northfield merged to form a single municipal government; the village and its neighbors Northfield Center and South Northfield are now included in the Northfield census-designated place for population statistics purposes.

== Geography ==
According to the United States Census Bureau, the village had a total area of 1.4 square miles (3.6 km^{2}), of which 1.4 square miles (3.5 km^{2}) were land and 0.04 square miles (0.1 km^{2}), or 2.38%, were water.

== Demographics ==
Historical population
| Census | Pop. | Note | %± |
|---|---|---|---|
| 1880 | 1,313 | | — |
| 1890 | 1,222 | | −6.9% |
| 1900 | 1,508 | | 23.4% |
| 1910 | 1,918 | | 27.2% |
| 1920 | 1,916 | | −0.1% |
| 1930 | 2,075 | | 8.3% |
| 1940 | 2,129 | | 2.6% |
| 1950 | 2,262 | | 6.2% |
| 1960 | 2,159 | | −4.6% |
| 1970 | 2,139 | | −0.9% |
| 1980 | 2,033 | | −5.0% |
| 1990 | 1,889 | | −7.1% |
| 2000 | 3,208 | | 69.8% |
| 2010 | 2,101 | | −34.5% |
| 2020 | 3,757 | | 78.8% |
U.S. Decennial Census

As of the census of 2000, there were 3,208 people, 811 households, and 486 families residing in the village. The population density was 2,215.5 people per square mile (854.2/km^{2}). There were 857 housing units at an average density of 591.9/sq mi (228.2/km^{2}). The racial makeup of the village was 93.39% White, 1.78% Black or African American, 0.34% Native American, 1.93% Asian, 0.69% from other races, and 1.87% from two or more races. Hispanic or Latino of any race were 3.30% of the population.

There were 811 households, out of which 32.4% had children under the age of 18 living with them, 43.2% were married couples living together, 12.5% had a female householder with no husband present, and 40.0% were non-families. 29.6% of all households were made up of individuals, and 12.6% had someone living alone who was 65 years of age or older. The average household size was 2.34 and the average family size was 2.92.

In the village, the population was spread out, with 15.0% under the age of 18, 43.5% from 18 to 24, 17.5% from 25 to 44, 12.2% from 45 to 64, and 11.8% who were 65 years of age or older. The median age was 22 years. For every 100 females, there were 142.1 males. For every 100 females age 18 and over, there were 144.5 males.

The median income for a household in the village was $33,348, and the median income for a family was $39,783. Males had a median income of $31,250 versus $22,955 for females. The per capita income for the village was $11,760. About 6.5% of families and 12.1% of the population were below the poverty line, including 10.1% of those under age 18 and 10.0% of those age 65 or over.
