= Northfield News =

Vermont newspaper (1878-)

- Type: Weekly Newspaper
- Format: Broadsheet
- Owner(s): Northfield News Publishing, LLC
- Editor: John W. Cruickshank
- Founded: 1878
- Headquarters: Northfield, Vermont
- Circulation: 1500
- OCLC number: 28901551

The Northfield News is a weekly newspaper in the U.S. state of Vermont. It was started in 1878 by George Richmond and is owned by Northfield News Publishing, LLC. The Northfield News is published weekly on Thursdays and serves Northfield and surrounding communities in Washington County, Vermont. According to the American Newspapers Representative database, the Northfield News has a weekly paid circulation of 1,500 copies.

== History ==
Northfield News was founded in 1878 by George Richmond. Richmond sold the paper to Fred Norris Whitney in 1884.

Fred Norris Whitney was the publisher of Northfield News from 1884 to 1888 and again from 1904 to 1908. Between 1888 and 1904, the paper was owned by E. Gerry & Co. of Randolph and run by Luther B. Johnson. Johnson sold the paper back to Whitney in 1904 and bought the Burlington Clipper. Whitney managed paper and the Northfield Publishing Company from 1904 to 1912, when he died. Mrs. Whitney continued to own and run the paper until 1916, when she sold the paper to Frank T. Parsons.

The Northfield News editor, John Mazuzan, bought the paper in 1932 in a sheriff's sale from the Northfield Trust Company. Mazuzan and co-owner James G. Gilbert changed the named of the paper to News and Advertiser.

Francis Edward Flood owned and operated the paper with his brother from 1973 to 1979. He continued to write and edit historical articles for the paper until the Wednesday before he died, in 1986. Francis and his brother Bernie sold the paper to husband-and-wife team Robert "Bob" Pinto and Debbie Pinto in 1979. At the time, the paper was still being set by hand and printed on a press bought in 1926. The Pintos sold the paper in 1983 to career journalist James L. Wilson and his wife, Ingrid Eriksen-Wilson, In 1984, they purchased a new off-set printer.

The Wilson's announced the paper's immanent closure in 2003, but was instead sold and continued publishing under the ownership of Cecelia "Celia" Barnes, a former Northfield News employee. John Clark Donahue Jr. also made an offer to purchase the paper from the Wilsons at that time, which was rejected.

In January 2007, the Northfield News was bought by John Clark Donahue Jr. who renamed it The Northfield News and Transcript as a successor to both the Northfield News and the defunct Northfield Transcript (1999-2001).

On July 22, 2008, the paper was bought from John Clark Donahue Jr. by John Cruickshank and Woody Phillips, both retired from other occupations. They changed the name from "Northfield News and Transcript" to "Northfield News" shortly thereafter.

On May 25, 2024, Kimberly Lynn Abare, a Northfield native, and her husband David Abare bought the paper.
