= Northfield Falls Covered Bridge =

Bridge in Northfield, Vermont, United States

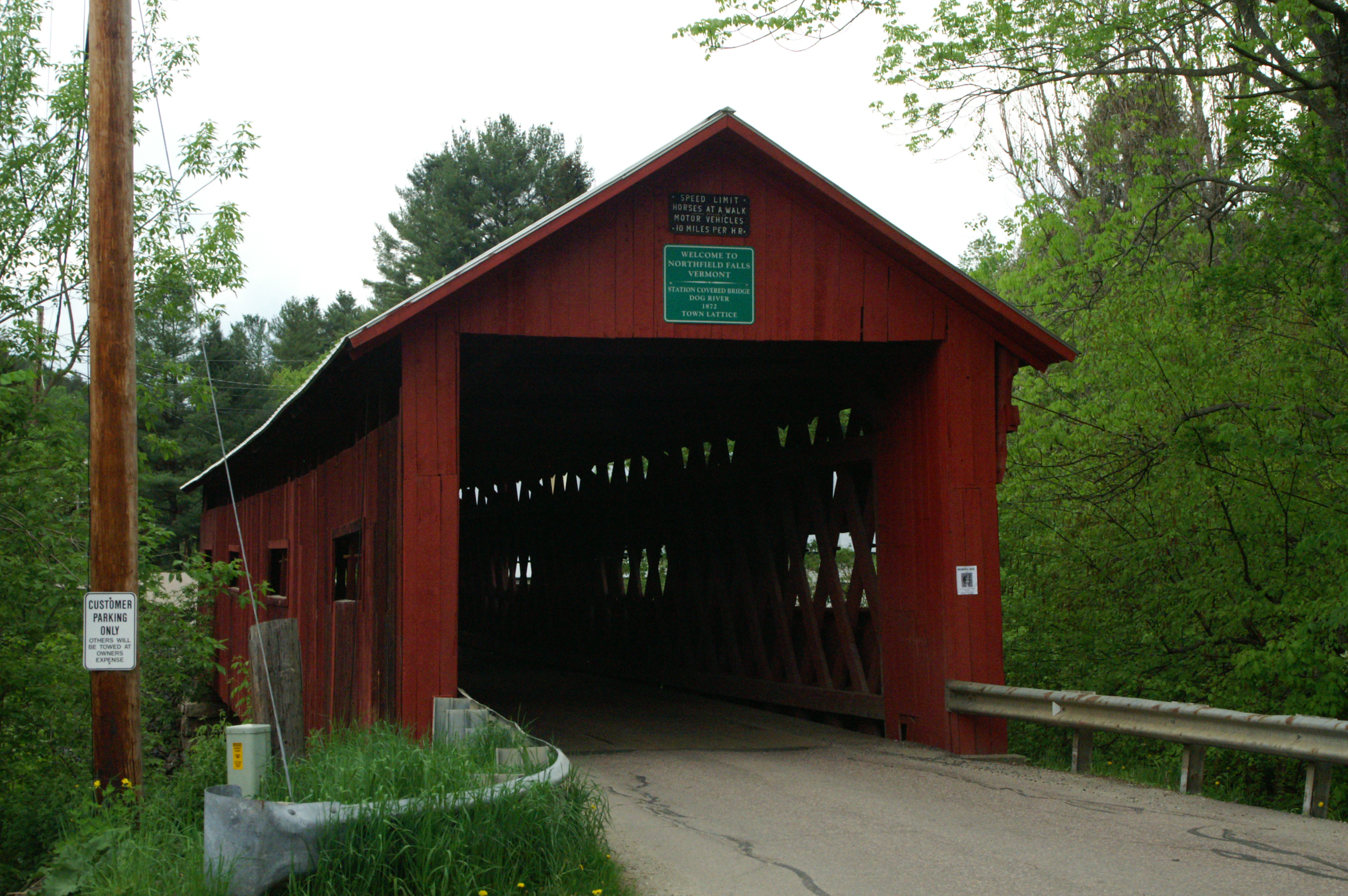
- Bridge in U.S. state of Vermont
- Coordinates: 44°10′23″N 72°39′04″W
- Carries: Cox Brook Road
- Crosses: Dog River
- Locale: Northfield, Vermont
- Maintained by: Town of Northfield
- ID number: VT-12-08

Characteristics
- Design: Covered, town lattice
- Material: Wood
- Total length: 136.75 ft (41.68 m)
- Width: 16.1 ft (4.91 m)
- No. of spans: 1
- Clearance above: 12 ft (3.66 m)

History
- Constructed by: unknown
- Construction end: 1872
- Northfield Falls Covered Bridge
- U.S. National Register of Historic Places
- Location within Vermont Location within the United States
- Coordinates: 44°10′21″N 72°39′04″W
- Area: 1 acre (0.40 ha)
- NRHP reference No.: 74000263
- Added to NRHP: August 13, 1974

The Northfield Falls Covered Bridge, also called the Station Covered Bridge, is a wooden covered bridge that carries Cox Brook Road across the Dog River in Northfield, Vermont. Built in 1872, this Town lattice truss bridge is one of five surviving covered bridges in the town, and one of two that are visible from each other (the other is the Lower Cox Brook Covered Bridge). It was listed on the National Register of Historic Places in 1974.

== Description and history ==
The Northfield Falls Covered Bridge is located in the village of Northfield Falls of northern Northfield, a short way west of Vermont Route 12 on Cox Brook Road. It spans the Dog River in an east–west orientation, and is located just a few hundred feet east of the Lower Cox Brook Covered Bridge, which spans the eponymous brook. It is a single-span Town lattice truss, which has been reinforced by the introduction of a central pier. It is 137 feet (42 m) long and 19.5 feet (5.9 m) wide, with a roadway width of 16 feet (4.9 m) (one lane). It is covered by a metal gabled roof, and its exterior is sheathed in vertical board siding. The siding extends around a short way inside the portals to shelter the ends of the trusses, and extends upward only partway to the roof eave, leaving an open strip between them. The bridge rests on stone abutments faced in concrete.

The bridge was built in 1872; its designed is unknown. It is one of five surviving bridges in the community, three of which are found on Cox Brook Road in the span of 0.25 miles (0.40 km). In 1963 the bridge deck was strengthened by the addition of 4 steel Ɪ-beams underneath, and the unmortared stone abutments were faced with concrete.

== See also ==
- List of covered bridges in Vermont
- National Register of Historic Places listings in Washington County, Vermont
- List of bridges on the National Register of Historic Places in Vermont
