= Northfield Savings Bank =

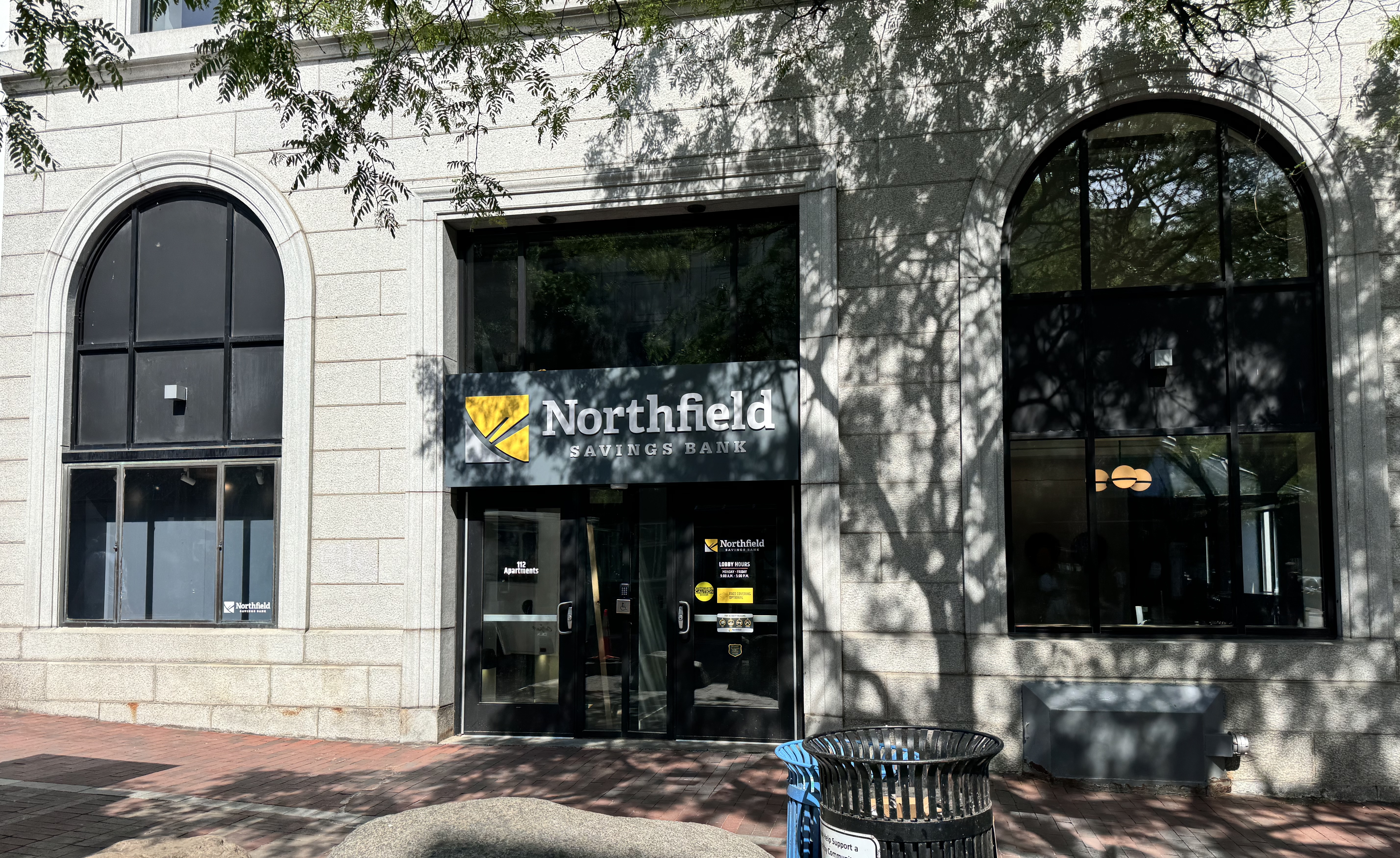
Northfield Savings Bank on Church Street in Burlington, Vermont

Northfield Savings Bank is the largest, Vermont-owned bank chain based in Northfield, Vermont. It was established in 1867 and currently has over a dozen branches across Chittenden and Washington counties, including Burlington, Barre, and Montpelier. The bank donates 10% of its profits to community organizations in Vermont.
