= Northfield Academy =

Northfield academy
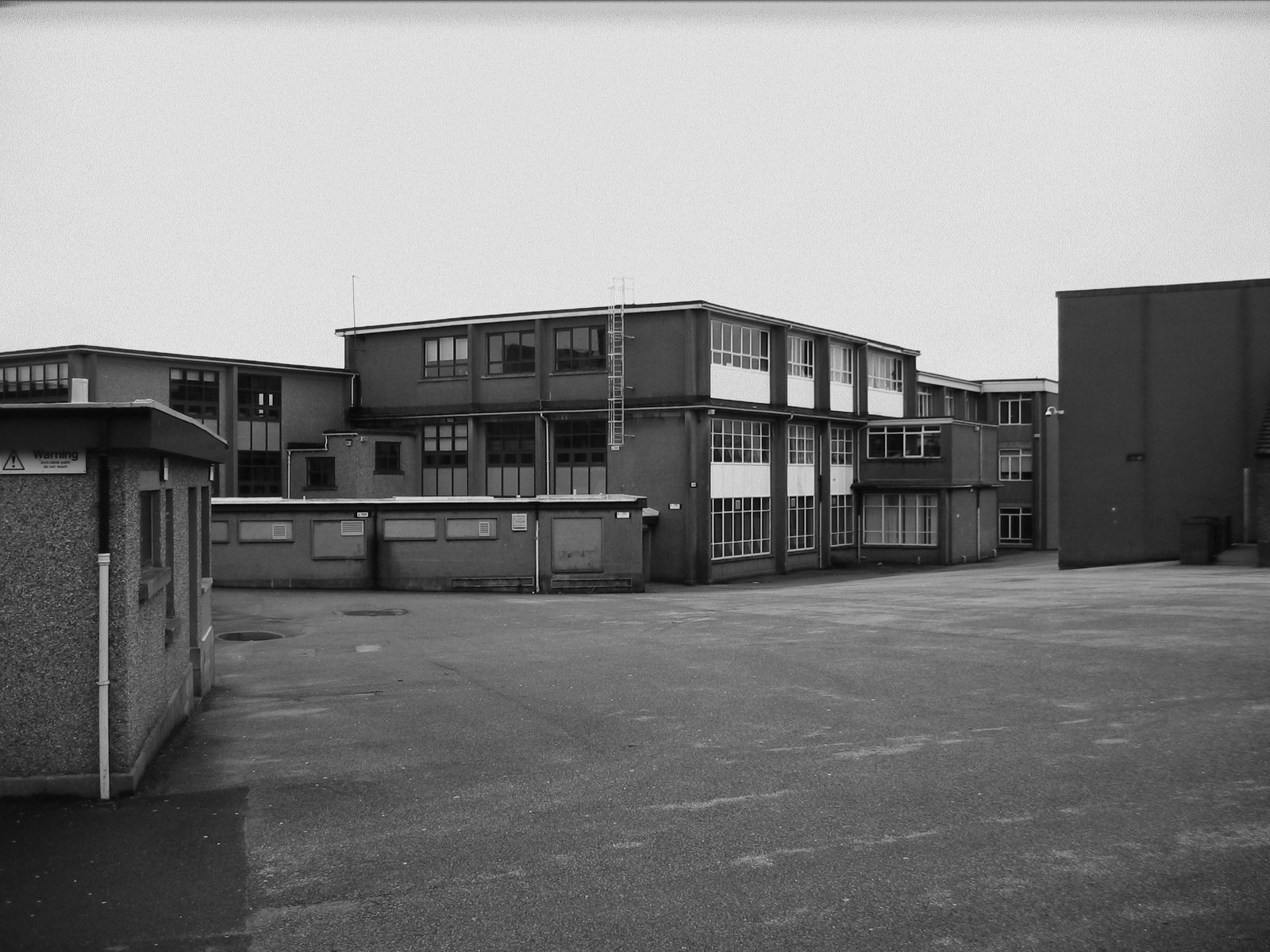
- Northfield Academy, as seen from Cummings Park Circle.

Location
- Granitehill Place; Aberdeen, AB16 7AU; Scotland; 57.1621°N 2.1474°W

Information
- Type: Secondary school
- Motto: “Nurture, Flourish, Achieve”
- Established: 27 August 1956
- Local authority: Aberdeen City Council
- Head teacher: Nehemiah Robinson
- Gender: Co-educational
- Age: 11 to 19
- Enrolment: 800 (approx)
- Houses: Bruce, Dunkeld, Macbeth, Stewart, Wallace
- School years: S1-S6
- Website: https://northfield.aberdeen.sch.uk/

Northfield Academy is a secondary school in Northfield, Aberdeen, which opened in 1956. It serves the Mastrick and Northfield areas of Aberdeen. Local feeder schools are Bramble Brae School, Heathryburn School, Manor Park School, Muirfield School, and Quarryhill School. The current headteacher is Mr McDermott, who took up post in 2023. Northfield Academy has a 3G Astro pitch.

== History ==
The school was opened on 27 April 1956 as Northfield Secondary School. It had a roll of 346 pupils in the first two years and 34 members of staff. The school's first headmaster was James S M Eddison, who was appointed an OBE for his services to education. Due to the school's increasing numbers in the early 1960s, additional hut classrooms were built in the playground and almost all of the neighboring Stockethill Primary School was acquired as an annex. In 1970 the school's name changed from Northfield Secondary School to Northfield Academy.

In December 2015, a £700,000 3G football pitch was officially opened at the school. It can be used for P.E sessions or at lunch time.

In August 2017, the school's Cook in charge Lynn Ellington won the Scottish School Cook of The Year competition.

On 22 March 2021, a large fire broke out at the school. There were no injuries reported.

== Headteachers ==
| Name | Incumbency |
|---|---|
| James S M Eddison OBE | 1956 - 1962 |
| Alistair McKenzie | 1962 - 1973 |
| Ian McDowall | 1973 - 1992 |
| David Eastwood | 1992 - 1996 |
| Tom Robertson | 1996 - 2003 |
| Sue Muncer | 2003 - 2012 |
| Neil Hendry | 2012 - 2017 |
| Gavin Morrison | 2018 – 2020 |
| Douglas Watt | 2020 – 2023 |
| Craig McDermott | Oct 2023 – Present |

== Former Pupils ==
- Rachael Boyle (née Small) (born 1991), Scottish international footballer
