= Northfield, Vermont =

- Town
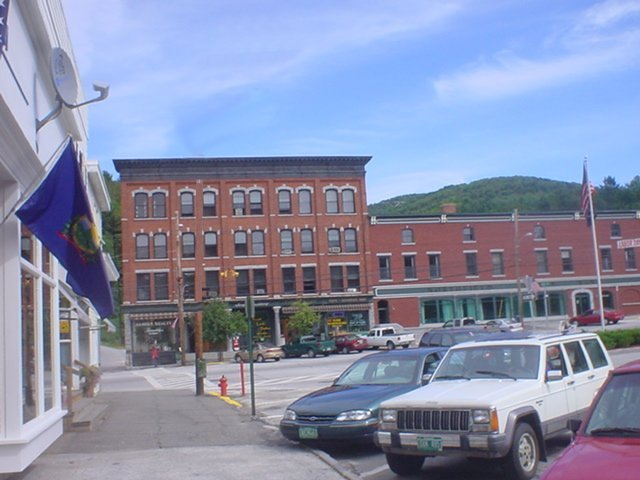
- Depot Square, Downtown Northfield

- Seal
- Motto: "Where the Good Life Begins"
- Location in Washington County and the state of Vermont
- Coordinates: 44°07′25″N 72°41′25″W
- Country: United States
- State: Vermont
- County: Washington
- Chartered: 1781
- Incorporated: 1855
- Communities: Northfield; Northfield Center; Northfield Falls; South Northfield

Area
  - Total: 43.6 sq mi (113.0 km^{2})
  - Land: 43.5 sq mi (112.7 km^{2})
  - Water: 0.12 sq mi (0.3 km^{2})
- Elevation: 1,385 ft (422 m)

Population (2020)
  - Total: 5,918
  - Density: 136.0/sq mi (52.51/km^{2})
- Time zone: UTC−5 (EST)
  - Summer (DST): UTC−4 (EDT)
- ZIP Codes: 05663 (Northfield); 05664 (Northfield Falls)
- Area code: 802
- FIPS code: 50-50275
- GNIS feature ID: 1462163
- Website: www.northfield-vt.gov

Northfield is a town in Washington County, Vermont, United States. The town lies in a valley within the Green Mountains and has been home to Norwich University since 1866. It contains the village of Northfield, where over half of the population lives. The town's total population was 5,918 at the 2020 census.

== History ==
Northfield was chartered in 1781. The community was named after Northfield, Massachusetts.

Northfield, was settled between 1785 and the 1820s by Yankees from Connecticut, Massachusetts, and older Vermont towns. The period saw the development of four distinct villages: South Village, Center Village, Factory Village, and Northfield Falls. South Village, with numerous small businesses, became the first to have a distinct identity. Center Village followed, where the first post office, town clerk’s office, and churches were established, coming to serve as Northfield's social and political center. Factory Village (now the village of Northfield), named for the woolen mill, developed next. Lastly, Northfield Falls thrived by the late 1820s.

Initially centered around farming and barter, Northfield's economic activities diversified. Potash production thrived until about 1814, after which Elijah Paine's woolen mill became a major employer. Wool prices declined in the 1840s, but Charles Paine, Elijah Paine's son and president of the Vermont Central Railroad constructed the railroad through town and established its headquarters in Northfield. Hundreds worked for the line. In 1852, the railroad changed ownership and gradually moved to St. Albans, causing the town's population to decline.

The arrival of the railroad in the 1840s transformed Factory Village into the local hub. Residents began to demand improved infrastructure and services, and petitioned the legislature to establish a separate Village of Northfield. This led to the incorporation of the Village of Northfield on November 14, 1855.

Slate quarrying provided a temporary economic boost in the 1860s and 1870s. Norwich University relocated to Northfield in 1866. In 1889, the first granite shed was built. More were constructed, and by the outbreak of World War I, over 525 people were employed in the granite sheds. Later, the granite industry faced challenges, leading to closures, and by 1954, only the Rock of Ages plant was left. The last plant, Cetrangolo Finishing Works, was closed in 1999.

== Geography ==
According to the United States Census Bureau, the town has a total area of 43.6 square miles (113.0 km^{2}), of which 43.5 square miles (112.7 km^{2}) is land and 0.12 square miles (0.3 km^{2}), or 0.29%, is water.

The geographic center of Vermont is located within the town, with markers on the university campus of the geographical and magnetic centers.

=== Climate ===
Northfield has a humid continental climate (Köppen Dfb).

Climate data for Northfield, Vermont (1991–2020 normals, extremes 1887–2018)
Month	Jan	Feb	Mar	Apr	May	Jun	Jul	Aug	Sep	Oct	Nov	Dec	Year
Record high °F (°C)	68 (20)	71 (22)	82 (28)	90 (32)	93 (34)	96 (36)	98 (37)	97 (36)	95 (35)	85 (29)	76 (24)	68 (20)	98 (37)
Mean daily maximum °F (°C)	28.7 (−1.8)	32.4 (0.2)	40.9 (4.9)	53.8 (12.1)	68.0 (20.0)	76.3 (24.6)	80.9 (27.2)	79.2 (26.2)	72.4 (22.4)	58.8 (14.9)	45.6 (7.6)	34.5 (1.4)	56.0 (13.3)
Daily mean °F (°C)	17.5 (−8.1)	19.9 (−6.7)	28.8 (−1.8)	41.5 (5.3)	54.3 (12.4)	63.4 (17.4)	68.0 (20.0)	66.1 (18.9)	58.9 (14.9)	46.7 (8.2)	35.8 (2.1)	24.5 (−4.2)	43.8 (6.6)
Mean daily minimum °F (°C)	6.3 (−14.3)	7.4 (−13.7)	16.7 (−8.5)	29.1 (−1.6)	40.7 (4.8)	50.6 (10.3)	55.0 (12.8)	53.1 (11.7)	45.5 (7.5)	34.7 (1.5)	25.9 (−3.4)	14.5 (−9.7)	31.6 (−0.2)
Record low °F (°C)	−35 (−37)	−39 (−39)	−23 (−31)	−1 (−18)	18 (−8)	27 (−3)	33 (1)	27 (−3)	16 (−9)	8 (−13)	−14 (−26)	−41 (−41)	−41 (−41)
Average precipitation inches (mm)	3.21 (82)	2.65 (67)	3.07 (78)	3.66 (93)	3.93 (100)	4.43 (113)	5.04 (128)	3.79 (96)	3.29 (84)	4.62 (117)	3.35 (85)	3.70 (94)	44.74 (1,136)
Average snowfall inches (cm)	17.9 (45)	15.0 (38)	13.9 (35)	3.3 (8.4)	0.0 (0.0)	0.0 (0.0)	0.0 (0.0)	0.0 (0.0)	0.0 (0.0)	0.3 (0.76)	4.1 (10)	21.3 (54)	75.8 (193)
Average precipitation days (≥ 0.01 in)	10.4	8.2	8.3	10.2	12.1	12.9	11.3	10.0	8.7	11.4	9.4	11.4	124.3
Average snowy days (≥ 0.1 in)	7.3	5.9	4.5	1.2	0.0	0.0	0.0	0.0	0.0	0.3	2.2	6.7	28.1
Source: NOAA

== Demographics ==
Historical population
Census	Pop.	Note	%±
1790	40		—
1800	204		410.0%
1810	426		108.8%
1820	690		62.0%
1830	1,412		104.6%
1840	2,013		42.6%
1850	2,922		45.2%
1860	4,329		48.2%
1870	3,410		−21.2%
1880	2,836		−16.8%
1890	2,628		−7.3%
1900	2,855		8.6%
1910	3,226		13.0%
1920	3,096		−4.0%
1930	3,438		11.0%
1940	3,601		4.7%
1950	4,314		19.8%
1960	4,511		4.6%
1970	4,870		8.0%
1980	5,435		11.6%
1990	5,610		3.2%
2000	5,791		3.2%
2010	6,207		7.2%
2020	5,918		−4.7%
U.S. Decennial Census

As of the census of 2000, there were 5,791 people, 1,819 households, and 1,224 families residing in the town. The population density was 132.5 people per square mile (51.2/km^{2}). There were 1,958 housing units at an average density of 44.8 per square mile (17.3/km^{2}). The racial makeup of the town was 95.41% White, 1.02% Black or African American, 0.36% Native American, 1.33% Asian, 0.43% from other races, and 1.45% from two or more races. Hispanic or Latino of any race were 2.21% of the population.

There were 1,819 households, out of which 32.4% had children under the age of 18 living with them, 53.5% were couples living together and joined in either marriage or civil union, 10.0% had a female householder with no husband present, and 32.7% were non-families. Of all households 24.3% were made up of individuals, and 9.7% had someone living alone who was 65 years of age or older. The average household size was 2.46 and the average family size was 2.95.

In the town, the population was spread out, with 19.4% under the age of 18, 27.2% from 18 to 24, 22.8% from 25 to 44, 18.9% from 45 to 64, and 11.6% who were 65 years of age or older. The median age was 30 years. For every 100 females, there were 122.0 males. For every 100 females age 18 and over, there were 122.5 males.

The median income for a household in the town was $41,523, and the median income for a family was $51,818. Males had a median income of $32,168 versus $24,781 for females. The per capita income for the town was $15,592. About 3.2% of families and 6.7% of the population were below the poverty line, including 6.4% of those under age 18 and 6.2% of those age 65 or over.

== Education ==
Norwich University is a senior military college that enrolls undergraduate students, and has a large online graduate program.

Northfield is part of Paine Mountain Union School District and has two schools: Northfield Elementary School and Northfield Middle/High School.

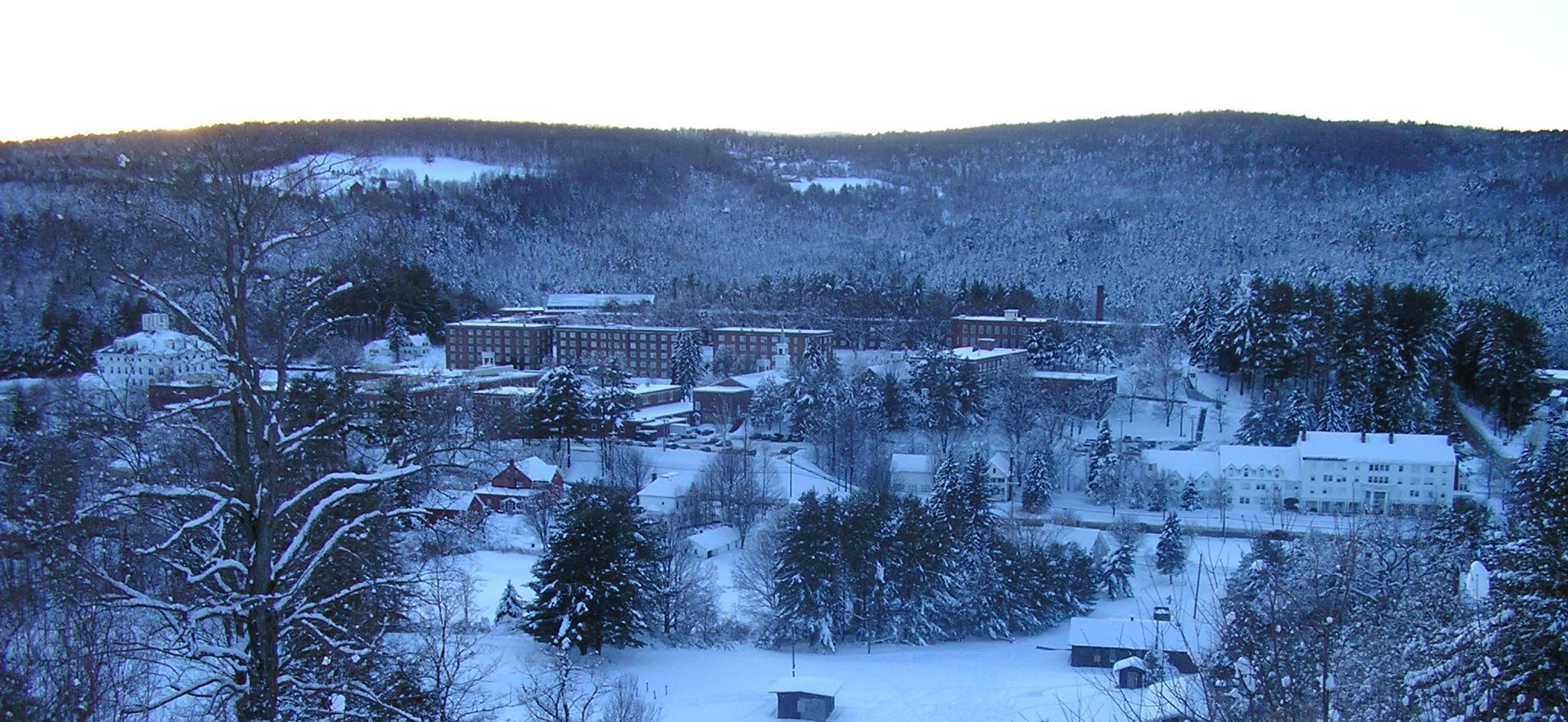
Winter at Norwich University, the town's main employer, located just south of downtown

== Landmarks ==
Northfield has five covered bridges. Three covered bridges—Upper Cox, Lower Cox, and Northfield Falls—cross Cox Brook and Dog River within a quarter mile of each other on Cox Brook Road. Just below those bridges, the Slaughterhouse Covered Bridge crosses the Dog River. The Stony Brook Covered Bridge, constructed in 1899, is the last kingpost truss covered bridge built on a Vermont public highway.

== Media ==
Published locally is the Northfield News & Transcript. It is a weekly newspaper and was established in 1878 by George Richmond.

== Economy ==
The town's largest employer is Norwich University, followed by Cabot Hosiery Mills.

== Infrastructure ==
=== Transportation ===
Bus

Northfield is served by Green Mountain Transit Agency's commuter route 93 between Montpelier and Northfield.

==== Roads ====
- Vermont Route 12 – Northfield to Montpelier. Northfield to Brookfield.
- Vermont Route 64 – Northfield to Williamstown.

== Notable people ==
- Ida A. T. Arms, missionary, educator, and temperance leader
- Henry M. Bates, Vermont State Treasurer
- Murdock A. Campbell, United States Army Major General and Adjutant General, Vermont National Guard
- John P. Connarn, Vermont House of Representatives, Vermont Attorney General, and Judge
- Beatrice Corliss, first woman mayor of Gloucester, Massachusetts and member of the Massachusetts House of Representatives
- Reginald M. Cram, United States Air Force Major General and Adjutant General of the Vermont National Guard
- Joseph H. Denny, Speaker of the Vermont House of Representatives and President pro tempore of the Vermont State Senate
- Alonzo Jackman, Norwich University professor and Brigadier General of the Vermont Militia in the American Civil War
- Hollis Latham, Wisconsin state legislator and farmer (born in Northfield)
- William B. Mayo, Medical doctor and politician
- George Nichols, Secretary of State of Vermont and president of Norwich University
- Charles Paine, president of the Vermont Central Railroad and 15th governor of Vermont
- Charles Plumley, congressman from Vermont
- Frank Plumley, congressman from Vermont
- Francis V. Randall, Union Army officer during the American Civil War
- Susanne R. Young, Vermont Attorney General beginning in June 2022

== See also ==
- Central Vermont Railway
- Central Vermont Railway Depot (Northfield, Vermont)
- Northfield Savings Bank
